= Sunwise (album) =

2025 studio album by Brìghde Chaimbeul

Studio album by Brìghde Chaimbeul
- Released: 27 June 2025
- Studios: Analogue Catalogue, Newry, Northern Ireland
- Length: 30:50
- Labels: tak:til, Glitterbeat
- Producer: Brìghde Chaimbeul

Solo studio album chronology
Carry Them with Us (2023)	Sunwise (2025)

Sunwise is the third solo studio album by the Scottish piper Brìghde Chaimbeul, released on 27 June 2025 by tak:til/Glitterbeat. Chaimbeul plays the Scottish smallpipes and also sings on the record. Three of its eight tracks are her own compositions and the remaining five are traditional pieces she arranged. The saxophonist Colin Stetson appears on one track.

The album is organised around winter; Chaimbeul has described it as following "the embrace of winter time; the closing in of darkness, the cold, the pull to turn inward". It was well received by critics. Sunwise reached number one on the World Music Charts Europe monthly chart for August 2025, placed third in the Best Album category of the 2025 Songlines Music Awards, and was shortlisted for the 2026 SAY Award.

== Background and recording ==
KLOF Mag described Sunwise as "very much a Brìghde Chaimbeul solo record", in contrast to its more collaborative predecessor, Carry Them With Us (2023), on which Stetson had a larger role. Writing in Songlines, Tim Cumming reported that the album was recorded at Analogue Catalogue studio in Newry, Northern Ireland, using tape-based analogue methods, and that Chaimbeul conceived it around the Cailleach Bheur, the hag figure of Scottish winter folklore.

The album's liner notes credit the recording to Julie McLarnon at Analogue Catalogue Studios together with Andrea Gobbi and Rocky O'Reilly; O'Reilly mixed and mastered the record, and Chaimbeul produced it herself.

Chaimbeul has said the record draws on "customs of the season, and gathering for the ceilidh: songs and stories told round the fire". Cumming wrote that the sequence moves from the first long nights of winter through to early spring.

== Composition ==
The album comprises eight tracks and runs for just under 31 minutes. Chaimbeul composed "Dùsgadh / Waking", "A Chailleach" and "Duanen the Door", and "A Chailleach" incorporates a traditional waulking song. The album's Bandcamp release page states that the remaining five are traditional pieces arranged by Chaimbeul and "taken from a variety of sources, but primarily field recordings from the School of Scottish Studies in Edinburgh".

Stetson plays saxophone on "A Chailleach". Chaimbeul told Songlines that on the track "the sound he makes melts into the pipes". "Sguabag / The Sweeper" was recorded live with three uilleann pipers, whom KLOF Mag names as John McSherry, Francis McIlduff and Jamie Murphy. On "Duanen the Door", Chaimbeul's father, the Gaelic writer Aonghas Phàdraig Caimbeul, recites the Hogmanay rhyme "Rann na Callaig" (so identified in the liner notes) and Seamus Heath plays organ. Her brother Eòsaph Caimbeul sings in canntaireachd style on the closing track.

== Release ==
Sunwise was released on 27 June 2025 digitally, on compact disc and on vinyl.

== Critical reception ==
Professional ratings
Review scores
Source	Rating
theartsdesk	4/5 stars
PopMatters	8/10

Reviewing Sunwise as Bandcamp Daily's Album of the Day, Michal Wieczorek wrote that Chaimbeul's playing was "sparser, even dronier, but at the same time just as steeped in tradition, leaning to mystery and mysticism". For theartsdesk, Kieron Tyler rated it four stars out of five and called it "the product of a deft creativity: a distinctive vision which marks out Brìghde Chaimbeul as a singular sonic auteur". He heard the record not as "minimalist folk" but as "folk music drawing from, and incorporating, minimalism". Geeta Dayal, in 4Columns, found the album "transporting in a way that few are", and said Chaimbeul "works within tradition to extend it". Adriane Pontecorvo of PopMatters scored it 8 out of 10, writing that Chaimbeul's "approach to the bagpipes [is] as deeply rooted as it is innovative".

Ian Mathers of Dusted found "a powerfully ceremonial feeling to this set of songs", and Gary Whitehouse of A Green Man Review called it "an innovative melding of traditional song and tune with modern technique and sensibility".

Rob Adams, writing in The List, judged the album "good (even great) in parts, just not as devastatingly alluring as the live experience", while singling out "the rough-hewn, characterful 'Sguabag/The Sweeper', where she's joined by three other pipers", as having "something of the carousing spirit of The Bothy Band in their early iteration".

== Accolades ==
Sunwise reached number one on the World Music Charts Europe monthly chart for August 2025, having stood at number five the previous month. It placed second on the same organisation's aggregated chart for the whole of 2025. The album finished third in the Best Album category of the 2025 Songlines Music Awards, and appeared on the Trad Album longlist for the 2025 Scots Trad Music Awards. In October 2026 it was named one of the ten albums on the shortlist for the 2026 SAY Award.

== Track listing ==
Track titles follow the album's packaging. The digital release titles the second, third and seventh tracks "A' Chailleach", "kindle the fire" and "Duan" respectively. Traditional tracks are arranged by Brìghde Chaimbeul.

Sunwise
No.	Title	Writer(s)	Length
1.	"Dùsgadh / Waking"	Brìghde Chaimbeul	9:21
2.	"A Chailleach"	Brìghde Chaimbeul	7:31
3.	"interlude – kindle the fire"	Traditional	0:39
4.	"She Went Astray"	Traditional	1:41
5.	"Bog an Lochan"	Traditional	2:23
6.	"Sguabag / The Sweeper"	Traditional	4:20
7.	"Duanen the Door"	Brìghde Chaimbeul	3:56
8.	"The Rain Is Wine and the Stones Are Cheese"	Traditional	0:59
Total length:			30:50

== Personnel ==
Credits adapted from the album's liner notes, its Bandcamp release page and KLOF Mag.

Musicians

- Brìghde Chaimbeul – Scottish smallpipes, voice
- Colin Stetson – saxophones (track 2)
- John McSherry – uilleann pipes (track 6)
- Francis McIlduff – uilleann pipes (track 6)
- Jamie Murphy – uilleann pipes (track 6)
- Seamus Heath – organ (track 7)
- Aonghas Phàdraig Caimbeul – "Rann na Callaig" (track 7)
- Eòsaph Caimbeul – vocals (track 8)

Technical

- Brìghde Chaimbeul – producer
- Julie McLarnon – recording
- Andrea Gobbi – recording
- Rocky O'Reilly – recording, mixing, mastering

Artwork

- John Smith – design
- Craig Gallacher – design
- Beth Chalmers – photography
- Jonny Ashworth – hand photograph
- Liondsaidh Chaimbeul – "Bog an Lochan" artwork
