= Border Fiddles =

Border Fiddles perform traditional and contemporary music from their native Scottish Borders. Formerly known as Borders Young Fiddles. They released an album on ISLE Music Scotland in 2004 and have performed across the UK and Ireland.

== Line ups ==
1999 to 2005 (Borders Young Fiddles)
Lori Watson – Fiddle
Shona Mooney – Fiddle
Innes Watson – Fiddle
Rachel Cross – Fiddle
Allan Hyslop – Fiddle
Sandy Watson – Guitar and Bouzouki

2005 to current day (Borders Young Fiddles until 2006, now Border Fiddles)
Lori Watson – Fiddle
Shona Mooney – Fiddle
Innes Watson – Fiddle
Rachel Cross – Fiddle
Carly Blain – Fiddle
Sandy Watson – Guitar and Bouzouki

== Discography ==
- Borders Young Fiddles by Borders Young Fiddles, ISLE Music Scotland, 2004.
