= BBC Radio Scotland Young Traditional Musician =

Award for Scottish traditional music

- Awarded for: Scottish folk music
- Sponsored by: BBC Radio Scotland
- Venue: Glasgow City Halls
- Country: Scotland
- Presented by: Hands Up for Trad
- Hosted by: Bruce MacGregor; Joy Dunlop
- First award: 2001
- Final award: 2026
- Currently held by: Rachel Groves
- Website: projects.handsupfortrad.scot/youngtrad/

Television/radio coverage
- Network: BBC Radio Scotland; BBC Alba

The BBC Radio Scotland Young Traditional Musician competition has run annually since 2001. It exists to encourage young musicians to keep their tradition alive and to provide performance opportunities, tools and advice to help contestants make a career in traditional music. Former winners include Hannah Rarity, Mohsen Amini, Robyn Stapleton, Shona Mooney and Emily Smith.

== Competition ==
The competition was started in 2000 by Simon Thoumire, together with fiddler Clare McLaughlin and Elspeth Cowie, national organiser of the Traditional Music and Song Association of Scotland (TMSA), and was first awarded at the 2001 Celtic Connections festival. BBC Radio Scotland started to support the award the following year, and has continued to do so. The award is organised and run by Hands Up for Trad on behalf of BBC Radio Scotland.

The usual format of the award is a residential weekend in October at Wiston Lodge, South Lanarkshire for twelve semi-finalists. From there, six are selected to go on to a final concert, where the winner is chosen by a panel of judges.

Since 2007, the final concert has been held in Glasgow City Halls on the last day of the Celtic Connections festival, and broadcast live on BBC Radio Scotland. Between 2012 and 2015 the final concert was also televised on BBC Alba. The presenter was initially Mary Ann Kennedy, replaced in 2016 by Bruce MacGregor. From 2020 the final concert was again televised on BBC Alba with Joy Dunlop giving Gaelic commentary alongside MacGregor.

The semi-finals of the 2021 competition took place in October 2020 during the COVID-19 pandemic. Instead of the Wiston Lodge weekend, the entrants performed in the foyer of the BBC Pacific Quay building, with no audience.

The eligibility criteria are that the contestant is aged between 16 and 27, and is normally resident in Scotland or has lived in Scotland for five years. This age range is more extended than the similarly titled BBC Radio 2 Young Folk Award. That award is open to all United Kingdom residents, but its age range is just 16 to 21. Hence the contestants for the Scottish award are usually more advanced musicians, often students or graduates of one of the degrees in traditional music such as the Royal Conservatoire of Scotland's BMus with Honours (Traditional music), and already established in a professional career in music.

While the BBC Radio 2 Young Folk Award uses the umbrella term "folk", the BBC Radio Scotland Young Traditional Musician award is specifically for a Scottish musician performing the music of their own tradition, though not necessarily Scottish traditional music.

The TMSA Young Trad Tour is an annual tour of Scotland by the finalists and the previous year's winner, organised by the Traditional Music and Song Association of Scotland, and supported by Creative Scotland. The destinations include the Celtic Connections festival and the hometowns of each of the finalists. The musicians also make an album together.

== Award winners and nominees ==
Winners are listed first and marked with a blue riband.

Year	Blue ribbon	Name	Homeplace	Instrument	Higher music education
2026	Blue ribbon	Rachel Groves	Aberdeenshire	Lever Harp	University of Edinburgh, Berklee College of Music (Valencia)
2026		Calum McGregor	Glasgow	Piano, accordion	
2026		Craig Harrison	County Clare	Fiddle	
2026		Iona Fyfe	Aberdeenshire	Voice	Royal Conservatoire of Scotland
2026		Ewen Rorie	Orkney	Fiddle	
2026		Gregor Niven	Glasgow	Accordion	UHI North, West and Hebrides
2025	Blue ribbon	Ellie Beaton	Rothienorman	Voice	Royal Conservatoire of Scotland
2025		Roo Geddes	Glasgow	Fiddle	Royal Conservatoire of Scotland
2025		Miguel Girão	Portugal	Guitar	Escola Superior de Música de Lisboa and Royal Conservatoire of Scotland
2025		Laura Penman	Edinburgh	Clarsach	Royal Conservatoire of Scotland
2025		Noah Scott	France	Piano	Royal Conservatoire of Scotland
2025		Clelland Shand	Dunfermline	Accordion	Royal Conservatoire of Scotland
2024	Blue ribbon	Calum McIlroy	Aberdeenshire	Guitar, mandolin & voice	Royal Conservatoire of Scotland
2024		John Dew	Perthshire	Bagpipes	Royal Conservatoire of Scotland
2024		Ruairidh Iain Gray	South Uist	Voice	Royal Conservatoire of Scotland
2024		Ella Munro	Skye	Voice	Royal Conservatoire of Scotland
2024		Matt Tighe	London	Fiddle	Trinity Laban Conservatoire of Music and Dance
2024		Evie Waddell	Stirling	Voice, step dance percussion	Royal Conservatoire of Scotland
2023	Blue ribbon	Amy Laurenson	Shetland	piano	Royal Conservatoire of Scotland
2023		Sam Mabbett	Oxfordshire	accordion	Royal Conservatoire of Scotland
2023		Mairi McGillivray	Islay	Gaelic song	Royal Conservatoire of Scotland
2023		Aidan Moodie	Orkney	voice, guitar	Royal Conservatoire of Scotland
2023		Madeleine Stewart	New England, USA	fiddle	Royal Conservatoire of Scotland
2023		Ailis Sutherland	Kirriemuir, Angus	smallpipes	University of the Highlands and Islands
2022	Blue ribbon	Eryn Rae	Scottish Borders	fiddle	Royal Conservatoire of Scotland
2022		Breanna Wilson	Glasgow	fiddle	Royal Conservatoire of Scotland
2022		Malachy Arnold	Glasgow	clarsach	Royal Conservatoire of Scotland
2022		Saffron Hanvidge	Inverness	Gaelic song	Sabhal Mòr Ostaig
2022		Malin Lewis	Skye	pipes	Royal Conservatoire of Scotland
2022		Sophie Joint	Glasgow	piano	Royal Conservatoire of Scotland
2021	Blue ribbon	Michael Biggins	Newcastle upon Tyne	piano	Royal Conservatoire of Scotland
2021		Lucie Hendry	Aberdeenshire	lever harp	Royal Conservatoire of Scotland
2021		Iona Fyfe	Huntly	voice	Royal Conservatoire of Scotland
2021		Graham Rorie	Orkney	fiddle	Royal Conservatoire of Scotland
2021		Ellie Beaton	Rothienorman	voice	Aberdeen City Music School
2021		Bradley Parker	County Down	bagpipes	Royal Conservatoire of Scotland
2020	Blue ribbon	Ali Levack	Dingwall	whistles, pipes	Royal Conservatoire of Scotland
2020		Calum McIlroy	Aberdeenshire	guitar, mandolin, voice	Royal Conservatoire of Scotland
2020		Mhairi Mackinnon	Perthshire	fiddle	Royal Conservatoire of Scotland
2020		Cameron Nixon	Aberdeenshire	Scots song	Royal Conservatoire of Scotland
2020		Josie Duncan	Lewis	Gaelic song	Royal Conservatoire of Scotland
2020		Padruig Morrison	Uist	accordion	Edinburgh University and Maynooth University
2019	Blue ribbon	Benedict Morris	Glasgow	fiddle	Royal Conservatoire of Scotland
2019		Luc McNally	Dipton, County Durham	guitar, voice	Royal Conservatoire of Scotland
2019		Cameron Ross	Stonehaven	fiddle	Royal Conservatoire of Scotland
2019		Ross Miller	Linlithgow	bagpipes	Royal Conservatoire of Scotland
2019		Catherine Tinney	Skye	Gaelic song	
2019		Sarah Markey	Coatbridge	flute	
2018	Blue ribbon	Hannah Rarity	West Lothian	Scots song	Royal Conservatoire of Scotland
2018		David Shedden	Glasgow	bagpipes	Royal Conservatoire of Scotland
2018		Amy Papiransky	Keith, Moray	Scots song	University of Aberdeen and Royal Conservatoire of Scotland
2018		Rory Matheson	Drumbeg, Sutherland	piano	Royal Conservatoire of Scotland
2018		Ali Levack	Maryburgh, Ross-shire	whistles, pipes	Royal Conservatoire of Scotland
2018		Luc McNally (Note: Unable to perform due to injury.)	Dipton, County Durham	guitar, voice	Royal Conservatoire of Scotland
2017	Blue ribbon	Charlie Stewart	Glenfarg	fiddle	Royal Conservatoire of Scotland
2017		Grant McFarlane	Paisley	accordion	Royal Conservatoire of Scotland
2017		Iona Fyfe	Huntly	Scots song	Royal Conservatoire of Scotland
2017		Dougie McCance	Erskine	bagpipes	University of the Highlands and Islands
2017		Ella Munro	Skye	Scots song	Royal Conservatoire of Scotland
2017		Kim Carnie	Oban	Gaelic song	
2016	Blue ribbon	Mohsen Amini	Glasgow	concertina	
2016		Hannah Macrae	Lochaber	fiddle	Royal Conservatoire of Scotland
2016		Jessica Burton	Orkney	clarsach	Royal Conservatoire of Scotland
2016		Murray Willis	Lismore	accordion	Benbecula College
2016		Robbie Greig	Edinburgh	fiddle	Benbecula College
2016		Ryan Young	Cardross	fiddle	Royal Conservatoire of Scotland
2015	Blue ribbon	Claire Hastings	Dumfries	song	Royal Conservatoire of Scotland
2015		Ainsley Hamill	Cardross	song	Royal Conservatoire of Scotland
2015		Gemma Donald	Shetland	fiddle	
2015		Heather Downie	Dunblane	clarsach	
2015		Ryan Young	Cardross	fiddle	Royal Conservatoire of Scotland
2015		Séamus Ó Baoighill	Skye	fiddle	
2014	Blue ribbon	Robyn Stapleton	Stranraer	voice	Royal Conservatoire of Scotland
2014		Alistair Iain Paterson	Bishopton	piano	Royal Conservatoire of Scotland
2014		Ian Smith	Tiree	accordion	Royal Conservatoire of Scotland
2014		Jack Badcock	Edinburgh	guitar, song	
2014		Mhairi Marwick	Fochabers	fiddle	Strathclyde University
2014		Neil Ewart	Kilchoan	fiddle	Strathclyde University
2013	Blue ribbon	Paddy Callaghan	Glasgow	accordion	
2013		Andrew Dunlop	Connel	piano	Royal Northern College of Music and Eastman School of Music
2013		Graham Mackenzie	Inverness	fiddle	Royal Northern College of Music
2013		Grant MacFarlane	Paisley	accordion	Royal Conservatoire of Scotland
2013		Hannah Fisher	Dunkeld	fiddle	
2013		Scott Wood	Erskine	pipes, whistle	Royal Conservatoire of Scotland
2012	Blue ribbon	Rona Wilkie	Oban	fiddle	
2012		Kirsty Watt	Lewis	Gaelic song	
2012		Katie Boyle	Glasgow	fiddle	Irish World Academy of Music and Dance
2012		Catriona Price	Orkney	fiddle	Royal Northern College of Music and Royal Academy of Music
2012		Roisin Anne Hughes	Glasgow	fiddle	
2012		Alistair Ogilvy	Strathblane	Scots song	
2011	Blue ribbon	Kristan Harvey	Orkney	fiddle	Royal Conservatoire of Scotland
2011		Alistair Ogilvy	Strathblane	song	
2011		Andrew Waite	Duns	accordion	
2011		Lorne MacDougall	Carradale	pipes	Royal Scottish Academy of Music and Drama
2011		Mairi Chaimbeul	Skye	Gaelic song and clarsach	Berklee College of Music
2011		Tina Rees	Glasgow	piano	
2010	Blue ribbon	Daniel Thorpe	Inverurie	fiddle	Royal Conservatoire of Scotland
2010		Paddy Callaghan	Glasgow	accordion, harp	
2010		Mairi Chaimbeul	Skye	harp	Berklee College of Music
2010		Lorne MacDougall	Carradale	pipes	Royal Scottish Academy of Music and Drama
2010		Hannah Phillips	Glasgow	harp	Royal Conservatoire of Scotland
2010		Kyle Warren	Helensburgh	pipes	Royal Conservatoire of Scotland
2009	Blue ribbon	Ruairidh MacMillan	Nairn	fiddle	Royal Scottish Academy of Music and Drama
2009		Adam Holmes	Edinburgh	guitar	
2009		Lorne MacDougall	Carradale	pipes, whistle	Royal Scottish Academy of Music and Drama
2009		Kenneth Nicolson	Lewis	Gaelic song	
2009		Jack Smedley	Buckie	fiddle	
2009		Daniel Thorpe	Inverurie	fiddle	Royal Conservatoire of Scotland
2008	Blue ribbon	Ewan Robertson	Carrbridge	guitar, voice	
2008		Steven Blake	Livingstone	pipes, whistle	Royal Conservatoire of Scotland
2008		Amy Lord	Dunblane	Scots song	Royal Conservatoire of Scotland
2008		James Duncan MacKenzie	Isle of Lewis	pipes, smallpipes, flute, whistles	
2008		Robert Menzies	Dumfries	accordion, piano	
2008		Ailie Robertson	Edinburgh	clarsach	
2007	Blue ribbon	Catriona Watt	Lewis	Gaelic	Royal Scottish Academy of Music and Drama
2007		Darren MacLean	Isle of Skye	Gaelic song	Royal Scottish Academy of Music and Drama
2007		Mike Vass	Nairn	fiddle	
2007		Calum Stewart	Garmouth	wooden flute	
2007		Calum MacCrimmon	Monifieth	pipes, whistles	
2007		Martin Hunter	Glasgow	accordion	
2006	Blue ribbon	Shona Mooney	Borders	fiddle	Newcastle University
2006		Kirsty Cotter	Glasgow	fiddle	
2006		Christopher Keatinge	Melrose	accordion	
2006		Darren MacLean	Skye	Gaelic song	Royal Scottish Academy of Music and Drama
2006		Hamish Napier	Grantown on Spey	flute, piano, Scots song	Berklee College of Music
2006		Fraser Shaw	Islay	pipes, whistle	Sabhal Mòr Ostaig
2005	Blue ribbon	Stuart Cassells	Falkirk	bagpipes	Royal Scottish Academy of Music and Drama
2005		Rachel Newton	Edinburgh	clarsarch, song	
2005		Mike Vass	Nairn	fiddle	
2005		Darren Maclean	Skye	song	Royal Scottish Academy of Music and Drama
2005		Sarah Naylor	Skye	fiddle	Strathclyde University
2005		Maeve Mackinnon	Glasgow	song	Royal Scottish Academy of Music and Drama and Sabhal Mòr Ostaig
2004	Blue ribbon	James Graham	Lochinver	Gaelic song	Royal Scottish Academy of Music and Drama
2004		Shona Donaldson	Huntly	voice, fiddle	
2004		Rosie Morton	Edinburgh	clarsach, voice	Royal Scottish Academy of Music and Drama
2004		Sarah Naylor	Skye	fiddle, voice	Strathclyde University
2004		Tom Orr	Lanark	accordion	
2004		Jenna Reid	Shetland	fiddle, piano, voice	Royal Scottish Academy of Music and Drama
2003	Blue ribbon	Anna Massie	Fortrose	fiddle, guitar	Strathclyde University
2003		Shona Donaldson	Huntly	song	
2003		Sarah-Jane Fifield	Inverness	fiddle	
2003		Mark Laurenson	Shetland	fiddle	
2003		Kevin O'Neill	Glasgow	flute	
2003		Lori Watson	Borders	fiddle, voice	Royal Scottish Academy of Music and Drama
2002	Blue ribbon	Emily Smith	Dumfries and Galloway	Scots song	Royal Scottish Academy of Music and Drama
2002		Ruaridh Campbell	Aberfoyle	fiddle	Strathclyde University
2002		Jennifer Port	Golspie	harp	Royal Scottish Academy of Music and Drama
2002		Findlay Napier	Grantown on Spey	voice, guitar	Royal Scottish Academy of Music and Drama
2002		Lori Watson	Borders	fiddle	Royal Scottish Academy of Music and Drama
2002		Ross Ainslie	Bridge of Earn	smallpipes, whistle, Highland pipes	
2001	Blue ribbon	Gillian Frame	Arran	fiddle	Royal Conservatoire of Scotland
2001		Patsy Reid	Perthshire	fiddle	Royal Northern College of Music
2001		Kevin O'Neill	Glasgow	flute	
2001		Mairearad Green	Achiltibuie	pipes, accordion	
2001		Steve Byrne	Arbroath	Scots song	
2001		Celine Donoghue	Glasgow	banjo	Royal Scottish Academy of Music and Drama

== See also ==
- Celtic Connections
- Music of Scotland
- Scottish folk music
