= Celtic Woman 4 =

Compilation album by various artists
- Released: 2 February 2010
- Genre: Celtic, new-age, folk
- Language: English, Irish, Scots Gaelic
- Label: Valley Entertainment
- Producer: Jon Birgé

Celtic Woman 4 is the fourth release in a compilation series from Valley Entertainment that began in 1998. The album brings together songs, both original and traditional, from albums released in the British Isles. It was released in the United States. It features a range of female artists including Karen Matheson of Capercaillie, Julie Fowlis, Kate Rusby, and Back of the Moon.

== Track listing ==
No.	Title	Performer(s)	Length
1.	"The Final Trawl"	Back of the Moon	4:43
2.	"Gregor"	Eilidh Shaw	3:59
3.	"Tha Caolas Eadar Mi 's Iain"	Julie Fowlis	4:48
4.	"Fair Helen of Kirkconnel"	Emily Smith	3:20
5.	"Ailein Duinn"	Catriona Watt	3:09
6.	"Mi Le M'uilinn"	Karen Matheson	5:29
7.	"Galway Bay"	Dolores Keane	3:34
8.	"Domhnall O Conaill"	Deirbhile Ni Bhrolchain	4:24
9.	"Mo Ghruagach Dhonn"	Julie Fowlis	3:57
10.	"Fiollaigean"	Maeve Mackinnon	4:01
11.	"Blooming Heather"	Kate Rusby	4:47
