= Carry Them with Us =

2023 studio album by Brìghde Chaimbeul

Studio album by Brìghde Chaimbeul
- Released: 14 April 2023
- Studio: Analogue Catalogue
- Length: 35:23
- Labels: tak:til, Glitterbeat
- Producers: Brìghde Chaimbeul; Colin Stetson

Solo studio album chronology
The Reeling (2019)	Carry Them with Us (2023)	Sunwise (2025)

Carry Them With Us is the second solo studio album by the Scottish piper Brìghde Chaimbeul, released on 14 April 2023 by tak:til/Glitterbeat. Chaimbeul plays the Scottish smallpipes and harmonium and sings on the record, which she produced with the saxophonist Colin Stetson, the album's featured collaborator.

The album was well received. It was shortlisted for the 2023 Scottish Album of the Year Award, and appeared on year-end lists at The Guardian, The Quietus and musicOMH.

== Background and recording ==
The album followed Chaimbeul's debut, The Reeling (2019), and Las (2022), a trio album made with Ross Ainslie and Steven Byrnes. It was recorded by Julie McLarnon at Analogue Catalogue Studios, mixed by Stetson and mastered by Gregor Zemljič. Chaimbeul and Stetson are credited jointly as producers, and Stetson also plays saxophone.

Tom Bolton, in The Quietus, wrote that the album's title is "a quotation from Gaelic bard Iain Sheonaidh, of South Uist, who carried the old tales with him".

== Composition ==
The album comprises nine tracks and runs for about 35 minutes. Bolton wrote that the album "is mostly instrumental, but its tracks tell stories", and identified "Tha Fonn Gun Bhi Trom" as a traditional waulking song, "sung by Scots women as they beat cloth". He wrote that "Pilliù (The Call of The Redshank)" and "Pìobaireachd Nan Eun" were "inspired by the singing of birds", and recounted the reel "Banish The Giant of Doubt & Despair" as "the tale of the princess of an underwater kingdom and the giant of the Western Isles who cannot stop dancing to her song, faster and faster until he falls into the sea and drowns". "Uguviu (ii)", according to the same review, is partly improvised, the pipes and saxophone "exchanging repeating, minimal phrases".

In The Guardian, Jude Rogers wrote that the album's "arresting, hypnotic compositions explore folkloric tropes like the dark recesses of the childlike imagination and communication with birds".

== Release ==
Carry Them With Us was released on 14 April 2023 digitally, on compact disc and on vinyl.

== Critical reception ==
Professional ratings
Review scores
Source	Rating
musicOMH	4/5 stars
NARC. Magazine	4.5/5 stars

Reviewing the album for The Quietus, Bolton found that "despite the unconventional pairing of instruments, they often seem to make a single sound", and credited Chaimbeul with "transforming them into some of the most satisfying and complete music to be found anywhere in these islands". Steven Johnson gave it four stars out of five in musicOMH, praising the album's atmosphere and calling Chaimbeul's playing "both plaintive and stark"; he concluded that the record "helps shine light on a lesser seen musical world".

For Dusted Magazine, Ian Mathers described Chaimbeul and Stetson as "kindred spirits" whose "completely natural fit here might take you aback", and the album as "intensely striking". Lee Fisher, rating it 4.5 out of 5 in NARC. Magazine, wrote that "these largely traditional tunes are turned into whirling, disorienting, almost ritualistic pieces driven by the small pipes' drones and melodies", and that "it's hard to tell where Chaimbeul's pipes and Stetson's sax meet".

Thomas Blake of KLOF Mag described "a series of strange, beautiful dream-stories, told with flair, nuance and incredible technical proficiency".

== Accolades ==
Carry Them With Us was among the twenty albums longlisted for the 2023 Scottish Album of the Year Award in September 2023, and was one of the ten shortlisted the following month.

Rogers placed the album seventh in The Guardian's "The 10 best folk albums of 2023", writing that it "sees her smallpipes blending bitingly but beautifully with" Stetson's "less muscular than usual but nonetheless magical playing", and that "with dissonance often stuttering next to moments of deep beauty, this feels like an album both of its time and out of time". The Quietus ranked it thirteenth in its albums of 2023, and it was listed eighth in musicOMH's Top 50 Albums of 2023.

== Track listing ==
Track listing and durations from the album's Bandcamp release page.

Carry Them With Us
No.	Title	Length
1.	"Pilliù (The Call of The Redshank)"	3:54
2.	"Tha Fonn Gun Bhi Trom (I Am Disposed of Mirth)"	5:35
3.	"Banish The Giant of Doubt & Despair"	3:22
4.	"Crònan (i)"	4:36
5.	"Uguviu (ii)"	2:50
6.	"Pìobaireachd Nan Eun"	3:32
7.	"Òran an Eich-Uisge (Song of the Waterhorse)"	2:24
8.	"'S Mi Gabhail an Rathaid (I Take The Road)"	5:14
9.	"Bonn Beinn Eadarra (The Haunting)"	3:56
Total length:		35:23

== Personnel ==
Credits adapted from the Mainly Norfolk discography.

- Brìghde Chaimbeul – Scottish smallpipes, harmonium, voice; production
- Colin Stetson – saxophone; production, mixing
- Jamie Murphy – uilleann pipes
- Julie McLarnon – recording
- Gregor Zemljič – mastering
- Liondsaidh Chaimbeul – artwork
- Linda Söderholm – design
- Camille Lemoine – photography
