= Ailein Duinn =

Scottish Gaelic song

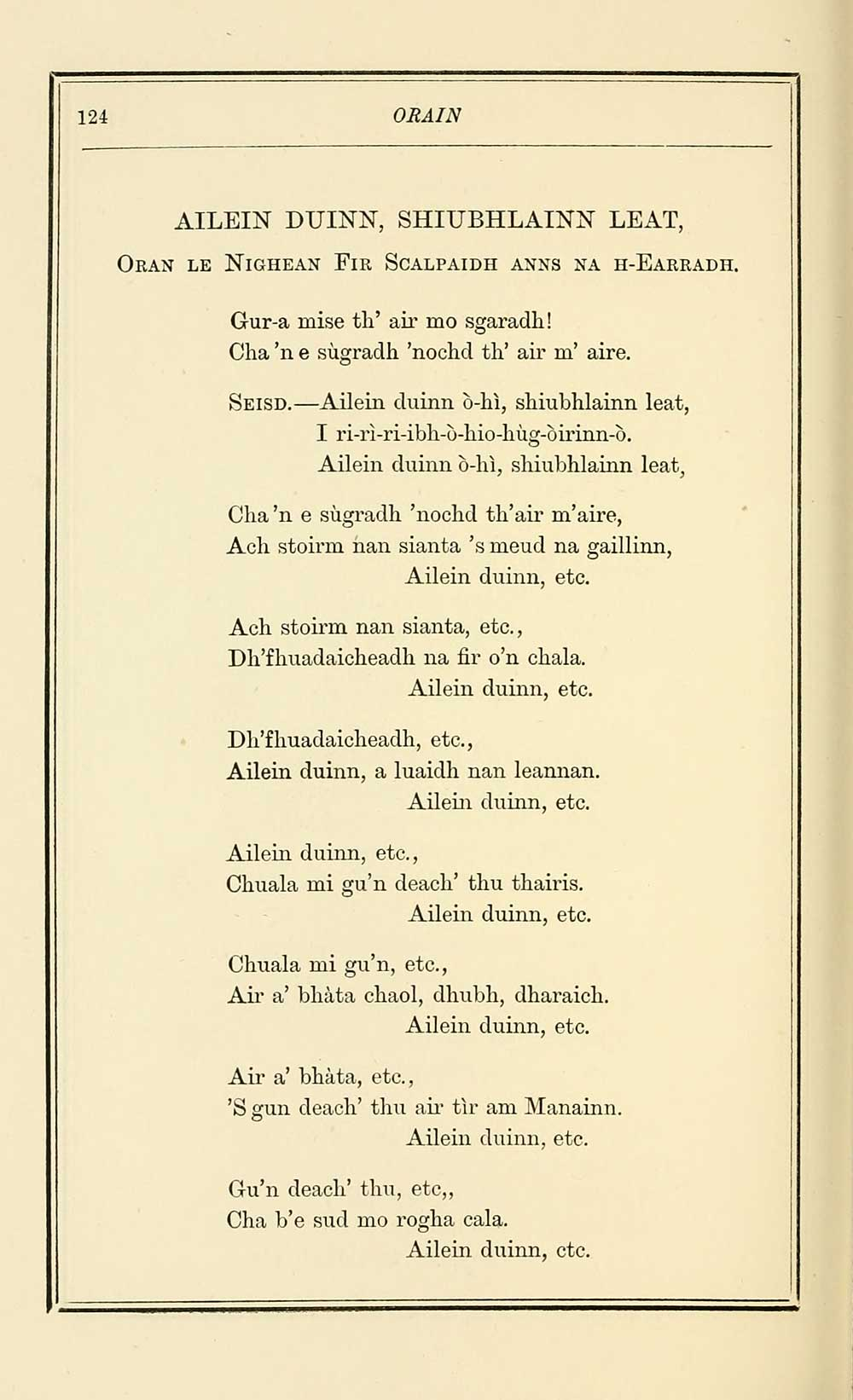
Lyrics from the 1879 book The Gaelic Songster.

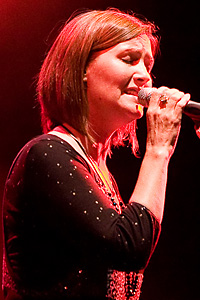
Karen Matheson of the band Capercaillie who sang Ailein duinn in the 1995 film Rob Roy

"Ailein Duinn" (English: "Dark-haired Alan" or "Brown-haired Alan"), sometimes titled as "Ailein Duinn, ò hì Shiubhlainn Leat" or "Ailein Duinn, Shiubhlainn Leat", is a traditional Scottish Gaelic song often arranged for a solo female voice. It is believed to have been written by Annie Campbell (Scottish Gaelic: Annag Chaimbeul) towards the end of the 18th century.

The song has sometimes been sung as a waulking song. Versions are recorded to have been sung throughout the length of the Outer Hebrides with, as of January 2026, 20 copies recorded in the Tobar an Dualchais – Kist o Riches archive. It has been sung at the National Mòd and recorded by a variety of commercial artists. It featured on the soundtrack of the 1995 film Rob Roy and samples from that recording were used in the theme for the 2006 video game Tomb Raider: Legend.

== Composition ==
The song is a lament written following the death of Campbell's fiancée in 1788. (Note: Tobar an Dualchais – Kist o Riches sometimes dates the incident to 1786.) Alan Morrison (Scottish Gaelic: Ailean Moireasdan) was a sea captain from Crossbost on the Isle of Lewis. He was due to marry Campbell on the island of Scalpay in the spring of 1788, and sailed from Stornoway for the marriage. A storm wrecked the ship on rocks off the Shiant Islands and Morrison's body was washed up on the coast of the islands. Campbell wrote the lament after hearing of the loss of Morrison.

Campbell is thought to have wasted away through grief and died a few months later. Due to the lack of soil on Scalpay, her father took her body by boat to a cemetery on the Isle of Harris. A second storm caused the coffin to be washed off of the boat and her body washed up close to the spot where Morrison's body had been found. Some versions of the story have the ship's crew throwing Campbell's coffin overboard as the storm threatens their lives, with the sea immediately becoming calm afterwards.

== Usage ==
Tiesto – A Tear in the Open

A version produced by Scottish band Capercaillie was the theme for the 1995 film Rob Roy. Karen Matheson of the band appeared in the film singing "Ailein Duinn" at a cèilidh. The song, which features guest musician Davy Spillane playing uillean pipes, was included on Capercaillie's 1995 album To The Moon and was released as a single under the title "Dark Alan (Ailein Duinn)".

As well as being included on To The Moon, the 1995 Capercaillie recording of "Ailein Duinn" appeared on the soundtrack album to the film Rob Roy and has featured on compilation albums produced by the band. Irish singer Méav Ní Mhaolchatha recorded a version of the song on her debut album Méav in 1998 and this version of the song has appeared on a number of Celtic music compilation albums. It has also been recorded by artists such as Australian harpist Siobhán Owen, Austrian early music ensemble Quadriga Consort, and Spanish dark pagan folk band Trobar de Morte. A version by BBC Radio Scotland Young Traditional Musician 2007 winner Catriona Watt was included on the 2010 compilation album Celtic Woman 4.

Matheson's vocal track was sampled by Spectrasonics and included in the Vocal Planet library. It has subsequently been used by a number of electronic artists and DJs, including on the 2002 track "A Tear in the Open" by Dutch DJ Tiësto. Other artists to have used the sample include Pole Folder in 2002 and Freemasons in 2007. The melody and parts of the song were used by Troels Folmann to compose the main theme for the Tomb Raider: Legend video game. The sample has also been used on a number of other video game soundtracks.

== Lyrics ==
There are many versions of the lyrics and of the melody, with recordings in the Tobar an Dualchais – Kist o Riches archive with five, eight, and twelve verses. In common with many Gaelic songs, the chorus includes vocables. These are the untranslated words in the lyrics below.

Gura mise tha fo éislean
Moch sa mhaduinn is mi 'g éirigh

Sèist:
Ò hì shiùbhlainn leat
Hì ri bhò hò ru bhì
Hì ri bhò hò rinn o ho
Ailein Duinn, ò hì shiubhlainn leat

Ma 's e 'n cluasag dhut a' ghaineamh
Ma 's e leabaidh dhut an fheamainn

Ma 's e 'n t-iasg do choinnlean geala
Ma 's e na ròin do luchd-faire

Dh'òlainn deoch ge b' oil le càch e
De dh'fhuil do choim 's tu 'n déidh do bhathadh

How sorrowful I am
When I rise early in the morning

Chorus:
Ò hì, I would go with you
Hì ri bhò hò ru bhì
Hì ri bhò hò rinn o ho
Brown-haired Alan, ò hì, I would go with you

If the sand be your pillow
If the seaweed be your bed

If the fish are your candles bright
If the seals are your watchmen

I would drink, though all would abhor
Of your heart's blood after you were drowned

—Version used in the 1995 film Rob Roy. The chorus is sung after each two-line verse,
