= The Reeling (album) =

Studio album by Brìghde Chaimbeul
- Released: 18 January 2019
- Venues: East Church, Cromarty, Scotland
- Length: 36:36
- Label: River Lea
- Producer: Aidan O'Rourke

Solo studio album chronology
The Reeling (2019)	Carry Them with Us (2023)

The Reeling is the debut studio album by the Scottish piper Brìghde Chaimbeul, released on 18 January 2019 by River Lea Recordings, an imprint of Rough Trade Records. Produced by Aidan O'Rourke of Lau, it was recorded live in a church at Cromarty on the Black Isle, with O'Rourke on fiddle, Radie Peat of Lankum on concertina and the singer Rona Lightfoot as guests; Chaimbeul plays the Scottish smallpipes and harmonium. Its eleven tracks are drawn mostly from Scottish Gaelic tradition, with two Bulgarian tunes.

The album was well received. Jude Rogers gave it four stars out of five in The Guardian, and Tom Bolton of The Quietus called it "unique, exciting and forward-looking". The Quietus placed The Reeling ninth in its albums of 2019, and the record was longlisted for that year's Scottish Album of the Year Award.

== Background and recording ==
Chaimbeul has said that from the moment she won the BBC Radio 2 Young Folk Award in 2016 she "wanted to record something". A Saltire Society bursary took her to Bulgaria in March 2017, where she encountered the country's piping tradition; two of the tunes she recorded came out of that visit.

She was the first artist to sign to River Lea, a new folk imprint of Rough Trade. The Quietus described the label as "a new traditional music outlet set up by Rough Trade's Geoff Travis, Jeannette Lee and Tim Chipping", and KLOF Mag quoted the label's mission statement as "dedicated to releasing beautiful and strange music from Britain, Ireland and beyond". Chipping recalled that Travis "simply asked if I would like to have my own imprint on Rough Trade, to release traditional folk music". By 2019 the label had three artists: Chaimbeul, Lisa O'Neill and Ye Vagabonds.

The album was recorded in the East Church at Cromarty, which The Quietus described as "a simple, barn-like building with an austere Georgian interior, and an ancient history". KLOF Mag credited O'Rourke with "the thoughtful production of the album, enlisting engineer Iain Hutchison to capture the special sonic qualities of the occasion". Chaimbeul has since described the record as "recorded in a church and it's pretty much live", and, comparing it with her later work, said that "My first doesn't really have a theme, it's just a collection of tunes that I love, that I loved to play at the time". The harmonium heard on the opening track was, in KLOF Mag's account, "an ancient, slightly creaky harmonium that Brìghde found in the church by happenstance".

Rona Lightfoot, who was 82 at the time of release, had first inspired Chaimbeul to take up the pipes when Chaimbeul was four years old. Chaimbeul told The Skinny that signing to River Lea "was also the moment I was like, 'I'd love to have Rona on it as a tribute.'" The same interview reports that she dedicated the album to Konstantin Kosmidis, a Greek neighbour who had introduced her to the chanter as a child and who died shortly before it came out.

== Composition ==
The Reeling collects eleven tracks and runs for 36 minutes and 36 seconds. Ten of them are traditional pieces arranged by Chaimbeul, in several cases with O'Rourke or Lightfoot; the sixth track pairs two dance tunes composed by Donald MacLeod and Archie Lindsay.

The opening "O Chiadain an Lo" and the "Harris Dance" half of the fourth track both come from "the 1784 Patrick MacDonald Collection of Highland/Gaelic tunes", according to KLOF Mag; the same review identifies the closing "Ruidhle Mo Nighean Donn" as a traditional puirt à beul. "Moma e Moma Rodila" and "Tornala Maika" are the two Bulgarian tunes. Writing in The Guardian, Rogers described the Scottish and Bulgarian material as sitting together comfortably, with "Moma e Moma Rodila sitting with ease next to Tàladh Nan Cearc".

KLOF Mag reports that Lightfoot "chants the canntaireachd on three tracks", and that Peat and O'Rourke each play on three.

== Release ==
The Reeling appeared on 18 January 2019, under the catalogue number RLR003, as a download and streaming release, on compact disc and on vinyl LP. The sleeve, Chipping said, "was a collaboration between Brìghde, the artist Alex Merry and myself".

== Critical reception ==
Jude Rogers awarded the album four stars out of five in The Guardian, finding it "simultaneously ancient and modern, profound and direct". She credited O'Rourke's production with drawing out the textural potential of the breaths and creaks of Chaimbeul's sound, and described the effect of the three guests as trance-like and immediate.

Tom Bolton, reviewing it for The Quietus five days after release, wrote that "the clean notes of the Scottish smallpipes seem almost to play themselves, cascading from the instrument like water", and concluded that the four musicians had produced "a unique, exciting and forward-looking album".

Paul Mansfield, in The Living Tradition, wrote that the tunes "really got under my skin on repeated listens", described O'Rourke's accompaniment as "very subtle", and called the result "a distinctive and rather wonderful album". Devon Léger of Folk Alley likened Chaimbeul's drones to "peat-blackened water running through a bog" and judged that, despite the presence of O'Rourke and Peat, "the shape of the music seems to be Chaimbeul's own". For Michele Mele in Bright Young Folk, Chaimbeul had "created something sensational and unique, pushing the boundaries of traditional music a bit further". David Kidman of KLOF Mag wrote that, although the release had been marked by a concert at Celtic Connections, "the disc will form a more permanent experience that will prove every bit as special in its own atmospheric way".

Looking back on the record in his AllMusic biography of Chaimbeul, John D. Buchanan characterised it as "Consisting largely of ancient and forgotten traditional tunes" and said "it had an experimental flavor and raw, murky production".

== Accolades ==
The Quietus ranked The Reeling ninth in its albums of the year for 2019. The album was longlisted for the 2019 Scottish Album of the Year Award.

== Track listing ==
Track titles and durations from the album's Bandcamp release page; composition and arrangement credits from the Mainly Norfolk discography. Traditional tracks are arranged by Chaimbeul, in several cases jointly with O'Rourke or Lightfoot.

The Reeling
No.	Title	Writer(s)	Length
1.	"O Chiadain an Lo"	Traditional	5:18
2.	"A Bhriogais Uallach / Highean Donn nan Gobhar"	Traditional	3:32
3.	"Moma e Moma Rodila"	Traditional	4:02
4.	"An Léimras / Harris Dance"	Traditional	3:56
5.	"Tàladh Nan Cearc"	Traditional	1:56
6.	"The Old Woman's Dance / The Skylarks's Ascension"	Donald MacLeod, Archie Lindsay	4:27
7.	"Gur Bòidheach Nighean Donn Mo Chridhe"	Traditional	3:20
8.	"Tornala Maika"	Traditional	3:15
9.	"Tha 'n oidhch' ann 's an dorch' ann"	Traditional	1:44
10.	"Mary Brennan's / The Reeling, The Reeling"	Traditional	3:20
11.	"Ruidhle Mo Nighean Donn"	Traditional	1:46
Total length:			36:36

== Personnel ==
Credits adapted from the Mainly Norfolk discography.

- Brìghde Chaimbeul – Scottish smallpipes, harmonium, arrangements
- Aidan O'Rourke – fiddle, arrangements; production, mixing
- Radie Peat – concertina
- Rona Lightfoot – canntaireachd and song, arrangements
- Iain Hutchison – recording, mixing
- Nick Watson – mastering
- Alex Merry – artwork
- Tim Chipping – design
- Juliette Lemoine – photography
