= Lori Watson =

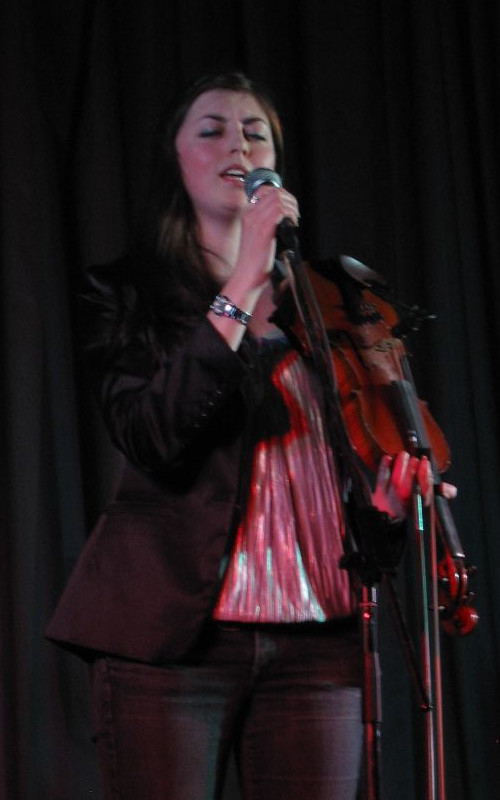
- Watson in 2008

Background information
- Born: Scottish Borders
- Genres: Scottish folk music, traditional, celtic
- Occupations: Singer, instrumentalist, researcher, teacher
- Instruments: Fiddle, voice
- Years active: 2003 – present
- Label: ISLE Music Scotland
- Formerly of: Rule of Three; Boreas
- Website: loriwatson.net

Lori Watson is a fiddle player and folk singer who performs traditional and contemporary folk music. She is the first doctor of Artistic Research in Scottish Music.

== Biography ==
Watson grew up in the Scottish Borders where she was a founder member of The Small Hall Band and played in the Clarty Cloot Ceilidh Band. She studied Scottish music at the Royal Scottish Academy of Music and Drama in Glasgow and graduated in 2003. She completed a PhD in Contemporary Innovation and Traditional Music in Scotland. She performs traditional, contemporary and original folk music and sings in Scots and English.

Watson is from a musical Scots/Irish family. Her great-grandfather Peter Augustus Meechan was a popular fiddle player in Glasgow, her grandfather Alexander Watson played accordion and everyone in the family sang. Today, her father sings and plays guitar, bouzouki and mandolin, and her mother sings and plays bodhran. Their small, independent record label, ISLE Music Scotland, owned and run by the family, issued the Borders Young Fiddles CD, a landmark in Scottish / Borders fiddle music, and Watson's debut in 2006, :Three. Watson's brother Innes Watson, graduated from the RSAMD in 2006 and is building a career as a full-time musician.

== Awards ==
- Borders Young Musician Award 1999
- BBC Radio Scotland Young Traditional Musician 2002 finalist
- BBC Radio Scotland Young Traditional Musician 2003 finalist
- Celtic Connections Danny Kyle Award 2005
- Eiserner Eversteiner nominee 2007
- Burnsong Winner 2007
- MG ALBA Scots Trad Music Awards Scots Singer of the Year 2016

== Bands ==
- Lori Watson and Rule of Three
  - Lori Watson – vocals and fiddle
  - Innes Watson – guitars, harmony vocals
  - John Somerville – piano accordion
  - Donald Hay – percussion
  - Duncan Lyall – double bass
- Boreas
  - Lori Watson – vocals (Scots) and fiddles
  - Britt Pernille Frøholm – hardanger and fiddles
  - Rachel Newton – harp and vocals (Gaelic)
  - Irene Tillung – chromatic accordion
- Watson/Black
  - Lori Watson – fiddles and vocals (Scots/English)
  - Fiona Black – accordion
- Fireside Music Company
  - Lori Watson – fiddle, song, scripted speech
  - Margaret Bennett – storytelling and song
- Border Fiddles
  - Lori Watson – fiddle
  - Shona Mooney – fiddle
  - Innes Watson – fiddle
  - Rachel Cross – fiddle
  - Carly Blain – fiddle
  - Sandy Watson – guitar and bouzouki

== Discography ==
- Borders Young Fiddles, by Borders Young Fiddles, Borders Traditional Series Vol. 3, ISLE Music Scotland, 2004
- :Three, by Lori Watson with Fiona Young, Innes Watson & Barry (Spad) Reid, ISLE Music Scotland, 2006
- No.1 Scottish, Traditional Music from the RSAMD, RSAMD, 2002, Greentrax, 2007
- Pleasure's Coin, by Lori Watson and Rule of Three, ISLE Music Scotland, 2009
- Borders Tunesmiths, by Borders Tunesmiths, Borders Traditions Series Vol. 6, 2009
- The Songs of Sandy Wright, by Various, Navigator Records, 2010
- The Rough Guide To Scottish Music, by Various, The Rough Guide, 2010

== Projects ==
=== Contemporary innovation and traditional music in Scotland ===
Lori Watson completed doctoral studies at the RCS in Glasgow and St Andrews University in 2013. She investigated innovation and beyond-tune composition by traditional musicians in Scotland including a substantial folio of new and experimental musical works. Her supervisors were Dr. Stephen Broad, Dr. Liz Doherty, Dr. Stuart Eydmann and Prof. Raymond MacDonald.

=== James Hogg, a Life in Music ===
This concert featuring the work and life of James Hogg in music, song, poetry and monologue was co-written with Innes Watson and John Nicol, and was performed and recorded live at Both Sides of the Tweed music festival in Selkirk, 2005.

=== MAELSTRØM - Legends of the Underworld ===
Watson wrote the music for this devised theatrical production at the Aberdeen International Arts Festival in 2016. The project was produced by Youth Music Theatre UK. Blending Scottish and Norwegian musical influences following the journey of 'Hag' to the heart of the Corryvreckan maelstrom, a powerful place where the essences of Scotland and Norway meet.

== Teaching ==
Watson was a lecturer and examiner at the Royal Conservatoire of Scotland (RCS) including Contemporary Studies, Honours Projects, Scots Song and Principal Study Song Group. She leads the Tolbooth Traditional Music Project for young people and teaches workshops at folk festivals like the now-defunct Border Gaitherin and the Scots Fiddle Festival. She was a Senior Tutor at Glasgow Fiddle Workshop for 10 years and taught fiddle on the Folk and Traditional Music degree at Newcastle University for six years. She is currently a lecturer in Scottish Ethnology at the University of Edinburgh.

== Articles ==
- Broad, Stephen (2006). 'Practice-based Research at the Royal Scottish Academy of Music and Drama' in Konstnarlig forskning: Artiklar, Prjektrapporter & Reportage ed. Torbjorn Lind (Stockholm: Swedish Research Council, 2005), pp. 17–25.
