= Alistair Iain Paterson =

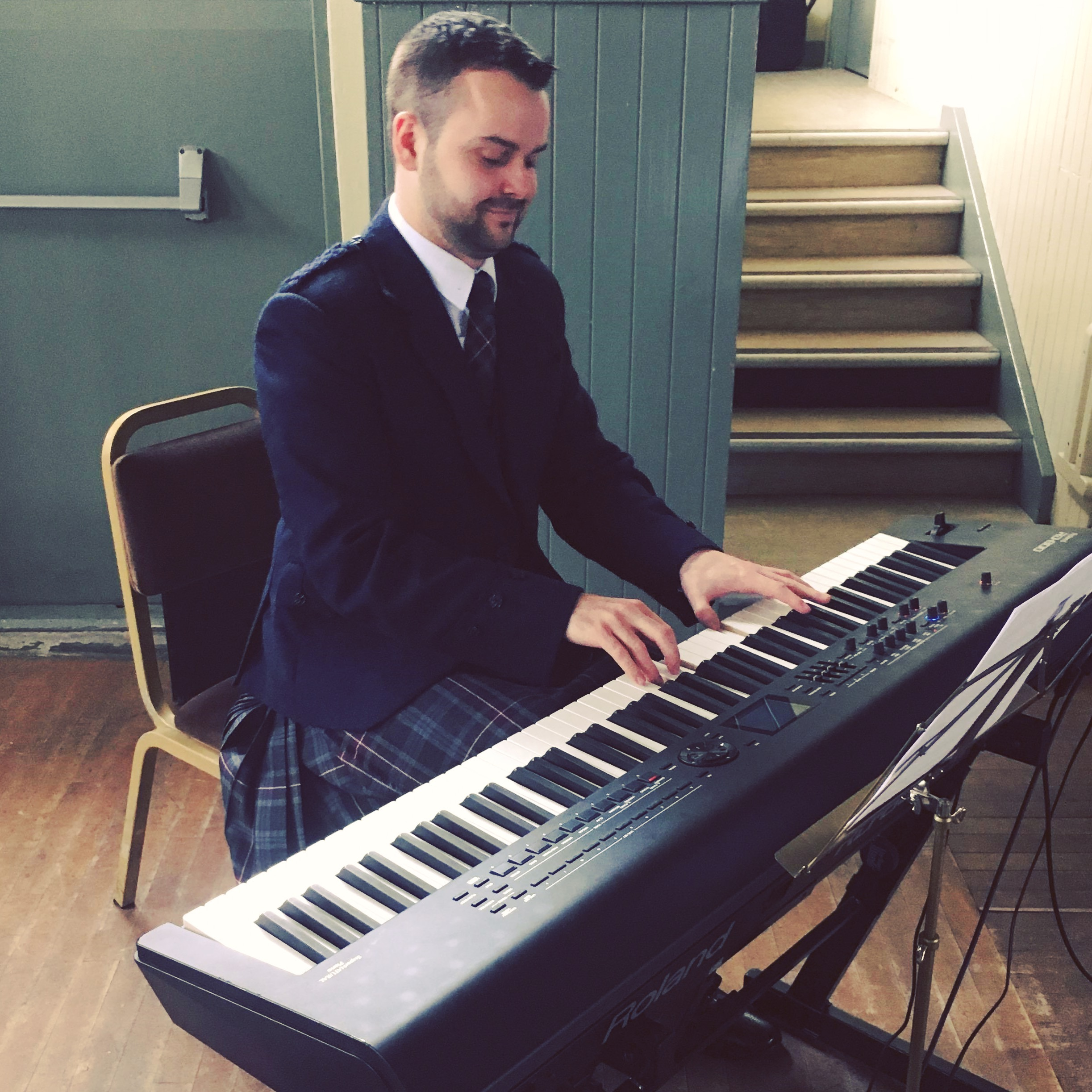

Background information
- Born: 29 March 1991 (age 34); Glasgow, Scotland
- Origin: Bishopton, Renfrewshire, Scotland
- Genres: Folk music
- Occupation: Musician
- Instruments: Piano, harmonium, pipes

Alistair Iain Paterson is a Scottish musician and composer from the village of Bishopton, Renfrewshire. He is one of the founding members of the Scottish folk band Barluath.

== Musical career ==
Paterson studied on the BA Honours Scottish Music programme at the Royal Conservatoire of Scotland and graduated in 2013. He is most well known for playing the piano and the harmonium. He is also a piper and previously played with Johnstone Pipe Band. In 2014 he was a finalist in the BBC Scotland Young Traditional Musician of the Year competition. In 2016 he became a member of staff within the traditional music department of the Royal Conservatoire of Scotland. Since November 2014, Paterson has been involved in a number of Live Music Now (Scotland) projects alongside Gaelic singer Ainsley Hamill and fellow members of Barluath. In January 2018, Paterson was a member of the house band for "Òrain nan Gàidheal: Songs of the Gael" as part of Celtic Connections. This televised concert featured a variety of contemporary Gaelic singers accompanied by the BBC Scottish Symphony Orchestra.

== Barluath ==
Paterson is a founding member of Scottish folk band Barluath. Barluath showcase both the traditional and contemporary music of Scotland, Ireland and America. The band is formed of four main members, all graduates of the Royal Conservatoire of Scotland. Paterson on piano, harmonium and backing vocals, Ainsley Hamill on lead vocals and step-dance, Eddie Seaman on whistle and highland and border bagpipes, and Eilidh Firth on fiddle and backing vocals.

== Skipinnish ==
In 2017, Paterson began working with the Scottish band Skipinnish as their regular touring keyboard player before his departure in 2025.

== Associated acts ==
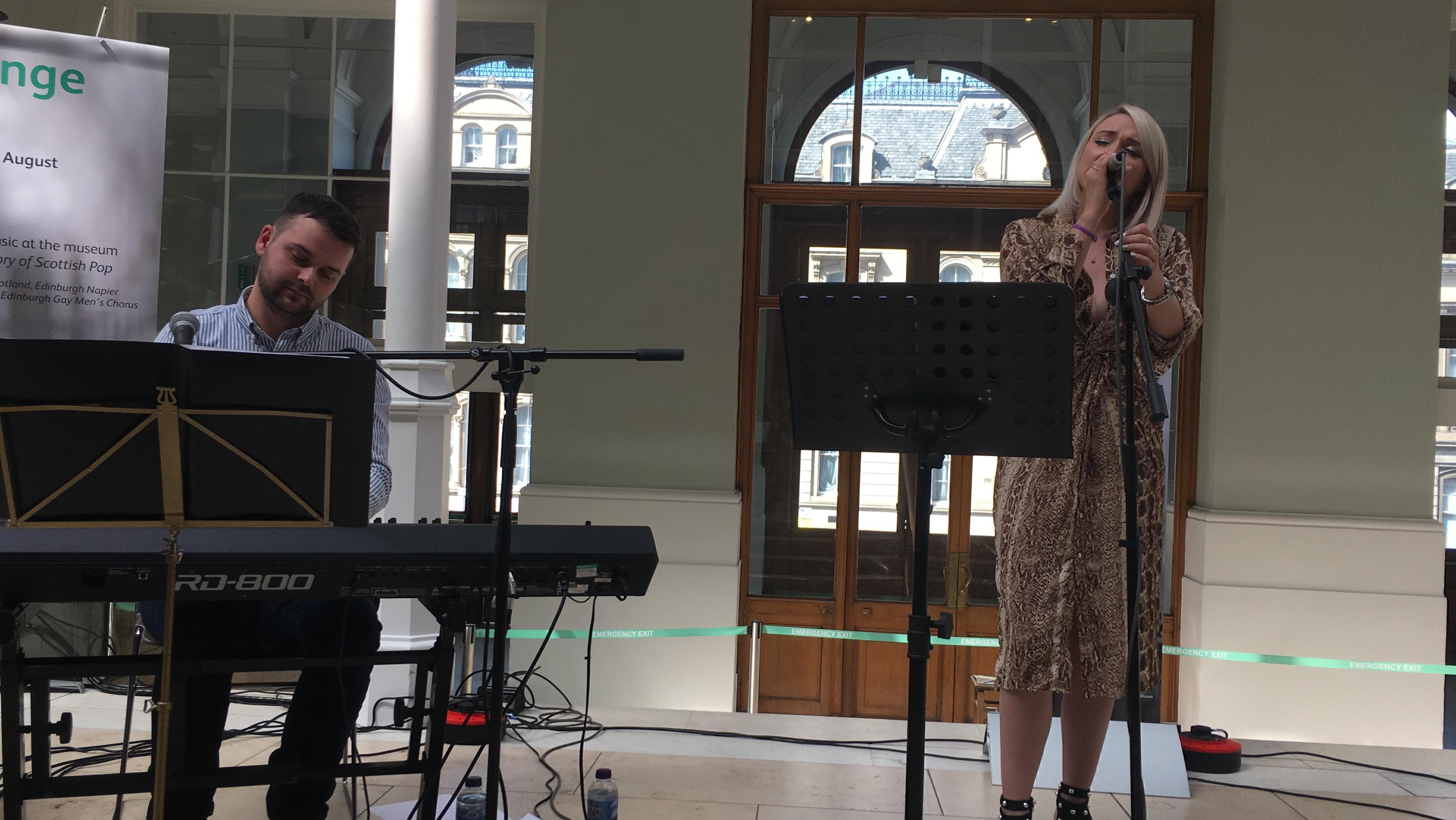
Alistair Iain Paterson performing with Ainsley Hamill. Live Music Now Free Fringe Music 2018.

Paterson has worked with a number of musicians from across the traditional music scene, and most recently featured on Patsy Reid's album A Glint o' Scottish Fiddle, which was released in February 2018. He predominantly works with artists such as Robyn Stapleton, Mairi Thérèse Gilfedder and Ainsley Hamill in a number of different formats.

== Discography ==
=== Barluath ===
- Source (2012)
- At Dawn of Day (2015)

=== Featured artist ===
==== Skipinnish ====
- The Seventh Wave (2017)
- Steer by the Stars (2019)

==== Robyn Stapleton ====
- Fickle Fortune (2015)
- The Songs of Robert Burns (2017)

==== Patsy Reid ====
- A Glint o' Scottish Fiddle (2018)
