= Joy Dunlop =

Scottish step dancer, journalist, presenter

- Origin: Connel, Argyll, Scotland
- Genres: Gaelic; celtic; folk
- Occupations: Singer; dancer; broadcaster; journalist
- Instrument: Vocals
- Label: Sradag Music
- Website: joydunlop.com

Joy Dunlop is a Scottish broadcaster, singer, step dancer and educator from the village of Connel in Argyll, who now lives in Glasgow, Scotland. Singing predominantly in Scottish Gaelic, she performs folk music, song and dance in a contemporary style rooted in the tradition. She is a weather presenter for BBC Scotland and BBC ALBA and formerly a volunteer radio presenter with Oban FM

== Career ==
Dunlop graduated from Sabhal Mòr Ostaig with an honours immersion degree in Gaelic Language and Culture, and won the Anna NicDhonnchaidh prize for her efforts in promoting and supporting Gaelic in the community. Initially working as a Gaelic Development Officer for An Comunn Gàidhealach, she decided to pursue a full-time music career in 2010, and has since worked as a singer and TV and radio presenter.

=== Music ===
Dunlop has performed throughout the world as both a solo and collaborative performer. Nominated as 'Gaelic Singer of the Year' in 2010, 2011 and 2016 at the MG ALBA Scots Trad Music Awards, she released her debut album Dùsgadh / Awakening in 2010 to great acclaim, winning the Scottish New Music Award's "Roots Recording of the Year", a 4 star review in the Scotsman' and being named "Album of the Month" in The Scots Magazine. She released the collaborative album, Fiere in 2012 with Scottish fiddle and harp duo Twelfth Day, touring the album around the UK and Ireland. In 2013, Dunlop launched her second solo album, Faileasan (Reflections) which was wholly created in her native home of Argyll. This was described as, "The rare disc that will fly with both the Gaelic scholar and the modern music fan" by the Huffington Post.

Her debut duo album with her brother Andrew Dunlop, under the name Joy&Andrew and entitled Dithis | Duo, was released in March 2020.

Dunlop has performed at numerous international festivals including Celtic Colours, Nova Scotia, Schotland Festival, Holland and Celtic Connections, Scotland. She has toured in the past with Scottish harp player Rachel Hair in the UK and Japan and recorded two songs on her album, The Lucky Smile.

A regular Gaelic singing competitor, Dunlop won the gold medal at the Royal National Mòd in 2010, the Oban Times Gold medal and Puirt-a-Beul competitions 2006 amongst others. She was also the lead singer of winning traditional groups at the Pan Celtic Festival in seven occasions. She won Traditional Singer of the Year and Traditional Dance Champion at the 2015 Pan Celtic Festival, the only person to have won both awards.

Dunlop is also heavily involved in Gaelic choral music as the conductor of Còisir Ceann an Tuirc, Argyll's male voice Gaelic choir who won Gold at the 2008, 2015 and 2019 Royal National Mòd under her directorship. She is also Gaelic tutor and member of Argyll ladies' choir Atomic Piseag and was Gaelic tutor for and member of Taynuilt Gaelic Choir. She is a founding member of Dealrach, an Argyll-based female a cappella quartet who won National Mòd Gold at their first-ever outing in 2008.

In 2019, she created and conducted the Alba Choir, who represented Scotland at the Eurovision Choir competition in Gothenburg, Sweden. A documentary about the experience was broadcast on BBC Alba, with a follow-on programme broadcast on Christmas Day 2019. The choir's Eurovision experience won the International Contribution to Gaelic category 2019's Scottish Gaelic Awards.

=== Media ===
Dunlop is a weather presenter on BBC Scotland. For BBC Alba, she has performed or presented on music programmes Horo Gheallaidh, Guthan nan Gàidheal, Sorchar nan Reul and Ar n-Aran Làitheil, and was a featured speaker on Cunntas, Craic and Barail Bhoireannach, debating current issues, and starred in the series Leadaidh is Breacaist. She made her acting debut in 2007 as a character in the Gaelic comedy PC Alasdair Stiùbhaird for BBC, and presented the third series of the popular Bainnsean (Weddings) series produced by purpleTV for BBC Alba. In 2020 she co-presented BBC Radio Scotland's Young Traditional Musician competition, with musician Bruce MacGregor.

As a pupil at Oban High School, she was a volunteer presenter with local community radio Oban FM in the late 1990s and early 2000s until she moved away from Oban to study at Sabhal Mor Obstaig. She returned to Oban FM in early 2006 to present a weekly live show called Ceol agus Craic that aired on a Monday evening between 5 - 6pm.

Dunlop wrote a monthly column in the now defunct Gaelic newspaper "An Gàidheal Ùr" and was highly commended in the first-ever Gaelic Journalist section at the 2008 Highlands and Islands Media Awards. and shortlisted in the Gaelic Journalist of the Year category in the same year for the Scottish Press Awards. Dunlop has written for The Oban Times and Cothrom magazine produced by Clì Gàidhlig.

=== Gaelic development work ===
She held the full-time post of Gaelic development officer in Argyll, Bute and the Islands for An Comunn Gaidhealach from 2004 to 2010 and has also worked as Gaelic Instructor in residence for Fèis Mhàbu in Cape Breton and with communities in New Zealand promoting and developing Gaelic language and song. Dunlop has taught courses for Sabhal Mòr Ostaig, Clì Gàidhlig, CNSA and is both a written and simultaneous translator, guest speaker and MC for events and conferences in the UK and further afield. She is also a local and Royal National Mòd adjudicator for both Gaelic and music.

=== Dance ===
A trained ballet dancer, Dunlop started stepdancing as a teenager and in 2006, was named the Inter-Celtic Dance Champion. She has danced at festivals throughout the UK and Ireland, in addition to researching stepdancing in Cape Breton, Nova Scotia. In 2015, she was named the Traditional Dancer of the Year at the International Pan Celtic Festival 2015, the only person ever to have won both the Traditional Singer and Traditional Dancer of the Year competitions, in the same year or otherwise.

== Discography ==
=== Solo recordings ===
- Caoir (2023)
- Faileasan/Reflections (2013)
- Dùsgadh (2010)

=== Collaborative albums ===
- Dithis | Duo – JoyandAndrew (2020)
- LAS – LAS (2017)
- Fiere – Joy Dunlop & Twelfth Day (2012)

=== With others ===
- In the Wild Country – Music Makes Me (2016)
- Shore to Shore – Struileag (2014)
- Deich Bliadhna – Còisir Ceann an Tuirc (2013)
- Sincerely – Melody and Derrick Cameron (2010)
- The Lucky Smile – Rachel Hair (2009)
- Piseag Gu Leòr – Atomic Piseag (2006)
- Fo Sgàil Beinn Chruachain – Coisir Ghaidhlig Thaigh an Uillt (2006)
- Abair Ceòl – Ardsgoil an Obain (2004)
- Ceòlmhor Ostaig – Various artists (2004)

== Awards and nominations ==
- Traditional Singer of the Year – International Pan Celtic Festival 2015 (Winner)
- Traditional Dancer of the Year – International Pan Celtic Festival 2015 (Winner)
- Roots Recording of the Year – Scots New Music Awards 2011 (Winner)
- Gaelic Singer of the Year – MG ALBA Scots Trad Music Awards 2016, 2011 & 2010 (Nomination)
- The Tradition Award – Fatea Awards 2010 (Winner)
- Royal National Mòd Gold Medalist – 2010
- Gaelic Singer of the Year – MG ALBA Scots Trad Music Awards 2011 & 2010 (Nomination)
- Best Achievement for Argyll – For Argyll Awards 2009 (Runner up)
- Scottish Press Awards – Gaelic Journalist of the Year 2008 (Nomination)
- Highlands and Islands Media Awards – Gaelic Journalist of the Year 2007 (Highly Commended)
- Oban Times Mòd Gold Medalist – 2006
- Traditional Inter-Celtic Dance Champion 2006 – Pan Celtic International Festival
- Traditional singer of the year- Pan Celtic International Festival 2005 (Runner Up)
- Traditional group song competition – Pan Celtic International Festival 2005 (Winner)
- Traditional group song competition – Pan Celtic International Festival 2004 (Winner)
- Traditional group song competition – Pan Celtic International Festival 2003 (Winner)
