= Brìghde Chaimbeul =

Scottish bagpipe player (b. 1998)

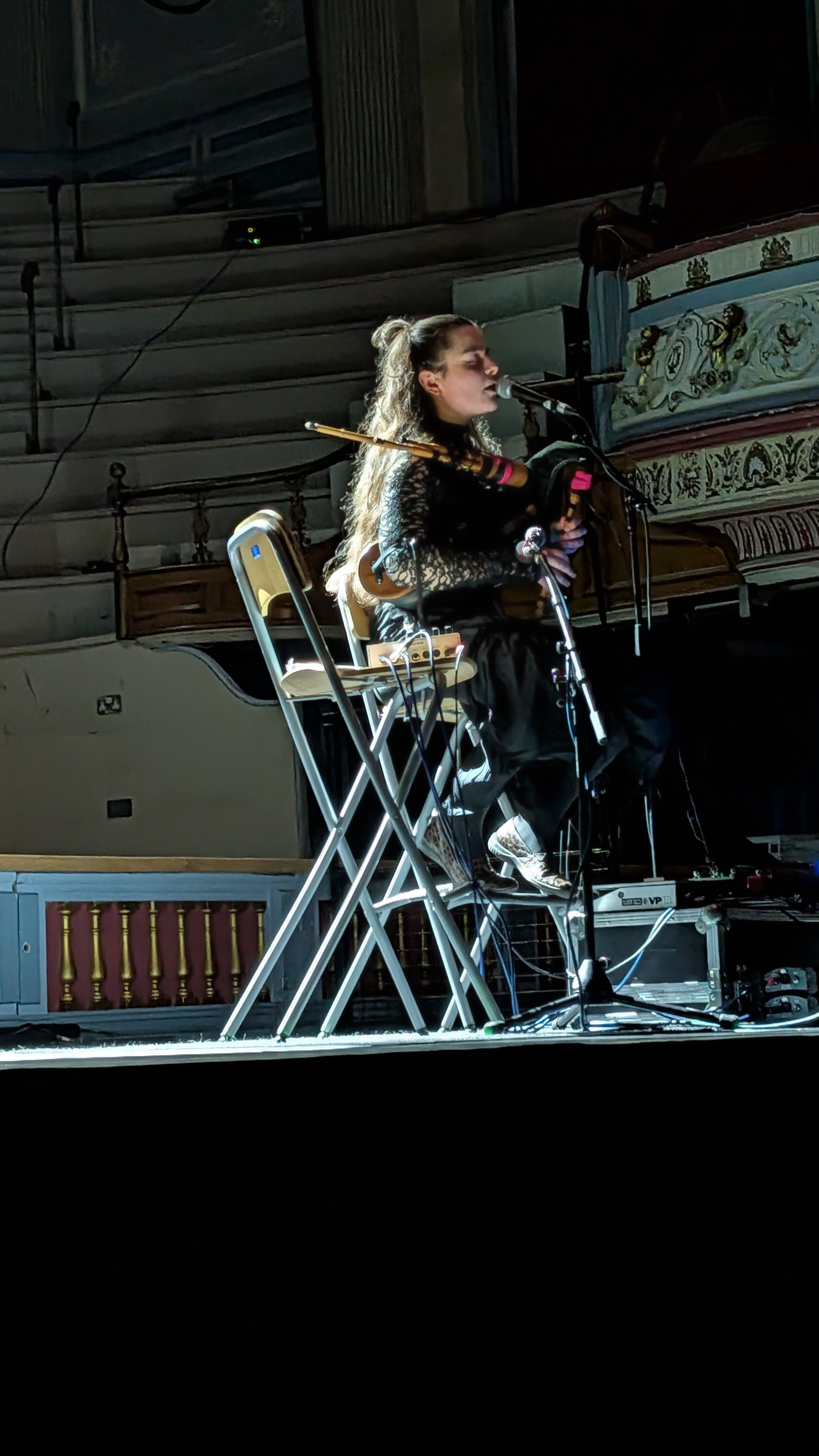

Background information
- Born: 1998 (age 27–28)
- Origin: Sleat, Isle of Skye, Scotland
- Instruments: Great Highland bagpipe, Scottish smallpipes
- Website: www.brichaimbeul.com

Brìghde Chaimbeul (Scottish Gaelic pronunciation: [ˈpɾʲiːʝtʲə]; BREECH-uh-KHYM-beell; born 1998) is a Scottish piper who plays the traditional Great Highland bagpipe and the revived Scottish smallpipes.

== Life ==
Chaimbeul was born in 1998 and brought up in Sleat on the Isle of Skye, and is a native Gaelic speaker.

She learned the fiddle and piano before taking up the pipes at the age of seven, having been inspired to learn the pipes after hearing Rona Lightfoot at the age of four. She received tuition from Niall Stewart, and competed successfully in solo competitions on the Great Highland bagpipe from a young age.

Along with her four siblings, she attended St Mary's Music School in Edinburgh, where she received tuition from Iain Speirs.

In 2014, Chaimbeul took up the Scottish smallpipes, being gifted a set by Hamish Moore, and received tuition on them from his son Fin Moore. A bursary from the Saltire Society allowed her to visit Bulgaria to study the piping tradition there, and her music has been influenced by Bulgarian, Irish, Scandinavian and Cape Breton traditions. Chaimbeul has worked extensively with Aidan O'Rourke, as well as Ross Ainslie, John McSherry, Paul Meehan, Martin Green, Carlos Núñez and Allan MacDonald. She appeared on Caroline Polachek's single "Blood & Butter" from Polachek's 2023 album Desire, I Want to Turn Into You as a soloist.

Chaimbeul won the BBC Radio 2 Young Folk Award in 2016, and the "Horizon Award" in the 2019 BBC Radio 2 Folk Awards. Her debut album The Reeling was recorded in 2019 in the Cromarty East Church, featuring Aidan O'Rourke, Radie Peat from Lankum, and Rona Lightfoot. She has played at events including Celtic Colours, Celtic Connections, and Piping Live. She played a Tiny Desk Concert on National Public Radio in October 2026.

Her older sisters Màiri and Steaphanaidh are harpists, her father Aonghas Phàdraig Caimbeul is a writer and broadcaster, and her mother Liondsaidh Chaimbeul is a sculptor.

== Discography ==
- The Reeling (2019)
- Las (2021), with Ross Ainslie and Steven Byrnes
- Carry Them With Us (2023), featuring Colin Stetson
- Sunwise (2025)
- All the light in the world (2026) with Colin Stetson
