= Ainsley Hamill =

- Origin: Cardross, Argyll and Bute, Scotland
- Genre: Folk music
- Occupations: Singer, teacher, songwriter
- Instrument: Vocals
- Website: www.ainsleyhamill.com

Ainsley Hamill is a Scottish singer and songwriter from the village of Cardross, who performs traditional songs in English, Scots, and Gaelic. She studied music at the Royal Conservatoire of Scotland, where she obtained a First Class Honours Degree in Scottish Music, with Gaelic Song as her principal study. She was tutored by Kenna Campbell and Màiri MacInnes.

Ainsley won the Silver Pendant at The Royal National Mòd held in Paisley in October 2013. She has competed in a number of Mòd competitions and made it to the final of the An Comunn Gàidhealach Gold Medal competition in 2014, and 2015. Ainsley was also a BBC Radio Scotland Young Traditional Musician finalist in 2014/15, and nominated for Gaelic Singer of the Year at the 2015 MG ALBA Scots Trad Music Awards.

== Discography ==
With Barluath

- Source (2012)
- At Dawn of Day (2015)

Solo

- Belle of the Ball (EP, 2019)
- Not Just Ship Land (2021)
- Fable (2025)
