= Skipinnish =

Scottish musical group

- Origin: Scottish Highlands and Islands
- Genre: Traditional Scottish
- Years active: 1999–present
- Label: Skipinnish Records
- Members: Angus MacPhail; Andrew Stevenson; James Stewart; Archie McAllister
- Past members: Robert Robertson; Ross Wilson; Kyle Orr; Jonathan Gillespie; Angus Tikka; Alasdair Murray; Alastair MacLean; Alistair Iain Paterson; Norrie MacIver; Rory Grindlay; Euan Malloch; Charlotte Printer
- Website: www.skipinnish.com

Skipinnish is a Scottish traditional music band from the Gàidhealtachd, singing primarily in English. The band was formed by Angus MacPhail and Andrew Stevenson in 1999 when they were both studying at the Royal Scottish Academy of Music and Drama (RSAMD) in Glasgow. Since 1999 the band has been operated by both MacPhail and Stevenson.

== Skipinnish brand ==
The Skipinnish brand is also operated by Angus MacPhail and Andrew Stevenson, and in the past has been used to market whisky. The brand also previously operated a cèilidh house named the Skipinnish Ceilidh House, which had locations in both Fort William and Oban.

== Members ==
The current line-up consists of:

- Angus MacPhail: Accordion, vocals
- Andrew Stevenson: Highland bagpipes, small pipes, whistles, fiddle

Regular touring musicians:

- Archie McAllister: Fiddle

Regular guest musicians include:

- Rachel Walker: Vocals
- Duncan Nicholson: Small pipes, bagpipes, whistles

Previous touring musicians:

- Norrie MacIver: Lead singer, guitar
- Robert Robertson: Lead singer, guitar, now the lead singer of Tide Lines
- Ross Wilson: Keyboard, bass
- Rory Grindlay: Drums
- Jonathan Gillespie: Keyboard, backing vocals
- Angus Tikka: Bass guitar
- Charlotte Printer: Bass guitar
- Kyle Orr: Small pipes, bagpipes, whistles
- Alistair Iain Paterson: Keyboards
- Alasdair Murray: Drums, Highland bagpipes
- Alastair MacLean: Bagpipes, whistles
- Euan Malloch: Electric Guitar

In 2016 Robertson was replaced by Norrie MacIver as new lead singer and Rory Grindlay also joined as drummer. They were joined by Alistair Iain Paterson on keyboards in 2017, Charlotte Printer on bass guitar in 2018 before Alastair MacLean (pipes/whistles) and Euan Malloch (electric guitar) completed the lineup in the following years.

In November 2025, Skipinnish announced that they had sacked MacIver, who told the BBC he had "no idea" he was going to be dropped. Three other members of the group – drummer Rory Grindlay, guitarist Euan Malloch and keyboardist Alistair Iain Paterson – announced they were leaving shortly after, though Malloch said his decision was independent of MacIver's sacking.

== Discography ==
=== Albums ===
- Skipinnish (2001)
- Sgurr Mor to Skerryvore (2003)
- Deoch 'N' Dorus (2005)
- The Sound of the Summer (2007)
- Live From The Ceilidh House (2009)
- The Wedding Dance (2010)
- Atlantic Roar (2013)
- Western Ocean (2014)
- The Seventh Wave (2017)
- Steer by the Stars (2019)

=== Singles / videography ===
- "Walking on the Waves" (2014)
- "December" (2014)
- "The Island" (2015)
- "Home on the Sea" (2016)
- "Alive" (2017)
- "Wishing Well" (2017)
- "Wishing Well" (2018) (re-released as a May 2018 to help with fundraising for a permanent memorial to Eilidh MacLeod from Barra who was killed in the Manchester Arena Bombing)
- "Summer Call" (2022)
- "Clearances Again" (2023)
- "Fuadaichean" (2023)
- "Eagle's Wing" (2024)
