= Hannah Rarity =

- Genres: Folk
- Occupations: Singer and songwriter
- Instrument: Vocals
- Years active: 2012–present
- Website: www.hannahrarity.com

Hannah Rarity is a Scottish singer and songwriter from Dechmont, West Lothian. In 2018, she was the winner of the BBC Radio Scotland Young Traditional Musician award, and her debut album Neath the Gloaming Star was nominated for Album of the Year at the Scots Trad Music Awards in 2019.

== Biography ==
Rarity was raised in Dechmont, West Lothian. She joined the National Youth Choir of Scotland at the age of eight, where she developed a favouring of traditional music. She studied film and television at Glasgow University for two years before switching to the Royal Conservatoire of Scotland in 2012, to study Scottish music.

In 2015, she was invited by Phil Cunningham, the artistic director of the traditional music department at the Royal Conservatoire, and Joanie Madden, to tour with Cherish the Ladies, touring internationally with them for two years while completing her studies.

In 2015, 2017 and 2021, she had a solo performance on BBC Scotland's Hogmanay Live.

In 2016, she released a six-track EP titled Beginnings. Her debut album, Neath the Gloaming Star, was crowdfunded and released independently in 2018. The album was nominated for Album of the Year at the 2019 Scots Trad Music Awards. The album was self-published due to the lack of publishing labels in Scotland and the prevalence of musicians having success with crowdfunding.

In 2018, she won the BBC Radio Scotland Young Traditional Musician award.

In 2021, she was co-musical director of the Opening Concert 'Neath the Gloaming Star' at Celtic Connections festival in Glasgow.
