= Ross Ainslie =

Scottish music artist

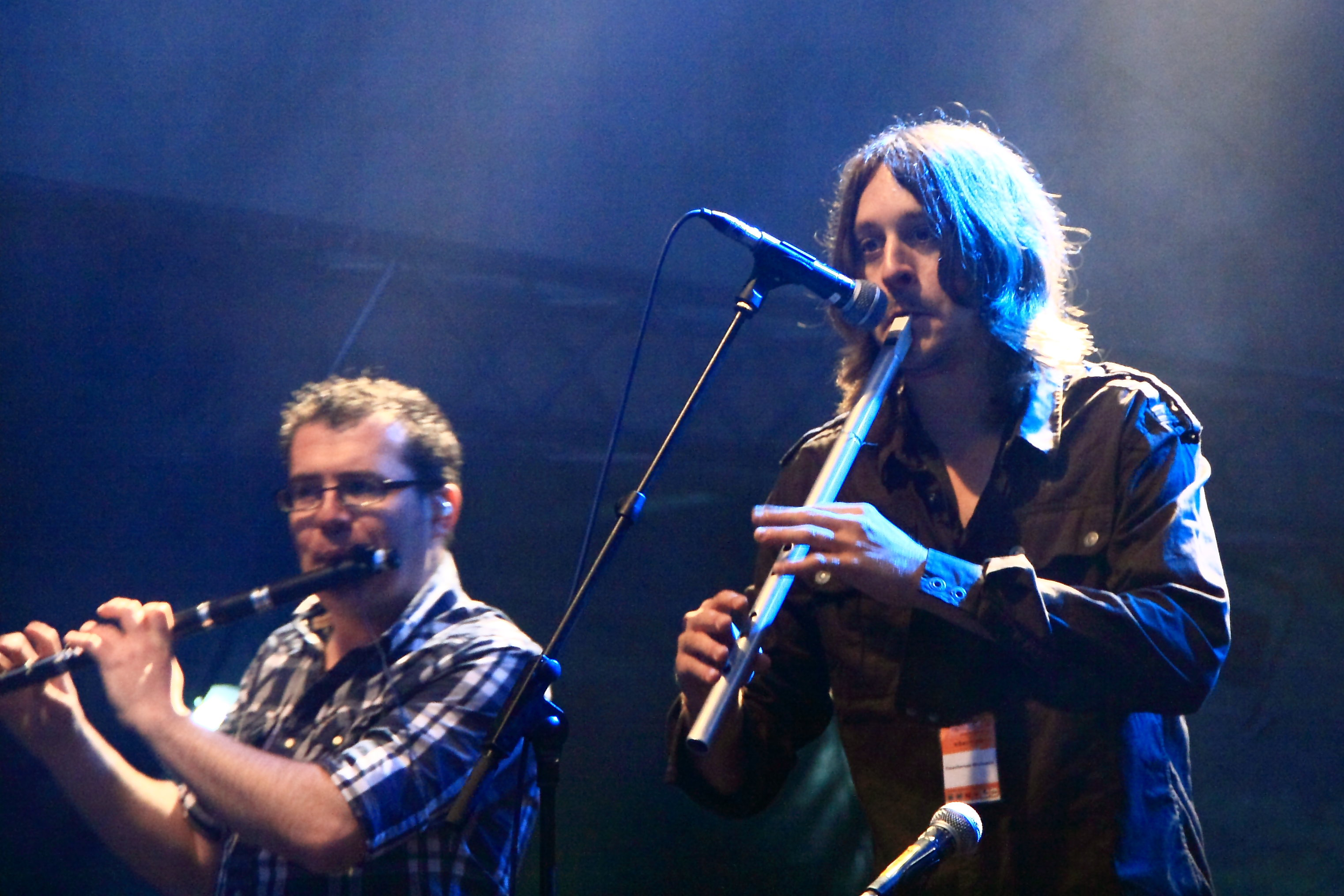
- Ainslie performing with Treacherous Orchestra at TFF.Rudolstadt 2011.

Background information
- Born: 1983 (age 42–43); Perthshire, Scotland
- Genres: Scottish traditional music; Celtic fusion; World music
- Occupations: Musician; Composer; Multi-instrumentalist; Lecturer
- Instruments: Highland pipes; smallpipes; Border pipes; Whistles; Cittern
- Years active: 2002–present
- Labels: Great White Records
- Formerly of: Treacherous Orchestra; Salsa Celtica; Ali Hutton; The Sanctuary Band
- Website: rossainslie.com

Ross Ainslie (born 1983) is a Scottish traditional musician, composer and multi-instrumentalist. He plays highland pipes, smallpipes, border pipes, whistles and cittern, and is known for incorporating global influences including jazz, rock and Indian classical music into Scottish traditional music.

Ainslie is a founding member of the Celtic fusion group Treacherous Orchestra and a member of Salsa Celtica. He frequently collaborates with fellow piper Ali Hutton, with whom he won Best Duo at the BBC Radio 2 Folk Awards in 2017. As a solo artist, he has released five albums exploring personal and philosophical themes. He is a lecturer in bagpipes at the Royal Conservatoire of Scotland.

== Early life and education ==
Ainslie was born in Perthshire, Scotland, in 1983. He began learning the chanter at age eight, initially giving up the instrument before returning to take lessons with tutor Norrie Sinclair. At eleven, he joined the Vale of Atholl Novice Junior Band in Pitlochry, where he came under the mentorship of pipe major Gordon Duncan. Duncan's unconventional teaching methods, which included encouraging students to improvise along to rock music and play pipes in fusion settings with guitars and bouzoukis, proved formative for Ainslie's later musical approach. It was during this period that he formed his musical partnership with Ali Hutton.

Ainslie studied traditional music at the Royal Scottish Academy of Music and Drama (now the Royal Conservatoire of Scotland) in Glasgow. In 2002, he was a finalist in the BBC Radio Scotland Young Traditional Musician of the Year competition.

== Career ==
Ainslie's musical career spans collaborative projects, solo recordings, live performance and education. His compositional style blends Scottish traditional music with influences from Indian classical music, jazz, rock music and world music traditions, reflecting the mentorship of Gordon Duncan, who was known for placing bagpipes in unconventional musical settings.

Ainslie co-founded Treacherous Orchestra in 2009, an 11-piece instrumental group that blends traditional Scottish music with rock and punk elements. The band has released two albums: Origins (2012) and Grind (2015), with the latter winning Album of the Year at the MG ALBA Scots Trad Music Awards in 2015. He has also been a member of Salsa Celtica, which fuses Scottish and Irish traditional music with Latin salsa and has toured internationally.

His most frequent collaboration is with Ali Hutton, with whom he has released three Symbiosis albums (2016, 2018, 2020). The duo won Best Duo at the BBC Radio 2 Folk Awards in 2017. Other notable partnerships include recordings with Irish uilleann piper Jarlath Henderson, Scottish smallpiper Brìghde Chaimbeul and English multi-instrumentalist Tim Edey.

As a solo artist, Ainslie's debut album Wide Open (2013) incorporated Scottish, Breton, Indian and jazz elements. Remembering (2015) featured his songwriting and vocals for the first time. From 2017, he began a trilogy of concept albums exploring themes of personal healing and self-discovery: Sanctuary (2017), Vana (2020), and Pool (2024). These later works feature expanded instrumentation including Indian classical instruments and collaborations with jazz and classical musicians. Ainslie's compositions are characterized by strong melodic content and complex, multi-layered arrangements that often move beyond traditional tune structures. Several of his compositions have become popular in traditional music sessions. For live performances, he works with The Sanctuary Band, featuring musicians from Scotland's folk and jazz scenes.

In addition to performing, Ainslie lectures in bagpipes at the Royal Conservatoire of Scotland, teaching on both undergraduate and postgraduate traditional music programs.

In March 2023, Ainslie gained international media attention when he performed a bagpipe version of Dr. Dre's "Still D.R.E." for rapper Snoop Dogg upon his arrival at Glasgow Airport. The performance, which featured Snoop Dogg dancing on the tarmac, went viral on social media and was covered by major news outlets worldwide.

== Awards and recognition ==
Year	Award	Category	Result	Notes
2013	BBC Radio 2 Folk Awards	Musician of the Year	Nominated	
2014	BBC Radio 2 Folk Awards	Best Duo	Nominated	with Jarlath Henderson
2015	MG ALBA Scots Trad Music Awards	Composer of the Year	Won	
2015	MG ALBA Scots Trad Music Awards	Album of the Year	Won	for Treacherous Orchestra's Grind
2016	BBC Radio 2 Folk Awards	Musician of the Year	Nominated	
2017	BBC Radio 2 Folk Awards	Best Duo	Won	with Ali Hutton
2018	BBC Radio 2 Folk Awards	Musician of the Year	Nominated	
2018	BBC Radio 2 Folk Awards	Best Duo	Nominated	with Ali Hutton

== Discography ==
=== Solo albums ===
Year	Title	Label
2013	Wide Open	Great White Records
2015	Remembering	Great White Records
2017	Sanctuary	Great White Records
2020	Vana	Great White Records
2022	Live at the Gorbals (with The Sanctuary Band)	Great White Records
2024	Pool	Great White Records

=== Selected collaborative albums ===
Year	Title	Collaboration	Label
2008	Partners in Crime	with Jarlath Henderson	
2012	Origins	with Treacherous Orchestra	
2013	Air-Fix	with Jarlath Henderson	
2015	Grind	with Treacherous Orchestra	
2016	Symbiosis	with Ali Hutton	
2018	Symbiosis II	with Ali Hutton	
2020	Symbiosis III	with Ali Hutton	
2022	LAS	with Brìghde Chaimbeul and Steven Byrnes	
2023	Diad	with Tim Edey	
