= Mary Ann Kennedy (Scottish singer) =

Scottish musician (born 1967)

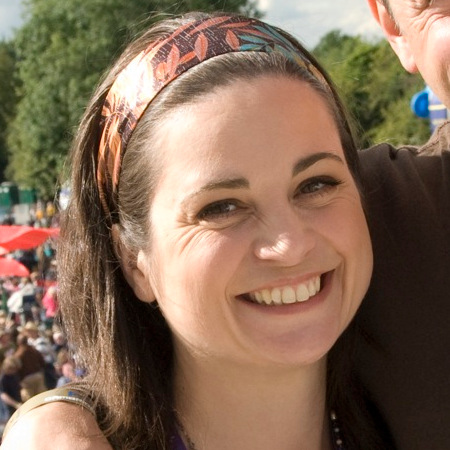
- Kennedy in 2007
- Born: 28 December 1967 (age 58); Glasgow, Scotland
- Education: Royal Scottish Academy of Music and Drama, Royal Northern College of Music
- Occupations: singer, musician, composer, broadcaster
- Parents: Alasdair Kennedy (father); Dr Kenna Campbell MBE (mother)
- Musical career
- Genres: Gaelic song and music
- Instruments: Vocals, harp, piano

Mary Ann Kennedy (Màiri Anna NicUalraig), (born 28 December 1967) is a Scottish musician, singer, choral director, composer, radio and television presenter, and music producer. Kennedy's awards include a Saltire Society Award for her Highland Festival commission, Lasair Dhè, and "Radio Presenter of the Year 2007" from the Celtic Media Festival.

== Background ==
Mary Ann Kennedy was born and brought up in Glasgow in a Gaelic-speaking household. Her mother, Kenna Campbell, is a Gaelic tradition-bearer and teacher, and is one of the Campbell musical dynasty from Greepe on the Isle of Skye, a renowned family of singers and pipers. Her father, Alasdair Kennedy (d. 2004) was from the island of Tiree.

Kennedy trained as a classical musician from the age of six, starting out on piano and later taking up the clàrsach (small Scottish harp) and concert harp. She trained with the Russian-trained Australian pianist, Elisabeth Jacobs, and with the Irish concert harpist Sanchia Pielou, who was a founding member of the BBC Scottish Symphony Orchestra. She went on to study as a pianist at the Royal Scottish Academy of Music and Drama in Glasgow, and undertook postgraduate research and training at the Royal Northern College of Music in Manchester with Welsh concert harpist Eira Lynn Jones. She completed her master's degree there in 1995, and was the first harpist in the college's history to be awarded its highest performance diploma. Her thesis was a study of Gaelic puirt a beul, or 'mouth music', a speciality of her mother's family.

She and her producer-musician husband Nick Turner live in Ardgour, Scottish Highlands.

== Presenting ==
From 1993 Kennedy lived and worked in Inverness as a news presenter and musician, latterly running the national Gaelic news service. She presented the long-running series Mary Ann Kennedy's Global Gathering (previously Celtic Connections) for BBC Radio Scotland until 2012, and until 2016 presented episodes of World on 3 on BBC Radio 3. Since 1994, she has co-presented Sruth na Maoile, a bilingual Irish-Scottish Gaelic music series with Seán Ó hÉanaigh for BBC Radio nan Gàidheal and RTÉ Ráidió na Gaeltachta – the only radio co-production between the two stations in those 23 years.

She presents Seirm on BBC Alba, introducing performances by traditional musicians. Series 12, broadcast in 2026, focused on that year’s Celtic Connections festival, for example episode 3 featured RURA, Arthur Cormack, J. P. Cormier, and ÉTÉ.

== Performance ==
Kennedy was a member of the highly acclaimed Gaelic band 'Cliar', winners of 'all-time' Best Album at the inaugural Scots Trad Music Awards. Her subsequent work has concentrated on a major book and album project, 'Fonn', showcasing the music and history of her mother's family, the Campbell singing dynasty and an album celebrating Glasgow's immigrant Gaelic song heritage, to be released in 2016. An album of Kennedy's original Gaelic songs and settings of 20th- and 21st-century poets was released early 2017. This was followed in 2019 by Glaschu: Hometown Love Song, a collection of Gaelic songs celebrating Glasgow, including poetry readings of works by notable Gaelic poets such as Derick Thompson by Bill Paterson and her sister Wilma Kennedy. Her latest longform work is the collaboration Talamh Beò, inspired by the region of Coigach and Assynt alongside regular collaborators Finlay Wells and her husband Nick Turner.

== Recording ==
Kennedy has produced records by, among others, James Graham, Donnie Murdo MacLeod, Ceòlraidh Ghàidhlig Ghlaschu, Ailie Robertson, Catriona Watt, Atomic Piseag, Shona Mooney, Bannal, Cliar, and Jenna Cumming. She runs the residential recording and creative facility, Watercolour Music Studios, with her husband Nick Turner from their base near Fort William in the West Highlands.

== Albums ==
- Mary Ann Kennedy & Na Seòid, 2008
- Strings Attached, with Charlotte Pederson, 2011
- An Dàn: Songs for a Modern World, 2017
- Glaschu: Home Town Love Song, 2019
