= Maeve Mackinnon =

- Origin: Glasgow, Scotland
- Genres: Celtic; Folk
- Occupation: Singer
- Label: Footstompin Records
- Website: maevemackinnon.com

Maeve Mackinnon is a Scottish folk singer. Originally from Glasgow, she performs primarily in Scottish Gaelic, and also in English. She is also one of two Gaelic singers who share the same name.

== Early life ==
Maeve Mackinnon grew up in the west end of Glasgow to a family of both Skye and Swedish heritage. Her father, Chairman of Scottish CND for over 30 years, took the family on regular demonstrations against Apartheid, nuclear weapons and in support of the miners strikes, and she credits these formative experiences as when she learned to both walk and sing. It was also as a toddler at political rallies that she first heard the Scots singer Dick Gaughan, who would become a major musical influence.

Mackinnon developed a deep interest in Gaelic language during regular childhood holidays to the Isle of Jura, where she met native speakers of Gaelic and took part in local ceilidhs where she was encouraged to sing.

Heavily influenced by Gaelic supergroup Capercaillie, Mackinnon began singing in Gaelic at school shows. On leaving school at 17 she started learning Gaelic formally at Clydebank College and subsequently majored in Gaelic song at the Royal Scottish Academy of Music and Drama (RSAMD.) During her studies at RSAMD she received tuition from well respected tradition-bearers and lecturers on a wide range of subjects, primarily with Gaelic song scholar Kenna Campbell and former course director and multi-instrumentalist Brian McNeill. Mackinnon graduated from the RSAMD with Honours in 2004.

== Nowadays ==
Mackinnon is recognised as one of Scotland's leading young folk musicians. She was nominated in 2008 as "Gaelic Singer of the Year" at the Scots Trad Music Awards and was named "Up and Coming Artist of the Year" at the 2007 Scots Trad Awards. She was also a finalist in BBC Radio Scotland's Young Traditional Musician competition in 2005.

In 2005 Mackinnon was awarded a year's scholarship to the Gaelic college Sabhal Mòr Ostaig on the Isle of Skye where she did further study in Gaelic. From 2006 to 2008 Mackinnon worked full-time in Gaelic medium education in East Dunbartonshire.

Her debut album "Don't Sing Lovesongs" was released in June 2007. The album was produced by bassist Duncan Lyall and multi-instrumentalist Ali Hutton and includes Scottish Gaelic songs as well as English songs from Ireland, Scotland and North America. The album's title is derived from the first line of the song "Silver Dagger", which was chosen due to the dark subject matter contained on the album.

Mackinnon has been broadcast on radio and television numerous times and has played in England, Ireland, Europe, North Africa and Western Canada. She has delved into theatre, touring with Scottish Opera's "1719" production and most recently National Theatre of Scotland's "Smiler", a piece on Glaswegian gang culture (2009). She was also involved in Donald Shaw's musical production "Argyll Rhapsody" (2007 and 2009).

In 2007, Mackinnon was commissioned to write a Christmas Carol for the "Òran Mór" venue. In 2008 she co-wrote and performed her first Gaelic song for the Gaelic TV series "A' Gharaids", together with "The Injuns", Findlay Napier and Mary Ann Kennedy. Recent work includes a Gaelic song specially written for a collaboration with the "Future Trad Collective" which is to be released on Vertical Records in 2010.

Mackinnon has appeared at major folk festivals such as Celtic Connections since 2004, but her biggest accolade to date was being included in Celtic Connections festival's "Classic Album" series in 2008, together with award-winning fiddler Lauren MacColl. They have since formed the trio "Mackinnon/MacColl/MacPherson" with multi-instrumentalist Ewan MacPherson. Mackinnon was the primary soloist at The Royal Edinburgh Military Tattoo 2015, singing in both Gaelic and English.

The singer is currently working in Glasgow as a full-time musician.

== Awards ==
- "Up and coming artist of the year" – Scots Trad Music Awards 2007
- Nominee for Gaelic Singer of the Year Scots Trad Music Awards 2008
- Finalist in the BBC Radio Scotland Young Traditional Musician award of 2005.

== Discography ==
- RSAMD: No.1 Scottish (2002). Greentrax Recording
- The TMSA Young Trad Tour 2005 (2006). TMSA
- Don't Sing Lovesongs (2007) Footstompin Records
- "Red Hot Chilli Pipers: Bagrock to the Masses" (2007)
- "Alan Reid & Rob Van Sante: The Rise and Fall O' Charlie" (2008)
- Once Upon an Olive Branch (2012). Maeve Mackinnon
- Strì (2018).
