= Kenna Campbell =

Scottish singer (born 1937)

Kenna Campbell MBE
- Ceana Chaimbeul
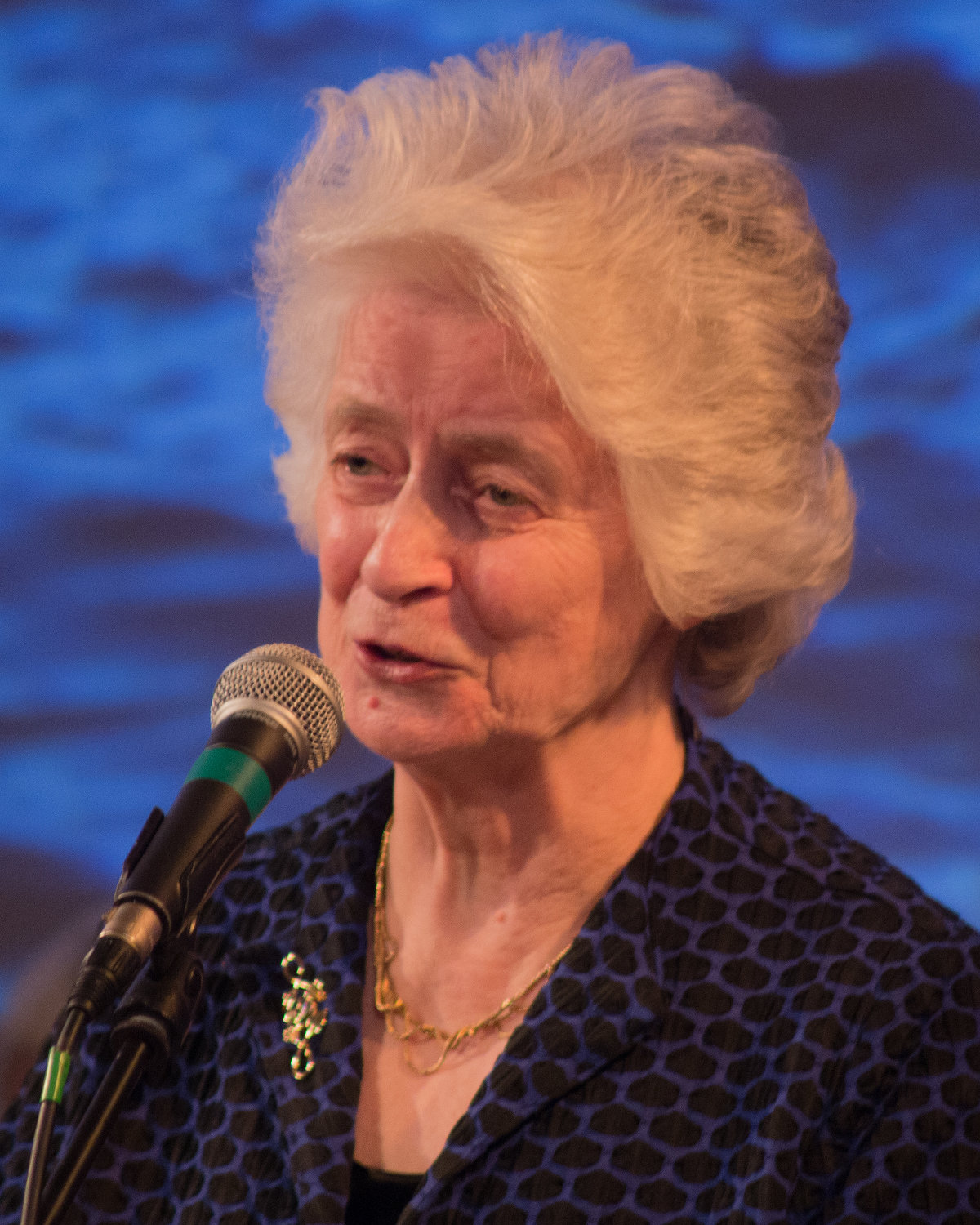
- Kenna Campbell at Sabhal Mòr Ostaig on 21 April 2016
- Born: 21 July 1937 (age 89); Greepe, Isle of Skye, Scotland
- Occupations: singer, teacher
- Spouse: Alasdair Kennedy (d. 2004)
- Children: 2 daughters (Mary Ann Kennedy, Wilma Kennedy)
- Honours: Honorary Fellow Sabhal Mòr Ostaig (2009) Honorary Doctorate (D Acad) Royal Conservatoire of Scotland (2009) MBE (2017)
- Musical career
- Genres: puirt à beul, òran mór
- Instrument: Vocals
- Label: Greentrax Recordings
- Formerly of: Bannal

Kenna Campbell MBE (Scottish Gaelic: Ceana Chaimbeul) (born 21 July 1937) is a Scottish singer, teacher, tradition bearer and advocate for Gaelic language, culture and song.

== Biography ==
Campbell was born on 21 July 1937 at Greepe, near Roag on the Isle of Skye, into a Crofting family known for their singing and pipe playing. As a child she regularly sang at ceilidhs, and once sang for Dame Flora MacLeod, Chieftain of the MacLeod clan, at Dunvegan Castle.

She left Skye for Glasgow, to study for a diploma in primary school teaching at Jordanhill College, and later in her career became Head Teacher at the special needs Newhills School in Easterhouse.

While pursuing her career and bringing up her family she continued to sing. Her favoured styles are puirt à beul (mouth music) and òran mór (the Great song). She sang with her sister Mary, and appeared on BBC Scotland and on the Scottish Television show Jigtime. Together with her sister Ann, brother Seumas and guitarist Ian Young she formed a group called Na h-Eilthirich (The Exiles). Na h-Eilthirich toured Scotland and Europe, broadcast regularly, and recorded an album.

In 1981 she, with several others, established the Barra Fèis a festival of Gaelic music and song. This was in response to parents' and others concern that Gaelic music and tradition was neither being taught to young people in a formal context, nor being particularly celebrated. So successful were the Barra Fèisean that many other communities have since established similar local events.

In the 1990s Campbell formed Bannal, a Glasgow-based group of eight women, including her daughter Wilma Kennedy, who sang traditional Gaelic waulking songs. In 1996 the group released a CD on Greentrax Recordings titled Waulking Songs. In 2006 they made another release titled Bho Dòrn gu Dòrn. One side of the disc, in CD format, features recordings of more waulking songs, and on the other side, in DVD format, there is a 30-minute documentary on the tradition of waulking songs.

On 20 May 1994 Kenna sang the 23rd psalm in Gaelic at the funeral service of Labour Party leader John Smith. She would later reprise the performance for the 2003 TV film The Deal.

Campbell was the principal tutor in Gaelic and Scottish song at the Royal Conservatoire of Scotland, and in 2009 received an honorary degree.

Campbell was married to Alasdair Kennedy (d. 2004), a design engineer, and together they had two daughters, Mary Ann Kennedy and Wilma Kennedy, both of whom are involved in music.

Campbell was an early trustee of Sabhal Mòr Ostaig, and in 2009 received an Honorary Fellowship from the college in recognition of the important role she played in promoting the Gaelic language, and in the development of Gaelic education in Scotland.

In June 2017 Campbell received an Order of the British Empire in the Queen's Birthday Honours List for services to the promotion of the Gaelic language, music and Gaelic medium education.
