= Findlay Napier =

British singer

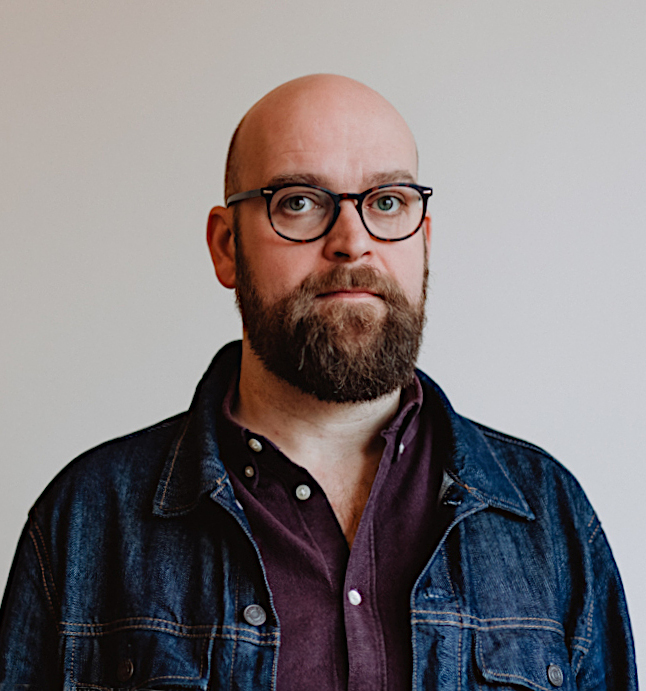

Background information
- Born: Glasgow, Scotland
- Origin: Grantown-on-Spey, Highland, Scotland
- Genres: Singer-songwriter, folk, roots, Indie, Traditional Scottish
- Occupations: Musician, songwriter, compère, musical director
- Instruments: Vocals, guitar
- Years active: 1996–present
- Website: findlaynapier.com

Findlay Napier (born November 1978) is a Scottish singer-songwriter and music teacher. He was a member of Scottish folk group Back of the Moon and runs music writing courses.

== Biography ==
Napier was born in Glasgow, Scotland, in November 1978 and grew up in Grantown on Spey. In 1996 he moved to Glasgow to join the BA (Scottish Music) course at the RSAMD (now the Royal Conservatoire of Scotland). He graduated from the RSAMD in 1999 playing with a series of Scottish traditional music bands in Glasgow. In 2000 he had been working as Margaret Bennett's accompanist and had toured with her in Scotland and France. After working on "In the Sunny Long Ago" with producer Martyn Bennett he was invited by Gillian Frame, Hamish Napier and Simon McKerrell to join Back of the Moon. That year Back of the Moon recorded their debut album "Gillian Frame and Back of the Moon". Back of the Moon toured from 2000 till 2007 releasing three albums and finishing with a final gig in the Kennedy Center in Washington, D.C., on 21 November 2007.

Napier was approached by producer and engineer Nick Turner to begin a songwriting project which they later named "Queen Anne's Revenge". They began writing on the evening of 14 December 2003 and had written four songs by the next morning including "Ship in a Bottle" and "Out All Night".

Before the demise of Back of the Moon, Napier began working on a project called Findlay Napier and the Bar Room Mountaineers. As the project developed it moved further from traditional material towards a contemporary Indie Folk sound.

With help from Creative Scotland and Hands Up for Trad Napier began a mentoring project with singer songwriter Boo Hewerdine. The pair ended up writing seventeen new songs and recording and releasing an album called VIP: Very Interesting Persons in 2015, which reached number 2 on the Daily Telegraph's top folk albums. Each song on VIP is about a real life character who has led an interesting life. Hewerdine produced Napier's second solo album "Glasgow" a collection of covers and original songs about the city.

Naier met and co-wrote with Megan Henwood and Rebecca Loebe. These collaborations led to Loebe and Napier's 2018 EP and tour "Filthy Jokes" and Henwood and Napier's 2019 Story Song Scientist EP and tour.

Napier has hosted the 'Late Night Session' at Celtic Connections from 2011 until 2022 and was the creator and musical director of Hazy Recollections a mini festival within a festival that celebrates and connects acts whose music meets at the boundaries of the indie, folk and roots scenes.

Napier has run many songwriting retreats with Boo Hewerdine. He has also run songwriting courses with Karine Polwart, Reg Meuross, Lorraine Lucas, katie Melua, Pete Astor,Bella Hardyand many more. He was the director of Glasgow Songwriting Festival.

He is married to Gillian Frame. He worked for many years as a lecturer on traditional music at the Royal Conservatoire of Scotland. He has lived and worked on the Isle of Arran since 2022 while touring the UK and further afield.

== Awards and nominations ==
Winner - Composer of the Year - Scots Trad Music Awards 2005 Nominated- Musician of the Year - Scots Trad Music Awards 2021 Nominated- Live Act of the Year - Scots Trad Music Awards 2018 Nominated - Composer of the Year (with Nick Turner Watercolour Music - Scots Trad Music Awards 2010 Winner- Folk Band of the Year (with Back of the Moon- Scots Trad Music Awards 2005 Winner- Best Up and Coming Band (with Back of the Moon- Scots Trad Music Awards 2003

== Discography ==
=== Findlay Napier ===
- "Outsider" – The Bothy Society – 2025
- "It Is What It Is" – The Bothy Society – 2021
- "Glasgow" – Cheerygroove CHEERY006 – October 2017
- "Very Interesting Extras EP" – Cheerygroove CHEERY004
- "VIP: Very Interesting Persons" – Cheerygroove CHEERY002 – January 2015

=== The Magpie Arc ===
- "Gil Brenton" – Collective Perspective – 2025
- "Glamour in the Grey" – Collective Perspective – 2022

=== Megan Henwood and Findlay Napier ===
- "Quantum Lyrics" – Dharma Records DHARMACD44 – November 2021
- "Story Song Scientists EP" – Dharma Records DHARMACD33 – March 2019

=== Loebe and Napier ===
- "Filthy Jokes EP" – Cheerygroove Records, 12 February 2018

=== Chris Sherburn and Findlay Napier ===
- "Two Men on a Boat" – Cheerygroove CHEERY001 – March 2015

=== Findlay Napier and the Bar Room Mountaineers ===
- "File Under Fiction" – Watercolour Music – May 2011
- Valentine's Day (Single) – Watercolour Music February 2011
- Raise a Glass (Single) – Watercolour Music February 2010
- When Harry Met Charlie (EP) – BRM/Karmic/Watercolour – 2009
- "Out All Night" – BRM/Karmic – 2008

=== Queen Anne's Revenge ===
- "Just One Umbrella?" – Watercolour Music – 2008
- "Queen Anne's Revenge" – Watercolour Music – 2005

=== Back of the Moon ===
- "Luminosity" – Footstompin Records – 2005
- " Fortune's Road" – Footstompin Records – 2003
- "Gillian Frame and Back of the Moon" – Footstompin Records – 2001

=== Margaret Bennett ===
- "In the Sunny Long Ago" – Footstompin 2001

=== As a session musician ===
- "Orain Do Mhullie"/"A Song for Mull" – Arrangements, Guitar and Backing Vocals
- "Beside the Waves of Time" – Iona Leigh Arrangements, Guitar and Backing Vocals
- "No. 1 Scottish" – RSAMD – Lead Vocal, Guitar
- "Thall an Loch Aillse" – Mairi Sine Campbell- Arrangements, Guitar and Backing Vocals
- "Glasgow Skyline" – Gillian Frame and Padraig O Neill – Guitar and Backing Vocals
- "Finlay MacDonald" – Finlay MacDonald – Vocals

=== As producer ===
- co-producer (with Phil Cunningham) "Scottish Music at the RSAMD" – The Future of Our Past" Greentrax Records 2010
- co-producer (with Back of the Moon) "Luminosity" – Footstompin Records – 2005
- producer "Elaine Lennon" – Elaine Lennon – Little Sailor – 2019
- co-producer (with Anna Massie) – "The Joy of It" – Feis Phaslig Ceilidh Trail 2021 – Feis Phaslig – 2021

== TV work ==
- Katie Morag (TV series) Struay Pictures 2014 – Actor, Sven, Katie Morag's Uncle
- "Fonn Fonn Fonn" Moja TV 2014 – Musician, Straight Guy
- "Garaids" BBC Alba 2008 – Performer, Assistant Musical Director
- "Around Scotland" BBC Education 2007 – Musical Director, presenter
- "Scotlands Music with Phil Cunningham" BBC Scotland 2007 – Performer
- "" MnE- 2007 – Arrangements, Guitar, Backing Vocals
