= Hamish Moore =

Scottish musician and bagpipe maker

Hamish Moore is a Scottish musician and bagpipe maker. Among Moore's contributions to Scottish music are his development of a revived form of the bellows-blown Scottish smallpipes; his 1985 recording of the Lowland and smallpipes, Cauld Wind Pipes, was the first contemporary complete recording of this instrument. In the 1980s and 1990s, Moore was also instrumental in exploring the links between the Scottish diaspora music of Canada's Cape Breton Island, and earlier Scottish traditions. Moore taught at Cape Breton's Gaelic College of Celtic Arts and Crafts, and in 1996 returned to South Uist, Scotland, to form his Ceolas musical summer school, which included Cape Breton instructors and influences.

Hamish is father of Fin Moore, also a Scottish smallpiper and border piper.
