= Back of the Moon =

Scottish musical group

Back of the Moon was a Scottish musical group from the Isle of Arran which played both new and Scottish traditional tunes and songs cast in modern sounding arrangements. After forming in 2000, the band toured annually throughout the UK, Canada, United States and a number of European countries. Back of the Moon created an acoustic sound through a front line of Scottish border pipes and fiddle, a pairing of low whistle and flute, and their guitar/piano rhythm combo. They were at times augmented by bodhran and Cape Breton Stepdancing, and three-part vocal harmonies in their Scottish songs in which each singer took the lead.

They formed in 2000 under the name Gillian Frame & Back of the Moon, with Findlay Napier joining in 2001, and signed with Foot Stompin'Records. They released their first album, Gillian Frame and Back of the Moon in 2001, after Frame won the BBC Radio Scotland Young Traditional Musician award the year before. They changed their name in 2003 to simply Back of the Moon, after releasing their second album. In 2003, they won "Best Up and Coming Act" at the Scots Trad Music Awards and "Best Celtic Group" at Festival Interceltique de Lorient. In 2005, they won "Best Folk Band" at the Scots Trad Music Awards.

They disbanded after a final tour in the US at the Kennedy Center, Washington DC, in November 2007.

== Discography ==
1. Gillian Frame and Back of the Moon (2001)
2. Fortune's Road (2003)
3. Luminosity (2005)

== Band members ==
=== 2000–2003 ===
- Gillian Frame (fiddle, vocals)
- Simon McKerrell (border pipes, uilleann pipes, whistles, vocals)
- Hamish Napier (piano, whistles, vocals)
- Findlay Napier (guitar, vocals) (joined early 2001)

=== 2003–2007 ===
- Findlay Napier (guitar, vocals)
- Gillian Frame (fiddle, vocals)
- Ali Hutton (border pipes, whistles, bodhran)
- Hamish Napier (piano, whistles, flutes, vocals)
