= Tobar an Dualchais – Kist o Riches =

Tobar an Dualchais – Kist o Riches (Scottish Gaelic pronunciation: [ˈt̪opəɾ ən̪ˠ ˈt̪uəl̪ˠxɪʃ]) is a project which aims to preserve and digitize material gathered in Scottish Gaelic, Scots and English by the School of Scottish Studies (of the University of Edinburgh), BBC Scotland and the Canna Collection of the National Trust for Scotland.

Much of the material consists of recordings of folklore, songs and music, local history and other data gathered from the 1930s onwards.
