= Robyn Stapleton =

- Origin: Stranraer, Dumfries and Galloway, Scotland
- Genres: Folk music
- Occupation: Musician
- Instrument: Vocals
- Website: www.robynstapleton.net

Robyn Stapleton is a Scottish singer who performs traditional songs in English, Scots, and Gaelic. She studied music at the Royal Conservatoire of Scotland and the University of Limerick in Ireland. In 2014, Robyn won the BBC Radio Scotland Young Traditional Musician award and was nominated for Scots Singer of the Year at that year's Scots Trad Music Awards.

== Discography ==
- Fickle Fortune (1 June 2015)
- The Songs of Robert Burns (20 January 2017)
