= Angus Peter Campbell =

Scottish poet, novelist, journalist, broadcaster and actor

Angus Peter Campbell (Scottish Gaelic: Aonghas P(h)àdraig Caimbeul; born 1954) is a Scottish award-winning poet, novelist, journalist, broadcaster and actor.

Campbell's works, which are written mainly in Scottish Gaelic, draw heavily upon both Hebridean mythology and folklore and the magic realism of recent Latin American literature. In an interview prior to his death, Sorley MacLean called Campbell one of the best living Scottish poets in any language.

== Early life and education ==
Angus Peter Campbell was born on 29 April 1954 in South Lochboisdale, South Uist. His father, Ewan Campbell (Scottish Gaelic: Eòghainn Mòr Aonghais Nìll Aonghais Iain Mhòr), was from Ludag. His mother, Christina MacDonald (Scottish Gaelic: Ciorstaidh Eòghainn Mhòr 'ic Dhòmhnaill 'ic Aonghais 'ic Alastair), was from Garrynamonie. His paternal uncle, Neil Campbell (Scottish Gaelic: Niall Mòr), was a long-serving ferryman between Ludag, Eriskay, and Barra.

In a 2009 interview, Campbell recalled, "My first exposure to ‘Gaelic literature’ may very well have been the birds (the curlews) singing outside our house on the moor, or the sound of the cart taking the peats home, or of our neighbour Eairdsidh Beag playing the bagpipes, or of someone singing in the village. I went to primary school in South Uist where ‘official literature’ if you want to put it that way, was hidden between the cover of books and therefore in English. ‘Literature’ was Black Beauty and Kidnapped and Treasure Island."

After attending Garrynamonie primary school until the age of twelve, Campbell spent his teenage years in Oban, where he was taught by Iain Crichton Smith at Oban High School. Campbell remains grateful to Smith for having exposed him to international literature at a time and place where such instruction was unusual; William Shakespeare's Hamlet one day, Duncan Ban MacIntyre the next. One iconic book of Gaelic poetry that Smith also used in teaching his pupils was William J. Watson's edition of the 16th-century Book of the Dean of Lismore, Campbell later recalled, however, "But as far as I could work out none of the poets in it was still alive. No doubt this set me subconsciously thinking that poetry belonged to the dead."

According to Campbell, "Iain was an absolute joy as a teacher – challenging, inspirational and funny. I was in his English class from age 12 to 17, and during that period he opened windows to world literature. One day he would bring in an LP of Beethoven and play it then ask us to write a poem in response; the next he might read us the Gospel of Matthew, Chapter 6 – 'Consider the lilies of the field, how they grow: they neither toil nor spin; and yet I say to you that even Solomon in all his glory was not arrayed like one of these' – just for the joy of the words (I can still hear him reading these words); the next day again he would introduce us to Lowell, or Ginsberg, or Arthur Miller. I think I learned two things from him – that poets were alive, and that we could stand at ease next to the great internationalists."

Campbell then attended the University of Edinburgh, where he obtained an honours degree in history and politics, and was mentored by internationally renowned Gaelic poet Sorley MacLean, who was writer-in-residence in Edinburgh at the time.

Campbell recalls, "I went to see him with some poems of mine and he was tremendously encouraging and supportive, and remained so throughout his life. I think Sorley just verified what Iain had seeded: that poetry was a great international language and that Gaelic could proudly stand alongside Spanish or Greek or Russian or English or whatever in that great discourse."

== Career ==
=== Literary career ===
After graduation, Campbell worked in the media. In 2001, he was awarded the Bardic Crown for Gaelic poetry at the Mòd and also received a Creative Scotland Award. The following year, he was given a Creative Scotland Award for Literature.

His novel, An Oidhche Mus do Sheòl Sinn, published by CLÀR, was voted by the public into the Top Ten of the 100 Best-Ever Books from Scotland in the Orange/List Awards. Sorley MacLean said of Campbell:

“I have no doubts that Angus Peter Campbell is one of the few really significant living poets in Scotland, writing in any language.” — Sorley MacLean (West Highland Free Press, October 1992)

His first English-language work of fiction, Invisible Islands (ISBN 0-9552283-0-1), was published in 2006. It was inspired by Italo Calvino, Gabriel García Márquez, and Jorge Luis Borges. The book consists of twenty-one chapters, each illuminating a specific island in the mythic Invisible Islands archipelago. The work draws heavily on Hebridean mythology and folklore and Scottish history, magic realism and a number of other influences. He also wrote a short English-language novel, Archie and the North Wind (Luath Press; 2010).

His latest work is a collection of poetry, Aibisidh, published by Polygon (Edinburgh) in 2011. It won the 2012 Scottish Mortgage Investment Trust Book Award in the poetry category.

Campbell writes frequently about the Catholic Church in his work. In a 2009 interview, Campbell described himself as a Christian socialist.

=== Acting career ===
In 2006, Campbell starred in the Scottish Gaelic fantasy drama feature film Seachd: The Inaccessible Pinnacle.

== Personal life ==
Campbell lives on the Isle of Skye with his wife and six children, and is now a full-time writer, journalist, broadcaster, actor. He is the father of piper Brìghde Chaimbeul.

== See also ==
- List of novelists
- List of poets
- List of Scottish writers
- List of University of Edinburgh people
