= Bruce MacGregor (musician) =

Scottish fiddler and broadcaster

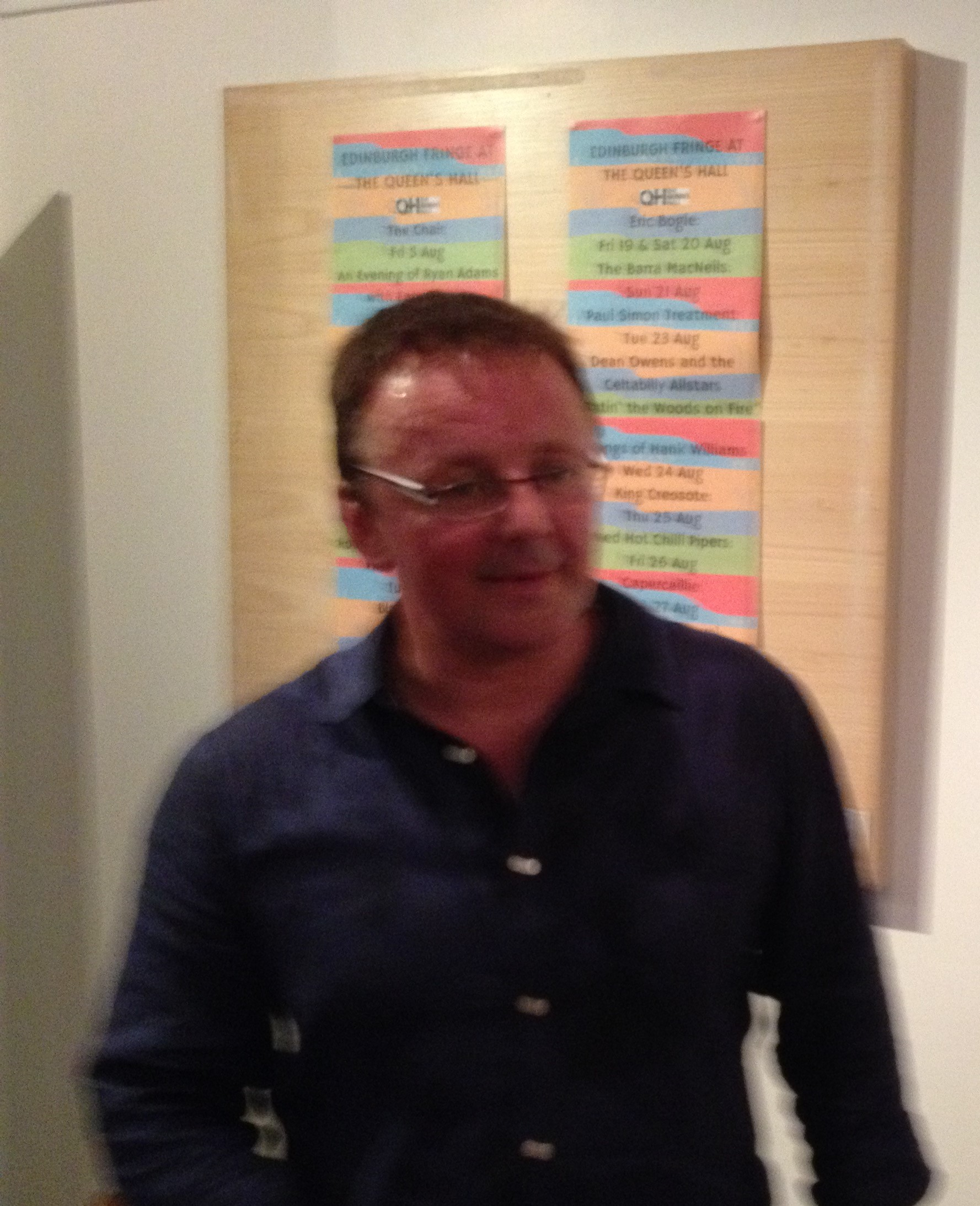

Bruce MacGregor is a Scottish fiddler and broadcaster who founded Blazin' Fiddles in 1998.

Bruce MacGregor was born in Inverness in 1970. MacGregor is the current director for Bogbain Farm and a director of MacGregor's Bar in Inverness. He is also a co-director of the 'Spirit of the North' festival.

MacGregor was a pupil of Donald Riddell CBE, who also taught fellow fiddlers Highland Duncan Chisholm and Iain MacFarlane, who both joined MacGregor in the first Blazin' Fiddles line-up.

== Biography ==
Educated at Inverness Royal Academy, MacGregor studied history at Edinburgh University followed by a post-graduate Business Diploma in Business Administration from Napier University

MacGregor started working at BBC Radio Scotland in 1994 as a researcher before becoming a producer and presenter. He produced and presented The Strathspey King in 2000 and The Captain's Collection 1999; both shows won Golden Torque awards at the International Celtic Media Awards.

The Strathspey King was toured as a play produced by Dogstar Theatre.

“…a colourful roller coaster of huge successes and dramatic failures…Billy Riddoch brought the character alive in a vibrant and sympathetic fashion, fuelled by Hamish MacDonald’s sensitive and often very funny script……Scott Skinner’s music was also in good hands. Fiddler Bruce MacGregor and cellist Christine Hanson performed his tunes live throughout, and were worth the admission money on their own…This was a piece of imaginative and beautifully realised music theatre honouring a flawed genius of Scottish music".

MacGregor played amateur rugby, captaining Inverness-based Highland Rugby Club]

MacGregor was also captain of Edinburgh University Rugby Club, winning the Scottish Universities Cup in 1992, touring Zimbabwe in 1990 and South America in 1992. MacGregor also represented Scottish Universities (1991 &92) and Scottish students (1991)

Bruce is married to Jo de Sylva co-director and Chairman of Visit Inverness Loch Ness

== Albums ==
- Blazin Fiddles – Fire on! (2000)
- Blazin Fiddles – The Old Style (2004)
- Blazin Fiddles – Magnificent Seven (2005)
- Blazin Fiddles – Live (2007)
- Blazin Fiddles – Thursday Night at the Caley (2011)
- Blazin Fiddles – Six (2014)
- Blazin Fiddles – Solo (2014)
- Blazin Fiddles – North (2015)
- Cliar – Cliar
- Cliar Gun Tamh
- Cliar Laiser Dhe
- Bruce MacGregor – 101 Reasons to do nothing
- Bruce MacGregor – Loch Ness
- Bruce MacGregor & Christine Hanson – Kissin is the best of 'A
- Bruce MacGregor, Duncan Chisholm & Iain MacFarlane – Portrait of a Highland Fiddler
