= Treacherous Orchestra =

Scottish Celtic fusion band

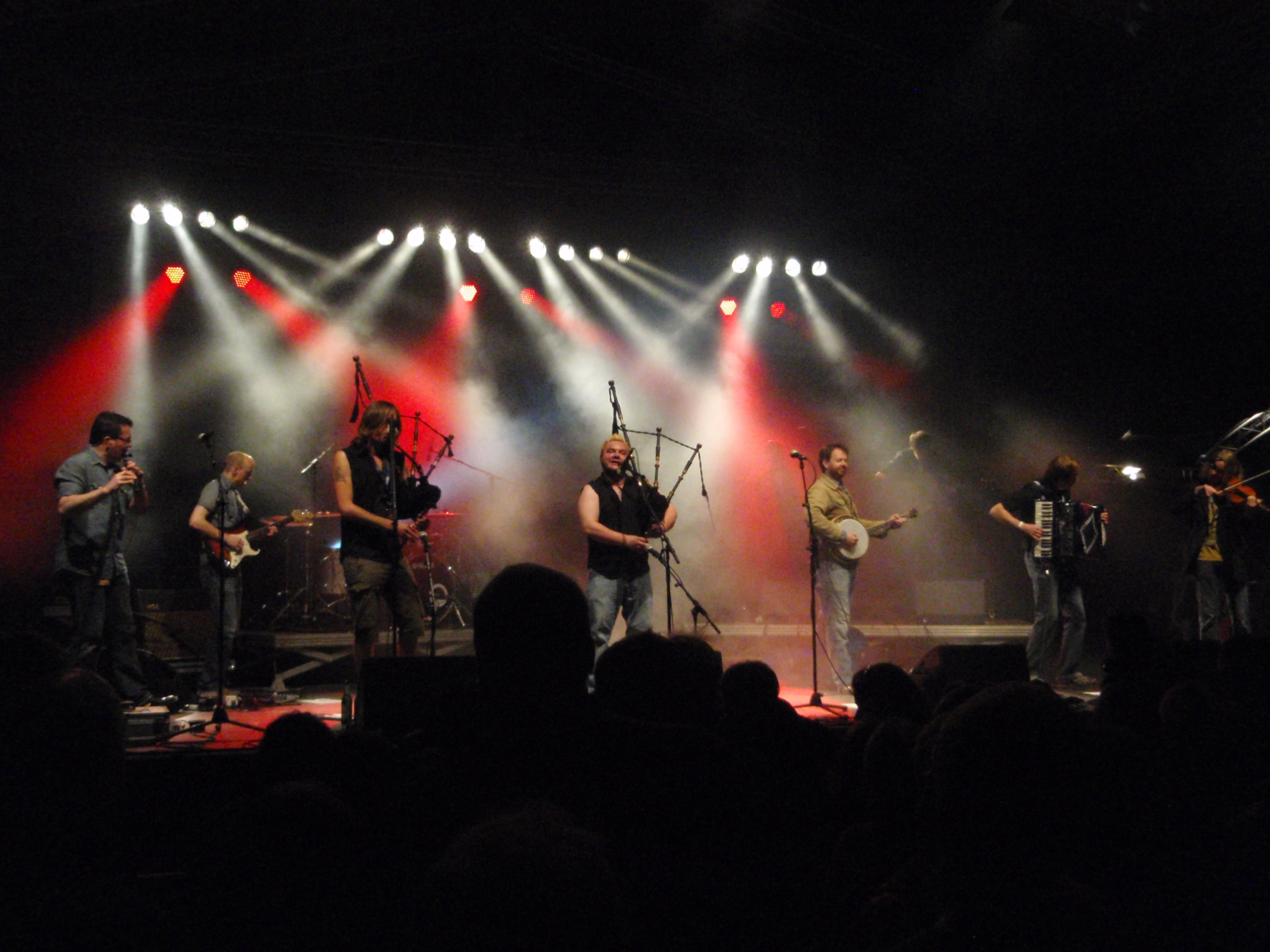

Background information
- Origin: Glasgow, Scotland
- Genres: Celtic fusion, folk rock
- Years active: 2009–present
- Labels: Reveal Records, Navigator Records
- Members: Innes Watson; Adam Sutherland; Fraser Stone; John Somerville; Barry Reid; Martin O'Neill; Kevin O'Neill; Duncan Lyall; Ali Hutton; Éamonn Coyne; Ross Ainslie
- Website: https://treacherousorchestra.co.uk

Treacherous Orchestra are a Scottish 12-piece Celtic fusion band. The band blends Scottish traditional music with other influences such as folk, rock and punk. Instruments used include bagpipes, accordion, banjo, bodhrán, fiddle and tin whistle as well as guitars, bass and drums. The Guardian described them as "a Scottish folk big band, celebrated for their furious live performances and impressive musicianship". They first played together at Celtic Connections in 2009, and were nominated for the Scottish Album of the Year awards in 2015.

== Albums ==
The band have released two full-length albums.

- Origins (2012)
- Grind (2015)
