= Shona Mooney =

Scottish fiddle player and composer

Shona Mooney (born c. 1984) is a Scottish fiddle player and composer.

== Career ==
Shona Mooney was the winner of the BBC Radio Scotland Young Traditional Musician competition in 2006. She has appeared at international festivals such as the Tønder Festival (Denmark), and toured with the Scottish Folk orchestra The Unusual Suspects. To date, she has recorded two albums, Heartsease and Sensing the Park.

Heartsease (viola tricolour) was released on Footstompin' Records in 2006. It combines the traditional Borders style with components of a contemporary style. It was chosen to be "Top of the World" (editor's choice) in Songlines magazine and has received 5-star reviews in The Herald and multiple broadcasts on BBC's Late Junction.

Shona began playing in O'er the Border with her parents Barbara and Gordon Mooney, bowing a small fiddle bought for her in a junk shop in Peebles. During her childhood, moving between Newstead, Newtown, Westruther, Maxton, Eildon and Lauder in the Borders, she studied classical violin. She also studied traditional fiddle styles with violinist Lucy Cowan before joining the musical scene at Kelso High School.

In 2001, aged 17, Shona started Newcastle University's newly founded degree course in Folk and Traditional Music where she continued researching music of the Scottish Borders, stemming from her father's contribution to the world of Borders piping. Along the way she had tuition from fiddlers – Catriona MacDonald, Chris Wood and Aidan O'Rourke – who supported her to blend the style of the Borders fiddle with more contemporary influences.

She graduated with first-class honours and began recording albums with her friends, including Crosscurrent's Momentum and Border Young Fiddle's self-titled debut. She later continued to perform and teach at major events including Cambridge, Warwick, Dranouter folk festivals and Huddersfield Contemporary Music Festival. She also performed alongside Capercaillie's Donald Shaw and Karen Matheson at BBC Proms in the Park and appeared on Howard Goodall's How Music Works for Channel 4.
