= Scottish smallpipes =

Type of bellows-blown bagpipe

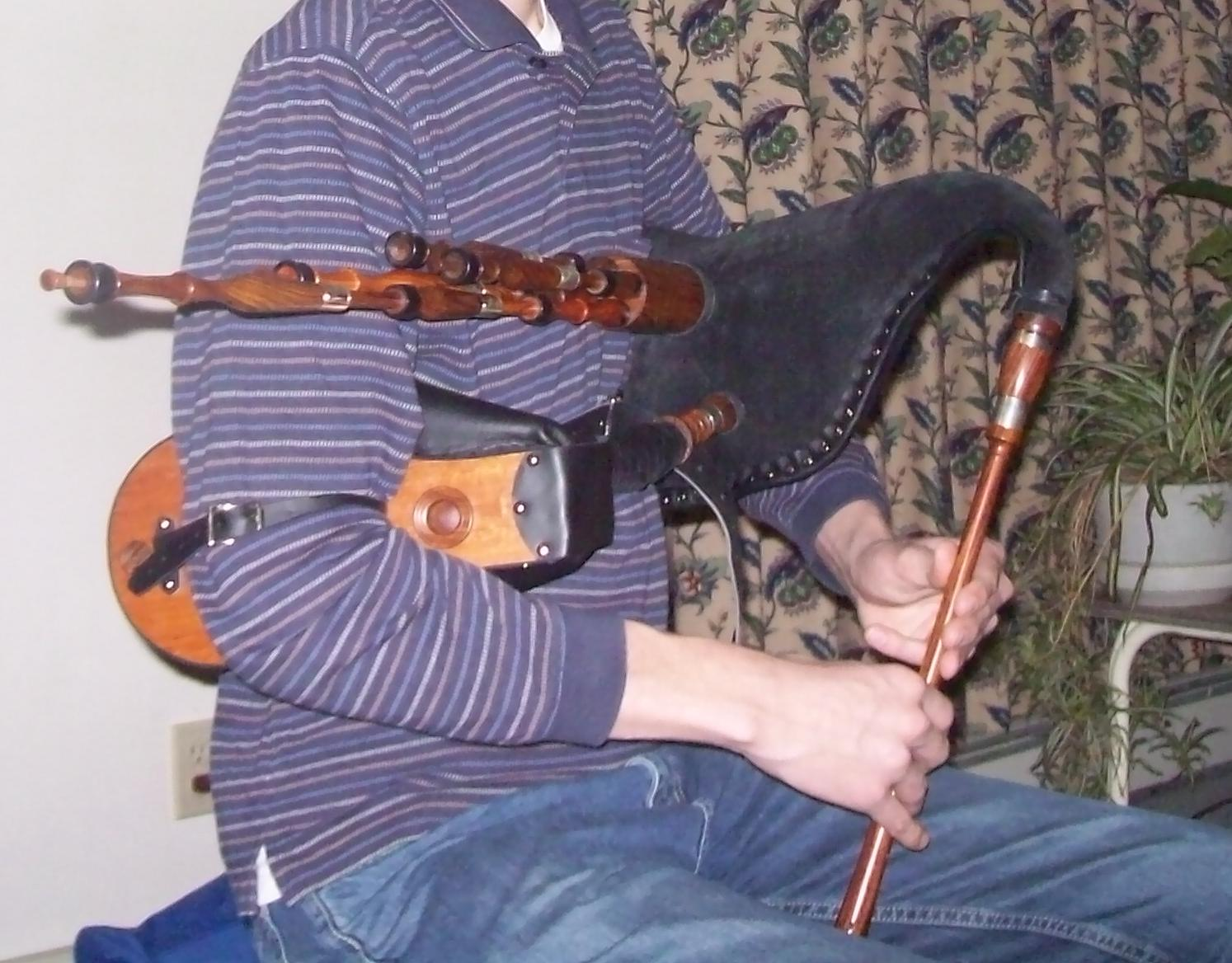
A set of cocobolo Scottish smallpipes with horn mountings, made in 2008 by Ebert Jones

The Scottish smallpipe is a bellows-blown bagpipe re-developed by Colin Ross and many others, adapted from an earlier design of the instrument. There are surviving bellows-blown examples of similar historical instruments as well as the mouth-blown Montgomery smallpipes, dated 1757, which are held in the National Museum of Scotland. Some instruments are being built as direct copies of historical examples, but few modern instruments are directly modelled on older examples; the modern instrument is typically larger and lower-pitched. The innovations leading to the modern instrument, in particular the design of the reeds, were largely taken from the Northumbrian smallpipes.

Although there is evidence of small pipes dating back to 15th century, in its current form it is perhaps the youngest bagpipe with widespread popularity, having only existed in this form since the early 1980s.

== Characteristics ==
Scottish smallpipes are distinguished from the Northumbrian smallpipes by the open ended chanter, and usually by the lack of keys. This means that the sound of the chanter is continuous, rather than staccato, and that its range is only nine notes, rather than the octave and a sixth range of the later 18th/early 19th century Northumbrian pipes.

The instrument has a cylindrically bored chanter, most commonly pitched in A; pipes in D, C, B flat, and G are also common. Being cylindrically bored, the chanter sounds an octave lower than a conical-bored chanter of the same size, such as that of the Border pipes.The basic scale of the Scottish smallpipe is identical to the Mixolydian scale of the Highland and Border bagpipes: the 7th (leading) note on the scale is flattened, meaning in the case of an A chanter, the low and high G notes are natural, rather than sharp (as they would be in the scale of A major.)

Scottish smallpipes are most commonly tuned to be played with the same fingering system as Highland bagpipes (sometimes called 'half-covered'), however they can also be tuned to accept a 'covered' fingering system (very similar to that of the 'closed' system used for Northumbrian smallpipes), where only one finger is lifted from the chanter to play each note, the only difference to the Northumbrian system being that the tonic tonehole on the chanter is left uncovered (except when playing the low leading note.)

Scottish smallpipes are normally bellows-blown like the Northumbrian smallpipes and Border pipes. The advantages of bellows-blown pipes, such as greater stability of tuning (due to smaller fluctuations in humidity and temperature of air across the reeds) and the possibility to sing or talk whilst playing make them by far the most popular variation, however mouth-blown smallpipes are fairly common.

The chanter is most commonly unkeyed, but occasionally keys are added, most often high B, G sharp, F natural, and C natural, to extend the range and/or give access to accidental notes. A second thumb hole may be added to the back of the chanter to play C natural. Though it would in principle be possible to add as many keys as seen on modern Northumbrian smallpipes, very few sets with more than 3 keys exist. Most music written for the instrument uses only the nine notes of its unkeyed range.

The drones, typically three in number, are set in a common stock and are usually tuned in one of two patterns. For pipes in A, the tenor drone is tuned to the low "A" of the chanter (the tonic), and the bass drone to the "A" an octave below this. There is often also a dominant drone - this can be either a baritone, tuned a fifth above the bass, or an alto drone, tuned a fifth above the tenor. For tunes played on the 4th (i.e. in D on an A chanter), the dominant drone can be either shut off or retuned to the fourth on the chanter. Most makers favour a baritone drone, rather than an alto, though some use only the bass and tenor. Some makers have developed drones compatible with both A and D chanters, so that one instrument can be used with either chanter. One example is the "ADAD" style, with bass, baritone, tenor, and alto, as seen here: With longer tuning slides or the addition of tuning beads (used widely on Northumbrian smallpipe drones), drones can easily be retuned to a pitch one or two tones higher. This allows for increased drone tuning options, meaning tunes can be played in the nominal keys of A Mixolydian, D major, B minor and by tuning down by a tone, in G. The use of longer tuning slides is also used to convert A and D drones to G and C drones (or vice versa), meaning the same set of drones can be played with chanters in D, C, A and G.

== History ==
Originally one of the first documented bagpipes in Scotland, along with the Border pipes, smallpipes were popular in the Lowland areas of Scotland as far north as Aberdeen. Evidence shows them to have existed since the 15th century (Highland pipes can only be documented from the 15th century in a form definably separate from Irish "warpipes"), when they were used for dancing and entertainment in court and castle, later they became popular amongst burgh pipers, and town minstrels until the early 19th Century, when the demise of the town pipers led to their disappearing from the record. Being bellows-blown this made them suitable for playing for long periods. Bellows-blown smallpipes are believed to have entered Scotland via England, and the continent of Europe, examples are preserved in many drawings, carvings, and paintings from 15th century onwards, and in Europe from the 12th century onwards. There is some discussion of the historical Scottish smallpipes in Collinson's history of the bagpipes. More reliable research and information can be obtained in Hugh Cheape's "Bagpipes: A National Collection."

Since there was a break in the continuous playing tradition of the smallpipes, and Border pipes, no absolute, definitive playing style can be ascribed to them. However, according to the evidence provided by surviving manuscript collections of music written for these pipes (particular those of Dixon, Peacock, and Riddell), their style was built around variations, runs, and arpeggios, as opposed to the surviving Highland music which is dominated by stylised gracenote techniques.

Smallpipes are extremely popular with Highland pipers, many of whom use them, or a set of Border pipes, as a second instrument better suited to indoor playing, and play them according to the Highland tradition. Though it has somewhat supplanted the musically unsatisfactory Highland practice chanter as a relatively quiet rehearsal instrument for Highland pipers, it has gained wide currency as a session instrument, playing both the Highland and lowland (border) repertoires.

The Scottish smallpipes were the first widely available instrument which allowed Highland pipers to participate in musical sessions with fiddlers, flautists and other instruments, as well as to accompany singers. Leading players include Hamish Moore, Iain MacInnes, Allan MacDonald, Gary West, Fred Morrison, Fin Moore, Brìghde Chaimbeul, Michael Roddy, Callum Armstrong, Ross Ainslie, Gordon Mooney, EJ Jones, Ailis Sutherland, Glenn Coolen, Barry Shears, as well as the late Martyn Bennett.

== See also ==
- Bagpipe

LBPS list of smallpipe and border pipe makers

- List of Smallpipe makers
