= Rachel Newton =

Scottish harpist and singer

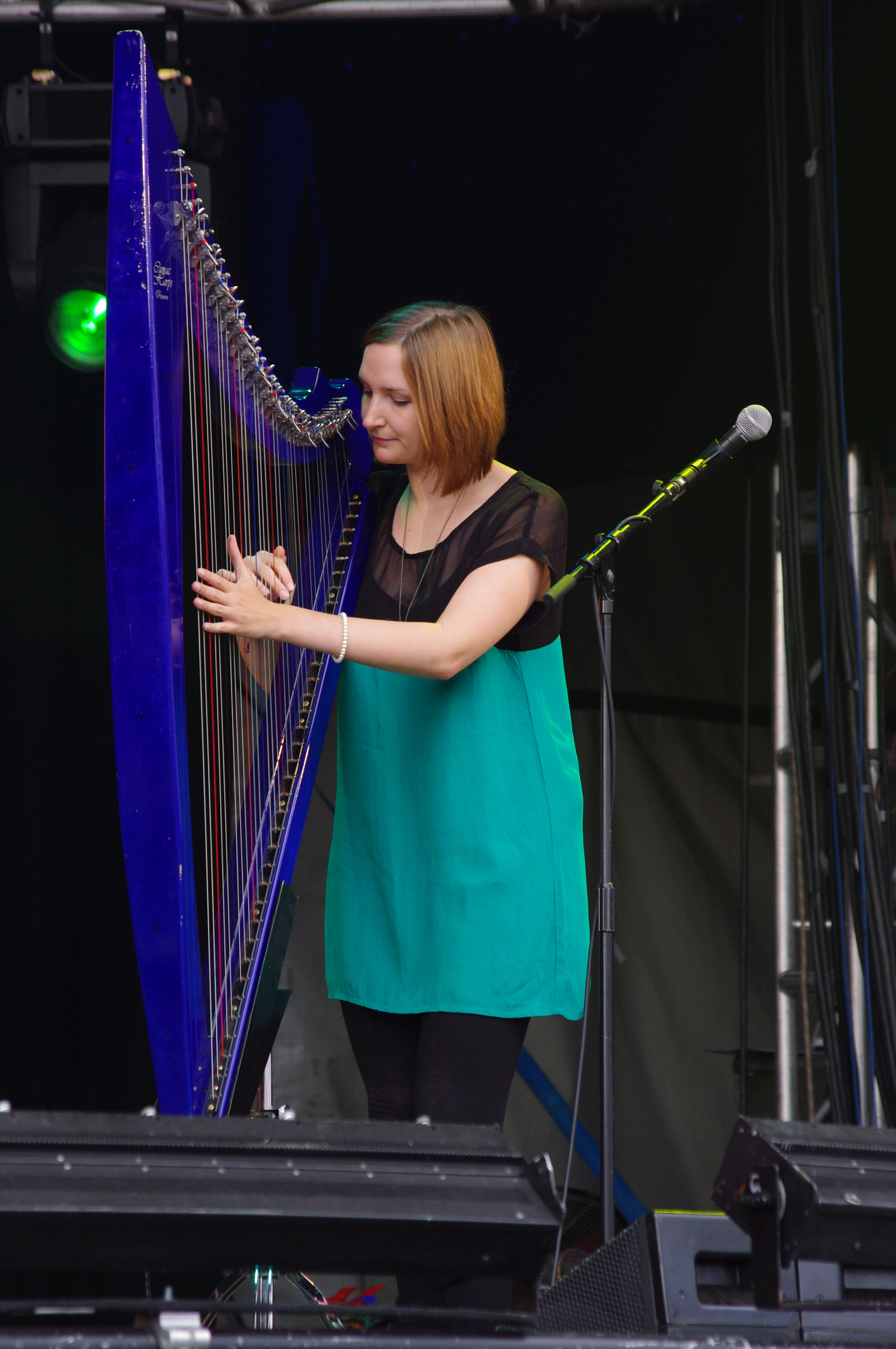
- Newton performing with The Shee, Cropredy Festival, 2011

Background information
- Born: 28 October 1985 (age 41)
- Origin: Edinburgh, Scotland
- Genre: Folk
- Instrument: Harp
- Years active: 2005–present
- Website: www.rachelnewtonmusic.com

Rachel Newton is a Scottish singer and harpist. As well as playing both acoustic and electric harp she also plays viola, fiddle, piano and harmonium. She performs solo and was formerly a member of the Shee, the Emily Portman Trio, Boreas and the Furrow Collective. She is a member of the Lost Words Spell Songs project and is a co-founder of The Bit Collective, a group campaigning for equality in folk music.

== Early life ==
Newton was brought up in Edinburgh and learnt harp, fiddle and classical violin. She spoke English at home and Gaelic to her grandfather. At her Gaelic-language school she sang in both English and Gaelic. During the holidays she would stay with her grandparents in Achnahaird, Wester Ross. At fifteen she decided to make a career in music.

== Musical career ==
=== Formation of The Shee (2005 – 2011) ===
In 2005 Newton formed The Shee with friends Shona Mooney, Laura-Beth Salter, Amy Thatcher, Lillias Kinsman-Blake and Olivia Ross whom she had met while studying for the Folk and Traditional Music degree at Newcastle University. The group perform a mixture of their own works and traditional music, in both English and Gaelic. In 2008 The Shee released their first album A Different Season. fRoots magazine said it had an "air of bold friskiness and abundant energy" and called it "a very impressive debut indeed", and Folkworld described it as "raw, vibrant and powerful". Earlier in 2008 the album Dear Someone had been released under the name Rachel and Lillias, a collaboration between Newton and Kinsman-Blake, who was also part of The Shee.

Newton won for "Best Music and Sound" at the 2009 Critics' Awards for Theatre in Scotland for her work with Rowantree Theatre Company.

Decadence, the second album by The Shee, was released in 2010 containing a mixture of traditional and original music. Colin Irwin writing in fRoots said it showed "confidence, conviction, adeptness and raw talent".

=== The Furrow Collective & first solo releases (2012 – 2015) ===
In 2012 Newton released her first solo album The Shadow Side. The album contained five instrumentals composed by Newton and new arrangements of six other songs, with the original compositions being mentioned by reviewers as the most notable part. The album was nominated for "Album of the Year" at the 2012 Scots Trad Music Awards. Also released the same year was the third album by The Shee, Murmurations. The album was mostly original work with some traditional tunes, with praise directed to the arrangements and the range of musical influences on show. The artwork for the CD showed a murmuration of starlings and was designed so no two CDs had exactly the same arrangement of birds.

Newton's second solo release was the 2014 album Changeling, which was commissioned by the Celtic Connections festival as part of its New Voices series, and premiered in January 2014 at the festival. The album was written by Newton and on the recording she performs vocals and plays harp and viola. It also features Corrina Hewat on vocals and harp, Lauren MacColl on fiddle, Adam Holmes on vocals, Mattie Foulds on percussion, Su-a Lee on cello and musical saw and Alec Frank-Gemmill on horn. The theme was inspired by Scottish folk takes of human children being taken by fairies and replaced by supernatural creatures and the use of this to explain children with behavioural problems and disabilities. In the album Newton wanted to look at the darker side of traditional folk tales and use them to explore feelings about life and death that are hard to express outside of music. Robin Denselow writing in The Guardian gave it 3 stars out of 5 while praising the "haunting vocal work and elegant harp playing" and the Financial Times gave it 4 stars out of 5. Other reviews called it "quietly compelling" and "emotionally stirring".

In 2014 Newton took part in a week-long retreat at Hatfield House, along with Martin Simpson, Nancy Kerr, Jim Moray, Bella Hardy, John Smith and Hannah James as well as Emily Askew, a specialist in early music. The retreat was organised by the English Folk Dance and Song Society and the Folk by the Oak festival to write new works inspired by Elizabethan music. The new music was then performed and released as an album.

The Furrow Collective, a new group made up of Newton, Lucy Farrell, Emily Portman and Alasdair Roberts formed in 2013, released an album in 2014 titled At Our Next Meeting and then released the EP Blow Out the Moon in 2015. The releases were new interpretations of traditional music, with songs chosen with an emphasis on storytelling. With all four members being established artists on the Scottish and English folk scenes the group was described by the British Council as an "Anglo-Scots supergroup". They were nominated for "Best Group" and for "Best Traditional Track" at the 2015 BBC Radio 2 Folk Awards and again nominated for "Best Traditional Track" at the 2016 awards.

=== Third album and Shee anniversary (2016 – 2017) ===
Newton won the 2016 Instrumentalist of the Year at the Scots Trad Music Awards and in the same year won Hands Up for Trad's Ignition Award, an award for artists who are innovating in Scottish traditional music.

Newton's third solo release was Here's My Heart Come Take It in 2016, which was shortlisted for the Scottish Album of the Year Award in 2017. The album was mostly traditional songs in new arrangements, including songs from the Max Hunter songbook and original music for Sir Walter Scott's An Hour With Thee. The album featured Lauren MacColl on fiddle and Mattie Foulds on drums. The album was well reviewed, receiving four stars out of five from both the Guardian and the Financial Times.

To celebrate the 10th anniversary of the Shee, with support from Celtic Connections, the band commissioned folk musicians Andy Cutting, Brian Finnegan, Karine Polwart, Martin Simpson, Kathryn Tickell and Chris Wood to write new works for them. Each composer gave the band the lyrics with some giving a full score and others giving notes or suggested arrangements. The album Continuum comprised four new compositions by the band together with their arrangements of these six compositions.

The next album from the Furrow Collective, Wild Hog, was released in 2016. As with previous releases the album was make up of new versions of traditional songs. As well as the four members of the group the recording featured Stevie Jones on double bass and Alex Neilson on drums. The album got four-star reviews from The Observer, The Guardian and the Financial Times.

In 2016 Newton joined Lori Watson, Britt Pernille Frøholm and Irene Tillung of Tindra to release the album Ahoy Hoy under the name Boreas. The release was a nautical themed album combining traditional Scottish and Norwegian music.

At the 2017 BBC Radio 2 Folk Awards Newton won "Musician of the Year" and the Furrow Collective won "Best Group".

In 2017 Newton announced that she was leaving Emily Portman's Coracle Band and the Emily Portman Trio.

=== Current work (2018 – present) ===
Fathoms, the third album by the Furrow Collective, was released in 2018. As with the previous albums by the group it was made up of new recordings of traditional works. For this album songs were taken from New Zealand, Ireland, the US and Scotland. Reviewers praised the use of harmonies and the atmosphere created, with both the Guardian and the Financial Times giving the album four stars out of five.

Newton's fourth solo album, titled West, was released in 2018. The album was recorded in her late grandparents' croft in Wester Ross, and unlike her previous releases was truly solo, with no other musicians. The album contained a mixture of original tunes and traditional works, with Dolly Parton's song Jolene also included as a nod towards Newton's love of Country and Western music.

In 2019 the album The Lost Words: Spell Songs was released, based on the book The Lost Words by Robert Macfarlane. The book was a response to nature words being removed from the Oxford Junior Dictionary. The album was commissioned by the Folk by the Oak festival and included sections of the book set to music and new compositions inspired by the book. The songs were written and performed by Newton, Kerry Andrew, Julie Fowlis, Kris Drever, Jim Molyneux, Beth Porter, Seckou Keita and Karine Polwart. The album received four stars out of five from The Times, The Guardian and The Evening Standard and five stars from The Financial Times.

In March 2019, Newton curated a weekend's programming at Kings Place in London under the title "Trad. Reclaimed: Women in Folk", as part of the venue's RPS Award-winning series about women composers, "Venus Unwrapped". This included panel discussions, a music theatre piece about Margaret Barry, and performances by The Shee Big Band, Kathryn Tickell and the Darkening and others.

Newton announced in 2020 that her fifth solo album would be funded via Kickstarter. The album reached its funding goal and was released in November 2020 under the title To the Awe. Due to COVID-19 restrictions the album was recorded at home, with Newton recording her vocals in a wardrobe. The album was longlisted for the Scottish Album of the Year Award.

In 2026 is was announced that Newton was leaving the Furrow Collective to focus on solo work.

== Bit Collective ==
Newton is one of the founder members of the Bit Collective, a group addressing issues relating to equality in the Scottish traditional arts scene.

== Discography ==
=== Solo work ===
- The Shadow Side (2012)
- Changeling (2014)
- Here's My Heart Come Take It (2016)
- West (2018)
- To the Awe (2020)

=== Rachel and Lillias ===
- Dear Someone (2008)

=== The Shee ===
- A Different Season (2008)
- Decadence (2010)
- Murmurations (2012)
- Continuum (2016)

=== Boreas ===
- Ahoy Hoy (2016)

=== The Furrow Collective ===
- At Our Next Meeting (2014)
- Blow Out the Moon (EP) (2015)
- Wild Hog (2016)
- Fathoms (2018)

=== Other projects ===
- The Elizabethan Session (2014)
- The Lost Words: Spell Songs (2019)
