= Traces (Karine Polwart album) =

Studio album by Karine Polwart
- Released: August 2012
- Genre: Folk
- Label: Neon
- Producer: Iain Cook

Karine Polwart chronology
This Earthly Spell (2008)	Traces (2012)	A Pocket of Wind Resistance (2017)

Traces is the fifth studio album by Scottish folk musician Karine Polwart, released in 2012. It was her first solo album in four years, though she had appeared as part of the collaborations Darwin Song Project, The Burns Unit and The Fruit Tree Foundation.

The album included a new recording of "We're All Leaving" (previously recorded as part of the Darwin Song Project) and nine new songs, including tracks inspired by the Occupy London protests ("King of Birds"), Donald Trump's controversial golf course development in Aberdeenshire ("Cover Your Eyes") and the 1982 murder of Susan Maxwell ("Half a Mile"). More whimsically, "Tinsel Show" is about Grangemouth Refinery. "Tears for Lot's Wife" is based on a poem by Anna Akhmatova. Although all of Polwart's albums except Fairest Floo'er were released with lyric booklets, Traces was the first to contain liner notes explaining the background to all of the songs.

The album was Polwart's first official UK Top 75 entry, peaking at number 57.

Traces was shortlisted as Best Album for the BBC Radio 2 Folk Awards 2013, with "King of Birds" shortlisted as Best Original Song and Polwart as Folk Singer of the Year. Traces was also shortlisted for Album of the Year at the Scots Trad Music Awards and the Scottish Music Industry Association's SAY (Scottish Album of the Year) award.

== Track listing ==
1. "Cover Your Eyes"
2. "King Of Birds"
3. "Tears For Lot's Wife"
4. "Don't Worry"
5. "We're All Leaving"
6. "Tinsel Show"
7. "Strange News"
8. "Sticks 'n' Stones"
9. "Salters Road"
10. "Half A Mile"

== Personnel ==
- Karine Polwart: acoustic and tenor guitar, Indian harmonium, shruti box, percussion, vocals
- Steven Polwart: acoustic and electric guitars, vocals
- Kevin McGuire: double bass, vocals
- Inge Thomson: piano accordion, glockenspiel, percussion, sansula, vocals
- Iain cook: piano, keyboards, percussion
- Steven Cowling: horn
- Leila Dunn: clarinet
- Mattie Foulds: percussion
- Sarah Hayes: flute
- Tom Poulson, Alex Trotter: trumpets
- Iain Sandilands: marimba, snare, vibraphone
