= Scribbled in Chalk =

Studio album by Karine Polwart
- Released: 7 March 2006
- Genre: Folk

Karine Polwart chronology
Faultlines (2004)	Scribbled in Chalk (2006)	Fairest Floo'er (2007)

Professional ratings
Review scores
Source	Rating
Allmusic	link

Scribbled in Chalk is the second studio album by Scottish folk musician Karine Polwart, released on 7 March 2006.

The album was shortlisted for Best Album at the Scots Trad Music Awards, and the track "Daisy" won Best Original Song at the BBC Radio 2 Folk Awards.

== Track listing ==
All songs by Karine Polwart.

1. "Hole in the Heart" – 4:48
2. "I'm Gonna Do It All" – 4:56
3. "Daisy" – 3:27
4. "Maybe There's a Road" – 4:17
5. "Where the Smoke Blows" – 3:16
6. "Holy Moses" – 4:30
7. "Don't Know Why" – 4:39
8. "Take Its Own Time" – 3:45
9. "I've Seen It All" – 3:22
10. "Baleerie Baloo" – 3:27
11. "Terminal Star" – 4:38
12. "Follow the Heron" – 3:11

"Daisy" and "I'm Gonna Do It All" were also released as CD singles. A music video was made for the latter in which the song was lip-synched by a 9-year-old girl, the daughter of former Karine Polwart Band member Dean Owens. The "Daisy" single included acoustic versions of "Where the Smoke Blows" and "Terminal Star" as bonus tracks; "I'm Gonna Do It All" included the video and a non-album track, "John C. Clark (The Gasman Song)".

== Personnel ==
- Karine Polwart: acoustic guitar, lead vocals
- Steven Polwart: acoustic and electric guitars
- Kevin McGuire: double bass, vocals
- Mattie Foulds: drums, percussion, vocals
- Inge Thomson: piano accordion, melodica, triangle, vocals
- Martin Green: Hammond, loop station, Moog, Wurlitzer
- Corrina Hewat: acoustic and electro harp, vocals
- Dave Milligan: piano
- Kerry Polwart: glockenspiel, vocals
