= Paul Harrison (musician) =

British musician

Paul Harrison is a British jazz pianist, keyboard player, organist and composer who lives and works in Glasgow.

He studied at the University of Edinburgh during the 1990s, and the Guildhall School of Music and Drama. He won the Best Pianist award at the first Scottish Jazz Awards, presented in Glasgow in 2009. He has released several albums under his own name and that of his group, "Trianglehead", and in addition has contributed to many other recordings in jazz, techno, pop, salsa and folk genres. He has composed music for a short film, the animated feature Criminology, Episode 1 by Robert Zywietz.

== Discography ==
- 2021 Debra Salem, Kevin Mackenzie, Paul Harrison – In a Sma Room (DSMS1002)
- 2019 Herschel 36 – Astrophysik (LS004)
- 2019 Simon Thacker's Ritmata – Taradh (STMRCD05)
- 2017 Sugarwork – Sugarwork (Harriphonic 1801)
- 2016 Stu Brown – Twisted Toons Vol.2, The Music of Carl Stalling, Scott Bradley and more... (LS002)
- 2013 Paul Harrison – Ten Play Ten (Harriphonic 1301)
- 2010 Martin Kershaw – Hero as Riddle – (THEADCD003)
- 2010 The DT6 – "Donkey Chop" – (Starla Records SRC1005)
- 2009 Paul Towndrow – Newology (Keywork Records KWRCD009)
- 2009 The DT6 – "Don’t Doubt Me" – (Starla Records SRC1001)
- 2008 Martina Almgren / Laura Macdonald Quartet – Open Book (Imogena IGCD150)
- 2008 Carol Kidd – This time the dream's on me (Linn AKD325)
- 2007 Trianglehead – Exit Strategy (THEADCD002)
- 2005 Trianglehead – Maths (THEADCD001)
- 2005 Freddie King – Diggin’ Deep (Kande KR00074)
- 2005 Ross Milligan – Passing Places
- 2005 Heather McLeod – Crossing Tides (LEOD Music)
- 2004 Graeme Scott – Say Hello
- 2003 Karine Polwart – Faultlines (NEONCD005)
- 2003 Blair Douglas – Angels from the Ashes (Foot Stompin')
- 2003 Paul Towndrow – Colours (FMR)
- 2002 Cathie Rae – Time Out (JBS01)
- 2002 Jane Butters – Nose Down
- 2002 Joz Tenuto Big Band – Research and Development
- 2002 Joz Tenuto Big Band with Ford Kiernan – Swing When Yer’ Mingin (Bagatelle Records)
- 2001 Yush versus the Beatfreekz – The Return (Yush YUSH015)
- 2001 Le Bleu – 'Out of… le BLEU' (Pickled Egg Records EGG25)
- 2000 Eddie Severn – Moments in Time (Caber Music CABER016)
- 2000 Salsa Celtica – The Great Scottish Latin Adventure (Greentrax G2CD7005)
- 2000 Paul Harrison Trio – Nemesis (Caber Music CABER013)
- 1999 Tom Jones & Cerys Matthews – "Baby, It's Cold Outside" – Yush Remix (Gut Records CXGUT29)
- 1999 Disorient – Homeward EP (Tronic Sole Music TSOLE018)
