= Faultlines (album) =

Studio album by Karine Polwart
- Released: 19 January 2004
- Genre: Folk
- Label: Neon

Karine Polwart chronology
Faultlines (2004)	Scribbled in Chalk (2006)

Professional ratings
Review scores
Source	Rating
AllMusic	4/5 stars

Faultlines is the debut studio album by Scottish folk musician Karine Polwart, released on 19 January 2004.

Faultlines won the Best Album award at the BBC Radio 2 Folk Awards, with the track "The Sun's Comin' Over The Hill" winning Best Original Song and Polwart herself receiving the Horizon Award for best new artist.

== Track listing ==
All tracks by Karine Polwart, except where noted.

1. "Only One Way" – 2:53
2. "Faultlines" – 3:16
3. "Four Strong Walls" – 3:47
4. "The Sun's Comin' Over The Hill" – 4:57
5. "Resolution Road" – 3:38
6. "Waterlily" – 4:34
7. "What Are You Waiting For?" – 2:47
8. "Skater of the Surface" – 3:27
9. "Harder To Walk These Days Than Run" – 3:48 (Polwart/Corrina Hewat)
10. "The Light On The Shore" – 4:24
11. "Azalea Flower" – 5:19

== Personnel ==
- Karine Polwart: vocals, harmony vocals, acoustic guitar
- Mattie Foulds: drums, percussion
- Corrina Hewat: electro-harp, harmony vocals
- Kevin McGuire: double bass;
- Steven Polwart: nylon, acoustic and electric guitars, banjo
- Phil Bancroft: tenor saxophone
- Doug Duncan: trumpet
- Paul Harrison: Hammond organ
- Aidan O'Rourke: fiddle
- Dean Owens, Emily Smith: harmony vocals
- Julian Sutton: melodeon
