= The Death of Queen Jane =

Traditional song

"The Death of Queen Jane" is an English ballad that describes the events surrounding the death of a Queen Jane. It is catalogued by Francis James Child as Child #170. Some of the versions given are Scottish, in which the queen's name is Jeanie or Jeany.

Though the circumstances of the ballad's composition are not documented, a close correspondence of names and events suggests that it very likely describes Jane Seymour, the third wife of Henry VIII of England. Historically, Jane Seymour gave birth to a son who became Edward VI on 12 October 1537. Unlike in the ballad, where the queen dies of caesarean section, the real Queen Jane gave birth naturally and died of a fever twelve days later.

== Synopsis ==
There are 20 versions of the song given by Child, but they are consistent in the basic tale. Queen Jane is in difficult labour – the time given ranges from three days to an astonishing six weeks – and asks a succession of people to cut open her sides and save her baby. Each refuses her in turn, understanding that this would cause her death. She asks for others to be sent to her – variously her mother, a surgeon or doctor, and King Henry – and of each she makes the same request. Finally someone – King Henry in most versions – succumbs to her pleas and the surgery is done, whereupon she dies. The song ends with descriptions of the mourning, and most versions contrast the joy at the birth of a male heir with the grief over the death of the queen.

== Versions ==
The relationship between Queen Jane and King Henry is described as a loving one in the ballad. In the versions in which he is sent for to hear her plea he is shown as first refusing:

King Henry was sent for, and sat by her bedside:
'Why weep you, Queen Jeany? your eyes are so red.'
'O Henry, O Henry, do this one thing for me,
Let my side straight be opend, and save my babie!'

'O Jeany, O Jeany, this never will do,
It will leese thy sweet life, and thy young babie too.'

— Version 170C

Only when she falls into a swoon – presumably interpreted that she was going to die anyway - are her instructions followed.

She wept and she wailed, till she fell in a swoon:
Her side it was opened, the babie was found.

— Version 170C

Version 170D makes this explicit:

The surgeon was sent for, he came with all speed,
In a gown of black velvet from heel to the head;
He gave her rich caudle, but the death-sleep slept she,
Then her right side was opened, and the babe was set free.

Many versions describe King Henry weeping, his grief for his wife overcoming his joy for his son. One version mentions Princess Elizabeth, who became Elizabeth I as the one who "goes weeping away."

== Text of version 170B ==
The text is given with the original spelling as Child gives it. This version is one of the more complete ones, and contains most of the story elements found in any of the versions.

There are a few words which may be unfamiliar to modern English speakers.

traveld
laboured or travailed, as in childbirth
meikle
great
ha
hall

=== Text ===
Queen Jeanie, Queen Jeanie, traveld six weeks and more,
Till women and midwives had quite gien her oer:
O if ye were women as women should be,
Ye would send for a doctor, a doctor to me.'

The doctor was called for and set by her bedside:
'What aileth thee, my ladie, thine eyes seem so red?'
'O doctor, O doctor, will ye do this for me,
To rip up my two sides and save my babie?'

'Queen Jeanie, Queen Jeanie, that's the thing I'll neer do,
To rip up your two sides to save your babie:'
Queen Jeanie, Queen Jeanie, traveld six weeks and more,
Till women and midwives had quite gien her oer.

'O if you were doctors as doctors should be,
Ye would send for King Henry, King Henry to me:'
King Henry was called for and sat by her bedside,
'What aileth thee, Jeanie? what aileth my bride?'

'King Henry, King Henry, will you do this for me,
To rip up my two sides, and save my babie?'
'Queen Jeanie, Queen Jeanie, that's what I'll never do,
To rip up your two sides to save your babie.'

But with sighing and sobbing she's fallen in a swoon,
Her side it was ript up, and her babie was found;
At this bonnie babie's christning there was meikle joy and mirth,
But bonnie Queen Jeanie lies cold in the earth.

Six and six coaches, and six and six more,
And royal King Henry went mourning before;
O two and two gentlemen carried her away,
But royal King Henry went weeping away.

O black were their stockings, and black were their bands,
And black were the weapons they held in their hands;
O black were their mufflers, and black were their shoes,
And black were the chevrons they drew on their luves.

They mourned in the kitchen, and the mourned in the ha,
But royal King Henry mourned langest of a':
Farewell to fair England, farewell for evermore!
For the fair flower of England will never shine more.

== In song ==
- Bascom Lamar Lunsford recorded a short Appalachian variant of this ballad in 1935. This recording is available on the Smithsonian Folkways album Bascom Lamar Lunsford: Ballads, Banjo Tunes and Sacred Songs of Western North Carolina.
- An original melody composed for this song by Irish guitarist and singer Dáithí Sproule has been widely recorded, including by The Bothy Band, Trian (Liz Carroll, Billy McComiskey and Dáithí Sproule), Loreena McKennitt, Maria Doyle Kennedy, Jon Boden, Méav Ní Mhaolchatha, 10,000 Maniacs, Oscar Isaac in the movie Inside Llewyn Davis, and others.
- The ballad is included in Loreena McKennitt's The Wind That Shakes the Barley album.
- Recorded by Carol Noonan (Carol Noonan Band) as "Queen Jane" on her recording "The Only Witness" (Philo, CD PH 1209, 1997).
- A version of the song was recorded by Joan Baez on the album Joan Baez/5.
- A version of this song was recorded by Andreas Scholl under the title "King Henry" for his album English Folksongs and Lute Songs.
- A version was recorded by Karine Polwart on her 2007 album Fairest Floo'er.
- A version of this song was recorded by 10,000 Maniacs on the album Twice Told Tales (2015).
