= Tristan Le Govic =

Breton harpist & singer (born 1976)

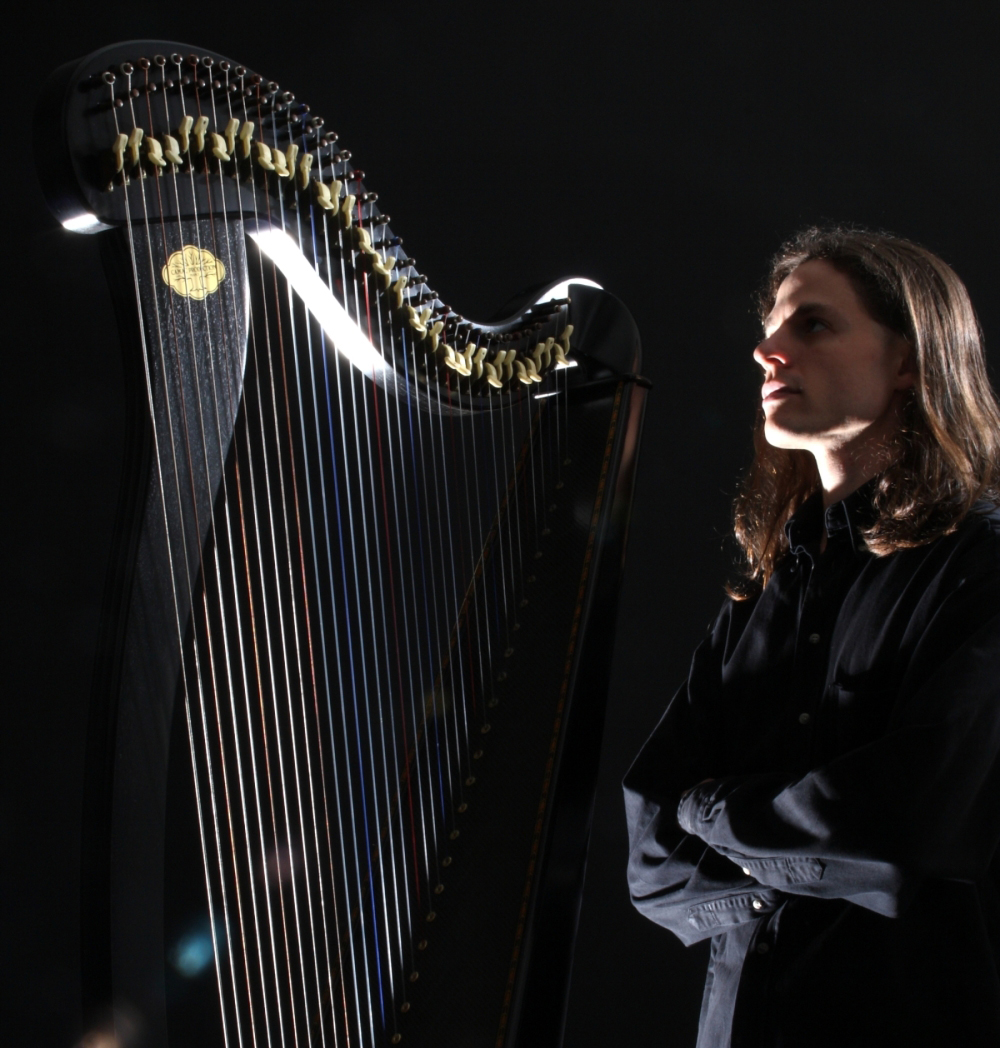
- Tristan Le Govic

Background information
- Born: 1976 (age 49–50)
- Origin: Brittany
- Genres: Celtic music Traditional music Cross-over; Fusion
- Occupations: Musician, composer, teacher
- Instruments: Celtic harp, Vocals
- Website: tristanlegovic.eu

Tristan Le Govic is a Breton harpist, singer, and composer, born in 1976 in Plœmeur. He holds a PhD in musicology and performs a repertoire on the Celtic harp and the electroharp, mixing traditional tunes from the Celtic countries with his original compositions.

== Biography ==
Tristan Le Govic discovered the Celtic harp at the Festival Interceltique de Lorient. He began learning the instrument at the age of seven at the traditional music conservatory in Soye (Plœmeur), before continuing his studies at the Lorient National School of Music, where he notably studied under Mariannig Larc'hantec.

He later joined the Conservatoire of Rennes in the class of Annie Chaylade, where he was awarded a gold medal in Celtic harp as well as in chamber music in 1998.

Alongside his musical training, he pursued academic studies at the University of Rennes 2. He obtained a Master’s degree in music in 2002 in partnership with University College Cork in Ireland, with a thesis focusing on the contemporary repertoire of the Irish harp.

He also holds a State Diploma as a music teacher (traditional instrument). He later moved to Scotland, where he taught Celtic harp in Glasgow between 2008 and 2012. In 2025, he completed a PhD in musicology at the University of Rennes 2, with a dissertation devoted to the music work of Kristen Noguès.

== Artistic activities ==
From the mid-1990s, Tristan Le Govic composed music for theatre and film. In 1996, he wrote the score for La Légende de la Mort, a play by Danièle Laroche based on the work of Anatole Le Braz.

He also composed for several films and documentaries, including Pêcher à Islande (1996), Le Sauvetage des naufragés en baie d’Audierne (1997), and La Chambre obscure (1998).

His compositional work also includes concert pieces such as Lusk, written as part of his academic studies for Celtic harp, strings, and percussions.

He began his recording career with the album Dasson ur Galon (2006), followed by Awen (2009). For the album Elva (2014), he collaborated with Swedish singer Lise Enochsson, Scottish double bassist Stuart Macpherson, English percussionist Roy Shearer, Swedish percussionist Per Nord, and Breton musicians André Le Meut and Pascal Lamour.

The album Dañs was recorded in 2018 with Tangi Le Hénanff and Alan Quéré-Moysan and the Swedish flautist Markus Tullberg.

== Awards and distinctions ==
- 1995: Kan ar Bobl (Pontivy), First Prize (unanimous jury decision)
- 1998: European Music Competition (Montdidier), First Prize (unanimous), with special jury mention
- 1998: UFAM International Competition (Paris), First Prize (unanimous), with jury congratulations
- 1999: Artistic Competition (Épinal), First Prize (unanimous), with jury congratulations
- 2007: Danny Kyle Open Stage, Celtic Connections (Glasgow), “Highly Recommended”
- 2007: Lowland & Border Pipers’ Society (Edinburgh), First prize in the duo category with Jean-Luc Lefaucheur
- 2018: Nevez Flamm (Melrand), “Révélation groupe de fest-noz”, with the Tristan Le Govic Trio

== Discography ==
- 2006: Dasson ur Galon (Tristan Le Govic, TCD01)
- 2009: Awen (Tristan Le Govic, TCD02)
- 2014: Elva (Tristan Le Govic and Lise Enochsson, TCD03)
- 2018: Dañs (Tristan Le Govic Trio, TCD04)

=== Collaborations ===
- 2004: Telenn – Harpe Celtique, l’Anthologie vol. 1 (Coop Breizh)
- 2021: Er Bed arall (Pascal Lamour, BNC)
- 2025: Sur les pas du vent (Piau)
- 2025: Song of the Oak and the Ivy (Corrina Hewat)
- 2025: A galon vat (Kanerion Pleuigner)

== Sheet music ==
- 2008: Dasson ur Galon (Luskadenn)
- 2008: Island (Luskadenn)
- 2009: Awen (Luskadenn)
- 2014: Elva (Tristan Le Govic)
- 2018: Dañs (Tristan Le Govic)

=== Collaborations ===
- 2010: Scottish Harp Anthology (Ailie Robertson)
- 2015: Antologiez Telenn Breizh: L'Anthologie de la Harpe Bretonne (Tristan Le Govic)

== Publications ==
- 2001: L’Anthologie de la Harpe, la Harpe des Celtes (CRIHC)
- 2025: Harp Studies (Four Court Press)

== Bibliography ==
- 2002: Tristan Le Govic, Le Répertoire contemporain de la harpe irlandaise, Master’s thesis, Rennes 2 University
- 2005: Tristan Le Govic, Pédagogie de la harpe celtique, dissertation
