= The Dark Peak and the White =

The Dark Peak and The White

Studio album by Bella Hardy
- Released: 7 May 2012
- Genre: Folk music
- Length: 47:42
- Label: Noe Records
- Producer: Kris Drever

Bella Hardy chronology
Songs Lost & Stolen (2011)	The Dark Peak and The White (2012)	Battleplan (2013)

The Dark Peak and The White is the fourth album by folk singer Bella Hardy, released in 2012. The album was produced by Kris Drever.

== Track listing ==
No.	Title	Length
1.	"The Driving of the Deer"	3:19
2.	"Emmott's Song"	3:14
3.	"The Elegy"	4:11
4.	"Fin Cop"	5:29
5.	"The Drunken Butcher of Tideswell"	6:00
6.	"Lament for Derwent Village"	4:21
7.	"The Derbyshire Miller"	2:30
8.	"The Ilam Lullaby"	2:57
9.	"Bradwell's Lost Daughter"	4:18
10.	"Castleton Gypsies"	1:37
11.	"Dain's Mill"	1:09
12.	"Henry and Clara"	5:23
13.	"Peak Rhapsody"	3:14

== Personnel ==
- Bella Hardy - Vocals, Fiddle, Piano, Harmonium & Feet
- Kris Drever - Guitar, Mandolin, Vocals, Double Bass, Slide Guitar & Feet
- Emma Hardy - Vocals on Castleton Gypsies & Peak Rhapsody
- Rachel Newton - Vocals on Castleton Gypsies
- Laura-Beth Salter - Vocals on Castleton Gypsies
