= Phamie Gow =

Scottish singer

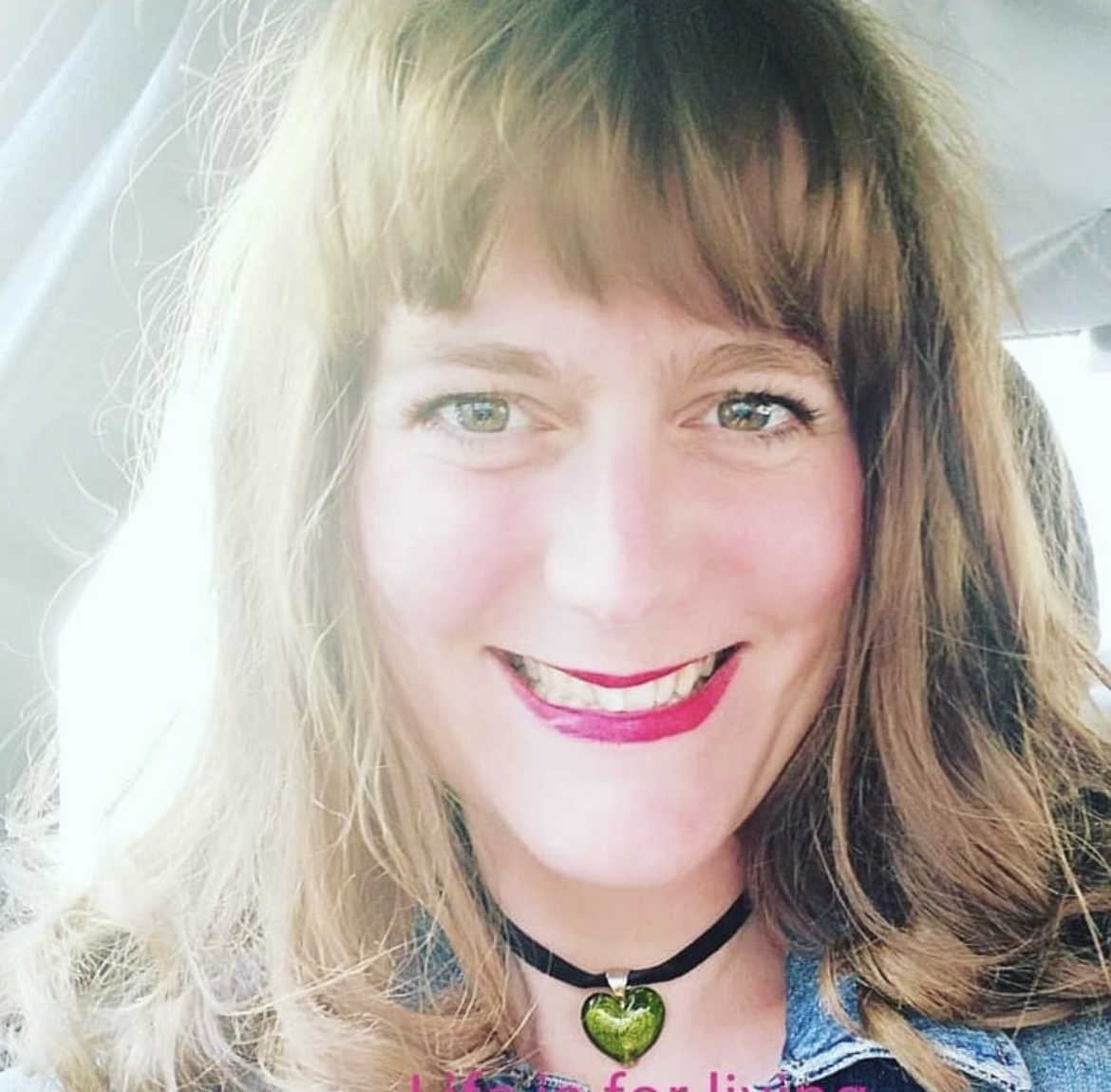
- Phamie in France in 2023

Background information
- Born: Scottish Borders Scotland
- Genres: Songs and instrumental, classical/Celtic crossover
- Occupations: Musician, composer, singer-songwriter and poet, producer, musical director, creative director, artist and visionary.
- Instruments: Harp,(acoustic and electric), piano, voice
- Website: www.phamiegow.com

Phamie Gow is a composer, musician, folk and sacred music singer, multi-instrumentalist, musical director and producer. Her work is often associated with Classical and Celtic crossover music. She is the creative director and producer of Wildfire Records and Publishing house, an independent label and music publishing company, and has also produced and directed short films and music videos. Her music has been broadcast on national UK radio stations around the world.

Gow is also an advocate for peacemaking initiatives through the humanities.

== Early life and education ==
Gow was born in Scotland and has spent periods living in Europe and United States. She began performing publicly at the age of 11, after teaching herself to play the Celtic small harp using a tutor book and cassette. She later studied classical piano with composer and concert pianist Ronald Stevenson, after having been a student of his daughter, Savourna Savourna.

At 15, Gow achieved a distinction in her Grade 8 ABRSM music exam. She was among the first students to be accepted to study a Bachelor of Arts Degree in Scottish Music at The Royal Scottish Academy of Music and Drama (now the Royal Conservatoire of Scotland) in Glasgow, where she focussed on the Celtic harp, while continuing private studies in piano and composition. In her early twenties, she returned to the Royal Conservatoire to teach piano for a period.

Her first commission as a composer came at the age of 16 for a local short film on the subject of the Millenium. She wrote "Annandale", later included on her album Moments of Time, which has been broadcast on Classic FM and included in classical music compilation releases. It was listed into the Classical British music charts on Classic FM.

Gow moved to Glasgow at the age of 17. She later received a Danny Award at Glasgow's Celtic Connections festival, leading to Gow's second composition commission, Lammermuir. This work featured musicians including Alasdair Fraser, Eric Rigler, and Mairi Campbell. Lammermuir was later released as her second album, licensed from Wildfire Records and Publishing to Greentrax Ltd. She performed this work in the main auditorium at the Glasgow Royal Concert Hall, opening for Seaumus Heaney and Liam O'Flynn. In a later anniversary performance at the same venue, the work was presented in an orchestrated version with the Royal Scottish National Orchestra (RSNO), conducted by Teddy Abrams, with several original collaborators returning.

In 2000, Gow took time away from performing due to ill health, during which time she composed for theater, including music for A Winter's Tale directed by Hugh Hogdart.

=== Career ===
In between the year 2000 and 2025 (leading up to the pandemic), Gow represented herself performing, sometimes with a backing band, in concert halls, festivals, and special occasions around Europe, North and South America, China and travelled extensively with her music to various other countries. Gow has also had the opportunity to collaborate with many leading artists such as Carlos Nuñez in Spain, Kepa Junkera from Bilbao, Band of Horses from USA, Marisa Monte from Brasil, Philip Glass in USA, Ashley MacIsaac from Canada and many more and performed in The Carnegie Hall, NYC alongside Ray Davies and Sufjan Stevens and other stars. She co-produced The Angels' Share, her seventh album, alongside Hollywood music producer Steve McGlaughlan in London's Metropolis Studios featuring The Royal Scots Dragoon Guards and the LMO (London Metropolitan Orchestra). She has also worked closely musically directing and scoring for theatre and dance companies and short films and TV scores. Her music has been played regularly on Classic FM, BBC Radio 4, 3 and other music stations around the world.

In 2023 she released her 11th solo album entitled Dancing Hands Remastered, featuring some of the best Celtic and world music musicians from Scotland and abroad. This album offers a platform for Gow's voice to be heard singing her own song "Sea and Sailors". She also directed this music video in collaboration with Alexander Peacock of Peacock Studios, and is available on YouTube and on her website.

== Music ==
Phamie has released 11 solo albums and her debut album, Winged Spirit, when she was 19.

She has been invited as a headlining act to perform around Europe, United Kingdom, North and South America (Brazil, Chile, Argentina, Paraguay), Canada, and China.

Her 9th release Beyond the Milky Way came to fruition, and was chosen for Classic FM's Drive Discovery, and was described on Alan Titchmarsh' show as being his 'Great British discovery'. The piano solo composition Sweet Frederik has reached over 10 million plays on Spotify in less than a year. Her eighth album, Softly Spoken, was chosen as "Album of the Week" by John Suchet at Classic FM. Her seventh, released in August 2012, The Angels' Share which includes Edinburgh, was a commissioned work featuring Classic Brit Award winners, the Royal Scots Dragoon Guards and the London Metropolitan Orchestra, recorded in Metropolis Studios, Chiswick, London. A composition from the album was incorporated and choreographed for The Royal Edinburgh Military Tattoo in 2012, and was also broadcast on BBC 1 TV. Phamie's work has been featured on the BBC 4 TV documentary about Royal Scots Dragoon Guards and has been featured often on BBC Radio.

Sweet Frederik has been featured on multiple occasions on BBC Radio 4.

Phamie has performed around the world on such occasions as the Opening of the Scottish Parliament in Edinburgh in July 2011, where Queen Elizabeth II of the United Kingdom was present, albeit not directly while Phamie performed; the Closing Ceremony of the London Olympics 2012 in Scotland House, Pall Mall, London, commissioned by the Scottish Government and Creative Scotland. Phamie has performed for the Dalai Lama; Princess Anne and Prince Charles before he was King.

In 2007 she morphed her performing skills in a different nature and starred in The Broadway sellout show, Tapeire, which led to her performing on the Regis and Kelly Show in the USA alongside world-renowned Irish tap dancer James Divine and Canada's Celtic superstar fiddler Ashley MacIsaac. Phamie has worked and collaborated with many international artists such as Band of Horses (USA), Carlos Núñez (Spain), Marisa Monte (Brasil), Ashley MacIsaac (Canada), and Alan Stivell (France), Kepa Junkera (Bilbao) and more.

Phamie was commissioned to write and musically direct the Vox Motus production of The Infamous Brothers Davenport, which had a run of 32 performances in Edinburgh's Royal Lyceum, Glasgow's Citizen's Theatre and the Eden Court Theatre in Inverness.

Phamie is the founder and director of Wildfire Records and Publishing, which has published over 30 sound recordings digitally as well as physically, and numerous books of original piano and harp music and scores. 'Dancing Hands' has been selected to be a part of the ABRSM syllabus for advanced harp players in 2025.

Her piano piece War Song made it to the 2021 and 2023 Hall of Fame at Classic FM 2021 charts and has been released on numerous Classic FM/Universal compilation albums. Her works on the piano are regularly given airplay on Classic FM. She also was voted into The Great British Classics Charts of 2023 for Rackwick Bay and War Song at Classic FM as well as the Hall of Fame in 2021, 2023 and 2025.

She was officially the number one most played Artist in Caffè Nero for over two years running.

Another commissioned work by Hector Christie was to compose 'The Death of Tibbie Tamson' to raise awareness of this Scottish Borders' story.

In July 2022 10 minutes of Phamie's music was chosen to be performed at White Hall, on The Horse Guard Parade in London by The Household Division in the show A Military Musical Spectacular to an audience of thousands of people each show in celebration the late Queen's Platinum Jubilee.

2023 she released various singles and her 11th album Dancing Hands Remastered which is available digitally.

Her first piano solo album, ‘’Moments of Time’’ has reached over 2 million listens on Spotify as an independent artist and label.

== Charity concerts ==
Phamie was the first World Peace Tartan Ambassador promoting peace in the world from the heart of Scotland. She was an ambassador for Nordoff-Robbins music therapy. In 2010 Phamie organised benefit concert 'A Cry Out for Chile', with the money raised going to the Chilean Red Cross and the Victor Jara Society to help victims of the earth quake and tsunami there. In 2008 Philip Glass invited her to take part in the 'Tibet House Benefit Concert' at the Carnegie Hall in New York City. She performed with then with Band of Horses, Marisa Monte, Ashley MacIsaac, and alongside Ray Davies and Sufjan Stevens.[2]. She also sang in Mahler's Symphony no 8 in the Carnegie Hall, New York in January 2013 where she was invited to sing soprano alongside the 999 other performers. In 2015 she won the kindred spirit award for music beating Celtic super stars such as Moya Brennan and others. Phamie also made a guest appearance for a benefit concert for Ukraine at The Voodoo Lounge, Edinburgh, UK. Scotland in May 2022 where she premiered her composition 'Peace Song for Ukraine' which was later performed by acclaimed concert pianist Anna Fedorova in The Queens Hall which is a very familiar stage for Phamie herself to perform.

== Commissions ==
- 1997: commissioned to write for the opening of the extension to Edinburgh Airport. 'Highflyer'
- 1998: commissioned to write the sound track to a short film about Dumfries and Galloway. 'Annandale'
- 1999: New Voices Commission for Celtic Connections, Glasgow, Scotland. 'Lammermuir'
- 1999: commissioned to write the musical score for The Winters Tale theatre production directed by Hugh Hogart at The Royal Scottish Academy of Music and Drama. Glasgow. Scotland
- 2000: commissioned to write a song for the Gaelic Choir of Edinburgh, Scotland.
- 2000: commissioned to write the music for Le Roi Cerf by Le Petit Pied Theatre Company, Paris, France, directed by Josephine de Meaux
- 2001: commissioned to write a composition for Real CD and wrote Death of Tibbie Tamson
- 2001: commissioned to write sound track for Morpheus Theatre production of Pilot
- 2002: commissioned to write the sound track for film Across the Waters by director Sana Bilgrami
- 2011: commissioned to write The Edinburgh Suite The Angels' Share by Tim Hollier of Atlantic Screen Music
- 2012: commissioned by Vox Motus to write the sound track to the theatre production of The Infamous Brothers Davenport

== Discography ==
- 1999 – Winged Spirit
- 2001 – Lammermuir
- 2005 – Dancing Hands
- 2007 – Moments of Time
- 2008 – La Vida Buena – The Good Life
- 2011 – Road of the Loving Heart
- 2012 – The Angels' Share
- 2013 – Softly Spoken
- 2018 – Beyond the Milky Way
- 2018 – "The Peace Farmer" (single-digital)
- 2019 – The Sea Inside of Me Single and EP
- 2019 – Bu Tusa An Gaol
- 2019 – The Traveller
- 2019 – In the Bleak Midwinter single and EP
- 2020 - Stone Dance of the Chameleon single
- 2020 - You are my Haven single
- 2020 - Seeing the Light single
- 2020 - Summer Rain single
- 2020 - Harp Land single
- 2020 - Leaving Lonely Lands single
- 2020 - Piano Improvisations - album (digital version)
- 2021 - Piano Improvisations album
- 2021 - Hope is the thing with feathers Single
- 2021 - 9/11 I'm Still Waiting Single
- 2022 - Peace Song for Ukraine Single
- 2022 - Purple Ribbon Music Video
- 2023 - Not Alone Music video and single
- 2023 - Sea and Sailors Single and music video
- 2023 - Carnival single
- 2023 - Sea and Sailors Music video and single
- 2023 - Dancing Hands Remastered album (digitally ONLY)
- 2023 - Dancing Hands Remastered Music video (YouTube)
- 2024 - Traveller of the Waves (digital release only)
- 2025 - Métrophobique single release
- 2025 - ‘’ Follow your Heart’’ Single
- 2025 - ‘’In the bleak midwinter’’ piano solo single
