= Iain Morrison (musician) =

Scottish musician

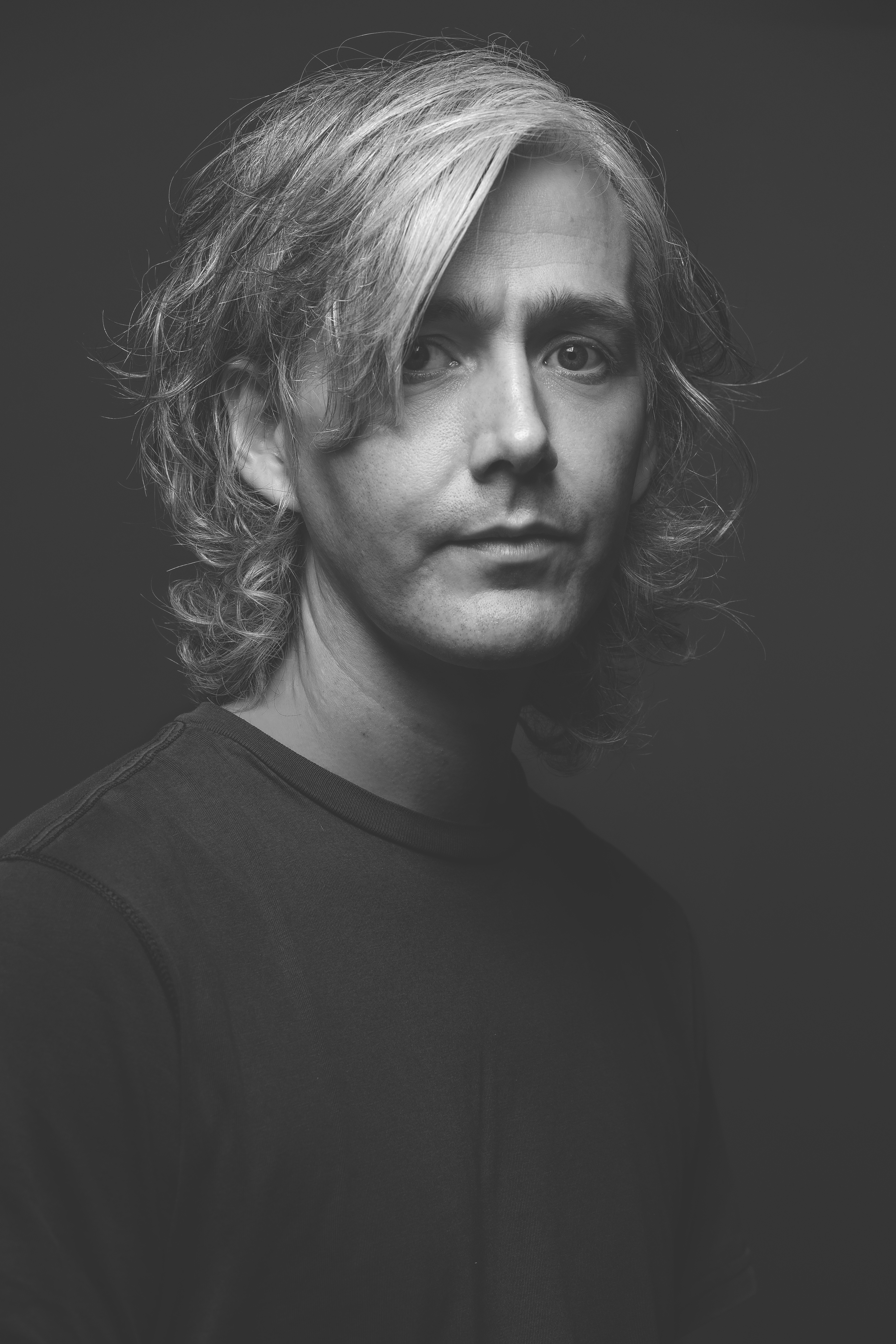
Morrison in 2015

Iain Morrison is a Scottish musician and singer-songwriter. He was born on the Isle of Lewis in the Outer Hebrides.

== Career ==
Morrison was a member of the Glasgow-based band Crash My Model Car. They were signed to V2 Records in 2005 and released an album Ghosts & Heights.

He won Composer of the Year at The Scots Trad Music Awards in 2010. He was commissioned the same year by the Celtic Connections Festival in Glasgow, to write songs for a New Voices showcase. The show, titled Ceol Mor/Little Music, received a 5 star review from The Scotsman newspaper.

He appeared on three programmes of the BBC TV series Transatlantic Sessions in 2011, singing three of his own songs alongside Bela Fleck, Danny Thompson and Jerry Douglas. He sang the part of Orpheus for Anaïs Mitchell's Hadestown show in Glasgow in 2011.

To record his 2012 album To the Horizon, Sir, Morrison traveled to Vermont and the home studio of producer and friend Michael Chorney. His 2015 album, Eas, was chosen as 'Album of the Year 2015' on BBC Radio Scotland's The Roddy Hart Show. Eas was nominated for the Scottish Album of the Year Award, at the SAY Awards in 2016.

In May 2018, he released two albums, Amusement Arcade and 3 a.m.

In 2018, he was commissioned by An Lanntair and 14-18 Now to write new music to mark the centenary of the Iolaire. The piece is called Sàl (Saltwater) and was performed as part of the 2019 Celtic Connections festival and later released as a studio album in November 2019.

In July 2020, Morrison announced he was taking his music down from the streaming platforms Spotify and iTunes, stating on his website, “I’ve never thought it was a model that supported art, especially art on the fringes.” His music remains available to buy and stream through Bandcamp.

In December 2020 he released a collection of previously unreleased tracks, b-sides and home recordings called Pots and Pans, following it up with Pots and Pans Vol 2 in April 2024.

== Discography ==
=== Solo ===
- Empty Beer Bottles & Peat Fire Smoke (2004)
- Skimming Stones... Sinking Boats (2008)
- Trust the Sea to Guide Me (2010)
- To the Horizon, Sir (2012)
- Eas (2015)
- Amusement Arcade (2018)
- 3 A.M. (2018)
- Sàl (2019)
- Pots and Pans (2020)
- Pots and Pans Vol 2 (2024)

=== With poet Daibhidh Martin ===
- Haunted Bird (2011)

=== With Crash My Model Car ===
- Ghosts & Heights (2007)

=== With Poor Old Ben ===
- Drawing Faces to Forget (2003)

== Reviews ==
- The Glasgow Herald
- Folk Radio UK
- The Scotsman gig review
- Financial Times review
- The Herald Scotland
