= Salsa Celtica =

Scottish salsa music group

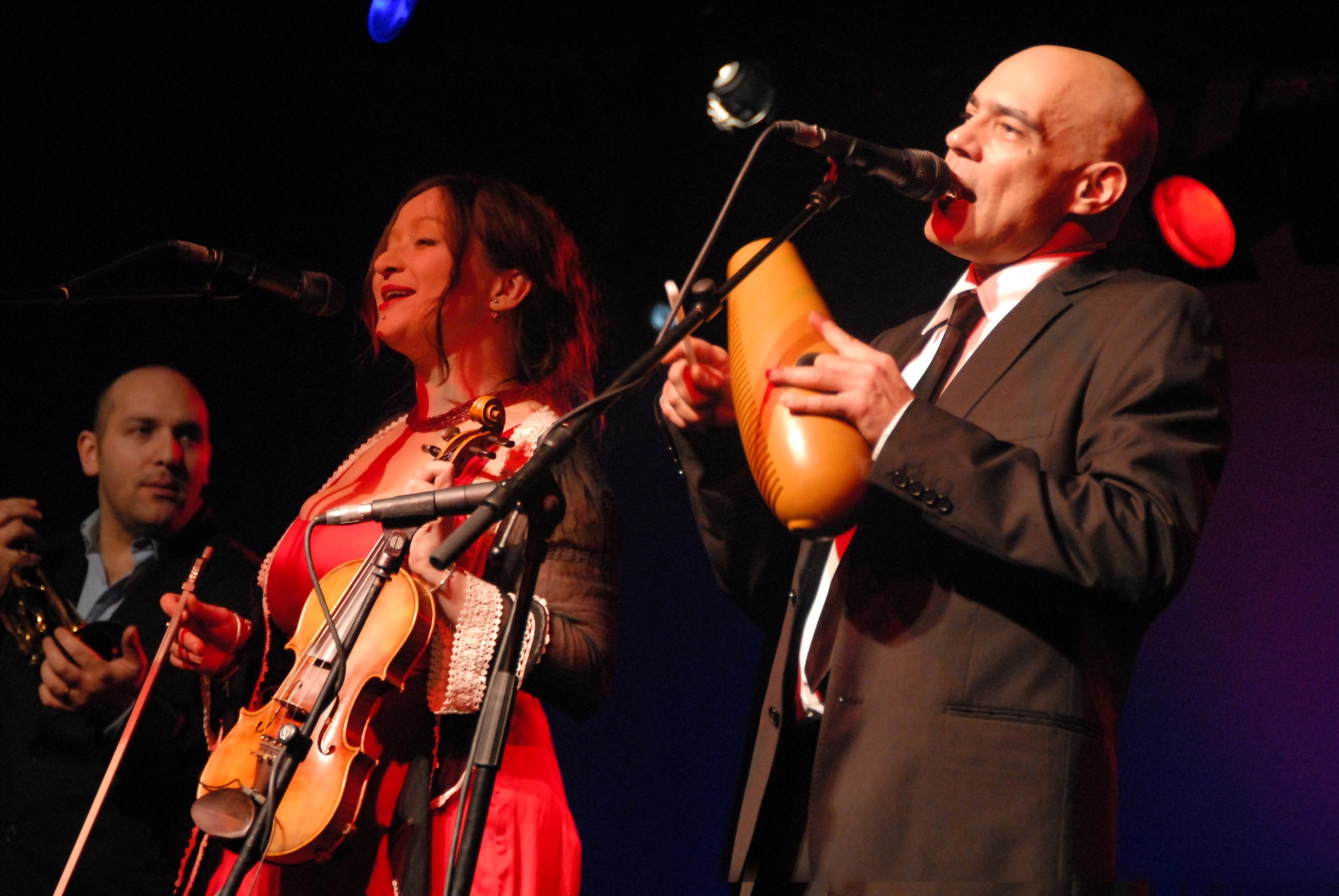
Salsa Celtica performing with Eliza Carthy in 2007

Salsa Céltica are a Scottish group that plays a fusion of salsa music with traditional Scottish instruments, including elements of folk and jazz.

== History ==
Salsa Céltica was formed in 1995 by Scottish jazz and folk musicians. In 1997 they visited Cuba to study and absorb the musical culture and influences of the country. Inspired by the trip they released their debut album Monstruos y Demonios, (Monsters and Demons) that same year. It went on to receive critical and popular acclaim.

Since the release of their first album, Salsa Celtica have toured most of Scotland, including the Hebrides from Iona to Orkney, as well as the rest of the United Kingdom and Ireland. They have played at numerous festivals, including T in the Park, Celtic Connections, the Hebridean Celtic Festival, The Highland Festival, Glastonbury Festival, Cambridge Folk Festival, Milwaukee Irish Fest (Milwaukee, WI, USA), Trowbridge Folk Festival, Celtic Fusion Festival and the Aberdeen, Cork, Dundee, Edinburgh, and Glasgow Jazz Festivals. They have toured Europe and North America as well as parts of South-East Asia.

In 1998, Salsa Celtica performed at Edinburgh's Hogmanay celebrations in front of 40,000 people: this was broadcast live on UK television. In 1999 the band returned to Cuba after being invited to appear in Havana and Santiago to work with Conjunto Folklorico de Cutumba.

In 2003, the band's third album El Agua De La Vida reached number 5 on the World Music Chart of Europe and number 24 in the end of year round-up 2003 World Music Chart for Europe. In 2004 the band toured the UK for the first time, including a headline performance at Queen Elizabeth Hall on London's South Bank.

Salsa Celtica have appeared on BBC Radio 2's folk programme The Mike Harding Show and BBC Radio 3's Andy Kershaw Show. The release of El Agua De La Vida in 2004 was also met with critical acclaim, including in the Evening Standard.

Salsa Celtica played in and on the soundtrack of the film Driving Lessons (2006), written and directed by Jeremy Brock, a coming-of-age story starring Rupert Grint, Laura Linney and Julie Walters.

In November 2006 the band were nominated for 2007 BBC Radio 2 Folk Awards in the "Best Traditional Song" category for their rendition of the traditional English song "The Grey Cockerel" sung as "The Grey Gallito" by guest vocalist Eliza Carthy.

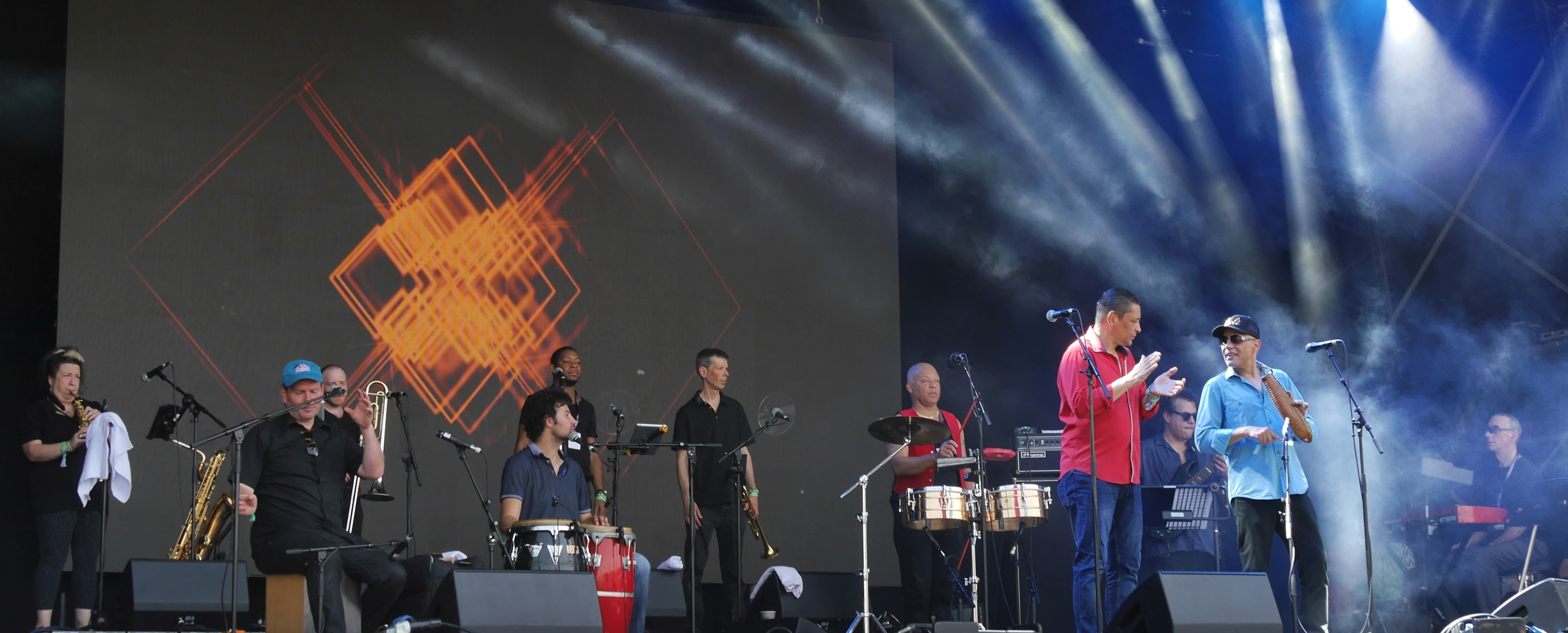
Grupo Magnetico, Glastonbury Festival, 2019

Members of Salsa Celtica and Rumba Caliente formed an 11-piece Latin soul orchestra, Grupo Magnético, including Toby Shippey, Angelica Lopez and Ricardo Fernandez Pompa. In 2018, they released an album, Positivo. In June 2019, they played at the Glastonbury Festival.

== Current members ==
- Ricardo Fernandez Pompa - lead vocals, percussion
- Simon Gall - piano
- Megan Henderson- fiddle, lead vocals
- Toby Shippey - bongos, cowbell
- Dougie "El Pulpo" Hudson - congas
- Sue McKenzie - saxophone
- Shanti Jayasinha - trumpet
- Phil O'Malley - trombone
- John Speirs- bass guitar
- Steve Kettley - saxophone
- Éamonn Coyne - banjo, tenor guitar
- Ross Ainslie - bagpipes, whistle, cittern
- Eric Alfonso - timbales

== Former members ==
- Martyn Bennett
- Galo Ceron-Carrasco
- Stevie Christie
- Jenny Gardner
- Steve Kettley
- Paul Harrison
- Andi Neate
- Lino Rocha - Lead vocal/composer

== Discography ==
- Monstruos y Demonios, Angels and Lovers (1997) Eclectic Records
- The Great Scottish Latin Adventure (2000) Greentrax Recordings
- El Agua de la Vida (2003) Greentrax Recordings
- El Camino (2006) Discos León
- En Vivo en el Norte - In Concert (2010) Discos León
- The Tall Islands (2014) Discos León
