= Spell Songs =

Folk ensemble

- Years active: 2019–present
- Members: Karine Polwart; Julie Fowlis; Seckou Keita; Kris Drever; Rachel Newton; Beth Porter; Jim Molyneux
- Past members: Kerry Andrew
- Website: www.thelostwords.org/spell-songs/

The Spell Songs ensemble is a group of folk musicians originally formed to complement the 2017 book The Lost Words by Robert Macfarlane and Jackie Morris.

== History ==
=== The Lost Words: Spell Songs ===
Their first album was commissioned by Folk by the Oak Festival in 2018, and was released in July 2019.

=== Spell Songs II: Let the Light In ===
Following a gathering of the ensemble at Greta Hall in the spring of 2021, Spell Songs II: Let The Light In was released in December, and reached number 1 on the UK Indie Breakers Chart in the same month.

=== Concerts ===
Jackie Morris paints along with the performances.
