= My Secret Is My Silence =

Studio album by Roddy Woomble
- Released: 24 July 2006
- Recorded: March 2006
- Studios: Pure, South Yorkshire
- Genre: Folk
- Length: 43:44
- Label: Pure
- Producer: John McCusker

Roddy Woomble chronology
My Secret Is My Silence (2006)	Before the Ruin (2008)

My Secret Is My Silence is the debut studio album by Idlewild lead vocalist Roddy Woomble, released 24 July 2006 on Pure Records.

The album, produced by John McCusker, features tracks co-written by McCusker, Rod Jones, Michael Angus and Karine Polwart, as well as the vocals of folk singer Kate Rusby.

== Background and recording ==
Between 1997 and 2005, Roddy Woomble released four studio albums with his band Idlewild, which toyed with grunge-lite punk rock to folk-inspired rock. Their latest album up to this point, Warnings/Promises (2005), also incorporated country elements, which a lot of the band's fans did not take to. Despite the album's favourable reception from music critics, it spent one week in the top ten of the UK Albums Chart, falling to number 39 the following week.

Idlewild had promoted it with a handful of acoustic shows; sometime after Woomble moved to the United States, living in New York City. Woomble opted to expand on the band's shift in style, focusing on his love for traditional Scottish folk music. My Secret Is My Silence was recorded at Pure Studios in South Yorkshire with McCusker as producer over nine days in March 2006. Woomble and other musicians lived in a farmhouse next to the studio. Andy Seward handled recording, while Joe rushby did additional engineering. Seward mixing the recordings, before the album was mastered by Calum Malcolm.

== Writing and composition ==
Woomble noted that My Secret Is My Silence was predominantly written inside his small flat in Glasgow following the Warnings/Promises period. He said that was a period of extensive touring and "record company pressure. I had a longing for wide open spaces, glens, rivers and trees, and to be rid of the trappings of a moderately successful major label rock band. So [the] record is all about escapism". He added that the "barriers were down so I could do whatever I wanted. I don't look at it as a solo record [...] it's more of a collaborative effort. There are ten people on it!". He co-wrote nearly all of the songs, bar "Whiskeyface", with Idlewild guitarist Rod Jones, McCusker, Michael Angus of Foxface and Karine Polwart; "Whiskeyface" is solely credited to McCusker. Woomble was surrounded by a variety of musicians playing various instruments, while he only did lead vocals. Angus, Ian Carr, Jones, McCusker and Polwart all contributed gtuiars, either acoustic or electric, while Woomble's wife Ailidh Lennon of Sons and Daughters played bass. Other instruments, such as drums, violin and organs, were played by Andy Cutting, David Gow, McCusker, Michael McGoldrick and Donald Shaw. Aiding Woomble on vocals, Angus, Dave Burland, Jones, Polwart and Kate Rusby sung on various tracks across the album.

AllMusic reviewer Tim DiGravina said the album had two sides to it: the "pensive, brittle ballads", such as "I Came In from the Mountain" and "If I Could Name Any Name", while "on the other hand midtempo to urgent storming tracks indistinguishable from Idlewild fare other than the presence of fiddles and folksy percussion in the place of electric guitars and distortion pedals". "I Came In from the Mountain" began as a more up-tempo song until Carr's guitar part altered its direction. McCusker said the first take of the song was the version they ended up using. With "As Still as I Watch Your Grave", Woomble said they attempted to evoke the work of Fairport Convention and Liege & Lief (1969), as it was a favourite of Woomble's, while its chorus sections were in the style of Idlewild. Jones said it started as an Idlewild song, only to be changed by the other musicians involved during the making of the album. "Every Line of a Long Moment" is about dreaming about islands while living in a city. "My Secret Is My Silence" has Woomble singing about his way home; him and McCusker were listening to the work of the Band while writing it, with Woomble picking lines from his notebooks.

Woomble said "Act IV" and "From the Drifter to the Drake" were "real band effort[s]" that were written in the studio. "If I Could Name Any Name" was one of a few songs that Woomble and Polwart had written at the latter's residence. Woomble thought it had a "nice Cat Stevens feel about it", and said he had the movie Harold and Maude (1971) when coming up with it. "Whiskeyface" is an instrumental that Woomble was initially as to where it would be placed on the album. They had recorded it late during one evening after consuming beer and wine. Discussing the title of "Waverley Steps", Woomble said it referred to a flight of stairs leading to Waverley railway station in Edinburgh, Scotland. He mentioned that it dealt with people making connections to locations and how those connections remain despite changes one goes through. Woomble compared "Under My Breath", which he wrote with Jones, to Idlewild, only with the addition of whistling and fiddle. For the album's closing song, "Play Me Something", Woomble wanted to involve all of the vocalists they had up to this point for a "big singalong". It ends with a short piece of music that they had recorded during the final day of the album's sessions.

== Release and reception ==
Professional ratings
Review scores
Source	Rating
AllMusic	4.5/5 stars
musicOMH	4/5 stars

On 25 May 2006, My Secret Is My Silence was announced for release in two months' time. Its eventual 24 July 2006 release was promoted with a tour of the United Kingdom, running into the following month. It reached number 92 in the UK. The album was released in the US through 7-10 Music in July 2007. Woomble celebrated the album's 10th anniversary with a celebratory show in 2016, where they he performed it in full.

My Secret Is My Silence was met with generally favourable reviews from music critics. DiGravina said Woomble was "in fine voice, and Rusby's gentle tone" acts as a good counterpoint to it. He added that the "fragile but certain solo outing will please old and new fans alike". Chris Long of BBC Music wrote that the vocals harmonies from Rusby, "along with the production and violin of her husband John McCusker, that make the solid bed to build his beautiful songs on".

musicOMH contributor Neil Jones thought the musicians backing Woomble "are being taken for the ride of their lives", using Rusby's vocals as an example that her "contribution sounds nothing less than subtly breathtaking". The Living Tradition writer Dave Beeby felt that "each track [has] something which demands you listen," save for one song. He explained that it was a "real class album which should not be judged on genre but on the strength of the music". Barbara Mitchell for NPR said the album's title-track summed up the album well: "Buoyed by plaintive strings and wrapped in a sparse arrangement, his words connect the past and future, history and dreams, silence and secrets".

== Track listing ==
Writing credits per booklet.

No.	Title	Writer(s)	Length
1.	"I Came In from the Mountain"	Roddy Woomble; Rod Jones	2:40
2.	"As Still as I Watch Your Grave"	Woomble; Jones	4:45
3.	"Every Line of a Long Moment"	Woomble; Jones	3:39
4.	"My Secret Is My Silence"	Woomble; John McCusker	4:12
5.	"Act IV"	Woomble; Michael Angus	4:22
6.	"From the Drifter to the Drake"	Woomble; Angus	3:37
7.	"If I Could Name Any Name"	Woomble; Karine Polwart	3:57
8.	"Whiskeyface"	McCusker	2:47
9.	"Waverley Steps"	Woomble; Jones	4:05
10.	"Under My Breath"	Woomble; Jones	3:44
11.	"Play Me Something"	Woomble; McCusker	3:40

== Personnel ==
Personnel per booklet.

Musicians

- Michael Angus – acoustic guitar (tracks 4 and 9), electric guitar (tracks 5 and 6), vocals (tracks 6)
- Dave Burland – vocals (tracks 4, 6 and 11)
- Ian Carr – acoustic guitar (tracks 1, 8 and 11), lead electric guitar (tracks 2 and 10)
- Andy Cutting – accordion (tracks 1, 2, 8, 10 and 11)
- David Gow – drums, percussion (tracks 2–6 and 8–11)
- Rod Jones – acoustic guitar (tracks 3 and 4), electric guitar (tracks 2–6 and 8–11), vocals (tracks 2–7 and 9–11)
- Ailidh Lennon – bass guitar (tracks 2–6 and 8–11)
- Michael McGoldrick – flute (tracks 2, 8, 10 and 11), whistle (tracks 5), uilleann pipes (tracks 2, 6 and 11)
- John McCusker – violin (tracks 2–5, 8 and 10), cittern (tracks 6, 9 and 11), tenor guitar (tracks 7), Wurlitzer (track 3)
- Karine Polwart – acoustic guitar (track 7), vocals (tracks 2, 4, 6, 7 and 11)
- Kate Rusby – vocals (tracks 1, 5, 6, 9 and 11)
- Donald Shaw – harmonium (tracks 5, 7 and 9), Wurlitzer (tracks 3 and 7)
- Roddy Woomble – lead vocals (tracks all songs)

Production and design

- John McCusker – producer
- Andy Seward – recording, mixing
- Joe Rushby – additional engineer
- Calum Malcolm – mastering
- David Gillanders – cover photograph
- Ailidh Lennon – drawing
- Bryan Ledgard – design, artwork

== Charts ==
Chart performance for My Secret Is My Silence
Chart (2006)	Peak position
UK Albums (Official Charts)	92
