= New Voices (Celtic Connections musical commission) =

List of New Voices commissions by the Celtic Connections festival

- Description: Musical commission for emerging composers
- Location: Glasgow
- Country: Scotland
- Presented by: Celtic Connections festival
- Website: www.celticconnections.com

New Voices is an award for emerging composers made by the Celtic Connections festival annually since 1998. It is a musical commission which enables recipients to compose and perform a significant new suite of music of about forty-five minutes, based on traditional themes. Usually there are three commissions each year, with each composer performing their work at a lunchtime concert on one of the three Sundays of the festival. The funding provides for the musician both to develop the work, and to direct its performance, typically by five to ten musicians, at its première. In the earlier years, the composer was invited to further develop the work and revisit it at the festival the next year, but this is no longer practised.

The selection process for the commissions is informal. Sometimes a musician may approach the festival with an idea for a new work, other times festival director Donald Shaw proposes participation to a musician he thinks would benefit and create something worthwhile.

Various sponsors have supported New Voices over the years. In 2020 the awards were sponsored by the Scottish edition of The Times and Sunday Times, and the composers were Marit Fält, Pàdruig Morrison and Catriona Price.

== New Voices commissions ==
All of the concerts were premières unless otherwise noted.

year	composer	title of composition	notes and references
2025	Michael Biggins		
2025	Ciorstaidh Beaton		
2025	Ciaran Ryan		
2024	Alice Allen	Bass Culture	
2024	Ali Levack		
2024	Charlie Grey		
2023	Beth Malcolm	By Process of Folkmosis	
2023	Malin Lewis	Halocline	
2023	Eric Linklater	Out in the Flow	
2022	Jack Badcock	Life in Three Dimensions	
2022	Esther Swift	Emergence	
2022	Ross Couper		
2021	Charlie Stewart		
2021	Josie Duncan		
2021	Steven Blake		
2020	Marit Fält	Irrationalities	
2020	Pàdruig Morrison		
2020	Catriona Price		
2019	Gráinne Brady	Beyond: The Story of an Irish Immigrant	
2019	Mischa Macpherson	Bho Èirigh gu Laighe na Grèine (Sun | Moon | Land | Life | Sea)	First commissioned for the 2018 Blas Festival.
2019	Megan Henderson		
2018	Sarah-Jane Summers	Owerset	Reprised at the 2020 festival.
2018	Innes White		
2018	Ailie Robertson	Seven Sorrows	
2017	Seán Grey	The Hammering Tongue	
2017	Hannah Fisher	Around this View	
2017	Freya Thomsen	Community and Stardust	
2016	Hamish Napier	The River	Released as a CD in 2016.
2016	Ewan Robertson	Transitions	
2016	Kate Young	Umbelliferae	
2015	Graham Mackenzie	Crossing Borders	Later released as a CD.
2015	Ross Ainslie	Remembering	
2015	Siobhan Wilson	The Great Eye	Wilson performed as "Ella the Bird".
2014	Sarah Hayes	Woven	
2014	Lorne MacDougall	Collisions	
2014	Rachel Newton	Changeling	Released as a CD later in 2014.
2013 (Note: The third New Voices slot in 2013 was used for a double bill of the commissions by Angus Lyon and Duncan Lyall from the previous two years.)	Rona Wilkie	Ceangailte (Connected)	
2013	Sorren Maclean	Winter Stay Autumn	
2012	Duncan Lyall	Infinite Reflections	Reprised at the 2013 festival.
2012	Fiona Rutherford	Sleep Sound	
2012	Laura-Beth Salter	Breathe	
2011	Angus Lyon	3G	Reprised at the 2013 festival.
2011	Rachel Sermanni	Tramping	
2011	Innes Watson	The Glasgow Guitar Colloquium	
2010	Iain Morrison	Ceol Mor/Little Music	
2010	Mike Vass	String Theory	
2010	Lori Watson	Sanctuary	
2009	Rick Taylor	The Call of the Wild	
2009	Griogair Labhruidh	Fear-ealaidh	
2009	Mairearad Green	Passing Places	Released as live CD, and also a DVD of a journey through Wester Ross in music and film.
2008	Gavin Marwick	Journeyman	
2008	Catriona McKay	Flöe	
2008	Patsy Reid	Bridging the Gap	
2007	Nuala Kennedy	Astar: Journey	
2007	Kris Drever		
2007	Calum MacCrimmon	Outside the Circle	
2006	Martin Green	First Sighting	
2006	Anna-Wendy Stevenson	My Edinburgh	
2006	Fraser Stone & Paul Jennings	JSP Voyager	
2005	Anna Massie		
2005	Christine Hanson	The Cremation of Sam McGee	
2005	James Ross	An Cuan (The Ocean)	
2004	Maggie MacInnes	Òran na Mnà (A Woman's Song)	
2004	Adam Sutherland		
2004	Jennifer Port	Silver Lining	
2003	Gillian Frame	Kinship Theory	Reprised at the 2004 festival.
2003	Aidan O'Rourke	Sirius	Reprised at the 2004 festival, and released as an album.
2003	Tom Richardson		
2002	Finlay MacDonald		
2002	Alyth McCormack		
2002	Mary Macmaster	Three Days	
2001	Fraser Fifield	Traditions (for saxophone quintet)	Reprised at the 2002 festival.
2001	Chris Stout		
2001	Wendy Weatherby	Daybreak on the World's Edge	Reprised at the 2002 festival.
2000	Rory Campbell	Purely Whistles	
2000	Phamie Gow	Lammermuir	A live recording of this concert was released as a CD in 2002. The work was reprised at the 2020 festival.
2000	Colin Reid	Icarus	Reprised at the 2001 festival.
1999	Andy Thorburn	Tuath gu Deas (North and South)	Reprised at the millennial (2000) festival, together with a new work by Thorburn called Heartful of Friendship. Reprised again at the 2013 festival.
1999	Karen Marshalsay	Journeying	Reprised at the millennial (2000) festival, together with a new work by Marshalsay, called Promise to Keep.
1999	Karen Wimhurst	The Stones and the Sea	Performed by the Cauld Blast Orchestra. Commissioned by An Tobar and the Highlands Festival, and premiered in May 1998 at the An Tobar Arts Centre, Isle of Mull.
1998	Corrina Hewat	Making the Connection	Reprised at the millennial (2000) festival.
1998	David Milligan	Lifting the Lid	Reprised at the millennial (2000) festival.
1998	Simon Thoumire	Celtic Connections Suite	First presented at Celtic Connections 1997 as a stand-alone commission. Also reprised at the millennial (2000) festival, together with a new work by Thoumire called Scottish Requiem.
