= Corrina Hewat =

Scottish harpist, singer, and composer (born 1970)

- Born: 21 December 1970 (age 55); Edinburgh, Scotland
- Genres: Celtic music, folk music
- Occupations: Musician, composer
- Instruments: Vocals, harp
- Formerly of: Chantan; Shine; Grace Hewat Polwart; Bachué; the Unusual Suspects

Corrina Hewat (born 21 December 1970) is a Scottish folk harpist, singer, and composer.

== Early life, education, and personal life ==
Hewat was born in Edinburgh on 21 December 1970 as the eldest of two children to Caroline (1949–2015), an artist, musician, and arts activist, and Alan, a teacher who was also musically inclined. In 1979, when she was about eight, she moved with her family to the Black Isle in the Scottish Highlands when her father took up a job as an English teacher at Alness Academy. During her childhood her family hosted "Kitchen Cèilidhs" at their home where locals would come to play music and tell stories. As a child she studied piano and fiddle, before taking up the Celtic harp (Clarsach) at the age of 12. Using a harp hired from the Clarsach Society, she took about a year of lessons from Christine Martin, a violinist who also played harp. Martin provided the lessons free of charge until she had taught Hewat all she knew about the instrument. While studying high school at Fortrose Academy, she continued teaching herself the harp and attended her first Edinburgh International Harp Festival in the mid-1980s along with Fèis Rois Traditional Weekends. At this time her mentors included Patsy Seddon, Mary Macmaster, Alison Kinnaird, and Savourna Stevenson.

After finishing high school, she spent a year studying classical pedal harp at the Royal Scottish Academy of Music and Drama (now the Royal Conservatoire of Scotland) with Sanchia Pielou, who was the principal harpist of the BBC Scottish Symphony Orchestra from its founding in 1935 until 1980. Hewat had originally wanted to study drama at the Academy but was a year too young for their course in that subject. Feeling restricted by classical music, she dropped out and took a gap year. She then began studying for a degree in jazz and contemporary music on both the pedal and Celtic harp at the Leeds College of Music (now the Leeds Conservatoire). During her first year, she encountered difficulties with her assigned pedal harp teacher, who ultimately left the course. As a result, she received no harp instruction that year. At the end of the year, she informed the college of her intention to leave due to the lack of teaching, prompting the institution to arrange for her to make up the missed lessons and allowing her to choose a new instructor for the remainder of her studies. She selected the Irish harpist Máire Ní Chathasaigh, who lived within driving distance of the college. Hewat graduated with honours in 1993 as the first harpist to take the course. While studying at Leeds she met her future husband, David Milligan, a jazz pianist, with whom she played in an extracurricular jazz-funk band. They have a daughter.

== Career ==
Hewat began her professional career in 1994, performing solo harp at the first Celtic Connections festival. The next year, on the encouragement of the festival director, she launched her duo with Milligan, Bachué (then Bachué Café) at the festival and began performing publicly as a singer. Bachué was active until 2006 and came to include Donald Hay (drums) and Colin Steele (trumpet). In 2003, Hewat and Milligan founded the Usual Suspects (which they co-directed), a folk big band with a horn section. Hewat has also been in the all-woman trios Chantan (1995–1998), a vocal trio with Christine Kydd & Elspeth Cowie; Shine (1999–2003 and 2015), a vocal and electric harp group with Mary Macmaster and Alyth McCormack; and Grace Hewat Polwart, a vocal harmony trio with Karine Polwart and Annie Grace that they have described as a "girly trio", along with a duo with Kathryn Tickell. At the 2008 BBC Proms, she performed with Bella Hardy at London's Royal Albert Hall as part of the first Folk Prom.

Having composed music since her childhood, she has written several works under commission, the first being the Song of Wrenching (1996), a 22-minute work for ten musicians written for the Highland Festival. She composed "Making the Connection" for the 1998 Celtic Connections festival, part of a series that became known as New Voices. In 2003, Silhouettes, a song cycle for six voices she wrote for the Dunedin Consort that incorporates words and poems by EE Cummings and Judith Jardine, was first performed. In 2011, a four-movement composition she wrote for six harpists pplaying on ten harps of various types, The Song of Oak and Ivy (originally known as The Song of the Oak and the Ivy), was premiered at the Edinburgh International Harp Festival by Hewat, Heather Downie, Wendy Stewart, Mary Macmaster, Bill Taylor, and Tristan Le Govic. Written to celebrate the 30th anniversary of that festival along with the 80th anniversary of the Clarsach Society, it was inspired by the children's short story "The Oak Tree and the Ivy" from A Little Book of Profitable Tales by the 19th-century American writer Eugene Field. The composition was subsequently performed at the 2011 Edinburgh Festival Fringe, along with Celtic Connections and the Festival Interceltique de Lorient in 2012. The piece evolved over the years, with a performance at the 2025 Celtic Connections festival being followed by the release of a studio recording of Songs of Oak and Ivy, with the harpists from the 2011 premier as well as Milligan on piano.

Hewat has taught harp at Newcastle University and also the Royal Conservatoire of Scotland from 2012 to 2022. She has made educational books and videos about the instrument. She has directed Sangstream, a Scots folk music community choir in Edinburgh, from 2015 to 2018 and since late 2020, and has previously directed Health in Harmony, a choir for health workers.

== Awards ==
- 1995: BBC Radio 2 Young Tradition Award (finalist)
- 2013: Music Tutor of the Year, Scots Trad Music Awards

== Discography ==
=== As leader or co-leader ===
As sole leader

- Photons in Vapour (2000), with Light Music
- My Favourite Place (2003), with David Milligan (piano), Karine Polwart (vocals), and Donald Hay (drums)
- Silhouette (2003), with the Dunedin Consort
- Harp I do (2008), solo harp album
- Song of Oak and Ivy (2025), EP, with Hewat, Heather Downie, Wendy Stewart, Mary Macmaster, Bill Taylor, and Tristan Le Govic (all on harp), along with David Milligan (piano)

With Bachué

- Bachue Café (1996)
- A Certain Smile (1999)
- The Butterfly (2004)

With the Unusual Suspects

- Live In Scotland (2004)
- Big Like This (2014)

With Chantan

- Primary Colours (1997)

With Shine

- Sugarcane (2001)
- Fire and Frost (2015), EP

With Kathryn Tickell

- The Sky Didn't Fall (2006)

=== Selected collaborations ===
With Bella Hardy

- Night Visiting (2007)
- In the Shadow of Mountains (2009)
- Songs Lost & Stolen (2011)

With Karine Polwart

- Faultlines (2004)
- Scribbled in Chalk (2006)
- A Pocket of Wind Resistance (2017, with Pippa Murphy)

'Other artists (in chronological order)

- Lau: Arc Light (2011)
- Julienne Taylor: The Heart Within (2011)
- Alasdair Roberts and Robin Robertson: Hirta Songs (2013)
- Rachel Newton: Changeling (2014)
- Martin Green: Flit (2016)
