= This Earthly Spell =

Studio album by Karine Polwart
- Released: 10 March 2008
- Genre: Folk
- Label: Hegri Music

Karine Polwart chronology
| Fairest Floo'er (2007) | This Earthly Spell (2008) | Traces (2012) |

This Earthly Spell is the fourth studio album by Scottish folk musician Karine Polwart, released on 10 March 2008. The album was released just three months after Fairest Floo'er, and contains original compositions.

"The Good Years" previously appeared on Ballads of the Book. "Firethief" was originally written for and appeared in The Radio Ballads 2006.

"Rivers Run" was also issued as a one-track promo CD to publicise the album.

== Track listing ==
All songs by Karine Polwart, except where noted.

1. "The Good Years" (Polwart/Edwin Morgan)
2. "Sorry"
3. "Better Things"
4. "Rivers Run"
5. "Painted It White"
6. "Firethief"
7. "Behind Our Eyes"
8. "The News"
9. "Sorrowlessfield" (Karine Polwart / Steven Polwart)
10. "Tongue That Cannot Lie"

== Personnel ==
- Karine Polwart: acoustic and tenor guitar, lead vocals, shruti box
- Steven Polwart: acoustic and electric guitars, banjo, vocals
- Kevin McGuire: double bass, electric bass, vocals
- Mattie Foulds: drums, percussion, vocals
- Inge Thomson: accordion, bass melodica, kalimba, triangle, vocals
- Martin Green: Hammond, loop station, Moog, Wurlitzer

== Charts ==
Chart performance for This Earthly Spell
| Chart (2008) | Peak position |
|---|---|
| Scottish Albums (Official Charts) | 33 |
| UK Albums (Official Charts) | 94 |
| UK Independent Albums (Official Charts) | 10 |
