= Bella Hardy =

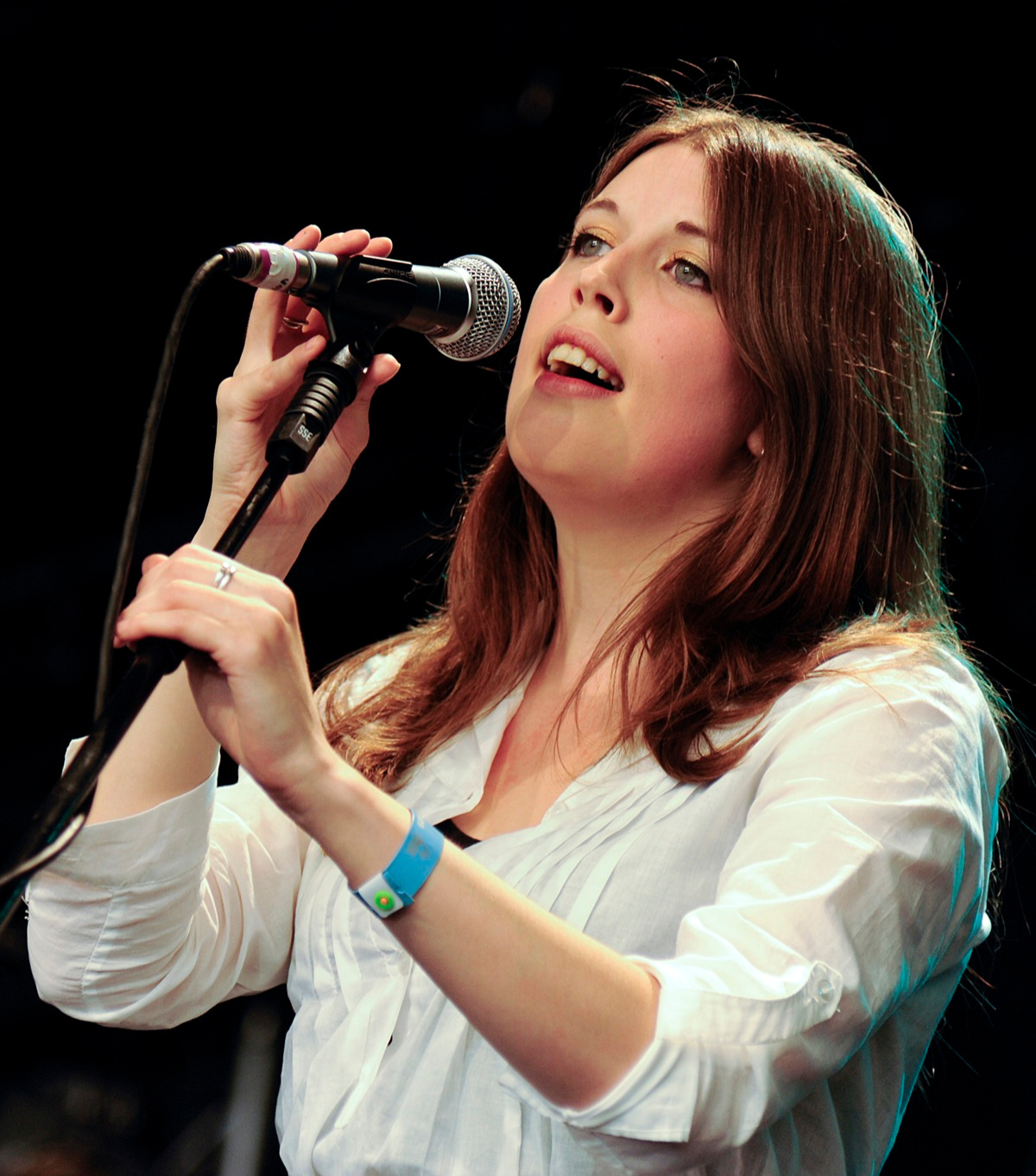
- Hardy in 2009

Background information
- Born: 24 May 1984 (age 42)
- Origin: Edale, Derbyshire, England
- Genres: Folk
- Occupations: Musician, singer, songwriter
- Instrument: Fiddle
- Label: Noe Records
- Website: www.bellahardy.com

Bella Hardy (born 24 May 1984) is an English contemporary folk musician, singer and songwriter from Edale, Derbyshire, England, who performs a combination of traditional and self-penned material. She was named Folk Singer of the Year at the 2014 BBC Radio 2 Folk Awards, having previously won the award for Best Original Song in 2012 for "The Herring Girl".

== Education ==
Hardy attended Edale CE Primary School and Hope Valley College and earned a Bachelor of Arts degree in English literature from York St John University in 2005 and a Master of Music degree from the University of Newcastle in 2007. She was named the inaugural "Alum of the Year" by York St John University in 2009.

== Career ==
Bella Hardy is from Edale in Derbyshire's Dark Peak where there is an abundance of communal song. Born into a family of singers, Hardy began singing locally at an early age. Having played the fiddle a small amount at school, she attended a Folkworks Youth Summer School in Durham aged 13. Motivated by the number of young people playing folk music, she began working on folk fiddle. In 2004 she was a finalist in BBC Radio 2's Young Folk as a solo artist.

Hardy released her debut solo album Night Visiting in 2007, to critical acclaim. Mojo gave her a 4* 'Brilliant' rating, fRoots wrote "Bella Hardy is more than a new generation folk revivalist... Her potential is massive", and Taplas Magazine noted "...her debut CD solo album is a piece of wondrous beauty and inventive incisiveness". The following year she was nominated for the Horizon Award at the BBC Radio 2 Folk Awards. She was also nominated for Best Original Song the same year with Three Black Feathers, which Jim Moray went on to record on his 2008 album Low Culture.

In July 2008 she performed in two concerts at London's Royal Albert Hall as part of the first Folk Prom, part of the BBC Proms. She opened the event with a set of unaccompanied traditional songs and played an evening concert with long-time touring companions Chris Sherburn (concertina) and Corrina Hewat (harp). The programme was broadcast simultaneously by BBC Four and Radio 3. Other TV appearances include The Truth about Carols (2008), a Christmas Day BBC Two show on which she sang 'The Coventry Carol', and BBC One's Songs of Praise in February 2010 singing her own version of 'The Lord's my Shepherd'.

Hardy released her second solo album In The Shadow of Mountains in 2009 at the Cambridge Folk Festival. Again it gained critical acclaim. English Dance and Song Magazine wrote "It's astounding and somewhat daunting to realise this is only Bella's second album... Surely no-one has any right to be writing songs with the sophistication of 'Sylvie Sovay', so early in their career...lyrical portraiture that brings to mind no less than Lennon and McCartney", and R2 Magazine noted "Bella's debut album Night Visiting was excellent, but In The Shadow of Mountains is stunning".

Hardy has released a total of nine solo records. She has also collaborated on a number of projects, including Carthy, Hardy, Farrell, & Young with Eliza Carthy, and The Elizabethan Session with John Smith and Martin Simpson. In 2015, Hardy was British Council Musician in Residence in Yunnan, China, where she returned in 2017 to create the album Eternal Spring.

On 17 June 2019, she appeared on the podcast Trees A Crowd with David Oakes – for which Hardy also composed the theme tune.

In 2023, Hardy was named Kaleidoscope Choir Leader by the Buxton International Festival.

== Discography ==
Solo:

- Night Visiting (Noe Records, 2007)
- In The Shadow of Mountains (Noe Records, 2009)
- Songs Lost & Stolen (Navigator Records, 2011)
- The Dark Peak and The White (Noe Records, 2012)
- Bright Morning Star (Noe Records, 2012)
- Battleplan (Noe Records, 2013)
- With the Dawn (Noe Records, 2015)
- Eternal Spring (2017)
- Hey Sammy (Noe Records, 2017)
- Postcards & Pocketbooks: The Best of Bella Hardy (Noe Records, 2019)

Other:

- Twelve Little Devils The Pack (Selwyn Music, 2002)
- Be Prepared for Weather Ola (Ola Music, 2003)
- Laylam Carthy Hardy Farrell Young (Hem Hem Records, 2013)
- performs on The Liberty to Choose: Songs from the New Penguin Book of English Folk Songs Various Artists (Fellside Recordings Ltd, 2013)
- The Elizabethan Session (Quercus Records, 2014)

== Awards ==
- Best original song BBC Radio 2 Folk Awards (2012) – 'The Herring Girl'
- Folk singer of the year BBC Radio 2 Folk Awards (2014)

== Award nominations ==
- Horizon Award BBC Radio 2 Folk Awards (2009)
- Horizon Award BBC Radio 2 Folk Awards (2008)
- Best Original Song BBC Radio 2 Folk Awards (2008)
- Best Album (In The Shadow of Mountains) Spiral Awards (2010)
