= Karine Polwart =

Scottish folk singer (b. 1970)

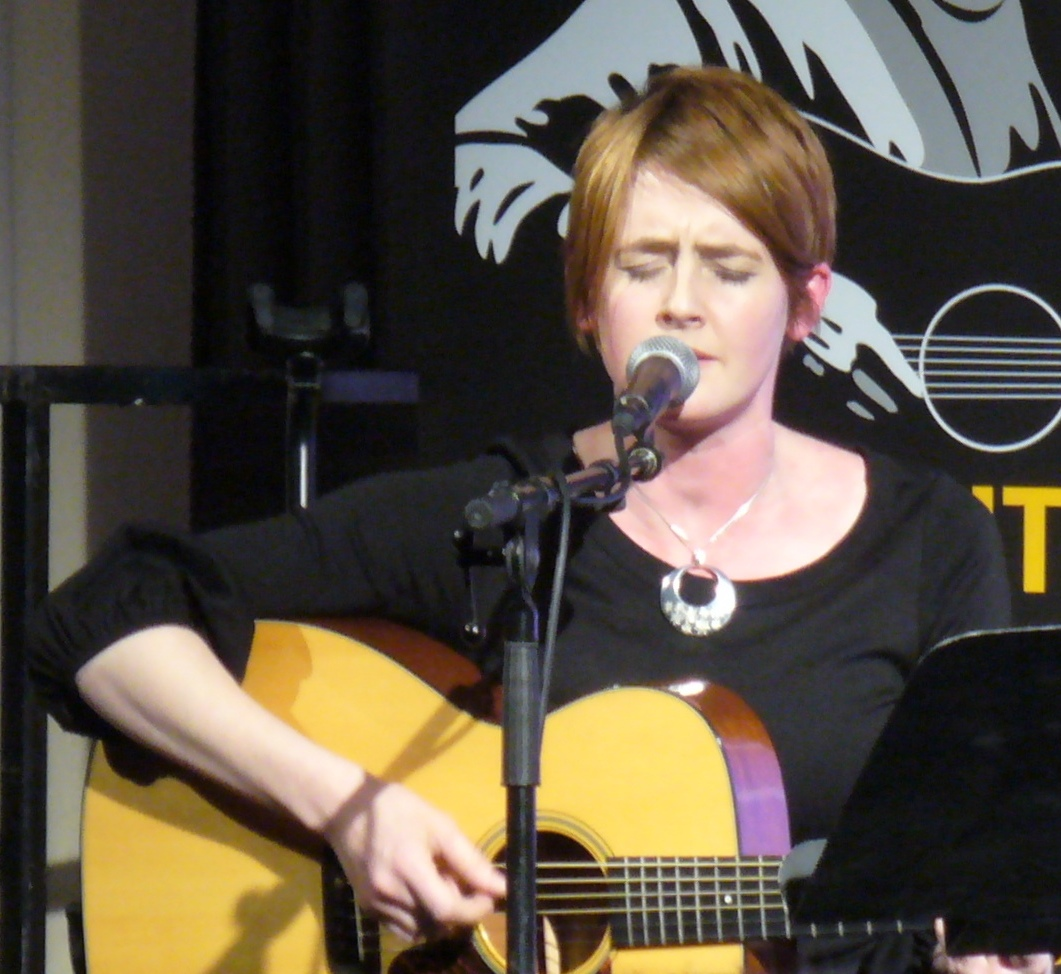
- Polwart performing at the Tribute to Alistair Hulett concert at Celtic Connections, 28 January 2011

Background information
- Born: 23 December 1970 (age 55)
- Origin: Banknock, Falkirk, Scotland
- Genre: Folk
- Occupations: Singer-songwriter and musician, theatre-maker, spoken-word performer
- Years active: 2000–present
- Label: Hegri Music (licensed to Shoeshine Records)
- Formerly of: The Burns Unit, Malinky, The Poems
- Website: www.karinepolwart.com

Karine Polwart (/kæˈriːn ˈpɒlwɔːrt/ ka-REEN POL-wort) (born 23 December 1970) is a Scottish singer-songwriter. She writes and performs music with a strong folk and roots feel, her songs dealing with a variety of issues from alcoholism to genocide. She has been most recognised for her solo career, winning three awards at the BBC Folk Awards in 2005, and was previously a member of Malinky and Battlefield Band.

Polwart was, until they split amicably in 2012, a member of The Burns Unit. She also collaborated with The Fruit Tree Foundation on its debut album, First Edition.

== Biography ==
=== Early life and career ===
Polwart was born and grew up in the small Stirlingshire town of Banknock and had an interest in music from an early age. She has described her whole family as being interested in music. One of her brothers is also a professional musician who plays guitar in the Karine Polwart band, whilst her sister is developing her own musical career with the group The Poems.

Despite an active musical career from a young age, including forming her own band KP and the Minichips at age 10, Polwart was discouraged from studying music at school and ended up studying politics and philosophy at the University of Dundee. After graduating with a First Class Degree in Philosophy Polwart moved to Glasgow to study for a Masters in Philosophical Inquiry.

Her first job after her studies was as a philosophy tutor in a primary school, a job she describes as giving her a "massive buzz." After this she spent six years working for the Scottish Women's Aid movement on issues such as domestic and child abuse and young people's rights and these experiences have influenced her songwriting.

=== Music career: 2000 to 2005 ===
Polwart initially gained prominence as lead singer of the group Malinky. With the release of their debut album Last Leaves in January 2000, Polwart left her job to concentrate on her musical career. After successful periods with Malinky, macAlias and Battlefield Band, and contributions to three volumes (Volumes 7, 8 and 9) of Linn Records' The Complete Songs of Robert Burns project, she decided to embark on a solo career. In 2003 she released her first solo album, Faultlines. Written and recorded with assistance from the Scottish Arts Council, Faultlines won the Best Album award at the 2005 BBC Radio 2 Folk Awards. This award, along with 2 others at the same ceremony, increased Polwart's profile not just in the folk community but also in the wider musical arena.

The songs on Faultlines cover a variety of topics, and although she has claimed at live performances that they are all quite depressing, many have an uplifting aspect. This is particularly evident in "The Sun's Comin' Over The Hill" (which won Best Original Song at the BBC Folk Awards 2005) which tells the story of a woman who reacts to the death of her partner through a period of depression, drink and drugs, but has a more optimistic chorus, with the narrator foreseeing an end to this period. There are exceptions to this: "Waterlily" — the tale of a man whose lover is killed during the war in Yugoslavia, based on the book Cold Night Lullaby by Colin Mackay — offers no such comfort. "Only One Way", on the other hand, is an upbeat song with a strong political theme and some biting humour.

=== From 2006 to 2011 ===
In April 2006, Polwart released her second solo album Scribbled in Chalk. This album was heralded with much critical acclaim receiving impressive reviews from amongst others, The Scotsman, The Independent on Sunday. A UK wide tour followed as well as appearances on BBC 2's Culture Show, Simon Mayo's Album show on Radio 2, Mike Harding's folk show on Radio 2, BBC Radio Scotland on the Janice Forsyth show and the Janice Long Late show on Radio 2.

Like Faultlines, Scribbled in Chalk often looks at the darker side of life with tales of sex trafficking ("Maybe there's a Road"), the holocaust ("Baleerie Baloo", which is about the missionary Jane Haining) and the uncertainties of life ("Hole in the Heart"). But these stories of despair are balanced by others that describe the joy of a slower life ("Take Its Own Time"), of hope triumphing over cynicism ("Where the Smoke Blows") and the wonder of the universe ("Terminal Star").

According to her official website, she believes that songs should stand up by themselves. However, for the sake of those interested in the backstory behind the songs, the website provides information about each of them on the basis that even if a song does work by itself, sometimes the story behind it can make it more meaningful. She has also made guitar tablature available for several of her songs through her website, including notes on tuning and style.

As well as her solo work, Polwart spent much of 2006 collaborating with other artists on a variety of projects; Roddy Woomble, the lead singer of Idlewild, asked her to help co-write and provide backing vocals for his solo album, My Secret Is My Silence, whilst Polwart provided several original songs for the BBC Radio 2 music/social documentary series The Radio Ballads. Two of these songs, "Can't Weld A Body" and "Firethief", would later appear on her albums Fairest Floo'er and This Earthly Spell respectively. Polwart also supported The Beautiful South on their tour and she guested with David Knopfler at The Globe Theatre for a charity benefit for Reprieve.

At the 2006, Hogmanay Live celebrations on BBC Scotland, Polwart played several of her songs and also dueted with Paolo Nutini. Toward the end of the year, she became one of the founder members of a genre-crossing musical collective called The Burns Unit, which has since performed at festivals. The other members are Sushil K. Dade, Emma Pollock, Chris Difford, Kenny Anderson, singer Kim Edgar, pianist Michael Johnston and rap artist MC Soom T. The collective issued its debut album, Side Show, in August 2010.

In 2007, Polwart playing once again at Celtic Connections both with her band and collaborating with other artists including Dick Gaughan and Roddy Woomble. She took time off from live performance during 2007 as she was pregnant with her first child. During this time she recorded two albums: Fairest Floo'er comprising mostly traditional songs, and This Earthly Spell, containing only original compositions. Polwart also sings with Corrina Hewat and Annie Grace in, what they describe as, a "girly trio."

In March 2009, Polwart took part in the Darwin Song Project, a multi-artist songwriting retreat organised by the Shrewsbury Folk Festival to create songs that had a 'resonance and relevance' to Darwin. A CD was released in August 2009.

Polwart's website announced in February 2010 that she intends to take a year's "maternity leave" (Polwart's daughter, Rosa, was born on 1 April 2010) but will perform with the Burns Unit in the summer. She also recorded an EP with Lau which was released through her website in July 2010.

In 2011, she sang Robert Burns haunting "Now Westlin' Winds" with Kirsty Grace at the Royal Opening of the Scottish Parliament by Her Majesty Queen Elizabeth II.

=== Since 2012 ===
Polwart released her fifth studio album, Traces, in August 2012, to a strongly positive critical response. It became her first official UK Top 75 entry, entering the albums chart at number 57. The album included a new recording of "We're All Leaving" (previously recorded as part of the Darwin Song Project) and nine new songs, including tracks inspired by the Occupy London protests ("King of Birds") and Donald Trump's contested golf course development in Aberdeenshire ("Cover Your Eyes").

Polwart releases music through her own Hegri Music imprint, named from the Gaelic word for heron. Polwart describes the heron as her favourite animal and her song "Follow the Heron", which she has recorded both solo (on the Scribbled in Chalk album) and with Malinky (on the 3 Ravens album), has been much covered by artists including The McCalmans, Robert Lawrence and Cathie Ryan. The CD booklet for Polwart's Scribbled in Chalk includes a heron hidden in one of Sarah Roberts' illustrations.

Karine Polwart is a supporter of Scottish independence, and campaigned on behalf of the Scottish Green Party in the 2014 referendum. She also appeared, alongside other commentators, in the 2014 documentary film Scotland Yet, due to her involvement with the Bus Party 2014.

Steven Polwart, Karine Polwart and Inge Thomson performing in 2008

== Band members ==
- Karine Polwart - vocals, guitar
- Steven Polwart - acoustic and electric guitars, backing vocals
- Inge Thomson - accordion, backing vocals, percussion

== Discography ==
=== Solo work ===
==== Albums ====
- Faultlines (2004)
- Scribbled in Chalk (2006)
- Fairest Floo'er (2007)
- This Earthly Spell (2008)
- Traces (2012)
- A Pocket of Wind Resistance (2017) (with Pippa Murphy)
- Laws of Motion (2018) (with Steven Polwart & Inge Thomson)
- Karine Polwart's Scottish Songbook (2019)
- Still as Your Sleeping (2021) (with Dave Milligan)

==== Compilations ====
- Threshold (2013 - released in Canada only; contains tracks from the first four studio albums above and "Medusa" from The Build-Your-Own-Cathedral EP)

==== Singles and EPs ====
- "The Pulling Through EP" - lead track "Holy Moses" (2005)
- "Daisy" (2006)
- "I'm Gonna Do It All" (2006)
- "The-Build-Your-Own-Cathedral-EP" - lead track "Medusa" (2009)
- "Evergreen EP" (Lau vs Karine Polwart, 2010)

==== DVDs ====
- Here's Where Tomorrow Starts (2011)

=== Collaborations and guest appearances ===
- Various artists - The Complete Songs of Robert Burns, Volume 7 (1999)
- MacAlias - Highwired (2000)
- Various artists - The Complete Songs of Robert Burns, Volume 8 (2000)
- Various artists - The Complete Songs of Robert Burns, Volume 9 (2001)
- Various artists - Scots Women (2002)
- Corrina Hewat - My Favourite Place (2003)
- Various artists - Fishing Music (2003)
- Dean Owens - My Town (2004)
- Various artists - Cold Blow these Winter Winds ("Fairytale of New York") (2004)
- Various artists - Scottish Women (2004)
- Corrina Hewat - The Ballad of Eppie Moray (2005)
- Various artists - The Wildlife Album 2 (2005)
- Future Pilot AKA - Eyes of Love / Lights of the City / Changes (2006)
- Roddy Woomble - My Secret is My Silence (2006)
- Various artists - Ballads of the Book (2007)
- Lau - Arc Light (2009)
- Various artists - Darwin Song Project (2009)
- Kris Drever - Mark the Hard Earth (2010)
- Robert Lawrence - The Journey Home (2010)
- The Fruit Tree Foundation - First Edition (2011)
- Various Artists - Joy of Living: A Tribute to Ewan MacColl (2015)
- Songs of Separation - Songs of Separation (2016)
- Yew Tree (Polwart and RM Hubbert) - Telling the Trees (2016)
- Spell Songs - The Lost Words: Spell Songs (2019)
- Spell Songs - Spell Songs II: Let the Light In (2021)
- Mary Chapin Carpenter, Julie Fowlis & Karine Polwart - Looking for the Thread (2025)

=== Malinky ===
- Last Leaves (2000)
- 3 Ravens (2002)

=== Battlefield Band ===
- Happy Daze (2001)
