= Taplas =

Welsh folk music magazine

Taplas was a folk music magazine which covered the genre in Wales and its border areas of England. It existed between 1982 and 2013.

== Overview ==
While firmly based in Wales and the borders, and running out of a head office in Cardiff, Taplas's focus included folk, traditional, bluegrass, and world music.

Features were often commissioned if the subject was performing in the core area during the time scale of the magazine's shelf life, but not exclusively so. There was almost always some coverage of at least one Wales-based artist in each issue.

Each issue featured news, in-depth features, reviews, listings and some comment. From 2007 the magazine also had a regular feature on traditional dance, On Your Feet, which profiled a traditional dance side or team within the core area of the magazine's coverage. The magazine was published in black and white, with a full colour cover. Extra colour pages were often added for the festival supplement edition, in April/May of each year.

Taplas also published a series of cover-mount CDs, and runs a folk festival guide supplement in the April/May issue each year.

== History ==
Taplas was founded in 1982 to replace the defunct South Wales Folk News publication. The first editor was Keith Hudson.

The magazine was initially quarterly, but eventually expanded to six issues a year and is published bi-monthly.

The magazine had a number of volunteer contributors, who submitted features and reviews to the publication. Much of the core writing (news stories, listings, and so on), and a good deal of the photography, was done by Keith Hudson. Design work was undertaken by Jed Williams from 1988 onwards.

The magazine also had an editorial board, whose membership was fixed, to determine the direction the publication would take. A CD was produced for the June/July issue in 2000 to celebrate the new Millennium.

== 2003 to 2015 ==
Lucy Whitfield, a Taplas contributor from 1999 onwards, took over design duties for the magazine from November 2003 after the sudden death of Jed Williams from a heart attack.

Due to Keith Hudson's declining health over the next few years the editorial board felt that a new editor was needed. Lucy Whitfield was voted into that role during 2007, and took up the reins in November of that year.

The magazine was run by a team of three, with Lucy Whitfield as editor, long term contributor Mick Tems (formerly of Calennig) as deputy editor, and ex-editor Keith Hudson as reviews editor. All contributions and staffing roles were voluntary.

Taplas actively supported both the BBC Young Folk Award and the BBC Radio 2 Folk Awards, sending a representative to both events, and providing coverage afterwards. The magazine also attended many folk festivals throughout the summer months, and often provided pictorial coverage of the events.

The magazine was given a redesign for its 150th issue.

Taplas issue 163 (December 2010/January 2011) would for the first time centre on a theme. Every article in the issue was linked to traditional dance, which was determined by guest assistant editor for the issue Laurel Swift.

Keith Hudson took the reins again until years of ill-health saw his demise on 27 June 2015.

Each issue contained the latest news & listings, stimulating features and a comprehensive review section.

Taplas' annual Festival Guide appeared as a supplement to the April/May edition and for a number of years the June/July and October/November editions were accompanied by a free compilation CD.
