= Seckou Keita =

Senegalese musician

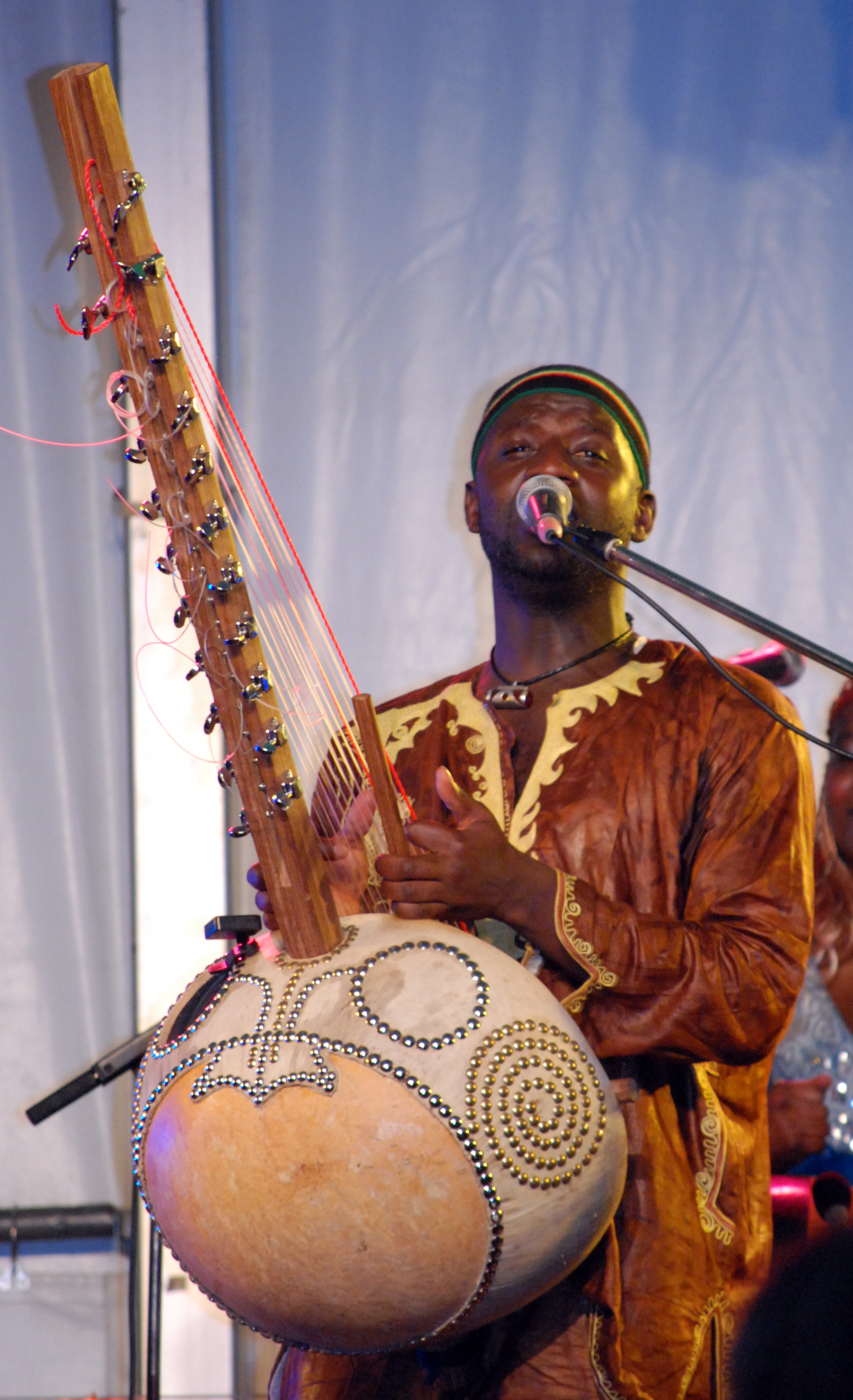
- Seckou Keita playing in Albany, Western Australia.

Background information
- Born: 14 February 1978 (age 48); Ziguinchor, Senegal
- Genres: Senegalese music, Griot music
- Instrument: Kora
- Years active: 1996-present

Seckou Keita (born 14 February 1978) is a kora player and drummer from Senegal. He is one of the few champions of the lesser-known kora repertoire from Casamance in southern Senegal.

== Musical career ==
Keita was born in Ziguinchor, Senegal. Through his father he is a descendant of the Malian Keita family of kings, and his mother's family, the Cissokhos, are a griot family (hereditary musicians). He launched his international career in 1996 under the guidance of his uncle Solo Cissokho with appearances at Norway's Forde Festival in a successful collaboration with Cuban, Indian and Scandinavian musicians. In the years that followed, Keita relocated to the United Kingdom, while touring regularly in Spain, France, Portugal, Greece and the Czech Republic as well as playing at such festivals as WOMAD and Glastonbury, both as a solo musician, and in collaboration with acclaimed figures like Indian violinist Dr. L. Subramaniam.

Keita developed his work on the kora and with support slots to luminaries like Salif Keita and Youssou N'Dour, solo slots at London's Jazz Café and at Ireland's Sacred Music Festival, and a nomination in 2001 for BBC Radio 3's prestigious World Music Award. Keita formed the Seckou Keita Quartet in 2004, later expanding into the Seckou Keita Quintet with the addition of his sister Binta Susso on vocals.

Based near Nottingham in England, Keita runs drumming and kora workshops in schools, arts centres and festivals, working with organisations such as Music For Change, Creative Partnerships and WOMAD. He is also a regular guest leader for Sewa Beats, a company which offers corporate learning through rhythm and music.

== Contributions to the kora ==
Seckou has made several significant contributions to kora music, firstly with developing his original kora tunings in 2002. "There are four basic traditional tunings," he explains, "which are linked to the different regions in Senegal, Gambia, Guinea-Bissau and Mali where the kora is played. Each region has its own distinct tuning. My own approach has been to put all these tunings together in the same instrument, so while still rooted in tradition, the sound is quite different to what people are used to hearing, and the range of material I can perform is greatly extended."

In 2003, interested in seeing how much further he could push his kora playing, he asked his cousin Aliou Gassama to create a double-necked kora for him, which he uses for performances and some recordings.

Additionally, Keita has been constructive in making the kora more accessible outside the traditional griot families. Initially, he was considering the value of having a physical record of his music, and how that would help his children to learn the kora and its music without being part of the upbringing he had had, and using sources more familiar to them while growing up in the UK. Historically, only griots would learn the kora from family members by listening and repetition, so with the assistance of Latin jazz pianist, composer and producer Alex Wilson, Keita worked on deconstructing the kora and its outputs so that it could be transcribed and adapted for Western instruments. Eight books of kora music adapted for the piano, flute, cello, violin and clarinet were launched in 2020 and are available for sale from his website. Prior to their release, the world premiere of the transcriptions was performed by Sinfonia Cymru musicians Abel Selaocoe (cello) and Helen Wilson (flute), award-winning jazz pianist Zoe Rahman and Paul Moylan (double bass) in a twilight concert at the Howard Assembly Room at Opera North, Leeds, in January 2019.

== Collaborations ==
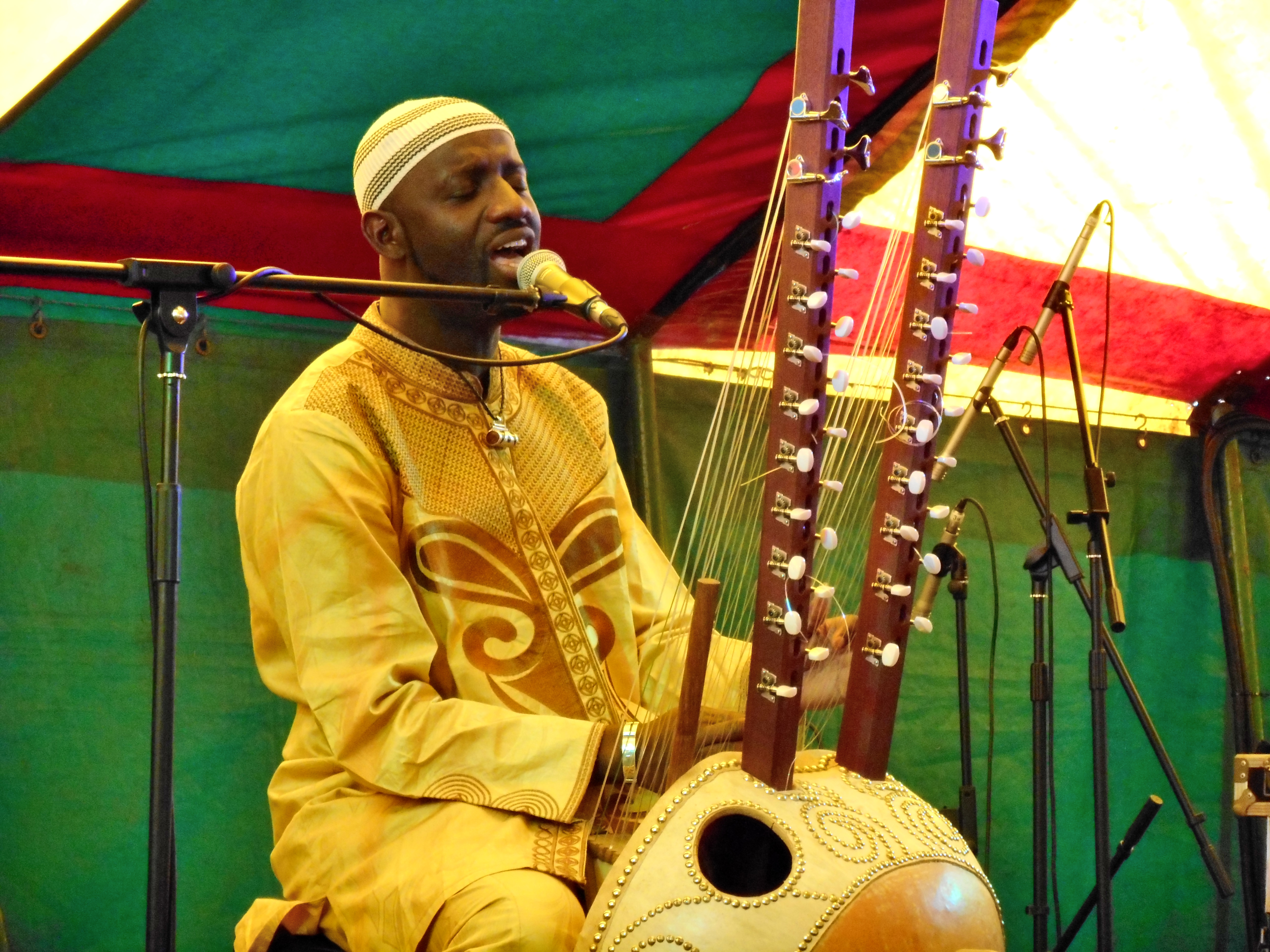
Seckou Keita performing at the Draig Beats festival, Treborth Botanic Garden, Bangor, Wales, 9 June 2018, playing his specially made double-necked kora.

Throughout his career, Keita has collaborated with other artists, including musicians with different backgrounds; a 2010 review described Keita's work as "Witnessing Keita you are assured that his many collaborations have fed and extended rather than diluted the African main spring of his music"; Keita has said “Everything in music has to be honest, and the deeper meanings of the songs and melodies must be preserved. This is why it’s important that collaborations should be right for the music, and there are connections between, say, Cuban and Indian sounds and the repertoire of the kora that can be explored without losing the distinct flavours of the different traditions and styles”.

He joined the popular world music group Baka Beyond as a drummer in 1998, contributing to their well-received East To West album, and in 2000 began to record his own solo debut Baiyo (retitled Mali for a later release through ARC Music), which encompassed his musical journey to that date, from Africa to Europe, via India.

In 2013, he replaced Toumani Diabaté on a tour with Welsh harpist Catrin Finch, which was described by Robin Denselow of The Guardian as "one of the classic concerts of the year." Their subsequent albums Clychau Dibon in 2013 and Soar in 2018 won numerous awards, and saw Keita's development as a vocalist. They have continued to collaborate, with an upcoming album planned, and recent performances in 2021 include The Proms, the Brighton Festival and the London Jazz Festival, and a performance in Liverpool with the Royal Liverpool Philharmonic.

In 2012, Keita met Omar Sosa, an acclaimed Cuban jazz pianist, and their debut album Transparent Water, featuring Gustavo Ovalles, was released in 2017, followed by SUBA on 22 October 2021, accompanied by a nationwide tour of England and Wales. Transparent Water was hailed by Songlines as ‘beautiful, rhapsodic… spiritual’ and by World Music Central as ‘mesmerising, evocative and sophisticated.'

In 2019, Keita joined the AKA Trio, "an international musical summit meeting of three world-renowned virtuosos: Antonio Forcione, Seckou Keita and Adriano Adewale"; Forcione is an Italian guitarist-composer while Adewale is a Brazilian percussionist. Their album JOY was released in May 2019, alongside a major UK tour which included the Brighton Festival.

Also in 2019, Keita was part of Spell Songs, which brought together folk musicians, and the artwork and text of Robert McFarlane's and Jackie Morris's children's book The Lost Words: A Spell Book; performances included the Hay International Literary Festival, with a followup concert hall tour planned for early 2022.

In 2020, Keita sought to explore how the traditional role of a griot could address a global tragedy such as the COVID-19 pandemic, so he reached out to other artists and friends, and their contributions resulted in the release of Now Or Never, a charity single to support the International Committee of the Red Cross (ICRC) in July 2020, which featured artists from across Africa, Scotland, India, Cuba and Japan, including Fatoumata Diawara (Mali), Noura Mint Seymali (Mauritania), Kris Drever (Scotland), Anandi Bhattacharya (India), Zule Guerra (Cuba) and Mieko Miyazaki (Japan). All proceeds from Now Or Never go to the ICRC for its global response to COVID-19.

Subsequently, Keita explored ways of collaborating with pan-African artists, including "long time friends, musical heroes and African legends," explaining that he's "collaborated a lot in the West, but not enough in the land of Africa, so that’s where my focus is at the moment." The first of these collaborations was with Aida Samb, a Senegalese singer and performer, with their single Elles Sont Toutes Belles released in February 2021; he has since released Homeland on 21 June 2021 which features the renowned Senegalese vocalist Baaba Maal.

In April 2022, Seckou Keita was co-nominated for two Songlines Awards for his collaborations with Sosa and Spell Songs.

== Awards, nominations and achievements ==
- 1998: Honorary mention in the International Songwriting Competition – Instrumental Category
- 2001: Nomination for the BBC Radio 3 World Music Awards – Audience choice
- 2010: Silimbo Passage, No.1 in the iTunes World Music Chart
- 2012: Miro, No.1 in the European World Music Chart
- 2013: Clychau Dibon fRoots Critics Poll Album of the Year
- 2014: Clychau Dibon No.1 in the Amazon World Music Chart
- 2014: Clychau Dibon Top Ten World Albums - MOJO Magazine
- 2014: BBC Radio 2 Folk Awards - nominees Best Duo and Best Traditional Track (for Les Bras De Mer) with Catrin Finch
- 2014: Best Cross Cultural Collaboration with Catrin Finch - Songlines Magazine
- 2015: 22 Strings voted as one of Sing Out!’s Top Ten Albums for 2015
- 2015: 22 Strings Runner-Up for Best Packaged CD in the fRoots Awards 2015
- 2016: 22 Strings Nominated for Best Artist - Africa & Middle East Category - Songlines Music Awards
- 2016: 22 Strings Winner Best Album - Africa and Middle East Category - Songlines Music Awards
- 2018: SOAR is Number one in the Transglobal World Music Charts for June 2018
- 2018: SOAR is nominated for the Welsh Music Prize 2018.
- 2018: SOAR wins Best Transregional Album 2018 in the Transglobal World Music Chart Awards
- 2018: SOAR wins Songlines Magazine Best Fusion Album 2018
- 2018: SOAR wins fRoots Critics Poll Album of the Year 2018
- 2019: Catrin Finch and Seckou Keita win 'Best Duo/Band' in the BBC Radio 2 Folk Awards 2019
- 2019: Seckou Keita wins 'Musician Of The Year' in the BBC Radio 2 Folk Awards 2019
- 2022: Songlines Awards nominations for Spell Songs (Europe category) and SUBA with Omar Sosa (Fusion category)

== Discography ==
=== Albums ===
- 2000: Seckou Keita - Baiyo (Orphan), later reissued as Mali
- 2001: EtE (Seckou Keita, Martin Cradick, Nii Tagoe) - EtE
- 2003: Jalikunda Cissokho - Lindianeafter
- 2006: Seckou Keita Quartet - Tama Silo: Afro Mandinka Soul
- 2008: Seckou Keita Quartet - Silimbo Passage
- 2012: Seckou Keita - Miro
- 2013: Catrin Finch & Seckou Keita - Clychau Dibon
- 2014: Catrin Finch & Seckou Keita - Gobiath
- 2015: Seckou Keita - 22 Strings
- 2017: Omar Sosa & Seckou Keita - Transparent Water
- 2018: Catrin Finch & Seckou Keita - SOAR
- 2019: AKA Trio - Joy
- 2021: Omar Sosa & Seckou Keita - SUBA
- 2023: Seckou Keita with BBC Concert Orchestra – African Rhapsodies, Arrangements by Davide Mantovani, Cond. Mark Heron. With Abel Selaocoe et al.

=== Singles ===
- 2020: Seckou Keita & Friends - Now or Never
- 2021: Seckou Keita featuring Aida Samb - Elles Sont Toutes Belles
- 2021: Seckou Keita featuring Baaba Maal - Homeland

== Charitable work ==
In November 2010, Keita launched a partnership with the International Committee of the Red Cross (ICRC). He will donate 50% of the proceeds made from sales of his CD, The Silimbo Passage, over six months, to support the ICRC's work to protect and assist victims of war and other situations of violence. Keita chose the ICRC because he had come into contact with the humanitarian organization when he was a child in the Casamance (a region that has been affected by armed violence for the last 30 years). “The International Red Cross sparks memories from my youth. I didn't know what they were about but I knew they were doing good things,” he says.

In August 2020, he sought contributions from musicians around the world to produce a charity single, Now Or Never, to support the ICRC's global response to the coronavirus pandemic.

== Personal life ==
Keita moved to the UK in 1999 and currently lives in Sneinton, England. Keita is the elder brother of kora player Suntou Susso.
