= Fairest Floo'er =

Studio album by Karine Polwart
- Released: 10 December 2007
- Genre: Folk

Karine Polwart chronology
Scribbled in Chalk (2006)	Fairest Floo'er (2007)	This Earthly Spell (2008)

Fairest Floo'er is the third studio album by Scottish folk musician Karine Polwart, released on 10 December 2007. Fairest Floo'er is one of two albums that Polwart recorded in 2007 during a break from live performances; Polwart was pregnant with her first child whilst recording.

Unlike her other solo albums, Fairest Floo'er mostly comprises traditional songs. It also differs from her other albums in its sparse instrumentation; instead of a full band, Karine is backed only by her brother Steven Polwart on guitar, and on two tracks by Kim Edgar on piano. The final song, "Can't Weld a Body", listed as a "preview track" on the track listing, is the only original song on the album and was composed for the "Ballad of the Big Ships" episode of BBC Radio's 2006 Radio Ballads series.

== Track listing ==
All songs Traditional, arranged by Karine Polwart, except "Can't Weld a Body" composed by Polwart.

1. "Dowie Dens of Yarrow" – 6:01
2. "Thou Hast Left Me Ever Jamie" – 3:00
3. "Mirk, Mirk Is The Midnight Hour" – 3:55
4. "Birks of Invermay" – 3:00
5. "Will Ye Go Tae Flanders?" – 3:57
6. "The Learig" – 3:18
7. "The Death of Queen Jane" – 3:45
8. "The Wife of Usher's Well" – 6:49
9. "Can't Weld a Body" – 4:04

== Personnel ==
- Karine Polwart: acoustic guitar, lead vocals
- Steven Polwart: acoustic and electric guitars, vocals
- Kim Edgar: piano (1, 6)
