= The Burns Unit =

Scottish-Canadian folk band (2007–2012)

- Origin: Scotland
- Genre: Folk
- Years active: 2007–2012
- Label: Burns Unit
- Past members: Emma Pollock; Future Pilot AKA; Karine Polwart; Kim Edgar; King Creosote; Mattie Foulds; Soom T; Michael Johnston

The Burns Unit was an eight-piece Scottish-Canadian folk music supergroup. The band formed in 2006, after the musicians met at Burnsong, a Scottish songwriting retreat. The band members come from varying musical genres including folk, pop and rap, and all have either acclaimed solo careers or are also members of other bands. The band had its debut concert in 2009 in Glasgow, Scotland, at the Celtic Connections music festival. In 2010, they released their debut album, Side Show. They continued to perform gigs and at festivals during 2011-2012, then amicably split, with members continuing their own respective careers.

In 2012, King Creosote noted that he is working on a collaborative album with bandmate Michael Johnston, stating: "I have a half completed album lying in Toronto with my friend Michael Johnston from the Burns Unit". The album, The Bound of the Red Deer, was finally released in May 2016 - just a few months before King Creosote also released a new solo album. The duo's album features contributions from former bandmates Karine Polwart and Emma Pollock as well as American musician and producer Gurf Morlix.
