= Pascal Lamour =

French Breton musician (born 1958)

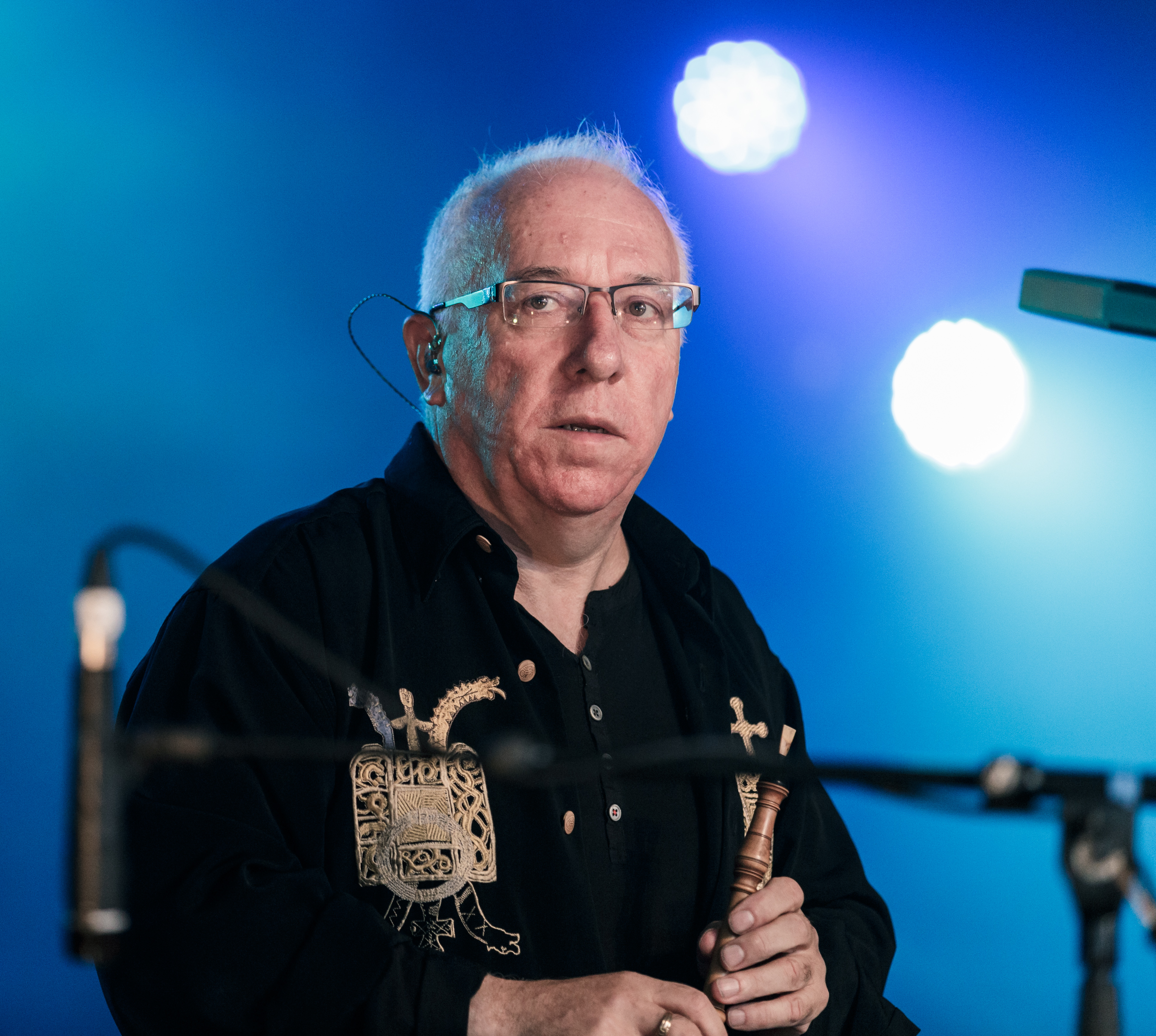
- Pascal Lamour, 2017

Background information
- Born: 28 October 1958 (age 67)
- Origin: Theix, Brittany
- Genres: Breton music
- Years active: 1994 – present
- Labels: BNC
- Website: Official Website

Pascal Lamour (born 28 October 1958 in Theix, Morbihan) is a French Breton musician. After a long career as an herbalist, he devoted himself entirely to music since 2000. He has produced thirteen albums under his own label, BNC, since 1994, but has actually made known in the music business since 2005–2006. He has played throughout Europe, and in Quebec, the United States, Brazil, Vietnam and other countries.

He mixes traditional Breton music with electronic rhythms. In 2010, he wrote a book illustrated by Bruno Brucero.
