= Scotland Yet =

- Film poster
- Directed by: Jack Foster
- Written by: Jack Foster; Christopher Silver
- Produced by: Christopher Silver
- Distributed by: Rough Justice Films
- Release dates: 8 July 2014 (Scotland); 21 August 2014 (Worldwide)
- Running time: 92 minutes
- Country: United Kingdom
- Language: English
- Budget: £28,000

Scotland Yet is a 2014 documentary film directed by Scottish filmmaker and journalist Jack Foster, and produced by Christopher Silver. The film focuses on the more obscure grassroots elements of the Scottish independence campaign, concentrated primarily on those arguing for a Yes vote in the 2014 referendum; the film's tagline is “a film about independence.”

The title of the film alludes to a song by the late Scottish folk singer and songwriter Davy Steele, called ‘Scotland Yet’, written at the time of the 1997 Scottish devolution referendum. Various interpretations of the song feature in the film's soundtrack, created by traditional musicians Rona Wilkie and Marit Fält.

Scotland Yet is, to date, the only feature film to have covered the 2014 Scottish independence referendum.

== Synopsis ==
The film concentrates primarily on the left-wing arguments for Scottish independence, as seen through the eyes of political activists such as Tariq Ali and Robin McAlpine; also journalists such as Ian Bell (journalist) and Lesley Riddoch. The film sets out to document the smaller, less publicised elements of the 2014 pro independence campaign, such as National Collective, Radical Independence and Common Weal. The documentary combines this with a commentary on the historical context of the independence movement, and the controversies surrounding perceived media bias during the campaign.

== Financing ==
Scotland Yet is the first Scottish film to be entirely funded through crowdfunder donations.
