= Dean Owens =

Scottish singer songwriter

- Genres: roots, rock, folk, americana, alt-country
- Occupation: Singer-songwriter
- Instruments: Voice, acoustic guitar, harmonica, whistling
- Years active: 1991 to present
- Labels: CRS (Netherlands), Eel Pie Records (UK)
- Website: www.deanowens.com

Dean Owens is a Scottish singer-songwriter, born and brought up in Leith, Edinburgh, Scotland. Many of Owens' songs relate to his upbringing in the area, including Man From Leith.

Owens’ first serious band was Smile, formed with bass player Kevin McGuire, guitarist Calais Brown and drummer Dave Stewart around 1991 or 1992. Their first single – Obvious – released on Different Class Records, reached no. 20 in the Scottish charts in 1992.

His next band, the Felsons, was built around the core of Owens and McGuire. Developing their signature "Celtabilly"/americana sound, they released their first album – One Step Ahead Of The Posse – in 1996, followed up with a mini album, Lasso The Moon. They were then joined by Smile guitarist Calais Brown and released their third album Glad on G2, a subsidiary of Scottish label Greentrax. The Felsons toured widely in UK, including a tour as support for US band, The Mavericks, before Owens started working on his solo career, including tours in USA, Europe and Australia.

Owens has released eleven official studio albums since 2001, mostly recorded in USA, including Into The Sea (2015) and Southern Wind (2018)) which were recorded in Nashville with Grammy nominated, award winning producer Neilson Hubbard. Reviews (from both sides of the Atlantic), were very positive, and highlighted a "unique Scottish, americana blend" in his music. The title track of Southern Wind (co-written with American musician Will Kimbrough) won the UK Song of the Year Award in 2019 at UK Americana Music Association Awards in London.

A “best of” album – The Man From Leith (with sleeve notes by Trainspotting author Irvine Welsh) – was released in March 2020 on London’s Eel Pie Records, also to very positive reviews.

His eighth album, Sinner’s Shrine, recorded in Tucson, Arizona, with members of ”desert noir” band, Calexico, was released in February 2022 (jointly on London's Eel Pie Records and CRS (Netherlands)). It was preceded by a series of three well received EPs - The Desert Trilogy - released throughout 2021, comprising 4 tracks from Sinner’s Shrine, several from the album sessions and some recorded long distance during lockdown.

Sinner's Shrine was followed in 2023 by El Tiradito (The Curse of Sinner's Shrine) - a double album. Disc 1 comprised tracks from The Desert Trilogy with Disc 2 being an all instrumental, Ennio Morricone inspired "soundtrack from an imaginary Western" (recorded long distance with musicians including Calexico's John Convertino and Martin Wenk). It was inspired by the gory real life story of El Tiradito The Sinner's Shrine in Tucson, Arizona.

Later in 2023 Owens self released Pictures, a long distance recording with Will Kimbrough and Neilson Hubbard. It was picked up for a full release in 2024, including on vinyl, by Continental Record Services (CRS).

Owens' twelfth album is Spirit Ridge recorded at Crinale Studio in north Italy with Italian producer Antonio Gramentieri (also known as Don Antonio), member of Sacri Cuori, released on Continental Record Services (Netherlands) on 14 February 2025 (following a successful £17k Crowdfunder campaign in 2023).

Owens also tours occasionally with Scottish fiddle player Amy Geddes, under the name of Redwood Mountain, with lyrics taken from Alan Lomax’s The Book of American Folk Songs, reimagined with new melodies. A self titled album was released in 2017.

Other projects include the international music/film collaboration, Buffalo Blood (with producer/musician Neilson Hubbard, Audrey Spillman and Joshua Britt). Recorded outdoors, on location in the New Mexico desert (at Echo Canyon and Georgia O'Keeffe's Ghost Ranch), the songs explore themes of migration and displacement of people, especially of Native Americans. A self titled double album was released on Eel Pie Records in 2019, and launched with a live performance at Glasgow’s Celtic Connections.

In March 2020 Owens curated the inaugural Cash Back in Fife Festival, which celebrated the legacy of Johnny Cash, and his family connections to Fife. He was invited to participate in the Official Johnny Cash Heritage Festival (online), broadcast from Dyess Arkansas, in October 2021.

Voted "Best UK Act" in 2021, 2022 and 2023 and "Best UK Album" (2022) in Americana UK Readers Poll.

== Associated bands ==
- Dean Owens & The Sinners (2022 (current))
- Dean Owens & The Southerners (2019-2021)
- Dean Owens & The Whisky Hearts (2015 - 2019)
- Dean Owens & The Celtabilly Allstars - occasional
- Buffalo Blood
- Redwood Mountain
- Deer Lake (2013–2014)
- The Felsons (1996–2000)
- Smile (1991–1995)

== Discography ==
Solo

- Spirit Ridge - Continental Record Services (2025)
- The Ridge Trilogy EPs - Continental Record Services (2024)
- Pictures (with Will Kimbrough and Neilson Hubbard) - Songboy Records/Continental Record Services (2023)
- El Tiradito (The Curse of Sinner's Shrine) - Continental Record Services/Songboy Records (2023)
- Sinner's Shrine – Eel Pie Records/Continental Record Services (2022)
- The Desert Trilogy EPs – Songboy/Eel Pie Records (2021)
- The Man From Leith (The Best of Dean Owens) – Eel Pie Records (2020)
- Southern Wind – At The Helm Records (2018)
- Into The Sea – Drumfire Records (2015)
- New York Hummingbird – Songboy Records (2012)
- Cash Back (Songs I Learned From Johnny) – Drumfire Records (2012)
- Whisky Hearts – Navigator Records (2008)
- My Town – Vertical Records (2004)
- The Droma Tapes – Songboy Records (2001)

The Felsons

- Glad – G2 (1998)
- Lasso the Moon (1996)
- One Step Ahead Of The Posse (1996)

Other

- Buffalo Blood – Buffalo Blood – Eel Pie Records (2019)
- Redwood Mountain – Redwood Mountain – Drumfire Records (2017)
