= Scots Trad Music Awards =

Awards for traditional Scottish music

- Awarded for: Scottish traditional music
- Sponsored by: MG ALBA
- Country: Scotland
- Presented by: Hands Up for Trad
- Hosted by: Mary Ann Kennedy; Kim Carnie
- First award: 2003; 23 years ago

Television/radio coverage
- Network: BBC ALBA

The Scots Trad Music Awards or Na Trads were founded in 2003 by Simon Thoumire to celebrate Scotland's traditional music in all its forms and create a high profile opportunity to bring the music and music industry into the spotlight of media and public attention. Nominations are made by the public and in 2019 over 100,000 public votes were expected across 18 categories.

The awards are organised by Thoumire's organisation Hands Up for Trad. Since 2008 the awards have been sponsored by MG Alba, and the event is televised on BBC Alba.

Since 2019 the ceremony has included the awarding of The Belhaven Bursary for Innovation in Scottish Music, sponsored by Belhaven Brewery. The prize consists of £25,000, an ale brewed with the winner's name on it, an appearance at an event at Tartan Week in New York and the use of the winner's music in an advertising campaign. The cash prize is the largest music prize in Scotland, matched only by the Mercury Prize.

== Award winners ==
=== 2025 ===
- Album of the Year: araon by Sian
- Citty Finlayson Scots Singer of the Year: Ellie Beaton
- Club of the Year: North East Accordion and Fiddle Club
- Community Project of the Year: The Royal National Mòd
- Composer of the Year: Findlay Napier
- Event of the Year: BBC Radio Scotland Young Traditional Musician of Year - 25th Anniversary
- Folk Band of the Year: Blazin' Fiddles
- Gaelic Singer of the Year: Kim Carnie
- Industry Person of the Year: Donald Shaw
- Live Act of the Year: Skerryvore
- Musician of the Year: Siobhan Miller
- Music Tutor of the Year: Innes Watson
- Original Work of the Year: The Great Herdsman of Etive by RURA
- Scottish Dance Band of the Year: The Ceilidh Collective
- Scottish Pipe Band of the Year: Glasgow Skye Association Pipe Band
- Up and Coming Artist of the Year: Dàna
- Venue of the Year: Park Bar, Glasgow

=== 2024 ===
- Album of the Year: The Waiting Room by Eamonn Nugent
- Event of the Year: Skipinnish at Edinburgh Castle
- Finlayson Scots Singer of the Year: Beth Malcolm
- Club of the Year: Ardersier International Folk Club, Moray
- Community Project of the Year: Fèis air an Oir
- Composer of the Year: Alec Dalglish
- Gaelic Singer of the Year: Emma 'Scalpay' MacLeod
- Live Act of the Year: Niteworks
- Music Tutor of the Year: Douglas Montgomery
- Musician of the Year: Ciorstaidh Beaton
- Original Work of the Year: Ar Cànan 's ar Ceòl by Trail West
- Scottish Dance Band of the Year: Pure Scotch Ceilidh Band
- Scottish Folk Band of the Year: The Paul McKenna Band
- Scottish Pipe Band of the Year: Skye Youth Pipe Band
- Trad Music in the Media: Crùnluath / Piping Sounds with Michael Steele & Ewen Henderson
- Up and Coming Artist of the Year: Falasgair
- Venue of the Year: Eden Court, Inverness

=== 2023 ===
- Album of the Year: Duncan Chisholm - Black Cuillin
- Musician of the Year: Julie Fowlis
- Citty Finlayson Scots Singer of the Year: Iona Fyfe
- Gaelic Singer of the Year: Eilidh Cormack
- Live Act of the Year: Trail West
- Scottish Dance Band: Iain MacPhail
- Scottish Folk Band: Blazin’ Fiddles
- Scottish Pipe Band: The Peoples Ford Boghall and Bathgate Caledonia Pipe Band.
- Up and Coming Artist: The Shands
- Original Work: The Clearances Again by Donald Francis MacNeil and Skipinnish
- Club of the Year: The Gaitherin South Sessions in Glasgow
- Venue of the Year: The Tolbooth, Stirling
- Event of the Year: Orkney Folk Festival
- Community Project of the Year: Fèis Rois Ceilidh Trail
- Trad Music in the Media BBC Radio Scotland’s Travelling Folk
- Composer of the Year: Heidi Talbot
- Music Tutor of the Year: Domhnall Bàn MacDonald.
- Sue Wilson New Writer Award: Angus MacPhail of The Oban Times
- Services to Gaelic Award: John Urquhart
- The Janet Paisley Services to Scots Language Award: Donald Smith
- Graphics Designer of the Year: Somhairle MacDonald
- Traditional Music Enabler of the Year: Mhari McLeman of Shetland Folk Festival
- Photographer of the Year: Euan Robertson Photography
- Venue Technician of the Year: Gary Craig of The Ceilidh Place

=== 2022 ===
The ceremony was held at the Caird Hall in Dundee.

- Event of the Year: Hebcelt Festival (Lewis)
- Album of The Year: For The Night by Elephant Sessions
- Citty Finlayson Scots Singer of the Year: Beth Malcolm
- Club of The Year: Aberdeen Folk Club
- Community Music Project of the Year: Isle of Arran Music School
- Composer of the Year: Rachel Newton, Lauren MacColl (Heal & Harrow)
- Gaelic Singer of the Year: Ruairidh Gray
- Lighting Designer of the Year: Greig Shankland
- Live Act of the Year: Skerryvore
- Live Sound Engineer of the Year: Scott Turnbull
- Music Producer of the Year: Anna Massie
- Music Tutor of the Year: Charlie Mckerron
- Musician of the Year: Megan Henderson
- Original Work of the Year: Talamh Beò – Living Land, commissioned by Coigach & Assynt Living Landscape Partnership Scheme
- Recording Studio of the Year: GloWorm Recording (Glasgow)
- Scottish Dance Band of the Year: Alan Crookston Band
- Scottish Folk Band of the Year: Breabach
- Scottish Pipe Band of the Year: Inveraray and District Pipe Band
- Services to Gaelic: Dr Anne Lorne Gillies
- Studio Engineer of the Year: Keith Morrison (Wee Studio)
- The Hamish Henderson Services to Traditional Music Awards: Caroline Maclennan from HebCelt Festival
- The Janet Paisley Services to Scots Language: Anne Donovan
- Trad Music in the Media: Heading West: a story about a band called Shooglenifty
- Trad Video of the Year: She Moves Me by Kim Carnie
- Up & Coming Artist of the Year: Valtos
- Venue of the Year: Knoydart Community Hall

=== 2021 ===
The ceremony was held at the Engine Works in Glasgow.

- Original Work of the Year: 7 Years Old by Calum MacPhail
- Community Project of the Year: Riddell Fiddles’ Two Towns Housing Estate Youth Musical Outreach Programme
- Event of the Year: Celtic Connections
- Gaelic Singer of the Year: Kim Carnie
- Musician of the Year: Iona Fyfe
- Online Performance of 2021: Norrie "Tago" MacIver Live Streams
- Citty Finlayson Scots Singer of the Year: Ellie Beaton
- Trad Video of the Year: Doddies Dream by Bruce MacGregor
- Trad Music in the Media: Ceòl is Cràdh (Mental health in musicians’ documentary) on BBC Alba.
- Up and Coming Artist of the Year: The Canny Band
- Music Tutor of the Year: Craig Muirhead, Director of Piping and Drumming at Strathallan School
- Album of the Year: Where the World Is Thin by Kris Drever

=== 2020 ===
The awards had been due to be staged in the Caird Hall Dundee, but were moved online due to the COVID-19 pandemic, and presented by Alistair Heather and Mary Ann Kennedy. The categories were also adapted for the circumstances.

- Album of The Year: The Woods by Hamish Napier
- Original Work of the Year: Everyday Heroes by Skerryvore
- Community Music Project of the Year: "Tunes in the Hoose"
- Event of the Year Award: BBC Radio Scotland Young Traditional Musician Award 20th Anniversary Concert (Celtic Connections)
- Gaelic Singer of the Year: Fionnag NicChoinnich (Fiona MacKenzie)
- Musician of the Year: Tim Edey
- Online Performance of 2020: Duncan Chisholm's Covid Ceilidh
- Citty Finlayson Scots Singer of the Year: Siobhan Miller
- Trad Video of the Year: Calum Dan's Transit Van by Peat & Diesel
- Trad Music in the Media: Anna Massie – Black Isle Correspondent
- Up & Coming artist of the Year: Rebecca Hill
- Music Tutor of the Year: Josie Duncan
- Janet Paisley Services to Scots Language Award: James Robertson
- Services to Gaelic Award: John Smith (BBC Television)
- Hamish Henderson Award for Services to Traditional Music: Lisa Whytock

=== 2019 ===
The awards were staged in Aberdeen.

- Album of the Year: Frenzy of the Meeting by Breabach
- The Belhaven Bursary for Innovation in Scottish Music: Kinnaris Quintet
- Club of the Year: Sutherland Sessions
- Composer of the Year: Jenna Reid
- Community Project of the Year: SEALL Festival of Small Halls
- Event of the Year: Tiree Music Festival
- Gaelic Singer of the Year: Mary Ann Kennedy
- Musician of the Year: Jenn Butterworth
- Live Act of the Year: Peat and Diesel
- Citty Finlayson Scots Singer of the Year: Steve Byrne
- Scottish Dance Band of the Year: The Cruickshank Family Band
- Scottish Folk Band of the Year: Blazin' Fiddles
- Scottish Pipe Band of the Year: Inveraray & District Pipe Band
- Trad Video of the Year: Heroes by Tide Lines
- Music Tutor of the Year: Iain Ruari Finlayson, Skye Schools
- Up and Coming Artist of the Year: Man of the Minch
- Venue of the Year Award: An Tobar (Mull)
- The Hamish Henderson Services to Traditional Music Award: Dr. Peter Cooke
- Services to Gaelic: Anne Soutar
- The Janet Paisley Services to Scots Language: Sheena Blackhall

=== 2018 ===
The awards were staged in Perth and broadcast live on BBC Alba.

- Belhaven Bursary for Innovation in Scottish Music: Talisk
- Album of the Year : Sandwood by Duncan Chisholm
- Club of the Year: Partick Folk Club
- Composer of the Year: Duncan Chisholm
- Community Project of the Year: Care for a Ceilidh
- Event of the Year: Far Far from Ypres
- Gaelic Singer of the Year: Eilidh Cormack
- Instrumentalist of the Year: Calum Stewart
- Live Act of the Year: Elephant Sessions
- Citty Finlayson Scots Singer of the Year: Iona Fyfe
- Scottish Dance Band of the Year: Susan MacFadyen
- Scottish Folk Band of the Year: Dàimh
- Scottish Pipe Band of the Year: Inveraray & District Pipe Band
- Trad Music in the Media: Pipeline, BBC Radio Scotland
- Music Tutor of the Year: Anna Wendy Stevenson
- Up and Coming Artist of the Year: Assynt
- Venue of the Year Award: Drygate Brewery, Glasgow
- Services to Gaelic: Runrig
- The Hamish Henderson Services to Traditional Music Award: Pete Shepheard
- Services to Scots Language: Janet Paisley

=== 2017 ===
The awards were staged at Lagoon Centre, Paisley and broadcast live on BBC Alba.

- Album of the Year: All We Have Is Now by Elephant Sessions
- Citty Finlayson Scots Singer of the Year: Siobhan Miller
- Club of the Year: Edinburgh Folk Club
- Community Project of the Year: Tiree Songbook
- Composer of the Year: Adam Sutherland
- Dance Band of the Year: Duncan Black Band
- Event of the Year: A Night for Angus (Shooglenifty at Celtic Connections)
- Folk Band of the Year: Talisk
- Gaelic Singer of the Year: Robert Robertson
- Instrumentalist of the Year: Gary Innes
- Live Act of the Year: Skipinnish
- Music Tutor of the Year: Emma Tomlinson
- Scottish Pipe Band of the Year: Inveraray & District Pipe Band
- Trad Music in the Media: BBC Radio 2 Folk Awards
- Up and Coming Artist of the Year: Hò-rò
- Venue of the Year: Tolbooth, Stirling

=== 2016 ===
The awards were staged at Caird Hall, Dundee and broadcast live on BBC Alba.

- Album of the Year: Astar by Breabach
- Club of the Year: Stonehaven Folk Club
- Composer of the Year: Kris Drever
- Community Project of the Year: Feis Rois Life Long Learning Project
- Event of the Year: Piping Live! Festival, Glasgow
- Gaelic Singer of the Year: Ellen MacDonald
- Instrumentalist of the Year: Rachel Newton
- Live Act of the Year: Skerryvore
- Citty Finlayson Scots Singer of the Year: Lori Watson
- Scottish Dance Band of the Year: Trail West
- Folk Band of the Year: Breabach
- Scottish Pipe Band of the Year: North Lanarkshire Schools Pipe Band
- Trad Music in the Media: BBC Radio Scotland's Take the Floor
- Music Tutor of the Year: Jim Hunter
- Up and Coming Artist of the Year: Ryan Young
- Venue of the Year: The Glad Café, Glasgow

=== 2015 ===
The awards were staged at Caird Hall, Dundee and broadcast live on BBC Alba.

- Album of the Year: Grind by Treacherous Orchestra
- Club of the Year: Orkney Accordion and Fiddle Club
- Composer of the Year: Ross Ainslie
- Community Project of the Year: Live Music Now Scotland
- Event of the Year: GRIT: Celtic Connections Opening Concert
- Gaelic Singer of the Year: Griogair Labhruidh
- Instrumentalist of the Year: Mairi Campbell
- Live Act of the Year: RURA
- Citty Finlayson Scots Singer of the Year: Fiona Hunter
- Scottish Dance Band of the Year: Simon Howie
- Scottish Folk Band of the Year: Dàimh
- Pipe Band of the Year: Shotts and Dykehead Caledonia Pipe Band
- Trad Music in the Media: Port, BBC Alba
- Music Tutor of the Year: Jenn Butterworth
- Up and Coming Artist of the Year: League of Highland Gentlemen
- Venue of the Year Award: SEALL at Sabhal Mòr Ostaig

=== 2014 ===
The awards were staged at the Inverness Leisure Centre and broadcast live on BBC Alba.

- Album of the Year: Live at Celtic Connections by Duncan Chisholm
- Club of the Year: Tin Hut Sessions
- Composer of the Year: Jim Sutherland
- Community Project of the Year: Summer Isles Festival
- Event of the Year: GRIT: The Martyn Bennett Story
- Gaelic Singer of the Year: Mischa Macpherson
- Instrumentalist of the Year: Catriona McKay
- Live Act of the Year: Skipinnish
- Citty Finlayson Scots Singer of the Year: Emily Smith
- Scottish Dance Band of the Year: Da Fustra
- Scottish Folk Band of the Year: Julie Fowlis
- Pipe Band of the Year: West Lothian Schools pipe band
- Trad Music in the Media: Isles FM
- Music Tutor of the Year: Douglas Montgomery
- Up and Coming Artist of the Year: The Elephant Sessions
- Venue of the Year Award: The Ceilidh Place

=== 2013 ===
The 2013 ceremony was held in Aberdeen.

- Album of the Year: Room Enough For All by Battlefield Band
- Club of the Year: Folklub
- Composer of the Year: Donald Shaw
- Community Project of the Year: Gizzen Briggs (Tain Royal Academy)
- Event of the Year: Tiree Music Festival
- Gaelic Singer of the Year: Rachel Walker
- Instrumentalist of the Year: Chris Stout (Shetland)
- Live Act of the Year: Breabach
- Citty Finlayson Scots Singer of the Year: Siobhan Miller
- Scottish Dance Band of the Year: Trail West
- Scottish Folk Band of the Year: Blazin' Fiddles
- Pipe Band of the Year: Ullapool and District Junior Pipe Band
- Trad Music in the Media: Travelling Folk, BBC Radio Scotland
- Music Tutor of the Year: Corrina Hewat (Borders)
- Up and Coming Artist of the Year: Robert Robertson
- Venue of the Year Award: National Piping Centre, Glasgow

=== 2012 ===
- Album of the Year: Cille Bhrìde (Kilbride) by Kathleen MacInnes
- Club of the Year: Falkirk Folk Club
- Composer of the Year: Mike Vass
- Community Project of the Year: Feis Rois Local and National Ceilidh Trail 2012
- Event of the Year: Scots Fiddle Festival
- Gaelic Singer of the Year: Riona Whyte
- Instrumentalist of the Year: Duncan Chisholm
- Live Act of the Year: Session A9
- Citty Finlayson Scots Singer of the Year: Paul McKenna
- Scottish Dance Band of the Year: Deoch 'n' Dorus
- Scottish Folk Band of the Year: Breabach
- Pipe Band of the Year: George Watson's College Pipes and Drums
- Trad Music in the Media: Julie Fowlis for Brave
- Music Tutor of the Year: Gillian Frame
- Up and Coming Artist of the Year: Niteworks
- Venue of the Year Award: Bogbain Farm, Inverness

=== 2011 ===
The ceremony was held in the Perth Concert Hall.

- Album of the Year: Mànran by Mànran
- Club of the Year: Leith Folk Club
- Composer of the Year: Aidan O'Rourke
- Community Project of the Year: Blazin' in Beauly
- Event of the Year: Orkney Folk Festival
- Instrumentalist of the Year: Innes Watson
- Live Act of the Year: Skerryvore
- Citty Finlayson Scots Singer of the Year: Siobhan Miller
- Gaelic Singer of the Year: Norrie MacIver
- Scottish Folk Band of the Year: Battlefield Band
- Pipe Band of the Year: Field Marshal Montgomery Pipe Band
- Scottish Dance Band of the Year: Robern Nairn
- Trad Music in the Media Award: Transatlantic Sessions
- Music Tutor of the Year: Mairi Campbell
- Up and Coming Artist of the Year: RURA
- Venue of the Year: Ben Nevis

=== 2010 ===
- Album of the Year: Uam by Julie Fowlis
- Club of the Year: Highland Club (Inverness)
- Composer of the Year: Iain Morrison
- Community Project of the Year: Orkney Traditional Music Project
- Event of the Year: Shetland Folk Festival
- Instrumentalist of the Year: Martin O'Neill
- Live Act of the Year: Red Hot Chilli Pipers
- Citty Finlayson Scots Singer of the Year: Joe Aitken
- Gaelic Singer of the Year: Eilidh Mackenzie
- Scottish Folk Band of the Year: Malinky
- Scottish Pipe Band of the Year: Oban High School Pipe Band
- Scottish Dance Band of the Year: Ian Muir Scottish Dance Band
- Trad Music in the Media Award: Travelling Folk, BBC Radio Scotland
- Music Tutor of the Year: Gordon Connell
- Up and Coming Artist of the Year: Matheu Watson
- Venue of the Year: Skipinnish Ceilidh House, Oban

=== 2009 ===
- Album of the Year: All Dressed in Yellow by Fiddlers' Bid
- Club of the Year: Stonehaven Folk Club
- Composer of the Year: Mairearad Green
- Community of the Year: Caledonian Canal Ceilidh Trail
- Event of the Year: Hebridean Celtic Festival
- Instrumentalist of the Year: Lauren MacColl
- Live Act of the Year: Lau
- Citty Finlayson Scots Singer of the Year: Shona Donaldson
- Gaelic Singer of the Year: Christine Primrose
- Scottish Folk Band of the Year: Bodega
- Scottish Pipe Band of the Year: Haddington Pipe Band
- Scottish Dance Band of the Year: Tom Orr Scottish Dance Band
- Trad Music in the Media Award: The Reel Blend (BBC Radio Scotland)
- Music Tutor of the Year: Ian Duncan
- Up and Coming Artist of the Year: Paul McKenna Band
- Venue of the Year: The Old Fruit Market Glasgow

=== 2008 ===
- Album of the Year: Farrar by Duncan Chisholm
- Composer of the Year: Blair Douglas
- Live Act of the Year: Peatbog Faeries
- Instrumentalist of the Year: Kris Drever
- Up and Coming Artist of the Year: Jeana Leslie & Siobhan Miller
- Gaelic Singer of the Year: Margaret Stewart
- Club of the Year: The Wee Folk Club, Edinburgh
- Community Project of the Year: Ceolas
- Event of the Year: Piping Live! - Glasgow International Piping Festival
- Services to Industry Award: Arthur Cormack
- Citty Finlayson Scots Singer of the Year: Emily Smith
- Scottish Dance Band of the Year: Skipinnish
- Scottish Folk Band of the Year: The Chair
- Scottish Pipe Band of the Year: ScottishPower Pipe Band
- Strathspey and Reel Society of the Year: Scottish Fiddle Orchestra
- Venue of the Year: Perth Concert Hall

=== 2007 ===
- Album of the Year: Cuilidh by Julie Fowlis
- Composer of the Year: Phil Cunningham
- Live Act of the Year:Red Hot Chilli Pipers
- Instrumentalist of the Year: Catriona McKay
- Up and Coming Artist of the Year: Maeve Mackinnon
- Gaelic Singer of the Year: Julie Fowlis
- Club of the Year: Ceol's Craic, Glasgow
- Community Project of the Year: Scots Music Group
- Event of the Year: The Royal National Mod
- Services to Industry Award: John Purser for Scotland's Music – A Radio History
- Citty Finlayson Scots Singer of the Year: Mairi Campbell
- Scottish Dance Band of the Year: Cullivoe Dance Band
- Scottish Folk Band of the Year: Old Blind Dogs
- Scottish Pipe Band of the Year: The Mid Argyll Pipe Band
- Strathspey and Reel Society of the Year: Fochabers Fiddlers
- Venue of the Year: An Lanntair (Stornoway)

=== 2006 ===
- Album of the Year: Heart of America by Donnie Munro
- Club of the Year: Wick Accordion and Fiddle Club
- Composer of the Year: Donald Shaw
- Community Project of the Year: Fèisean nan Gàidheal
- Event of the Year: World Pipe Band Championships
- Gaelic Singer of the Year: Kathleen MacInnes
- Instrumentalist of the Year: Aidan O'Rourke
- Live Act of the Year: The McCalmans
- Citty Finlayson Scots Singer of the Year: Sylvia Barnes
- Scottish Dance Band of the Year: Marian Anderson Scottish Dance Band
- Scottish Folk Band of the Year: Anna Massie Band
- Scottish Pipe Band of the Year: Kintyre Schools Pipe Band
- Services to Industry Award: Johnny Mowat
- Strathspey and Reel Society of the Year: Banchory Strathspey and Reel Society
- The McEwan's Sessions Venue of the Year: The Lismore, Glasgow
- Up and Coming Artist of the Year: Jenna Cumming

=== 2005 ===
- Album of the Year: Magnificent Seven by Blazin' Fiddles
- Club of the Year: Glenfarg Folk Club
- Composer of the Year: Charlie McKerron
- Community Project of the Year: Lochgoilhead Fiddle Workshop
- Event of the Year: Blazin' in Beauly
- Gaelic Singer of the Year: Julie Fowlis
- Instrumentalist of the Year: Aaron Jones
- Live Act of the Year: Peatbog Faeries
- Media Award: Aig Cridhe Ar Ciuil (At the Heart of our Music is Song)
- Scots Singer of the Year: Jim Reid
- Scottish Dance Band of the Year: Gordon Shand and his Scottish Dance Band
- Scottish Folk Band of the Year: Back of the Moon
- Scottish Pipe Band of the Year: The House of Edgar Shotts & Dykehead Pipe Band
- Services to Industry Award: MusicScotland
- The McEwan's Sessions Venue of the Year: Hootananny, Inverness
- Up and Coming Artist of the Year: Jenna Reid

=== 2004 ===
- Album of the Year: Fire & Grace by Alasdair Fraser & Natalie Haas
- BBC Radio Scotland Personality of the Year: Fiona Mackenzie
- Community Project of the Year: Feis Rois Traditional Music in Schools project
- Club of the Year: Hootananny, Inverness
- Event of the Year: Hebridean Celtic Festival
- Gaelic Singer of the Year: Maggie MacInnes
- Instrumentalist of the Year: Fred Morrison
- Journalist of the Year: Sue Wilson
- Live Act of the Year: Blazin' Fiddles
- The Media Award: Take the Floor (BBC Radio Scotland)
- Retailer of the Year: Foot Stompin Celtic Music
- Scots Singer of the Year: Dick Gaughan
- Scottish Dance Band of the Year: Da Fustra
- Folk Band of the Year: Old Blind Dogs
- Pipe Band of the Year: Kirkwall City Pipe Band
- Songwriter of the Year: Jim Malcolm
- Up and Coming Band of the Year: Dòchas

=== 2003 ===
- Best Album: Cliar by Cliar
- Best Scots Singer: Karine Polwart
- Best Gaelic Singer: Karen Matheson
- Best Instrumentalist: Phil Cunningham
- Best Scottish Dance Band: Alasdair MacCuish and the Black Rose Ceilidh Band
- Best Pipeband: ScottishPower Pipe Band
- Best Folk Band: Capercaillie
- Best Festival: Celtic Connections
- Best Club: Shetland Accordion Club
- Best Live Act: Battlefield Band
- Best Up and Coming Artist/Band: Back of the Moon
- Radio/TV Show of the year: Travelling Folk, BBC Radio Scotland
- Retailer of the year: Coda Music
- Media Award: The Living Tradition
- Services to Traditional Music: Hamish Henderson
