= Rant (disambiguation) =

A rant or diatribe is a kind of oration.

Rant(s) or The Rant(s) may also refer to:

== Literature ==
- Rant (novel), a 2007 novel by Chuck Palahniuk
- Rants and Incendiary Tracts, 1989 anthology volume by Bob Black and Adam Parfrey
- The Rants, a book by Dennis Miller
- Rant, a type of character in Leven Thumps

== Music ==
- Rant (Ian Hunter album) (2001)
- Rant (The Futureheads album) (2012)
- RANT, Scottish chamber-folk quartet whose members have included Jenna Reid, Lauren MacColl and Gillian Frame
- A lively Scottish tune; see "MacPherson's Rant"
- A traditional dance-step, originating in the UK; see Music of Northumbria

== Other uses ==
- "The Rant", a commercial in the I Am Canadian media campaign for Molson Canadian Beer
- Ranter, member of a seventeenth-century English religious movement

== People with the surname ==
- Christopher Rants (born 1967), American politician from Iowa
- James Rant (1936–2003), British judge and Judge Advocate General
- Thomas Rant (1604–1671), English lawyer and Member of Parliament in 1660
- Zoran Rant (1904–1972), Slovene mechanical engineer, scientist and professor

== See also ==
- RANTES or CCL5, a human protein
- RantMedia, a media organization
