= RURA (band) =

Scottish folk band

- Genres: Scottish folk music, Celtic music
- Years active: 2010-present
- Labels: Greentrax Recordings
- Members: Jack Smedley; Steven Blake; Adam Brown; David Foley
- Past members: Adam Holmes: Chris Waite
- Website: www.rura.co.uk

RURA (sometimes styled as Rura) are a Scottish folk band composed of Jack Smedley, Steven Blake, Adam Brown, and David Foley. The band gained prominence at the Celtic Connections festival starting in 2010. RURA were Danny Kyle Open Stage winners in 2011 at the Celtic Connections festival, and won both "Up and Coming Artist of the Year" in 2011 and "Live Act of the Year" in 2015 at the Scots Trad Music Awards.

== Band members ==
- Jack Smedley – fiddle
- Steven Blake – pipes, whistle, piano
- Adam Brown – guitar
- David Foley – bodhrán, flute

== Discography ==
=== Albums ===
- Break It Up (2012)
- Despite the Dark (2015)
- In Praise of Home (2018)
- Live at the Old Fruitmarket (2020)
- Dusk Moon (2023)

=== EPs ===
- Our Voices Echo (2022)
