= Siobhan Miller =

Scottish Singer

Siobhan Miller is a Scottish folk singer and the only four-time winner of Best Singer at the Scots Trad Music Awards (in 2011, 2013, 2017 and 2020). She also won the Best Traditional Track at the 2018 BBC Radio 2 Folk Awards and has frequently performed at Celtic Connections.

== Discography ==
- In a Bleeze (2008) (with Jeana Leslie)
- Shadows Tall (2010) (with Jeana Leslie)
- Flight of Time (2014)
- Strata (2017)
- Mercury (2018)
- At This Time of Year (2019)
- All Is Not Forgotten (2020)
- Bloom (2022)
- Live Album (2026)

== Early life ==
Siobhan grew up in Penicuik, Midlothian. Her father, Brian, was an active member of the local folk club scene and she travelled round folk festivals with him but it was a teacher at Penicuik High School, Keth Murphy, who nurtured her interest in performing and recording to life.

She moved to Glasgow when she was 18 to attend the Royal Conservatoire of Scotland, developing her craft and reputation as a song writer. .
