= Skerryvore (disambiguation) =

Skerryvore is a reef in Argyll and Bute, Scotland.

Skerryvore may also refer to:

- Skerryvore (band), Scottish nu-folk band based in Glasgow
- Skerryvore, Ontario, a small community in Canada located on the shores of Georgian Bay
- Home of Robert Louis Stevenson, April 1885 - August 1887, in Westbourne, Bournemouth. The building was destroyed by German bombers on 16 November 1940, a memorial garden is now in its place containing a statue of the lighthouse Skerryvore.
