= Peat and Diesel =

Scottish folk band

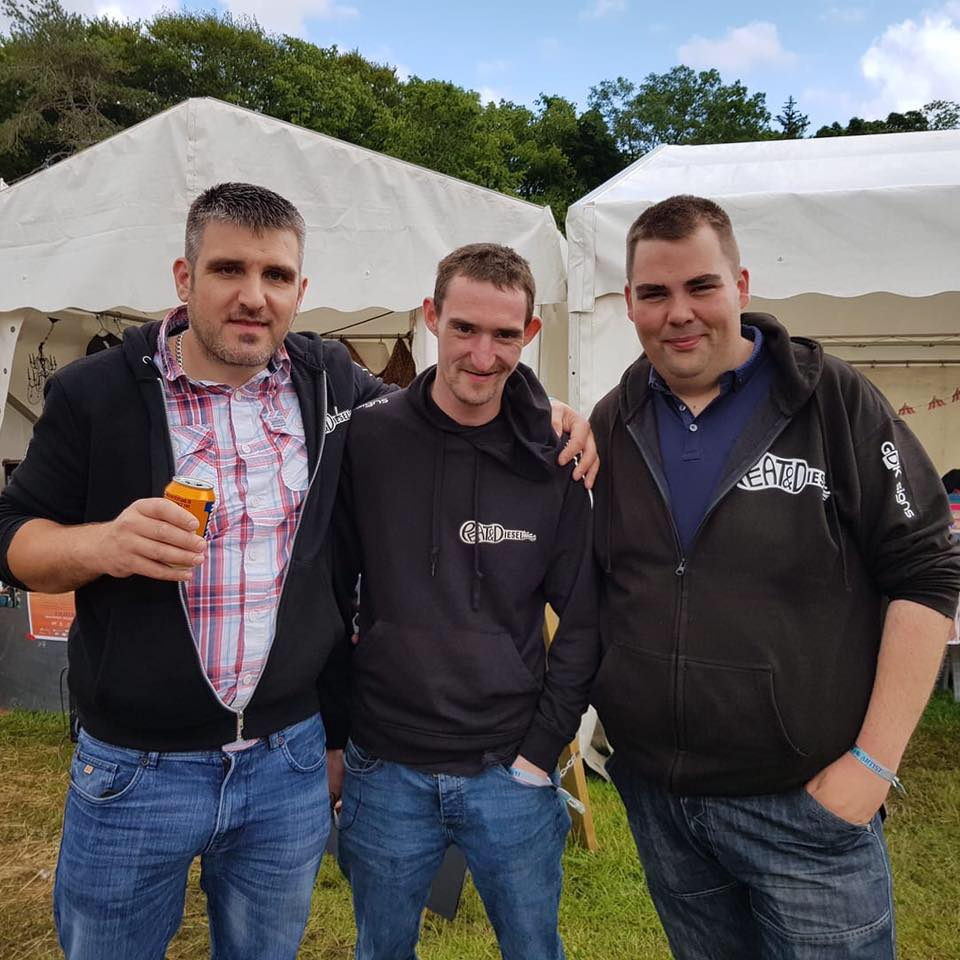
- Innes Scott, Calum ‘Boydie’ Macleod and Uilleam MacLeod. (Left to right)

Background information
- Origin: Stornoway, Isle of Lewis, Scotland
- Genres: Scottish folk * Celtic punk
- Years active: 2018–present
- Labels: Wee Studio Records
- Members: Calum John MacLeod; Innes Scott; Uilly Macleod
- Website: Official website

Peat and Diesel are a three-piece band from Stornoway on the Isle of Lewis, Scotland, comprising Calum “Boydie” MacLeod, Innes Scott and Uilly Macleod. The band formed over Saturday sessions at the band members' homes in Stornoway, and grew in popularity through exposure on social media. The band's songs mostly concern a humorous take on island life, and are predominantly in English, although they include some Gaelic words and phrases.

In 2019, the band won "Live Act of the Year" at the Scots Trad Music Awards. In the 2020 awards they won "Best Music Video" (for Calum Dan’s Transit Van). They were also nominated for best album (for Light my Byre), but lost out to The Woods by Hamish Napier.

In 2022, the band stepped in at short notice to replace Sam Ryder's headline appearance at the Belladrum Tartan Heart Festival after the former Eurovision contestant pulled out due to illness.

In 2024, they headlined the Emirates Arena's first ever gig as part of the Celtic Connections Festival.

== Current members ==
- Calum 'Boydie' MacLeod (guitar and vocals)
- Innes Scott (accordion)
- Uilly Macleod (drums)

== Discography ==
=== Studio albums ===
List of studio albums
| Title | Details | Peak chart positions | |
| Title | Details | SCO | UK |
|---|---|---|---|
| Uptown Fank | Released: 24 May 2019; Label: Wee Studio; Formats: CD, digital download | 12 | — |
| Light My Byre | Released: 24 January 2020; Label: Wee Studio; Formats: CD, digital download | 2 | 27 |
"—" denotes a title that did not chart.

=== Live albums ===
List of live albums
| Title | Details | Peak chart positions |
| Title | Details | SCO |
|---|---|---|
| Live at the Barrowlands 2020 | Released: 25 January 2021; Label: Wee Studio; Formats: CD, digital download | 4 |
