= Jenn Butterworth =

Scottish folk guitarist and singer

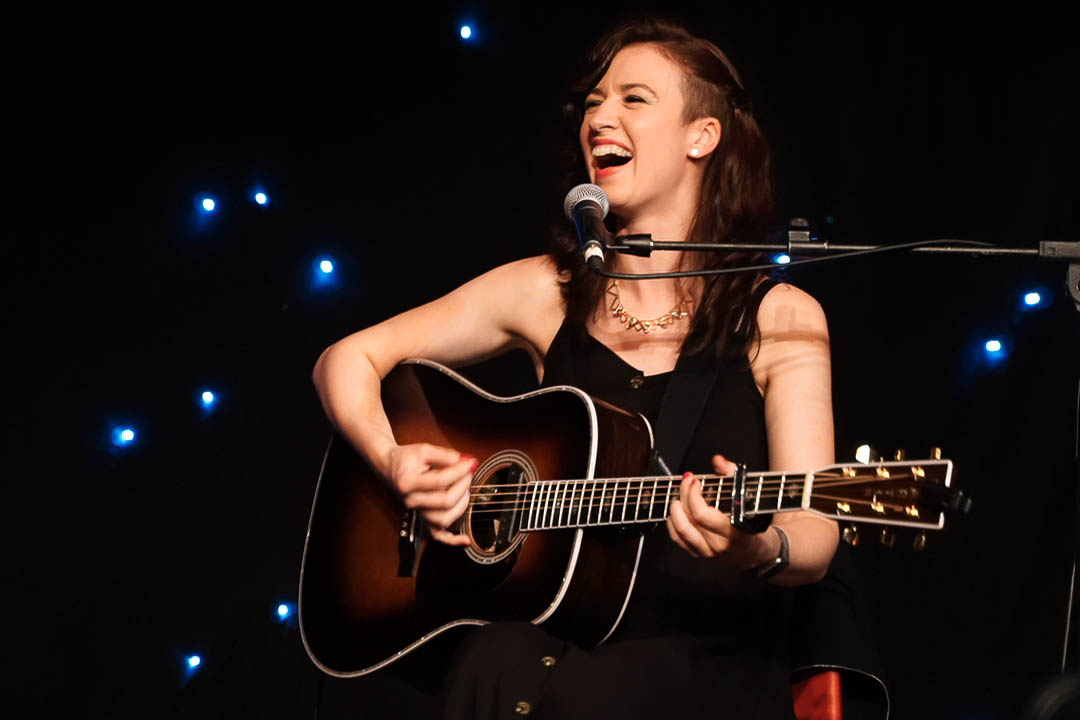
- Jenn Butterworth at the Arran Folk Festival, June 2019

Background information
- Born: 1983 (age 42–43); Halifax, West Yorkshire, England
- Origin: Glasgow, Scotland
- Genres: Scottish folk music
- Instruments: guitar, singing
- Years active: 2003–present
- Website: jennbutterworth.co.uk

Jennifer Butterworth, known as Jenn Butterworth, is an acoustic folk guitarist and singer based in Glasgow, Scotland, who was awarded the title "Musician of the Year" at the 2019 Scots Trad Music Awards, and was nominated for the same title at the 2019 BBC Radio 2 Folk Awards. She was a founder member of Kinnaris Quintet, who won the Belhaven Bursary for Innovation in Scottish Music at the 2019 Scots Trad Music Awards.

== Early life ==
Butterworth was born in Halifax, West Yorkshire and grew up near Whithorn, Dumfries and Galloway. She had fiddle lessons at school from the age of eleven, and started to teach herself the guitar from about the age of thirteen. She would go to festivals with her father and play in sessions. At first she played fiddle in sessions, but then started to sing, accompanying herself on the guitar. In 2000 she moved to Glasgow to study the BA (Hons) Applied Music at the University of Strathclyde, and has remained in Glasgow.

== Career ==
Butterworth had started playing with Anna Massie while they were both students and for the first few years after graduating she was recording and touring as part of Massie's band. She was a member of the Rachel Hair Trio, has made two albums with Claire Hastings, and has numerous studio and live accompaniment credits, including having accompanied Liz Carroll at the 2019 Scots Fiddle Festival. In 2015 Butterworth was part of the music project Songs of Separation, together with ten women folk musicians from Scotland and England including Eliza Carthy, Karine Polwart and Mary Macmaster. Their album, created in just six days on the Isle of Eigg, won the 'Best Album' category in the 2017 BBC Radio 2 Folk Awards.

She is the regular accompanist for fiddler Ryan Young, a partnership which began when Young was a student at the Royal Conservatoire of Scotland where Butterworth is a lecturer, and had nobody to accompany him for his final performance. Young is known for his virtuosic and semi-improvised performance, so when Butterworth accompanies him she may know what tune he is going to play but not how many times through, or with what variations and key changes. She has to improvise in the moment, which she thinks makes the performance more exciting, at the same time holding to Young's preferred harmonies, which can be quite proscriptive. She comments "You have to give and take a lot with your accompanist, a conversation".

In contrast to the projects in which she is an accompanist, Butterworth considers her duo with Laura-Beth Salter, mandolin player and singer with a background in old-time and bluegrass, to be central to Butterworth's own creative output. The duo showcases the two musicians' eclectic influences and interests. Colin Irwin in his Guardian review of Jenn and Laura-Beth's 2017 album Bound called Butterworth an "outstanding guitarist" and noted the duo's "clever, intricate, genuinely exciting and perfectly executed instrumental tunes". Dave Beeby's review for The Living Tradition praises the clarity of the two voices, and how well they blend together.

The partnership of Butterworth and Salter also led to the creation of Kinnaris Quintet, comprising the duo and three fiddlers, Aileen Reid, Laura Wilkie and Fiona MacAskill. The band has an energetic driving sound, which Butterworth supports with a stomp box and various effects pedals. The fRoots magazine review of their debut album Free One (2018) observed the key contribution of Butterworth's guitar: "the Butterworth rhythmic powerhouse pushes things on with a restless urgency that keeps you on the edge of your seat". Kinnaris Quintet was awarded the 2019 Belhaven Bursary for Innovation in Scottish Music. At £25,000, the bursary is the largest music prize in Scotland, equalled only by the Mercury Prize.

Butterworth met harmonica player Will Pound at a folk session in 2018. Their live improvisations during the subsequent COVID-19 lockdowns became a 'viral TikTok sensation' according to Newbury Today. They released their first album, A Day Will Come, in 2020.

Since summer 2018, Butterworth has played a Martin D-41 Standard Series Sunburst guitar. She almost always plays in standard tuning.

== Teaching ==
In 2012, Butterworth was appointed Lecturer in Practical Studies in the Traditional Music department of the Royal Conservatoire of Scotland, where she teaches guitar and ensemble. She also teaches guitar at the Glasgow Folk-music Workshop and the Scottish Music Academy. She is musical director of the Hidden Lane Choir, a women's community choir in Glasgow.

Butterworth was the winner in the Scots Trad Music Awards category "Music Tutor of the Year" in 2015.

== Campaigning ==
Butterworth is on the board of The BIT Collective, an organisation dedicated to overcoming equalities issues in the Scottish traditional arts, which created the #TradStandsWithHer campaign to call out sexual harassment in the Scottish traditional music scene. She has organised events including the "Woman Stays On" open mic sessions in which every act must include at least one woman.

== Discography ==
Tracks re-issued on compilations are not listed.

With Anna Massie
- 2003 Glad Company
- 2006 The Missing Gift

With the Rachel Hair Trio
- 2012 No More Wings
- 2015 Trì

With Claire Hastings
- 2016 Between River and Railway
- 2019 Those Who Roam

With Laura-Beth Salter
- 2013 Breathe
- (as "Jenn and Laura-Beth") 2017 Bound

With Kinnaris Quintet
- 2018 Free One

Other collaborations

- 2016 Songs of Separation project: Songs of Separation
- 2017 Mac Ìle: The Music of Fraser Shaw, charity tribute album
- 2020 Will Pound: A Day Will Come, a project exploring the music of all 27 European Union countries
- 2020 Ross Ainslie and Ali Hutton: Symbiosis III
- 2020 David Foley and Jack Smedley (of Rura): Time to Fly
