= Calum Stewart =

Scottish musician

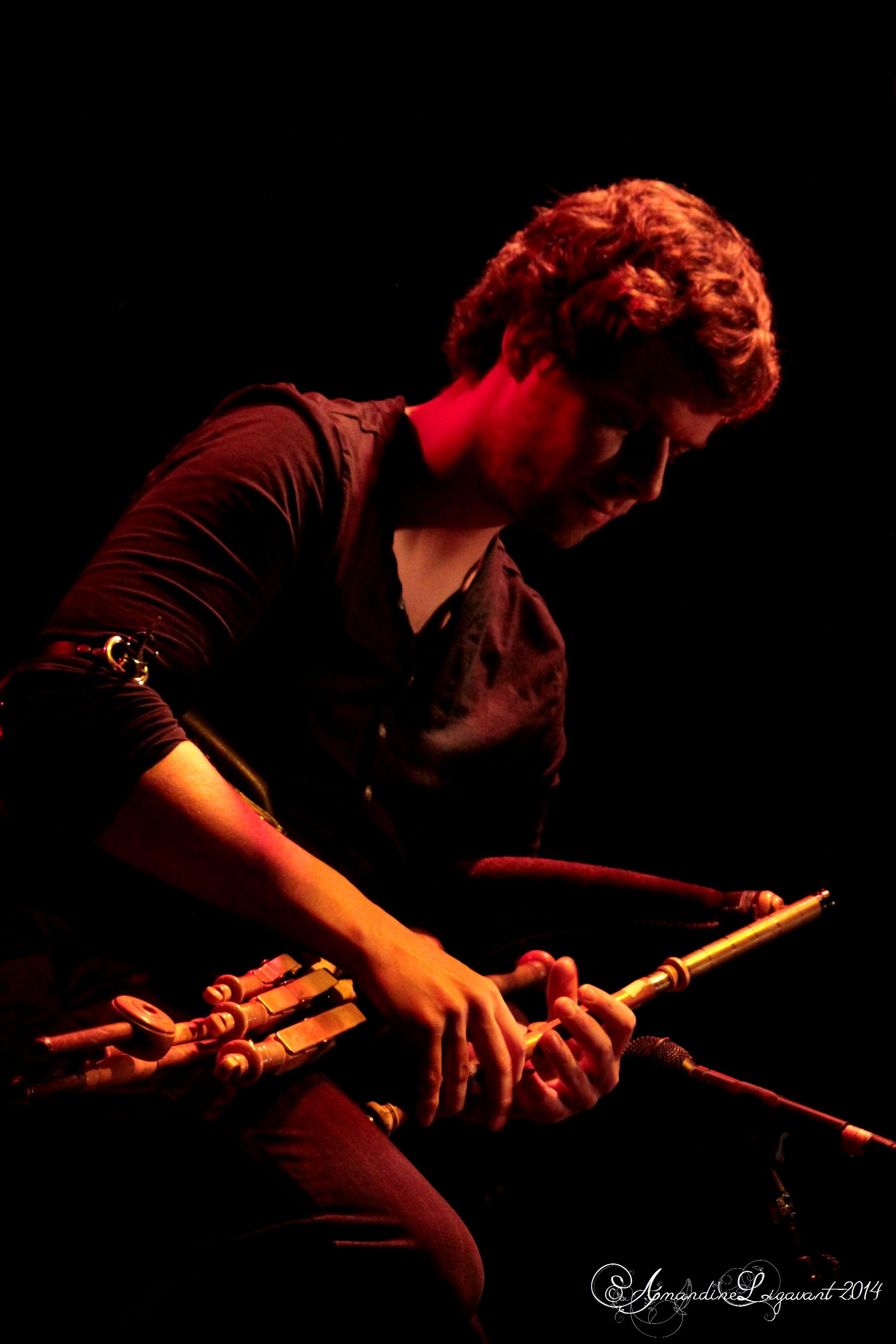

Background information
- Origin: Moray, Scotland
- Genres: Traditional Scottish music, Celtic, Folk
- Instruments: Uileann pipes, wooden flute, low whistle
- Partner: Sophie Stephenson (since April 2023)
- Website: www.calum-stewart.com

Calum Stewart (born 1982) is a Scottish musician and composer who is a uilleann piper, low whistle and wooden flute player, who performs primarily traditional Scottish and Irish music.

== Career ==
Brought up in a musical household, Calum Stewart's playing style is rooted in the traditional music of his native northern Scotland. His distinct musical voice has been developed through collaborations within the Scottish and Irish traditions.

In demand as a concert and recording artist, Calum has recorded and performed with The London Philharmonic Orchestra, The London Symphony Orchestra and Nitin Sawhney.

Calum Stewart regularly performs with Breton guitarist Heikki Bourgault.

Since 2014, he is also a member of the Band of Angelo Kelly (Kelly Family) and performs with him on his tours, Irish Christmas and Irish Summer. He also worked with Angelo Kelly on his studio Albums Irish Christmas (2016) and Irish Heart (2018).

== Personal life ==
Calum got engaged to Scottish step dancer, Sophie Stephenson, in a cave at Clashach Cove on the Moray Coast in April 2023.

== Instruments ==
- Wooden Flute (aka Irish Flute)
- Uilleann pipes
- Whistle (aka Tin whistle)
- Low Whistle

== Discography ==
=== Calum Stewart albums ===
- Earlywood (2008, Earlywood Music)
- Tales from the North (2017)
- True North (2023)

=== Calum Stewart & Heikki Bourgault albums ===
- Calum Stewart & Heikki Bourgault (2010, Legba Prod)
- Hunter's Moon (2014, Full Spate Music)

=== Other recording collaborations ===
- Wooden Flute and Fiddle (Calum Stewart and Lauren MacColl) 2012 Make Believe Records
- North by East (Calum Stewart and Gareth Davies-Jones) 2012 Heading West Music

=== Other recordings ===
Calum Stewart has also appeared on:

- OK Pewter (Mabon), 2007 Easy on the Records
- Bridges (Katie Doherty), 2007 Park Records
- Live at the Grand Pavilion (Mabon), 2010 Easy on the Records
- Mànran (Mànran), 2011 Mànran records
- Windblown (Jamie Smith's Mabon), 2012 Easy on the Records
- Manannan's Cloak (Barrule), 2015 Easy on the Records
- Irish Christmas (Angelo Kelly), 2016 Flowfish records
- Irish Heart (Angelo Kelly), 2018 Electrola
