= Tiree Music Festival =

Annual folk music festival in Scotland

Coordinates: 56.483°N 6.884°W

Tiree Music Festival is a Scottish folk music festival held annually on the Island of Tiree in the Inner Hebrides. The festival was founded in 2010 by resident Stewart MacLennan and local musician Daniel Gillespie of the band Skerryvore. It has received several awards from the Scottish tourism industry: Best Small Festival by Scottish Events Awards in 2012 and 2013; and 2013 Best Cultural Event by Highland and Island Tourism and Scottish Thistle Awards.

In August 2013, the weekend festival was attended by more than 1500 people. It incorporates three stages: an open air main stage, a marquee-housed community village stage and an indoor ceilidh stage.

On 6 July 2023, organisers cancelled the 2023 festival a day before events were scheduled to begin because of "extreme weather".
