= Breabach =

Scottish folk group

Breabach is a Scottish folk music band formed in 2005. In 2011, they received nominations for ‘Best Group’ at the BBC Radio 2 Folk Awards. They won Scottish Folk Band of the Year in 2012 and Live Act of the Year in 2013 at the Scots Trad Music Awards (Na Trads).

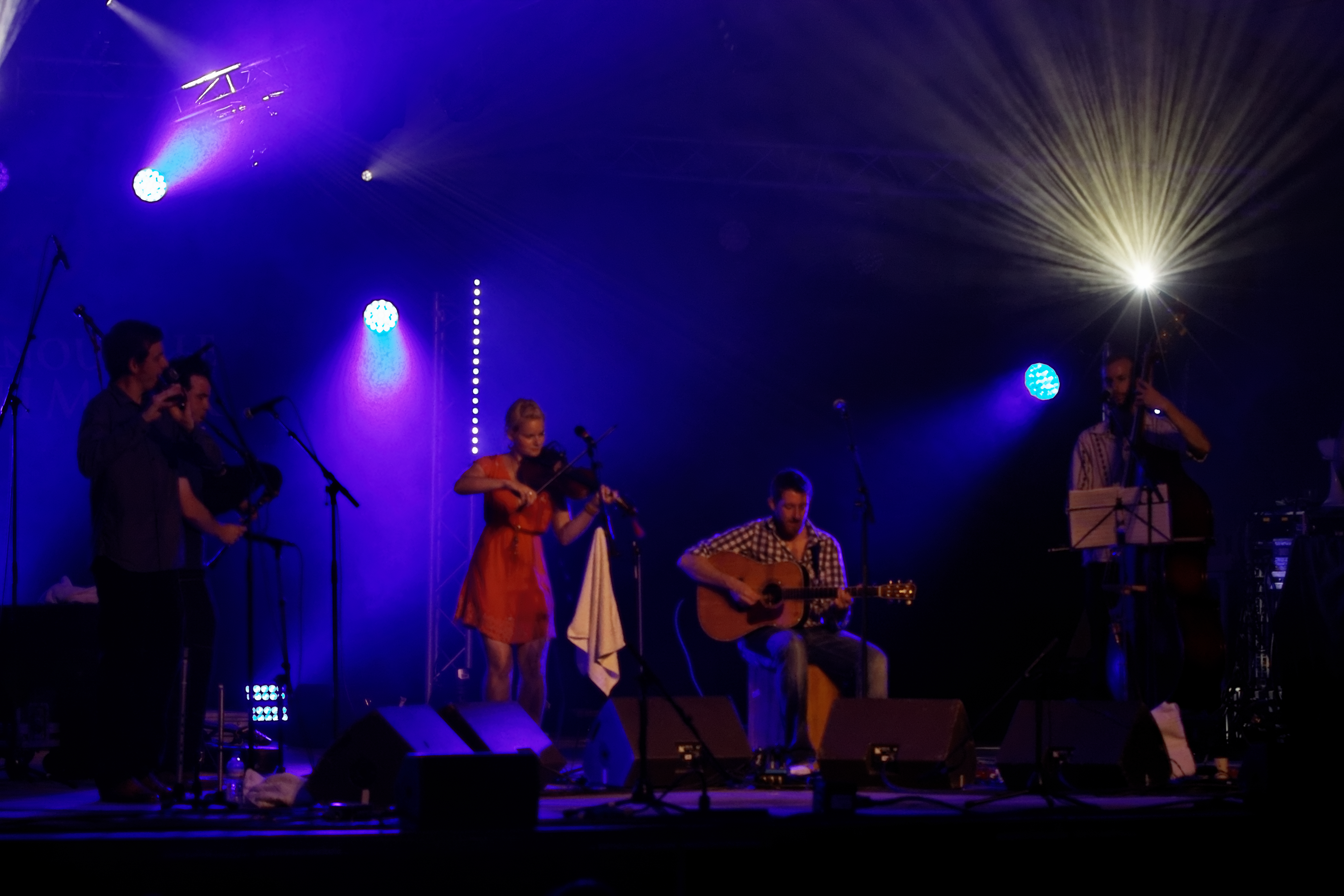

== Members ==
- Calum MacCrimmon – pipes, whistles, bouzouki, vocals
  MacCrimmon graduated with honours from the Royal Scottish Academy of Music and Drama. He is currently a member of Breabach, Mans Ruin, The Unusual Suspects, Seudan and RTK9000. From 2004 to 2008 he was acting musical co-director/accompanist/tutor for The National Youth Pipe Band of Scotland.
- Megan Henderson – fiddle, vocals
  Henderson is from Fort William. She is involved with the Feisean movement, playing at festivals including Celtic Colours, Canada, Celtic Connections, Scotland and Blas, also in Scotland. Henderson moved to Glasgow in 2007 to study at the Royal Scottish Academy of Music and Drama. She currently plays with Salsa Celtica.
- Ewan Robertson – guitar, cajon, vocals
  Robertson became interested in guitar and song whilst studying at Sgoil Chiùil na Gàidhealtachd. He was awarded the BBC Radio Scotland Young Traditional Musician award in 2008.
- James Lindsay – double bass, vocals
  Lindsay comes from Inverurie in the heart of Aberdeenshire. He graduated with Honours in 2011 from Strathclyde University in Glasgow with a BA Applied Music degree. He combines playing with the band and working as a session musician.
- Conal McDonagh - pipes, whistles, vocals

=== Past members ===
- James Duncan Mackenzie – pipes, flute, whistles
  Mackenzie is from Back in the Isle of Lewis. He has a BA(Hons) in Scottish Music, specializing in piping at the Royal Scottish Academy of Music and Drama. He played with the ScottishPower Pipe Band for two years.
- Patsy Reid - Fiddle, viola, and cello
  Reid is from Perthshire.
- Donal Brown – whistles, flutes, highland bagpipe

== Discography ==
=== Studio albums ===
- The Big Spree (2007)
- The Desperate Battle of the Birds (2010)
- Bann (2012)
- Ùrlar (2013)
- Astar (2016)
- Frenzy of the Meeting (2018)
- Dùsgadh (2021) Soundtrack album to the animated film Dùsgadh
- Fàs (2022)

== Performances ==
The band has performed at events such as Fairport's Cropredy Convention, Isle of Skye Music Festival, Shrewsbury Folk Festival, the Edinburgh Fringe, the Festival Interceltique de Lorient and WOMAD. It has received reviews in numerous publications including Songlines, fRoots and The Scotsman. The band performed at the first ever international performance of the Grand Ole Opry at the Royal Albert Hall on 26 September 2025.
