= Rachel Walker (singer) =

- Born: 1976 (age 49–50); Salisbury, Wiltshire, England
- Genre: Folk
- Instruments: Singing and piano
- Years active: 2004–present
- Label: Skipinnish Records
- Website: www.rachelwalker.co.uk

Rachel Walker (born 1976) is an English-born singer of Scottish Gaelic folk music, having performed and recorded as a solo artist as well as in bands, such as Skipinnish.

Born in Salisbury, she moved to Wester Ross at age eight, and attended Kinlochewe Primary School and Gairloch High School, learning Gaelic song and traditional music. Regular attendance at Fèis Rois nurtured her interest in Gaelic song and Rachel became known as a performer at local cèilidh's and events.

On leaving school, Walker completed a course in Classical music at Napier University and in 1996, she was accepted as one of the first students on the brand new Scottish music course at the Royal Scottish Academy of Music and Drama where she studied Gaelic song under the tutelage of the renowned Gaelic singer Kenna Campbell.

Rachel went on to performances on Gaelic television, including Tacsi, Togaidh Sinn Fonn and Seirm. She toured Scotland with her own band, and in 2008 was invited to support Runrig on their UK winter tour.

Three times nominated as Gaelic Singer of the year in the Scottish Traditional Music Awards, she was voted the winner in 2013.

She has been a long time member of the band Skipinnish, singing, touring and recording with the band since their set up in 2000. She has recorded on every one of their studio albums, as lead singer or backing vocalist, and performed with them at Edinburgh Castle in July 2023 and the OVO Hydro in September 2025

== Songwriting ==
Walker showcased her songwriting capabilities on her album 'Air Chall' in 2010, and since then has continued to write in both Gaelic and English, with her songs being highly acclaimed. She represented Scotland at the Liet International Song Contest in 2010, and her song 'The Arms of the Ocean' Featuring Skerryvore singer Alec Dalglish reached number 1 in the World Music chart.

Rachel collaborated with the Fasanta Festival, linked with Dunollie Castle to create three stage works - Clò,based on the traditions of waulking the tweed, Fìghe, celebrating weaving, and Seudan, telling the story of the brooch of Lorne, which was also showcased at the Celtic Connections Festival. She was commissioned to write a new song 'Uisge' for the Blas festival in 2020, as well as a song 'Cantus Benedictus' celebrating Christopher Columbus for CHARTS.

She has collaborated with Tiree poet Flora MacPhail, as well as long term writing partner and poet Marcas Mac an Tuairneir.

Her 2020 album Gaol continued to showcase her skills as a songwriter and brought to the forefront her writing partnership with Marcas Mac an Tuairner, with songs such as Là Luain and Tìr is Sàl winning high praise.

In 2021 she began a writing and musical partnership with accompanist and singer Aaron Jones, first releasing an EP A Happy Place in 2022. Following this they released two more albums - Despite the Wind and Rain, featuring new songs celebrating the achievements of women in Scottish history and Amongst the Wild Rowans focusing on traditional songs.

== Work with Gaelic Choirs ==
In 2013, Rachel was invited to be the conductor of newly formed Còisir Ghàidhlig Lochaber with the aim of competing at the Royal National Mòd in Lochaber in 2017. The choir first competed in Oban in 2015, winning the Margrat Duncan Competition on their debut appearance. Under Rachel's leadership, the choir continued their success, winning the competition twice more, in Stornoway in 2016 and Lochaber in 2017, where Rachel also won the premier prize for solo singing - the An Comunn Gàidhealach Gold Medal.

Rachel stepped down as conductor of the choir in 2022 following covid and now focuses mush of her work on creating bespoke arrangements for competing Gaelic choirs at the highest level. She has arranged for choirs such as Atomaig Piseag, Còisir Ghàidhlig Thaigh an Uillt, Lothian Ladies Choir, Aberdeen Ladies Choir and Còisir Ghàidhlig an Eilean Dhuibh. Most recently she has formed a working relationship wih Ceòlraidh Ghàidhlig Ghlaschu, arranging pieces for the choir competing in the premier choral competition the Lovat and Tullibardine. Her arrangement of Tha mi Sgìth an Fhògair Seo in 2025 was a seminal moment in the choral world, securing a prestigious win for the choir, which was consolidated with an epic arrangement of Gur' Muladach Sgìth Mi / Thèid mi le'm Dheòin bringing Ceòlraidh Ghàidhlig Glaschu a home win at the Glasgow Mòd in 2026.

== Discography ==
- Skipinnish - Skipinnish (2001)
- Sgurr Mòr to Skerryvore - Skipinnish (2003)
- Braighe Loch Iall - Rachel Walker(2004)
- Fon Reul-Sholus - Rachel Walker (2006).
- Sound of the Summer - Skipinnish (2006)
- Air Chall - Rachel Walker (2010)
- Cruinn - Cruinn (2012)
- Atlantic Roar - Skipinnish (2013)
- Stòras - Cruinn (2014)
- Western Ocean - Skipinnish (2014)
- The Arms of the Ocean (Feat Alec Dalglish) - Single (2015)
- Seventh Wave - Skipinnish (2017)
- Tàladh Chrìosda - Rachel Walker - Single (2017)
- Steer by the Stars - Skipinnish (2019)
- Gaol - Rachel Walker (2020)
- A Happy Place - Rachel Walker and Aaron Jones (2021)
- Despite The Wind And Rain - Rachel Walker and Aaron Jones (2022)
- Amongst The Wild Rowans - Rachel Walker & Aaron Jones (2024)
- Fo Reul Iùil Dhubh - Rachel Walker - Single (2026)

== Personal Life ==
Rachel lives in the North West of Scotland, near Fort William. She works for UHI NWH as a music lecturer and at the National Centre of Excellence in Traditional Music in Plockton.

She is divorced and has two grown children.
