= Blazin' Fiddles =

Scottish fiddle band

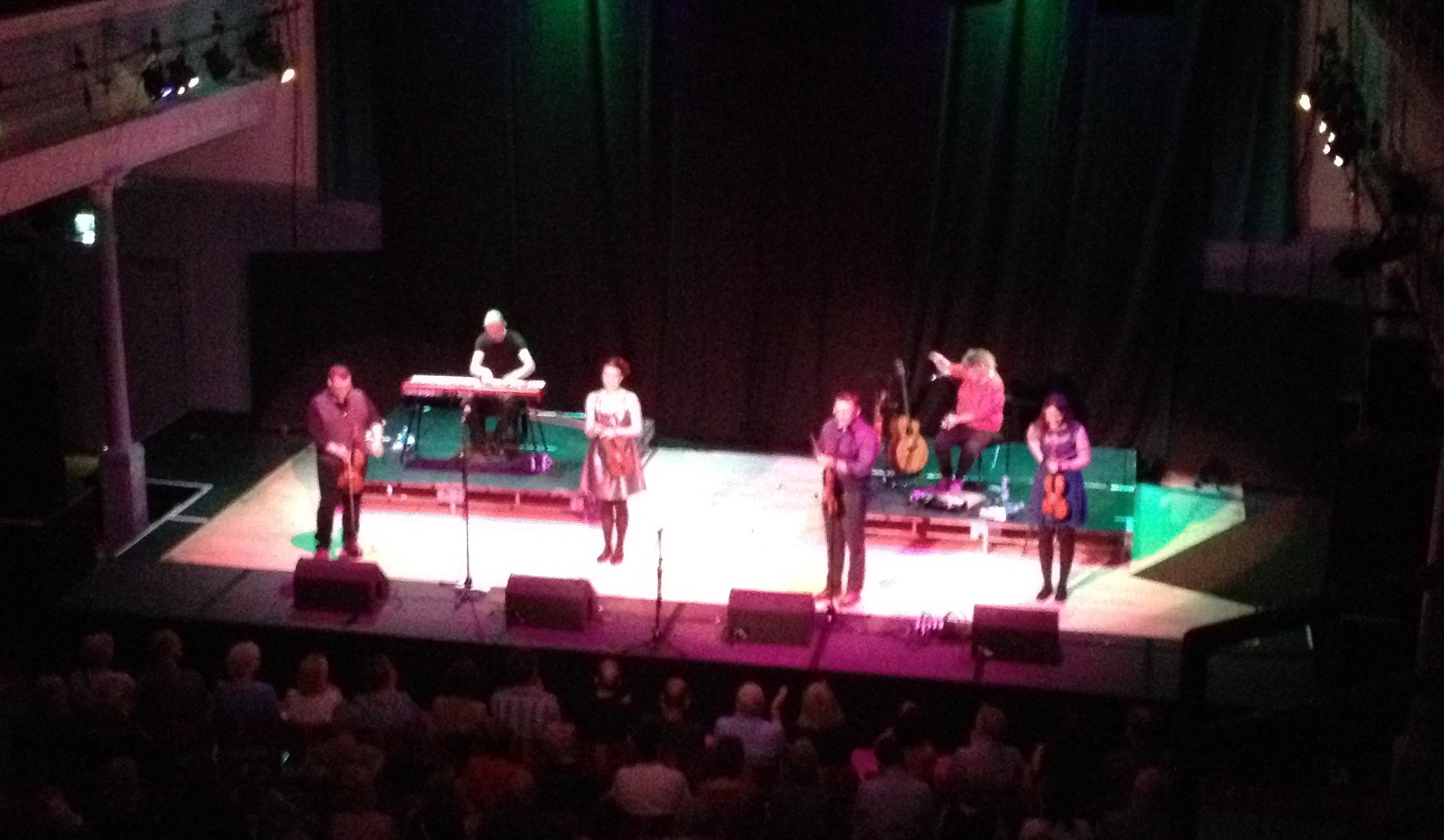
Blazin' Fiddles performing at the Queen's Hall at the Edinburgh Festival 2016

Blazin' Fiddles are a contemporary Scottish fiddle band from the Highlands and Islands. They formed in 1998 to showcase Scotland's distinct regional fiddle styles. The band have a number of awards, including; the MG ALBA Scots Trad Music Awards Live Act of the Year, Album of the Year and Folk Band of the Year. Their records are released on their own indie Blazin' Records label. They have been described as "...the Led Zeppelin of the Folk World."

== History ==
As part of the year of Highland Culture in 1998 the band had originally come together to put on a one-off tour to showcase the various fiddle styles of the Highlands and Islands but the audience reception was so enthusiastic they decided to continue. Their name makes reference to the burning of fiddles that was done by the Church in parts of Scotland in the 19th century. In 1999 they were invited to the Fiddlers of the World festival in Halifax, Nova Scotia. At the Scots Trad music awards they were awarded Best Live Act in 2004, their Album Magnificent Seven was Album of the Year in 2005, and they were Folk Band of the Year in 2013 and 2019. They took part in the BBC Proms at the Albert Hall, London in August 2005.

Of the original line-up, Aidan O'Rourke and Marc Clement left in 2009 and Catriona Macdonald departed from the band in autumn 2010. They were replaced by the Shetland fiddler Jenna Reid, award-winning guitarist Anna Massie and Young Trad winner Kirsten Harvey. The Scotsman newspaper described them as "...the Led Zeppelin of the Folk World." They played at the Edinburgh Festival Fringe. the world's largest arts festival, in 2016 and (with singer Emily Smith) in 2019.

The album Six was the final recording that features Iain MacFarlane and Allan Henderson, who were both founder members of Blazin' Fiddles.

Blazin' Fiddles has been described as one of the world's most prolific fiddle groups.

== Line-up (2026) ==
- Kristan Harvey from Orkney on fiddle.
- Ruaridh Macmillan from Nairn on fiddle.
- Jenna Reid from Shetland on fiddle.
- Anna Massie from Fortrose on guitar and fiddle.
- Angus Lyon from Biggar on piano.

== Blazin' in Beauly ==
- Blazin' in Beauly is an event which has taken place every October since 2000 in a village in the highlands called Beauly. Participants come for one week of fiddle workshops, masterclasses, concerts, sessions and singing. It is open to all ages and levels, and participants can bring their own instruments such as fiddles, guitars and keyboards. Blazin' in Beauly was nominated for the Community Project of the Year at the 2019 Scots Trad Music Awards.

== Gallery ==
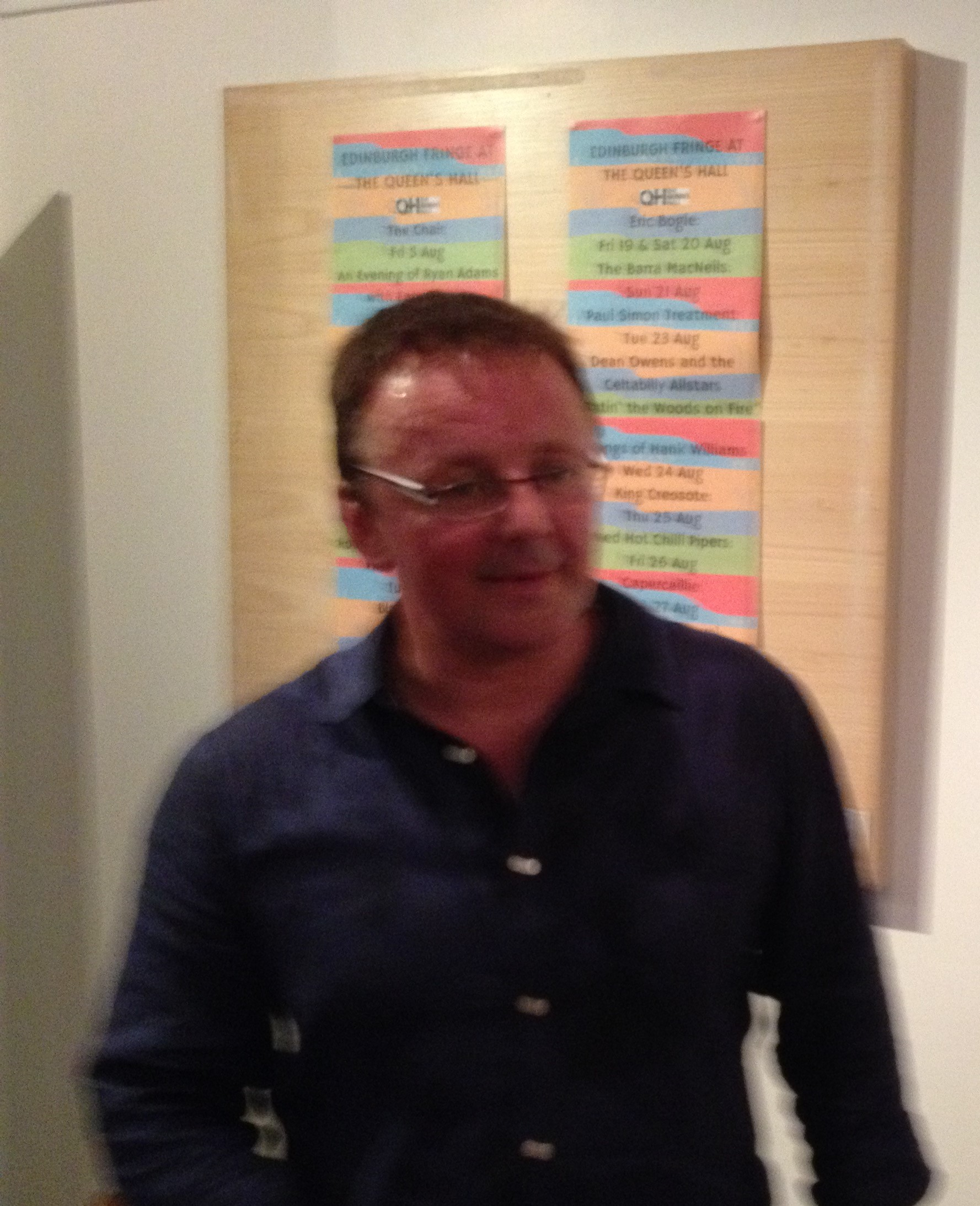
Bruce MacGregor

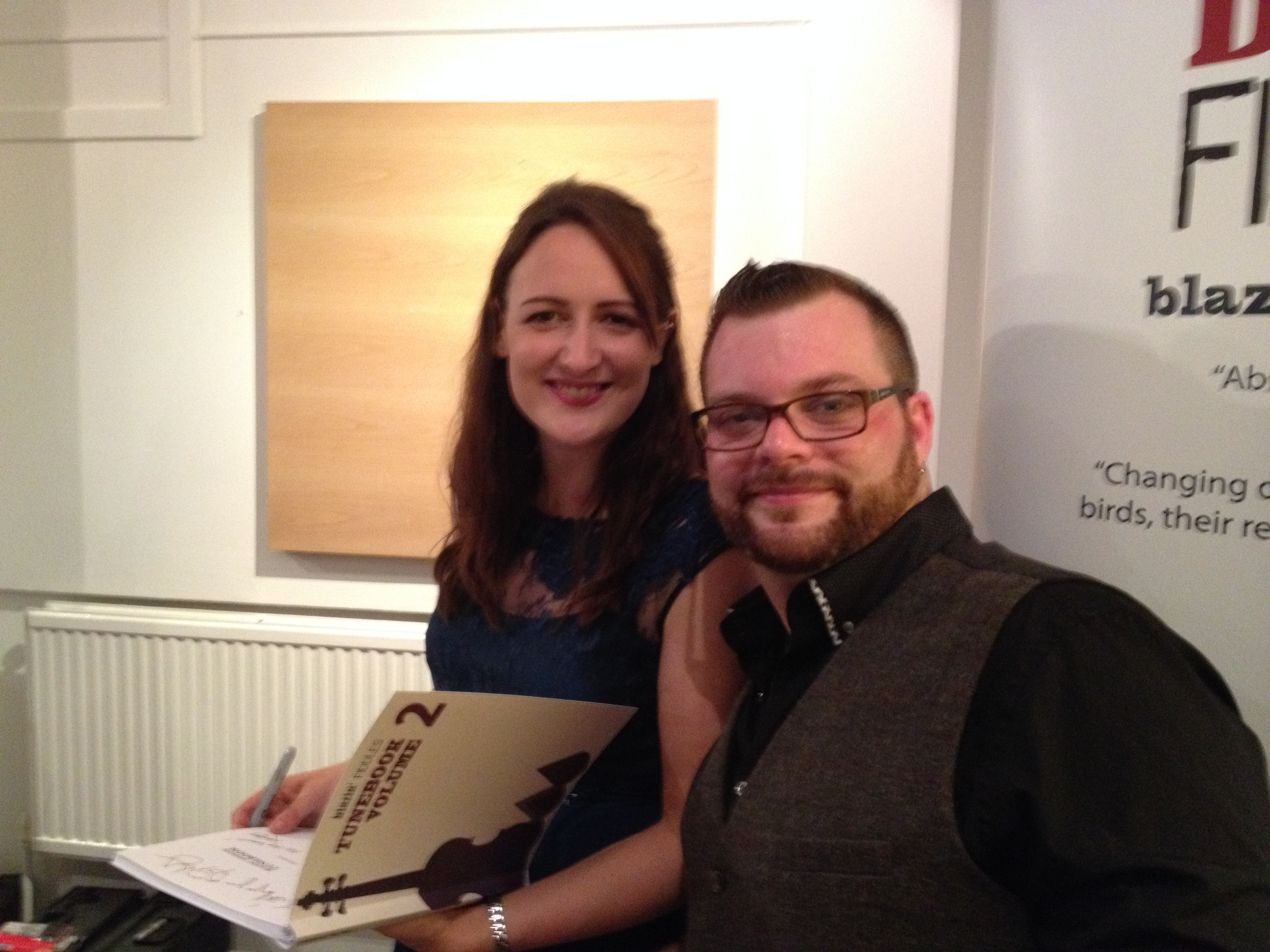
Kristan Harvey & Rua Macmillan

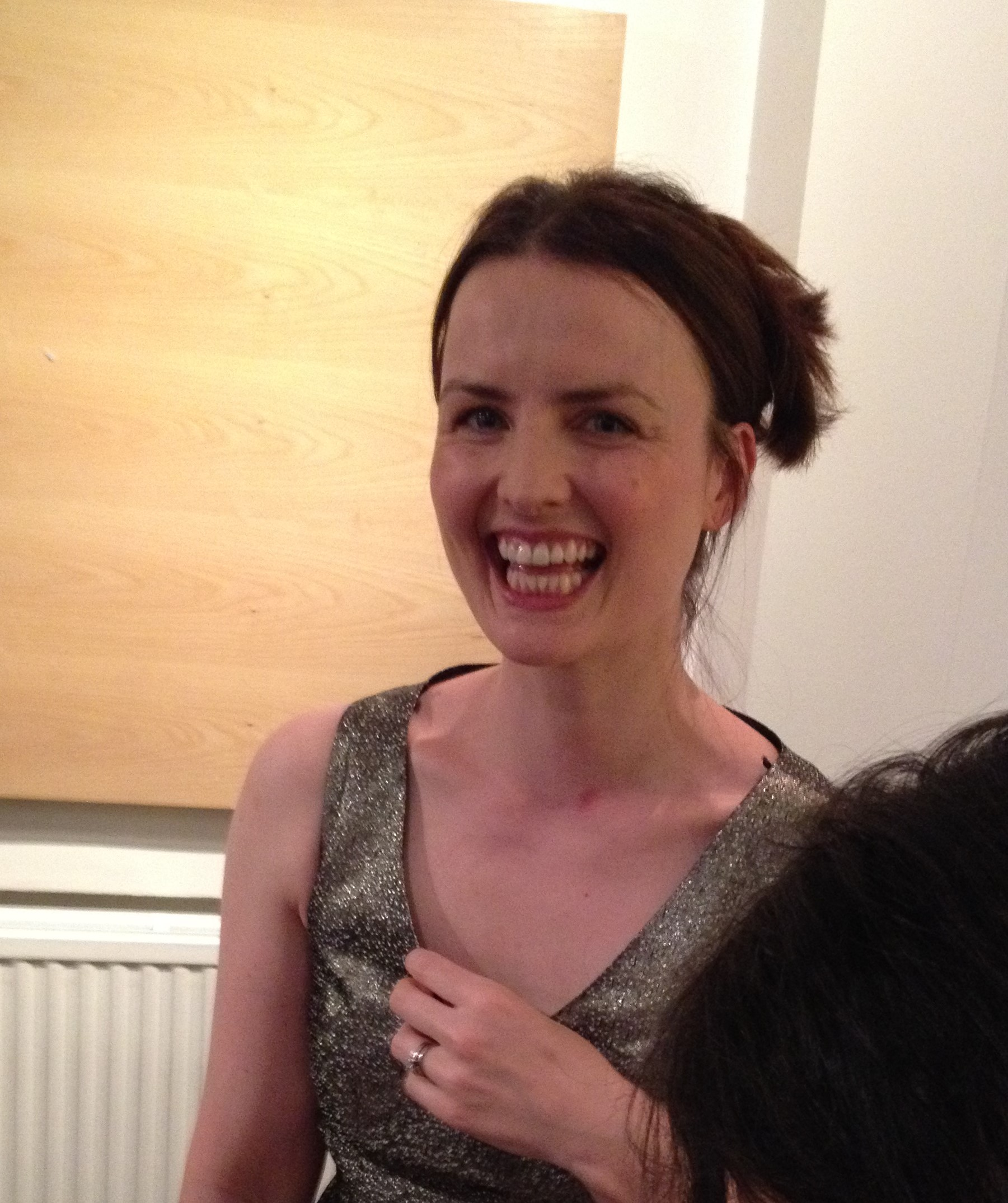
Jenna Reid

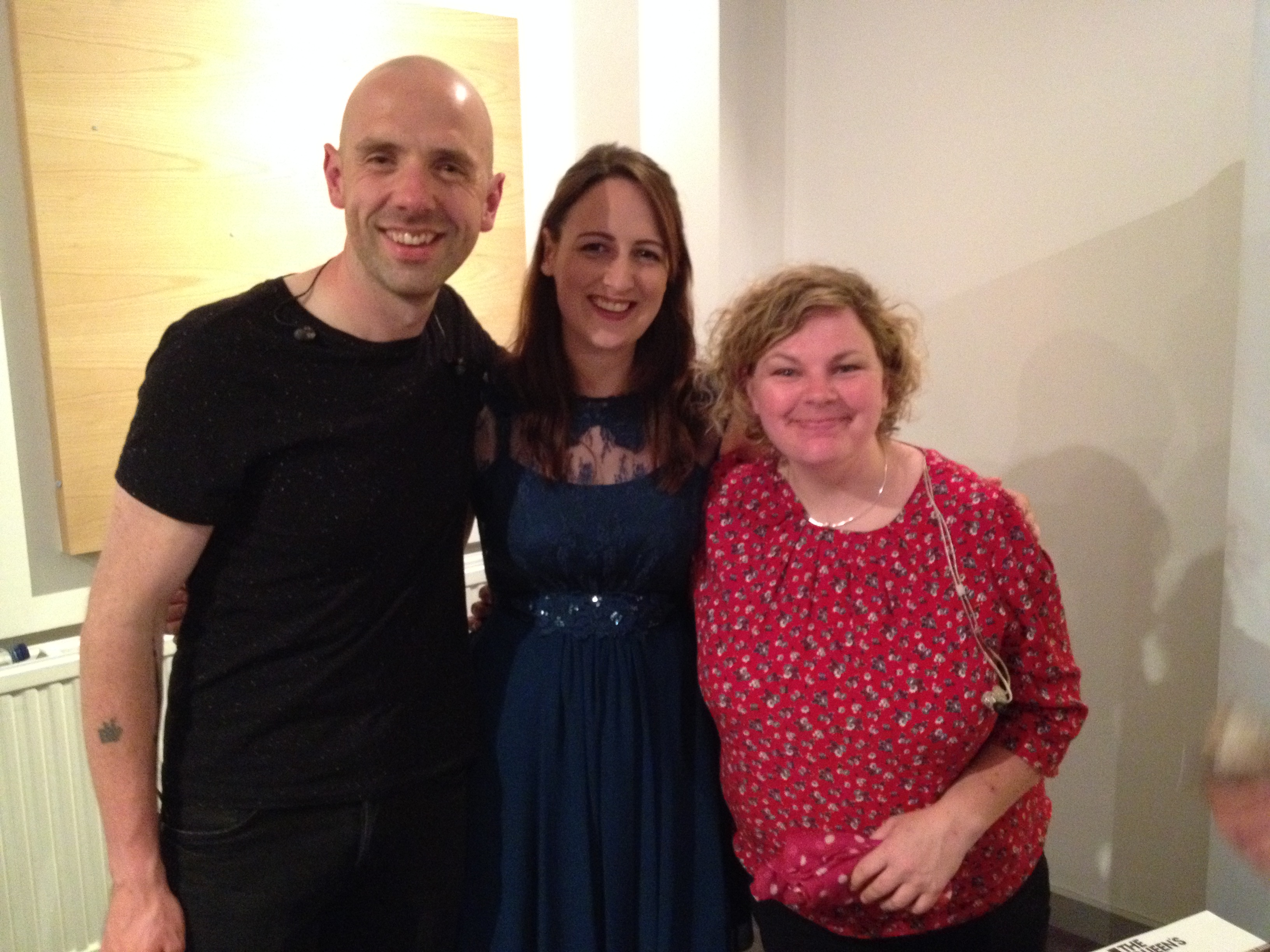
Angus Lyon, Kristan Harvey & Anna Massie

== Past members ==
- Andy Thorburn from Evanton on piano
- Catriona MacDonald from Shetland on fiddle.
- Duncan Chisholm from Kirkhill on fiddle.
- Aidan O'Rourke from Oban on fiddle.
- Marc Clement from Inverness on guitar.
- Allan Henderson from Mallaig on fiddle
- Iain MacFarlane from Glenfinnan on fiddle
- Bruce MacGregor from Inverness on fiddle

== Discography ==
- Fire On! (2000)
- The Old Style (2002)
- Magnificent Seven (2005)
- Blazin' Fiddles Live (2007)
- Thursday Night in the Caley (2011)
- Six (2013)
- Solo (2014)
- North (2015)
- The Key (2017)
- XXV (2023)
- Incendo (2025/6)
