= Malinky =

Scottish folk band

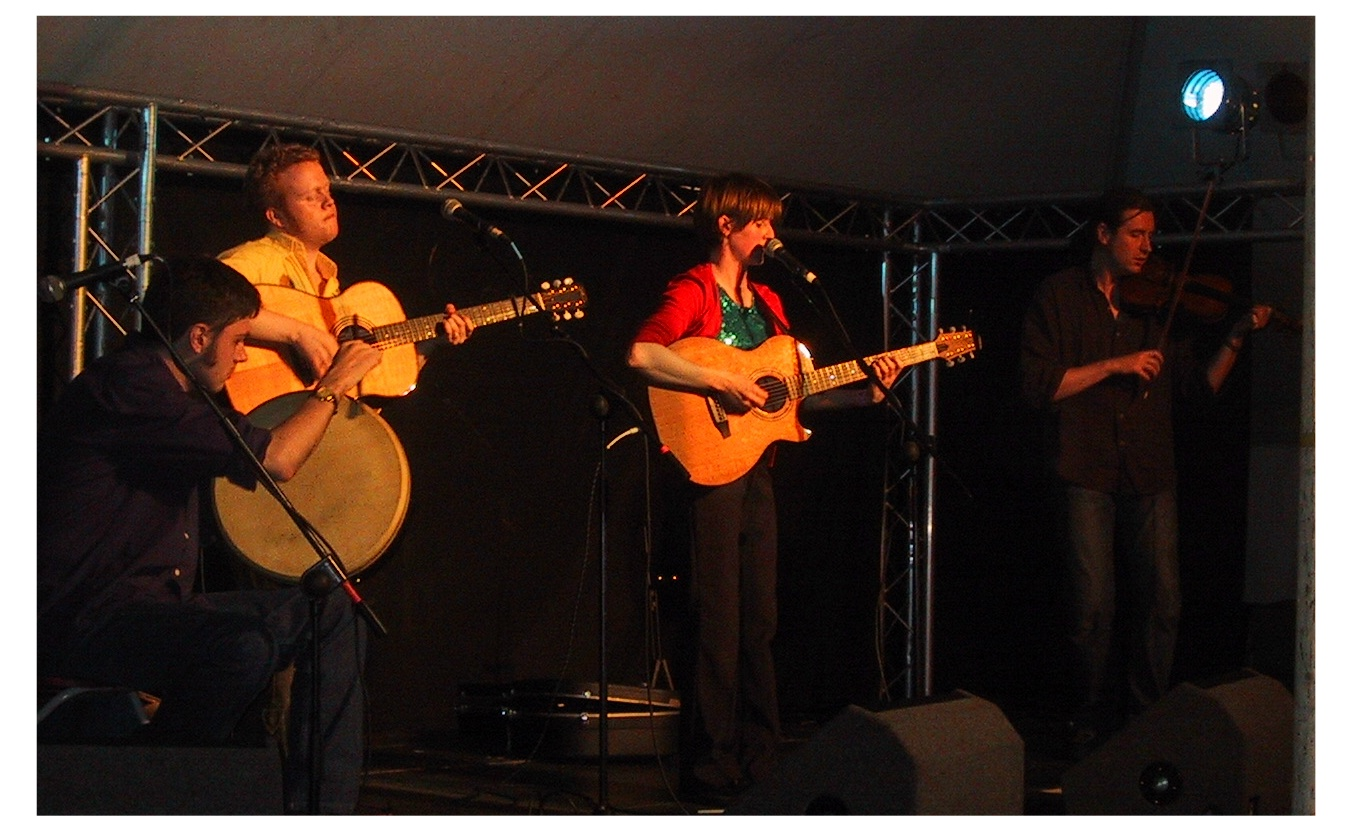
- Malinky performing at Towersey Festival in 2001

Background information
- Origin: Edinburgh, Scotland
- Genre: Folk
- Years active: 1998–present
- Labels: Greentrax Recordings, Mad River
- Members: Steve Byrne (1998–present); Fiona Hunter (2004–present); Mike Vass (2008–2010, 2013–present); Mark Dunlop (1998–2010, 2013–present)
- Past members: Karine Polwart (1998–2005); Leo McCann (2001–2005); Kit Patterson (1998–2001); Jon Bews (2001–2008); Ewan MacPherson (2004–2007); David Wood (2007–2012); Daniel Thorpe (guest fiddler 2010–2011)
- Website: malinky.com

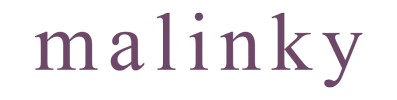
Logo of the band

Malinky is a Scottish folk band specialising in Scots song, formed in autumn 1998.

== Career ==
=== Early years ===
The original members were Karine Polwart from Banknock, Stirlingshire (vocals, guitar, bouzouki), Steve Byrne from Arbroath (vocals, guitar, bouzouki, mandolin), Mark Dunlop from Garryduff, County Antrim (bodhrán, whistles, vocals) and fiddler Kit Patterson from Plymouth, England.

First meeting to rehearse in early October 1998, the band was largely formed to help Polwart fulfil a support slot at Edinburgh Folk Club some ten days later, supporting harpist and storyteller Robin Williamson, formerly of the Incredible String Band. The members had previously encountered each other around the lively pub session scene in Edinburgh in venues such as Sandy Bell's and the Royal Oak bars. Polwart was a social worker, Byrne a student of Scottish Studies, Dunlop a town planner with the city council, and Patterson a computer programmer.

Amidst other instrumental bands at the time, Malinky stood out owing to their almost exclusive concentration on Scots traditional song, as well as Polwart's songwriting talent. Within six months, the band had won a 'Danny Award' for new talent at Glasgow's Celtic Connections festival and were signed to the leading Scottish independent folk imprint Greentrax Recordings, as well as kicking off their international career with a trip to the Festival Interceltique de Lorient in Brittany.

The band's first album 'Last Leaves' was recorded in 1999 and released at Celtic Connections 2000, with Davy Steele as producer. The album was recorded at Pier House Studios in Granton, Edinburgh.

In 2000, the band were invited to perform at Denmark's prestigious Tønder Festival and the UK's Cambridge Folk Festival.

In early 2001, Edinburgh-born Jon Bews, formerly of Bùrach, replaced Patterson on fiddle, and later that year Tyrone button box and whistle player Leo McCann was asked to join to expand the band's largely string-driven sound. McCann toured with the band for the first time on the Scottish Folk Festival tour of Germany in January 2002, where the band honed the material for their second album on Greentrax, 3 Ravens. Launched on their return visit to Cambridge Folk Festival in August 2002, the band's recording of the traditional song 'Billy Taylor' set to Polwart's tune attracted the attention of BBC Radio 2's Mike Harding and significant airplay boosted the band's profile considerably. Polwart's song 'Thaney', about the Scottish Saint Thenew (Teneu), (more commonly known mistakenly as Enoch), earned a nomination in the 2003 Radio 2 Folk Awards. 3 Ravens also showcased Byrne's own growing songwriting talents for the first time, with his Angus Scots lament 'The Lang Road Doon'. 3 Ravens was recorded at Castlesound Studios in Pencaitland, East Lothian.

=== 2004 personnel change ===
Following continued touring in Europe, especially in Germany, the Netherlands and Scandinavia, in September 2004 the band announced a major change of personnel. Polwart left to pursue a solo career and McCann's imminent fatherhood prompted him to return to his previous career in social work. Polwart and McCann worked their notice until February 2005, coincidentally the same month as Polwart won three Radio 2 Folk Awards, catapulting her re-released 2003 solo album 'Faultlines' to greater heights.

Byrne, Dunlop and Bews continued the band with new members Fiona Hunter from Glasgow (vocals, cello) and Liverpool-born Ewan MacPherson (guitar, mandolin, mandola, tenor banjo, jaw harp, vocals), and a series of crossover concerts in January and February 2005 took place, featuring both old and new line-ups, including a sellout show at Celtic Connections in Glasgow.

In June 2005 the band recorded their third album 'The Unseen Hours' at Watercolour Studios in Ardgour, Lochaber in the Scottish Highlands, and the album was released in November 2005, surprising many critics with its continuity from the band's previous work, and earning rave reviews with its strong commitment to traditional Scots ballads.

The Unseen Hours line-up toured Germany and the Netherlands in 2006 to great acclaim and in 2007 performed with Swedish ballad band Ranarim at the Celtic Connections festival as well as making their first sojourn to the US and Canada.

=== 2008 onwards ===
In December 2007 MacPherson left the band to pursue other projects to be replaced by guitar and bouzouki player David Wood from Grindleford in Derbyshire, formerly of CrossCurrent.

Fiddler Mike Vass joined the band in 2008, previously best known for performing in a duo with his sister Ali Vass, replacing Jon Bews.

The band's 2008 album 'Flower & Iron' was released simultaneously in the USA on Mad River Records and in the UK and elsewhere on Greentrax Recordings, leading the UK's Guardian newspaper to label the band 'one of the folk bands of 2009', whilst the Boston Globe suggested Malinky "may be the finest young Scottish band since Silly Wizard", in a nod to the legendary Scottish group which brought Phil Cunningham, his brother Johnny, and Andy M. Stewart to prominence.

In April 2010, founder member Mark Dunlop left to start a family, and the band reverted to a four-piece. Mike Vass subsequently left the band in October 2010 to pursue a fiddle teaching job in Argyllshire. The 2010 BBC Radio Scotland Young Musician of the Year, Daniel Thorpe, occupied the fiddle seat on a guest basis until spring 2011.

In December 2010, the band won the 'Scottish Folk Band of the Year' award at the MG ALBA Scots Trad Music Awards, led by concertina maestro Simon Thoumire's Hands up for Trad organisation.

=== 2011–2012: Hiatus ===
In June 2011, the band announced a hiatus after three years of intensive touring, mainly in Germany and North America.

=== 2013: Return to performing ===
In late 2012, the band – minus guitarist Dave Wood – announced that they would start to perform again from January 2013, with a concert at Glasgow's Celtic Connections festival. Mark Dunlop and Mike Vass rejoined the band, with a new album recording slated for summer 2013.

=== 2014: Return to recording ===
Vass' serious illness with neuroborreliosis in summer 2013 delayed the album recording. Following Vass' recovery, the band recorded their fifth album "Far Better Days" at Gorbals Sound in Glasgow in August 2014, produced by Capercaillie's Donald Shaw. The album was launched at Celtic Connections in January 2015, going on public release on 20 April 2015, on Malinky's own label, with support from Creative Scotland.

=== 2019: Anniversary ===
On 1 June 2019 Malinky released their 20th-anniversary double album Handsel produced by Greentrax Recordings.

== Discography ==
=== Malinky ===
- Last Leaves (2000, Greentrax Recordings)
- 3 Ravens (2002, Greentrax)
- The Unseen Hours (2005, Greentrax; Mad River Records (USA))
- Flower & Iron (2008, Greentrax; Mad River USA)
- Far Better Days (2015, Malinky Music)
- Handsel (2CD, 2019 Greentrax)
