= Joe Aitken =

Scottish bothy ballad singer (1944–2024)

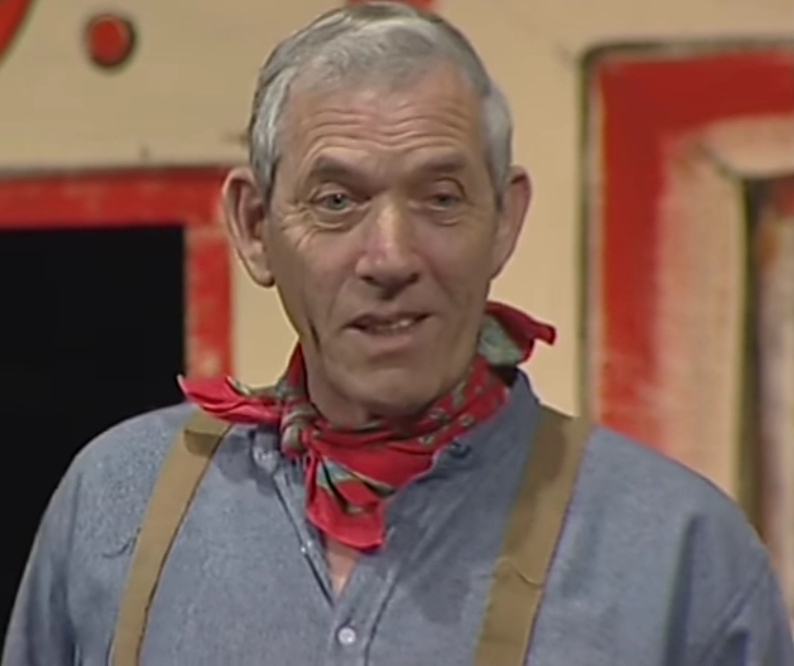
- Aitken in 2015
- Born: 10 April 1944; Perthshire, Scotland
- Died: 3 April 2024 (aged 79); Kirriemuir, Angus, Scotland
- Occupation: Bothy ballad singer
- Years active: 1982–2024

Joe Aitken (10 April 1944 – 3 April 2024) was a Scottish bothy ballad singer from Kirriemuir.

Aitken won several awards for bothy ballad singing such as the Champion of Champions award in Elgin, Moray and the Citty Finlayson Scots Singer of the Year at the Scots Trad Music Awards in 2010. He was made a member of the Scottish Traditional music hall of fame in 2018.

Aitken died of cancer on 3 April 2024, aged 79.
