= Jim Reid (folk musician) =

- Born: 5 May 1934; Dundee, Scotland
- Origin: Scotland
- Died: 6 July 2009 (aged 75)
- Genres: Scottish folk
- Instruments: Guitar, harmonica
- Years active: 1970s–2009
- Labels: Springthyme, Greylag
- Website: http://www.myspace.com/jimreidangus

Jim Reid (5 May 1934 – 6 July 2009) was a Scottish folk musician who was born in Dundee. Many of his songs are about his home town of Dundee and the people and places of the surrounding county of Angus.

== Biography ==
The first folk group Reid was in was The Taysiders in the 1970s, but he became better known as the driving force behind The Foundry Bar Band from Arbroath recording three albums with them in the 1980s. Later Reid partnered up with the Dundee accordionist John Huband, to record the album Freewheeling Now.

Reid's solo work has included his debut in 1984 I Saw The Wild Geese Flee, followed by The Better o a Sang in 1996, Emfae Dundee in 2001 and Yont the Tay in 2005. In 2005, Reid released a songbook with a collection of his own songs titled after his second album The Better o a Sang.

Reid guest featured on many other artists recordings including the ninth to twelfth volumes of the twelve volume series of Linn Records The Complete Songs of Robert Burns. He appeared on other works such as the Hamish Henderson tribute album, A The Bairns O Adam and Life in the Kingdom which was with the children of Fife primary schools.

In 2005 he won the "Scots Singer of the Year" award, and Reid regularly played at festivals until he was diagnosed with dementia.

Reid died on 6 July 2009 at the age of 75.

Reid's song "The Wild Geese" (also known as "Norland Wind") from his debut album, in which he put music to Violet Jacob's 1915 poem, has been performed and recorded by many other artists, including Battlefield Band, Malinky, Frightened Rabbit with Lau and Jim Malcolm.

== Discography ==
=== Solo albums ===
- I Saw The Wild Geese Flee (1984)
- The Better o' a Sang (1996)
- Emfae Dundee (2001)
- Yont The Tay (2005)

=== with The Foundry Bar Band ===
- The Foundry Bar Band (1981)
- On The Road with The Foundry Bar Band (1983)
- Rolling Home (1988)

=== with John Huband ===
- Freewheeling Now (1990)
