= Light My Byre =

Studio album by Peat and Diesel
- Released: 24 January 2020
- Recorded: 2019
- Studio: Wee Studio, Stornoway, Scotland
- Genre: Folk, Celtic
- Length: 41:00
- Language: English, Scottish Gaelic
- Label: Wee Studio Records

Peat and Diesel chronology
Uptown Fank (2019)	Light My Byre (2020)

Light My Byre is the second album by Scottish band Peat and Diesel, released on 24 January 2020. The album reached number 27 on the UK Albums Chart and got to number 2 on the Scottish Albums Chart, making it the band's most successful album to date.

== Track listing ==
1. "Horo Gheallaidh" – 3:24
2. "Brandy in the Airidh" – 4:08
3. "Dirty Old Town" – 4:13
4. "Co Leig A-mach Thu" – 4:11
5. "Pirates of the Hebrides" – 3:29
6. "Calum Dan's Transit Van" – 3:27
7. "Kishorn Commandos" – 3:51
8. "Watchakapheep" – 3:17
9. "Co-Dhiu Dot Com" – 3:04
10. "Spancil Hill" – 4:27
11. "Island" – 3:43

== Personnel ==
- Boydie MacLeod – vocals, guitar
- Innes Scott – accordion
- Uilly Macleod – drums

== Charts ==
Chart performance for Light My Byre
Chart (2020)	Peak position
Scottish Albums (OCC)	2
UK Albums (OCC)	27

== See also ==
- List of 2020 albums
