= Kinnaris Quintet =

Scottish folk band

- Origin: Glasgow, Scotland
- Genres: Scottish folk music
- Years active: 2017–present
- Members: Aileen Reid; Fiona MacAskill; Jenn Butterworth; Laura-Beth Salter; Laura Wilkie
- Website: kinnarisquintet.com

Kinnaris Q (formerly Kinnaris Quintet) is a Scottish folk band, founded in 2017, whose music is influenced by Scottish and Irish traditional music, bluegrass and classical. The group takes its name from the south-east Asian mythological creature, the Kinnaris, renowned for its dance, song and poetry. In 2019 they won the Belhaven Bursary for Innovation in Scottish Music.

== Membership ==
- Jenn Butterworth – guitar
- Aileen Reid (formerly Aileen Reid Gobbi) – 5-string fiddle
- Fiona MacAskill – fiddle
- Laura-Beth Salter – mandolin
- Laura Wilkie – fiddle (active 2017 - 2025)

== History ==
The members of the group knew each other from playing in the same sessions and meeting each other at gigs. In 2017, Reid invited Wilkie, MacAskill, Salter and Butterworth to her flat to jam and they agreed to form the group. In 2017, Salter and Butterworth released an album together, Bound, under their own names and, in 2018, Kinnaris Quintet released their debut album, Free One. Free One was longlisted for the 2019 Scottish Album of the Year Award. Their second album This Too was released in 2022.

== Discography ==
- Free One (2018)
- This Too (2022)
