= Gareth Davies-Jones =

Folk singer, songwriter and composer from Northern Ireland

- Genres: Folk
- Instrument: acoustic guitar
- Years active: 2004–present
- Website: www.garethdavies-jones.com

Gareth Davies-Jones is a folk singer, songwriter and composer from County Down, Northern Ireland. After finishing education in Newcastle, becoming based in Northumberland and turning professional in 2004, Davies-Jones has earned a living as a singer-songwriter. More known on the "Christian scene" than the acoustic folk one, he has extensively toured the United Kingdom and Ireland.

== Biography ==
Davies-Jones grew up on the shores of Belfast Lough, then moved to Newcastle University to complete his education. After busking and performing in bands, Davies-Jones turned professional in 2004.

In 2009 Davies-Jones provided and performed a re-arrangement of the carol In the Bleak Midwinter for the documentary "The Budgerigar and the Prisoner", an award-winning Internet programme award at the Sony 2009 Awards by Clifton Diocese.

In 2015 Davies-Jones undertook an arts-funded residency called "The Seam" at the North of England Institute of Mining and Mechanical Engineers. This enabled him to research books for mining stories, about which he was able to write songs. The manual "Practical Coal Mining," in particular, inspired him to write a song of the same name. Following the residency, Davies-Jones undertook a tour called "The Seam".

In an interview in 2017 with Tony Cummings, Davies-Jones said being professional had been a hard road but that he had made a living out of it.

To support the endangered curlew bird species for World Curlew Day on 21 April 2020, Davies-Jones composed and recorded the song More Than Memory.
