= Jenna Reid =

Scottish fiddle player

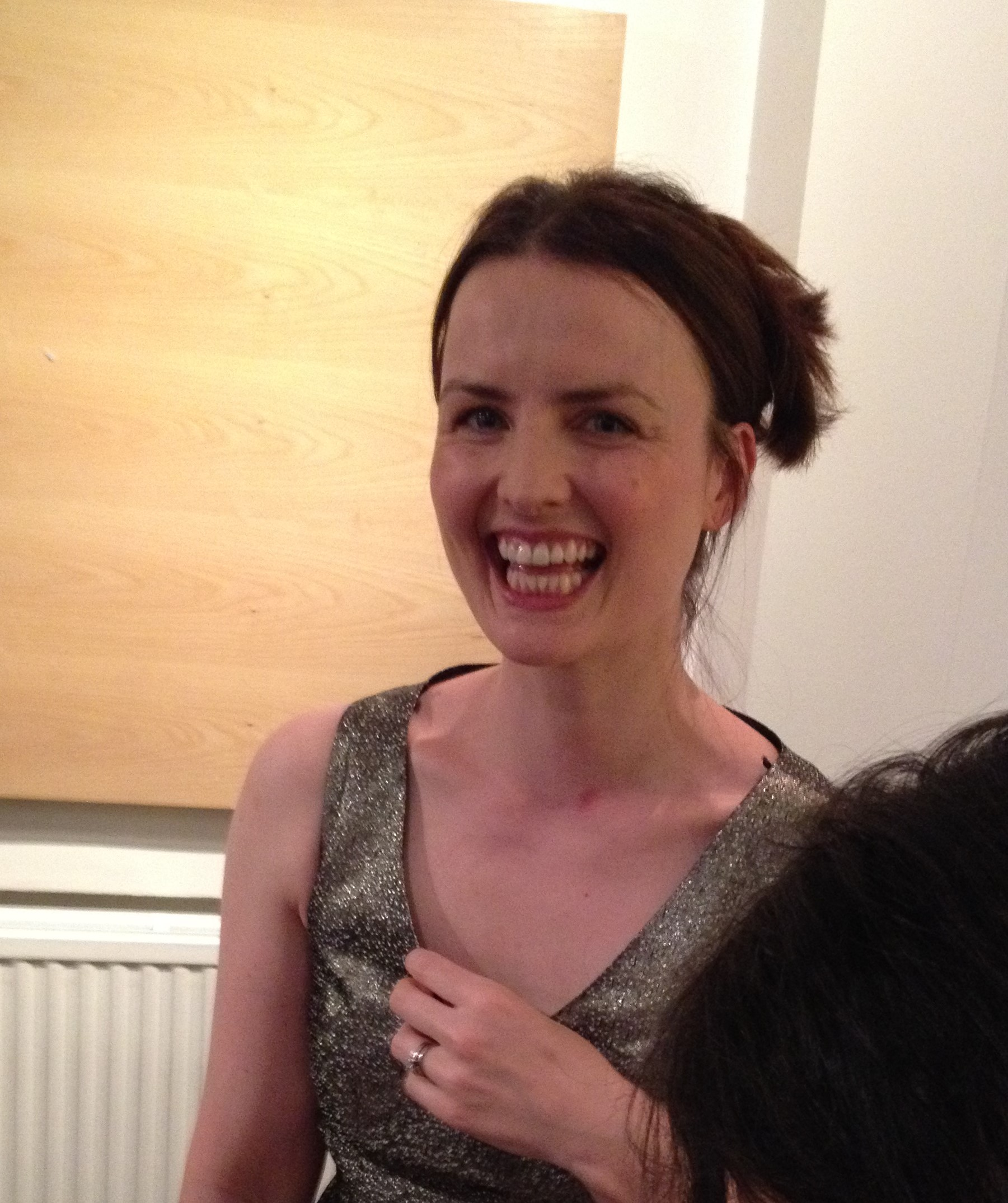
- Jenna Reid in 2016

Background information
- Born: Quarff, Shetland, Scotland
- Origin: Shetland, Scotland
- Genres: Traditional
- Instrument: Fiddle
- Website: Jenna Reid

Jenna Reid is a Scottish fiddle player. She has been described as "...the finest fiddler in Scotland of her generation."

== Early life ==
She was born and brought up in the village of Quarff, in the Shetland Islands of Scotland and found a fiddle in her grandmother's attic when she was nine years old and started to play it. She was taught by Tom Anderson and Willie Hunter and also studied the classical piano. She graduated from the Royal Scottish Academy of Music and Drama, Glasgow, with a Bachelor of Arts degree in Scottish traditional music where she also sang and played the piano accordion and the piano (which she learned from her teacher Walter Blair).

== Career ==
In addition to performing with her own Jenna Reid Band, she played with the Scottish traditional music group Filska (which originally consisted of Jenna, her sister Bethany and her mother Joyce Reid but later included her friend Gemma Wilson) which performed in France, Canada, the US, Sweden, Denmark, Norway, Italy and Ireland. She and Filska represented Scotland by playing at the Walt Disney World Millennium Celebrations at the Epcot Centre, Florida and they also played at Scotland's Millennium celebrationss.

She also played with Blazin' Fiddles RANT, the Highland Fiddle Band, the Gaelic band Dòchas, Deaf Shepherd, Fiddler's Bid, Vital Signs, Celtic Feet and McFalls Chamber. At the request of Aly Bain and Jerry Douglas, she has featured as a guest artist on Transatlantic Sessions 3 & 4. She played on the soundtrack of the film Seachd: The Inaccessible Pinnacle.

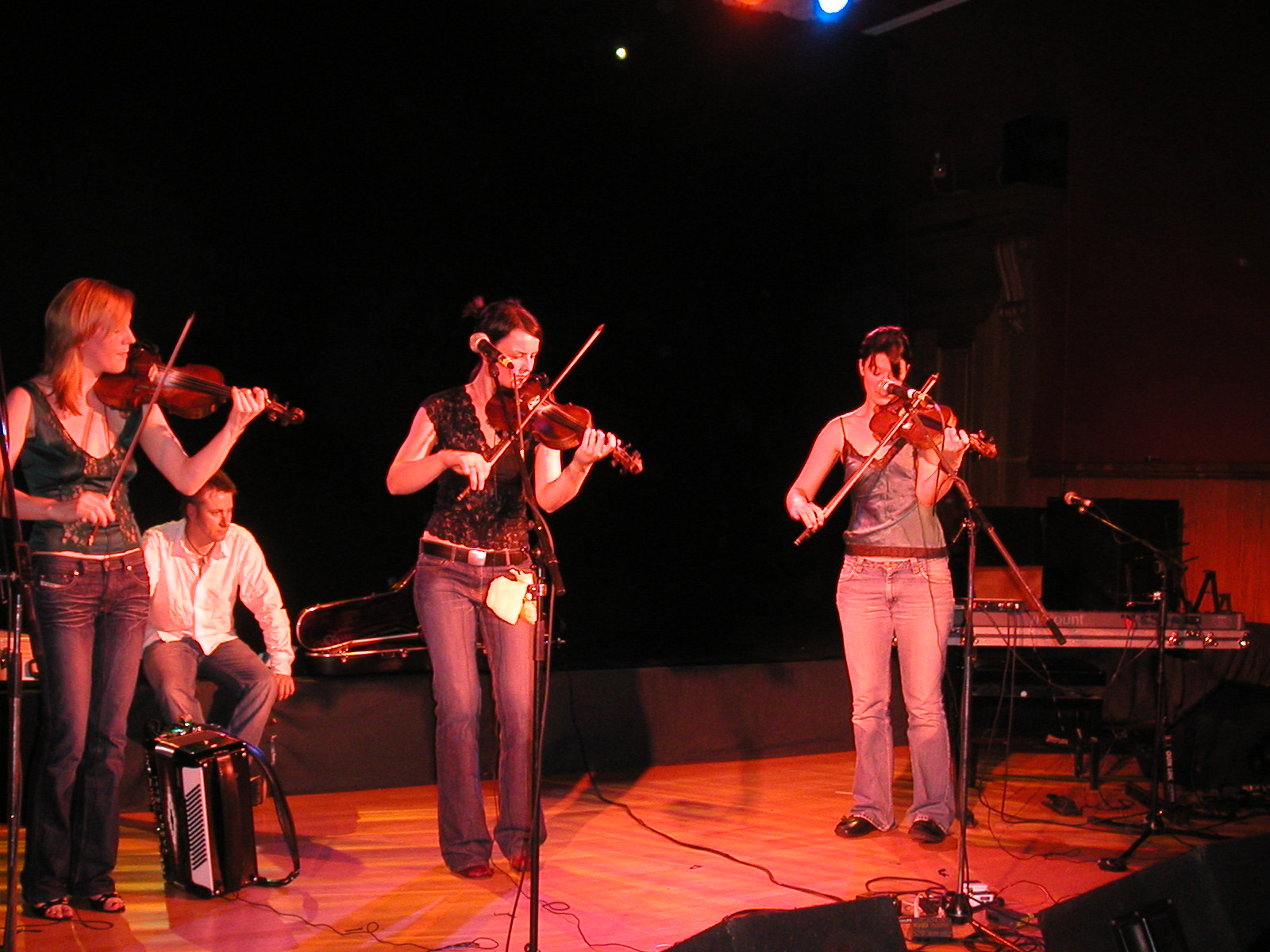
Jenna Reid (centre) with Filska band, Edinburgh Festival 2004

She was awarded the "Shetland Young Fiddler of the Year" prize in 1995 when she was 14 years old and was in the final of the "Young Scottish Traditional Musician of the Year" competition in 2004. In 2005 Jenna won "Best Up and Coming Artist" at the Scots Trad Music Awards. In 2007, she was nominated for "Best Instrumentalist" and was awarded the "Dewar Arts Award."

Jenna and her sister Bethany were curators for the Shetland Fiddle Frenzy festival in 2013, 2014 and 2015.

In 2018, Jenna started working as a freelance broadcaster for the BBC One.

In 2019, she won the PRS Traditional Composer of the Year Award at the MG ALBA Scots Trad Music Awards and also her band Blazin Fiddles won the Folk Band of the Year award.

Jenna is married to drummer Iain Sandilands who works at Big Noise (which supports children through music) in Stirling. They have two children a boy and a girl.

== Discography ==
- With Silver And All (2005)
- No. 1 Scottish Traditional Music from the RSAMD (2007)
- The Laughing Girl (2008)
- Escape - The Story of Jan Baalrud and the Shetland Bus (2010 - with Bethany Reid)
- Morning Moon (2012)
- Escape (2012)
- The Quarff Collections (2014)
- Live in Shetland (2015)
- Working Hands (2019)
- Songs from Jenna Reid (2020)
