= Lauren MacColl =

Scottish fiddle player

Lauren MacColl is a Scottish fiddle player from Fortrose. She has released three solo albums as well as a duet album with flute player Calum Stewart. MacColl is a member of the fiddle quartet RANT and contemporary folk band Salt House.

== Discography ==
=== Solo albums ===
- When Leaves Fall (2007)
- Strewn With Ribbons (2009)
- The Seer (2017)
- Landskein (2020)
- Haar (2023)

=== With Heal & Harrow ===
- Heal & Harrow (2022)

=== With Calum Stewart ===
- Wooden Flute & Fiddle (2012)

=== With RANT ===
- RANT (2014)
- Reverie (2016)
- The Portage (2019)

=== With Salt House ===
- Lay Your Dark Low (2013)
- Undersong (2018)
- Huam (2020)
- Working for Zeus (EP) (2021)

== Awards ==
- BBC Radio 2 Young Folk Award 2004
- MG Alba Scots Trad Music Awards 2009 - "Instrumentalist of the Year"
