= Edinburgh Folk Club =

- EFC
- Interactive map of Edinburgh Folk Club
- Location: Pleasance Cabaret Bar, Edinburgh, Scotland
- Seating type: Cabaret Bar, Seated/Standing
- Capacity: 150
- Type: Folk Music Club
- Events: Folk, traditional

Construction
- Opened: September 1973

Website
- Edinburgh Folk Club

Edinburgh Folk Club is the principal folk club within the Scottish capital city, Edinburgh. The club's roots date back to the early seventies where it grew from the British folk revival into one of the most respected and long running clubs in Scotland.

== History ==
It has been suggested that Edinburgh Folk Club is the successor to the supposedly infamous 'Buffs Folk Club' which was active during the 1960s, but was ultimately closed down by the police. Edinburgh Folk Club's first meeting took place in the basement of George Square's Chaplaincy Centre in September 1973, and having changed venues on numerous occasions over the years, it now meets in the Ukrainian Community Centre, 14 Royal Terrace, Edinburgh EH7 5AB.

== Awards ==
The club was winner of the BBC Radio 2 Folk Awards Folk Club of the Year 2003 and has been nominated for various other awards, including the Scots Trad Music Awards 2010 and the Scottish New Music Awards 2011. In 2017, Edinburgh Folk Club was awarded 'Club of the Year' at the annual Scots Trad Music Awards.
