= Simon Thoumire =

Scottish musician

Simon Thoumire is a Scottish musician and an English concertina virtuoso.

Thoumire has played all over the world. A winner of the BBC Radio 2 Young Tradition Award in 1989, Thoumire has always been keen to explore different genres of music, releasing many records over the years delving into folk, jazz, improvisation and composition (see discography). He has also pursued interests in the industry side of traditional music forming Foot Stompin' Records in 1997, Scottish Traditional Music Trust (2000) and Hands Up for Trad (2003).
