= Skerryvore (band) =

Scottish Celtic rock band

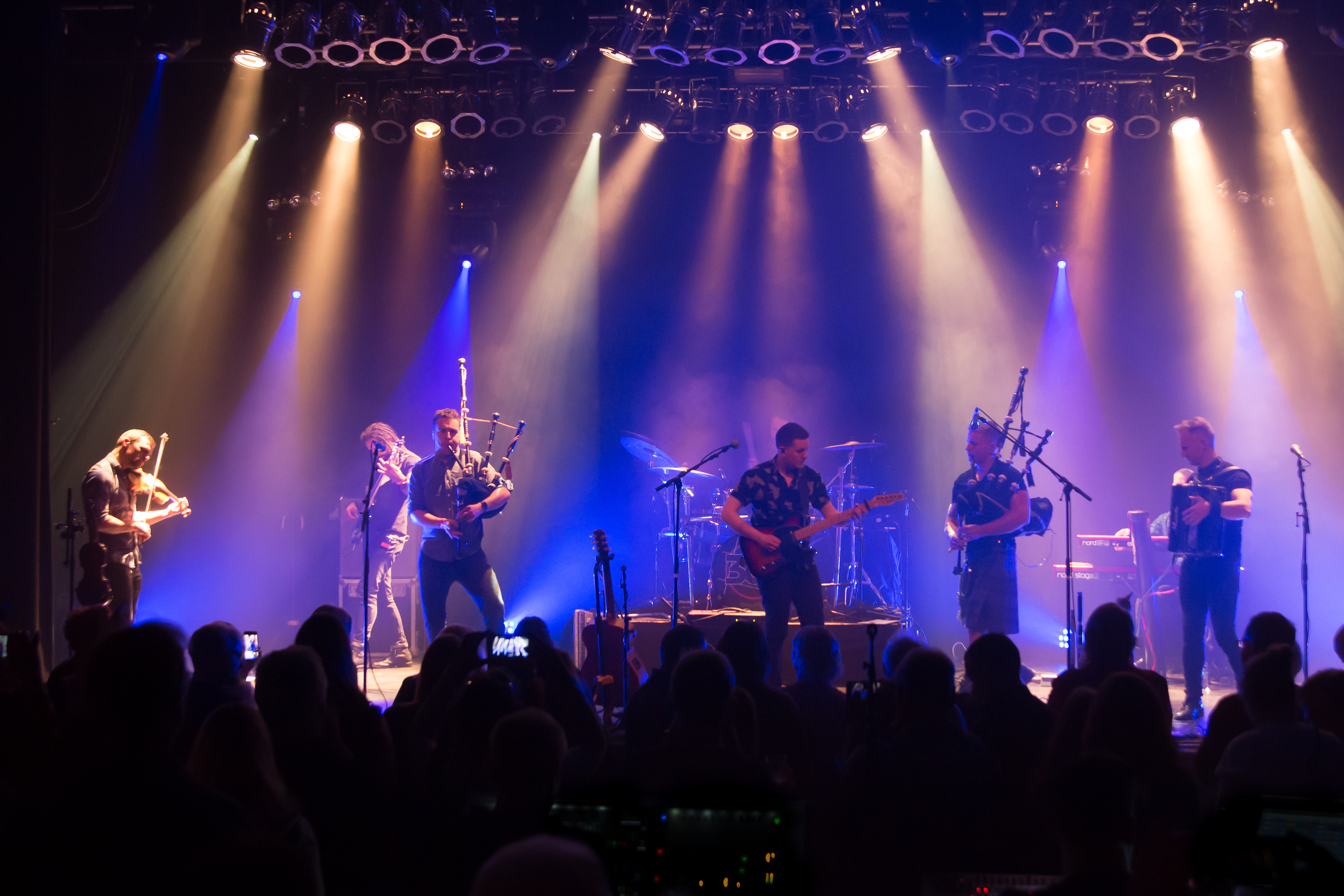

Background information
- Origin: Tiree, Argyll and Bute, Scotland
- Genre: Celtic rock
- Years active: 2000–present
- Members: Daniel Gillespie; Martin Gillespie; Fraser West; Alec Dalglish; Craig Espie; Alan Scobie; Jodie Bremaneson; Scott Wood
- Past members: Barry Caulfield; Colin Cunningham; Paul Hoolahan
- Website: www.skerryvore.com

Skerryvore are a Scottish Celtic rock band originally formed by Daniel Gillespie and Fraser West in Tiree, Argyll and Bute in 2000, after the two began playing ceilidh music together at various functions. Named after the Skerryvore lighthouse which lies 12 miles (19 km) off the coast of Tiree, the band have released six studio albums, a compilation album, and a live album. Currently based in Glasgow, Scotland, Skerryvore have toured Europe, the United States, the Middle East, and China. Their earlier work was inspired by the music of their native Scotland. Later influences include rock, pop, jazz, Cajun, and country.

== History ==
=== Beginnings (2000–2003) ===
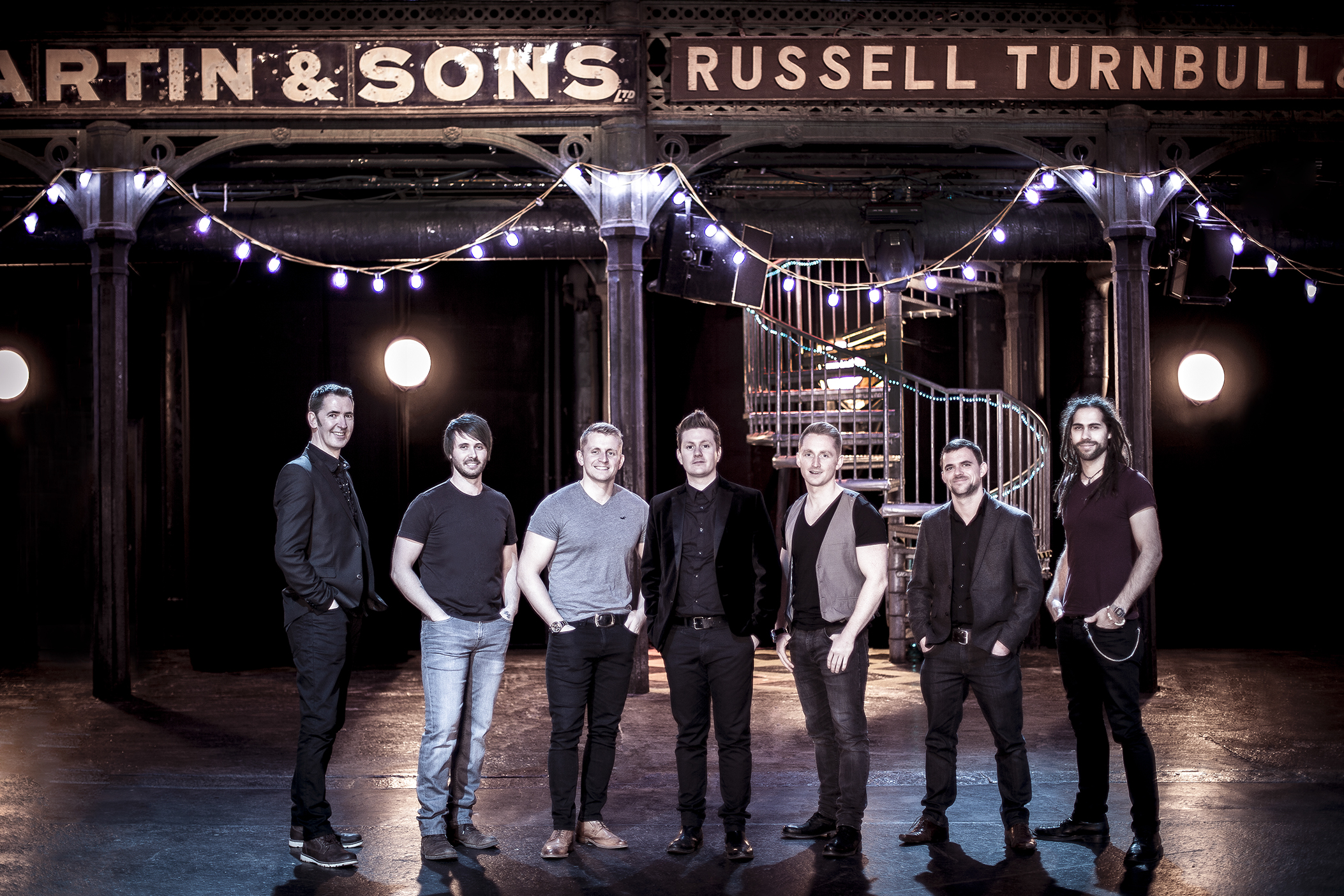
A photograph of the band Skerryvore shot before their Celtic Connections gig at Glasgow's Old Fruitmarket Venue 2016 by Rachel Keenan

The founding members of the band have performed in bands prior to formation. Both Daniel and Martin Gillespie were students of the Scottish folk music tutors Gordon Connell and Robert Beck. Between the two, Daniel and Martin learned various Scottish instruments including bagpipes and accordion. They regularly performed at traditional Scottish dances and venues.

Fraser West and Alec Dalglish would later join the band with Daniel and Martin. Fraser and Alec were students of the Music Department of Deans Community High School in Livingston, West Lothian. The school benefited from the policy for music education and performance of West Lothian Council. Fraser primarily played trumpet and Alec played the euphonium.

Fraser met Daniel on holiday on Tiree. In 2000, after Daniel moved to the mainland to study, the two played ceilidh music together at functions. In the summer of 2003, with Martin and Alec, they toured small venues in the Scottish Highlands and Islands. Up to this point, they were known variously as "The Gillespie Brothers", "The Gillespie Brothers and Fraser", and "Brois", a Tiree Gaelic word which translated to "a complete cock up".

=== New band name, West Coast Life and On The Road (2004–2009) ===
In 2004, the band adopted the name "Skerryvore" and started work on their first album, "West Coast Life". It was recorded at Watercolour Music, Ardgour, produced by Allan Henderson, and was released in the summer of 2005. The album was the "Album of the Month" on Mary Ann Kennedy"s BBC Radio Scotland programme "Celtic Connections", and consisted predominantly of arrangements of traditional tunes, including a vocal rendition of "Home to Donegal", and a vocal arrangement of John Lennon and Paul McCartney's "Blackbird".

Following the release of "West Coast Life", Skerryvore's volume of gigging increased, both in number and in scale. The band experimented with guest musicians and, in 2006, started work on their second album. Fiddler Craig Espie and bassist Barry Caulfield were added to the line-up. This increased the range and scope of the musical styles they could bring to their sound.

When the second album, "On the Road" was released in 2007, a brass section (The Horn Supremacy) was included. Tracks on "On the Road" are also predominantly rearrangements of traditional tunes but with a rockier, funkier feel to them. Following a gig in their adopted home town of Glasgow, reviewer Stuart Morrison, in "The Herald" stated that "we could well have found a Runrig for the 21st century."

The band continued to build their following by touring throughout Scotland and by adding a growing number of foreign gigs. They featured increasingly at larger events such as T in the Park and similar festivals. They became "ambassadors for Scotland" when they accompanied a Scottish Government delegation to the 2008 Ryder Cup in Louisville, Kentucky, USA. Their company, Skerryvore, won the PSYBT Young Entrepreneurs of the Year in 2009.

=== Present day (2010–present) ===
Skerryvore's third album, "Skerryvore", released in 2010, is almost entirely made up of the band's own compositions plus a few rearrangements of traditional songs. They retained their instrumentation of accordion, pipes, whistle, fiddle, guitar, bass and drums, dispensed with the brass section and added keyboards to both their album arrangements and to many of their live performances. The album received a considerable amount of critical acclaim, including from "The Daily Record's" John Dingwall who described Skerryvore as "the hottest new Celtic rockers on the block."

In 2011, "Skerryvore" brought the band awards including Scottish New Music Awards Album of the Year and, for Alec Dalglish, "Frankie Miller Songwriter of the Year". In December 2011, Skerryvore also won the award as "Best Live Act" in the 2011 MG ALBA Scots Trad Music Awards. The band continued their work with the charity "Live Music Now", working with youngsters and other groups in settings including HMP Cornton Vale.

Their fourth album, "World of Chances", released in 2012 is a departure from the style of their previous ones. Although retaining their traditional instrumentation, the album is almost entirely made up of songs penned by Alec Dalglish, with one tune composed by Martin Gillespie. Alongside their traditional roots, many more "world" influences are apparent in this album, from country to cajun to jazz and rock. The album entered the top 10 in iTunes singer/songwriter chart in June 2012. A limited edition deluxe version of "World of Chances", incorporating live and acoustic versions of some tracks, alongside a live version of Runrig"s "Rocket to the Moon" was released in late 2012. Skerryvore feature on BBC Scotland and BBC Alba's output, playing tracks from albums on radio programmes, excerpts from concert and festival performances, interviews and also featuring the band in the first "A Gharaids" programme from BBC Alba in February 2011. Late in 2012, Barry Caulfield left the band and was replaced by Colin Cunningham, formerly with Wolfstone, on bass. Prior to recording their fifth album, Colin left and was replaced by Jodie Bremaneson. Producer of their albums since 2010, and keyboard player, Alan Scobie joined the band on stage in all gigs and, following a diagnosis of focal dystonia for Martin, Scott Wood was added on pipes and whistles. When on tour, the band are seldom without 9th member, Paul Hoolahan.

"Chasing the Sun", released in September 2014, was described as the band's most mature sounding album, reflecting the various styles that have influenced their development, as well as re-emphasising their traditional roots. "Chasing the Sun" was also the band's first international collaboration with platinum award-winning producer Chris Kress of the Dave Matthews Band. Chris worked with the band on two of the tracks: "Blown Away" and "By Your Side".

Skerryvore celebrated their 10th birthday in 2015. In May 2015, they held a "Decade" event in Oban. The open air concert, held at Mossfield Stadium, attracted an audience of 6000 along with various artists including The Red Hot Chilli Pipers, Trail West, Dougie MacLean, Sharon Shannon, Skipinnish, and Scott Wood Band.

After returning from the concert, Skerryvore's "Decade" album was released. Described as a celebration of their 10 years, the CD is a collection of many live versions of Skerryvore classics, some recorded at Festivals, including Tonder Festival in Denmark, with others recorded as "live" studio sessions. It also included previously unreleased tracks, including the single "Happy to be Home", featuring Sharon Shannon. After this release, in collaboration with the Bruichladdich distillery, the band released a limited edition, single malt whisky named after the "Decade" album. With only 290 bottles produced, this has become a collector's item.

Following the success of "Decade", Skerryvore launched "Oban Live": a two-day festival which was held at Mossfield Park in Oban in May 2016, June 2017, June 2018, and June 2019.

Skerryvore won the "Best Live Act" for 2016 at the MG ALBA Scots Trad Music Awards.

During the COVID-19 pandemic, Skerryvore released a single, "Everyday Heroes". Composed by Martin Gillespie, the single featured a variety of guest musicians from the Scottish music scene, as well as former UK Government press secretary Alastair Campbell. The reached number 1 on the Scottish Singles chart. "Everyday Heroes" won the Original Work of the Year award at the 2020 MG ALBA Scottish Trad Music Awards.

Skerryvore won the "Best Live Act" for 2022 at the MG ALBA Scots Trad Music Awards.

== Band members ==
=== Current members ===
- Daniel Gillespie (2000–present)
- Fraser West (2000–present)
- Martin Gillespie (2003–present)
- Alec Dalglish (2003–present)
- Craig Espie (2006–present)
- Jodie Bremaneson (2014–present)
- Alan Scobie
- Scott Wood

=== Past members ===
- Barry Caulfield (2006–2012)
- Colin Cunningham (2012–2014)
- Paul Hoolahan

== Discography ==
=== Albums ===
Title	Details	Peak chart positions	
Title	Details	SCO	UK
West Coast Life	Released: 1 July 2005; Label: Skipinnish; Formats: CD and digital download	—	—
On the Road	Released: 1 July 2007; Label: Skipinnish; Formats: CD and digital download	—	—
Skerryvore	Released: 5 July 2010; Label: Tyree; Formats: CD and digital download	—	—
World of Chances	Released: 2 December 2012; Label: Tyree; Formats: CD and digital download	—	—
Chasing the Sun	Released: 1 September 2014; Label: Tyree; Formats: CD and digital download	38	—
Decade	Released: 1 June 2015; Label: Tyree; Formats: CD and digital download	97	—
Evo	Released: 11 June 2018; Label: Tyree; Formats: CD and digital download	13	—
Live Across Scotland	Released: 10 July 2020; Label: Tyree; Formats: CD and digital download	17	—
Tempus	Released: 28 April 2023; Label: Tyree; Formats: CD and digital download	1	36
Beautiful Mistakes	Released: 6 November 2026; Label: Tyree; Formats: CD and digital download	1	31
"—" denotes a recording that did not chart or were not released.

=== Singles ===
Title	Year	Peak chart positions	Album
Title	Year	SCO	Album
"Caledonia"	2009	—	World of Chances
"Path to Home"	2010	—	Skerryvore
"On The Road" (Charity Single)	2011	99	Non-album singles
"Happy to Be Home" (featuring Sharon Shannon)	2015	52	Non-album singles
"Live Forever"	2017	49	EVO
"Soraidh Slàn & the Rise" (featuring Oban High School Pipe Band)	2019	13	Non-album singles
"Everyday Heroes" (NHS charity single)	2020	1	Non-album singles
"—" denotes a recording that did not chart or were not released.
