= Celtic Connections =

Annual music festival in Glasgow, Scotland

- Status: Active
- Genre: Festival of Scottish folk music
- Dates: 18 days in January / February
- Frequency: Annually
- Venue: Glasgow Royal Concert Hall
- Locations: Glasgow, Scotland
- Coordinates: 55.864503°N 4.252921°W
- Country: United Kingdom
- Inaugurated: 1994; 32 years ago
- Founder: Colin Hynd
- Most recent: 2025
- Attendance: 130,000
- Capacity: 25,000
- Artistic Director: Donald Shaw
- Organiser: Glasgow Life
- Website: www.celticconnections.com

The Celtic Connections festival started in 1994 in Glasgow, Scotland, and has since been held every January. Featuring over 300 concerts, ceilidhs, talks, free events, late night sessions and workshops, the festival focuses on the roots of traditional Scottish music and also features international folk, roots and world music artists. The festival is produced and promoted by Glasgow Life. Donald Shaw, a founding member of Capercaillie, was appointed Celtic Connections Artistic Director in 2006.

At the core of the festival is the Education Programme, which sees thousands of school children attend free morning concerts experiencing live music ranging from Burns to spiritual and blues. Celtic Connections also continues to foster new and young talent through its Young Tradition and New Voices series of concerts, and through the Danny Kyle Open Stage competition.

Every weekend of the festival, once the concerts are over, the late-night Celtic Connections Festival Club runs through to the small hours of the morning. No programme is announced in advance, and the club is renowned for one-off collaborations between musicians appearing at the festival.

== History ==
The Celtic Connections festival was founded by Colin Hynd in 1994 to fill a scheduling gap in the Glasgow Royal Concert Hall's (GRCH) normally quiet post-Christmas period. Hynd's strategy was to create a wide-ranging festival spanning from traditional music to more youth-oriented music, and to promote it through BBC Radio Scotland. He succeeded in attracting audiences of 33,000. In that first year all the events took place within the GRCH building, and did not include workshops.

The second festival in 1995 was again centered in the GRCH, and also took in the ballroom of the Hospitality Inn (later the Glasgow Thistle) nearby. 130 events were scheduled, involving more than 100 acts, over seventeen days, with over 50,000 admissions. Folk Roots noted the appearance of Alan Stivell and reunion gigs for both Moving Hearts and Relativity, as well as emerging talents Cara Dillon and Shooglenifty, and there was praise for the organisation and staff of the Concert Hall.

In 1996 the third festival opened out to venues beyond the Concert Hall, including Adelaide's (part of the Baptist Church on Bath Street) and the Barony Hall, plus a self-contained Cajun festival at the Tramway, and a late-night club. In an event which would become a hallmark of the festival, folk and classical music met with a performance by Aly Bain with the Scottish Ensemble. Jerry Douglas, Russ Barenberg, Aly Bain and Phil Cunningham appeared together though not apparently under the name Transatlantic Sessions. Home acts included Capercaillie and the Battlefield Band, and some of the visiting acts were Cherish the Ladies, Martin Hayes & Dennis Cahill, Natalie McMaster, Janis Ian, Carlos Nuñez and The Fureys. The Breton show "Heritage of the Celts" created by Dan ar Braz and Donal Lunny was considered a "mixed bag in musical terms", and diminished by the withdrawal of the Shotts and Dykehead Pipe Band over "a financial dispute with the French organisers". My Ain Countrie was a special event organised by Sheena Wellington with Scottish women singers and musicians including Ishbel MacAskill, Karen Matheson, Christine Kydd, Corrina Hewat and the Wrigley Sisters. However the future of the festival was said to be under threat due to local government reorganisation.

Attendances reached 61,000 for the fourth festival in 1997. The late-night club was said to have become too popular, with "aggro on the door". The Old Fruitmarket was noted as the venue for Shooglenifty, Kevin Burke and the "overrated" Afro-Celt Sound System. Other performers included Paul Brady, Billy Bragg, Eddi Reader, Emmylou Harris, Iris DeMent, Steve Earle, Davy Spillane, La Bottine Souriante, Altan, Gwerz, Simon Thoumire and the "fast-improving" Deaf Shepherd. A new strand, The House of Song brought a focus on traditional singing.

In its 13th year (2006), 300 artists performed to over 100,000 people in the eight venues. However the ambitious opening event, involving Catalan theatrical group La Fura dels Baus and Carlos Nuñez, had to be cancelled due to "technical difficulties". A performance by Barbara Dickson and Isla St Clair was also cancelled, and Deacon Blue were included in the brochure but not booked. After the event The Herald reported a statement by Louise Mitchell, director of GRCH, that there would be a "shake-up" for the festival.

In 2008, Celtic Connections celebrated its 15th birthday, with festival attendances reaching 120,000 and events taking place across 14 venues throughout Glasgow over 19 days.

Celtic Connections brings in visitors from throughout the world and is an integral and vibrant part of cultural life in Glasgow, with the economic impact on the city reaching £5.8 million in 2007. The festival actively promotes artistic links and cultural exchange across countries, reinforced by Showcase Scotland which brought 200 music industry delegates from 35 different countries to Scotland looking to book Scottish bands for festivals abroad in 2008.

The 2008 festival opened with the Common Ground concert where many of the artists taking part in the event performed together. Donald Shaw, artistic director of the festival, spoke about the future of Celtic Connections as well as the 1,000+ acts and 300+ events taking place in 2008 exclusively online.

By 2020 now run by GlasgowLife, the festival included over 300 events spread over 29 venues, and reported attendance of 130,000, with a maximum daily capacity of 25,000.

Shaw announced in February 2018 that he would be stepping aside as festival director, to be succeeded by Jade Hewat and a number of guest directors. He would remain as a "creative producer" responsible for special projects and one-off shows. By October 2020 Shaw, under his new title, remained the spokesperson for the festival. Hewat has since stepped aside replaced by Lesley Shaw (no relation) as Festival Manager and Shaw remains Artistic Director.

== Venues ==
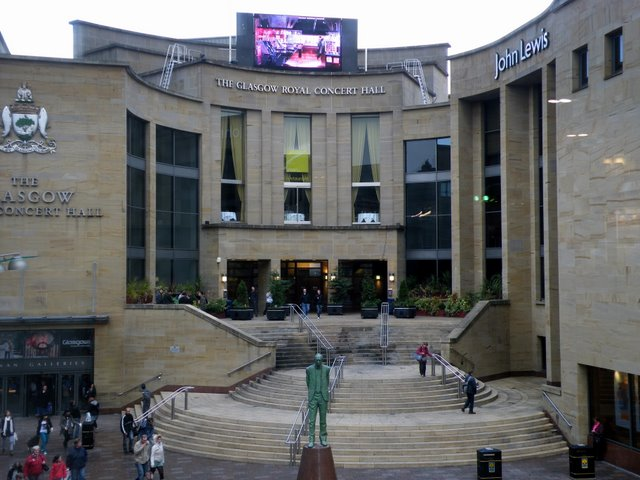
The Glasgow Royal Concert Hall

The focal point of the festival is the Glasgow Royal Concert Hall, where performances take place in every space, from workshops in the foyers, to performances by world-class artists in the Main Auditorium. The Old Fruitmarket, City Halls, Barrowland Ballroom, Tron Theatre, Mitchell Theatre, National Piping Centre, Tramway, the Mackintosh Church, St Luke's and Òran Mór also regularly host Celtic Connections concerts.

In the past, Celtic Connections events have taken place in the O2 ABC, the Classic Grand, King Tut's Wah Wah Hut, the King's Theatre, the Tall Ship, The Arches and Glasgow Cathedral.

== Regular features ==
=== Transatlantic Sessions ===
Transatlantic Sessions was originally made for TV, the first series being broadcast in 1995. The concept was a set of traditional musicians from the US, UK and Ireland being put together in a country retreat to make music, directed by Aly Bain and Jerry Douglas. The Transatlantic Sessions concert at Celtic Connections also includes traditional musicians from the same countries and occasionally others, and has a house band, usually the same musicians each year, plus about five guest musicians. The feature first appeared at the festival in 2004, and has occurred annually since. It is usually staged twice in the Glasgow Royal Concert Hall, and is "always one of the fastest sell-outs".

Regulars in the house band include Aly Bain, Phil Cunningham, the trio Michael McGoldrick, John McCusker and John Doyle, Jerry Douglas, Russ Barenberg, Donald Shaw (also the festival director), Danny Thompson and James Mackintosh. Since 2019 Thompson has been replaced by Daniel Kimbro.

In 2020 the guest artists were American mandolinist Sierra Hull, American roots musician Cahalen Morrison, Australian guitarist Tommy Emmanuel, Irish singer Cathy Jordan and Scottish singer-songwriter Rachel Sermanni.

=== Roaming Roots Revue ===
A one-off show to celebrate the 70th birthday of Bob Dylan was staged as part of Celtic Connections 2011, led by Roddy Hart & The Lonesome Fire featuring Rosanne Cash. The following year Rab Noakes organised a tribute to his friend the late Gerry Rafferty, which also featured Roddy Hart and the Lonesome Fire. From 2013, the Roaming Roots Revue became an annual feature of the festival. Curated by Roddy Hart & The Lonesome Fire, it features a cast of guest artists collaborating to create a one-off performance around a chosen theme. For example, in 2019, the theme was the 50th anniversary of The Beatles' album Abbey Road, and featured KT Tunstall. The Staves, and Phil Campbell (of The Temperance Movement) as well as Roddy Hart and a full orchestra. Other themes have been the music of Laurel Canyon and a celebration of Bruce Springsteen.

== Emerging talent ==
The festival seeks to promote emerging talent through a number of recurring strands.

=== New Voices ===
New Voices
- Description: Musical commission for emerging composers
- Location: Glasgow
- Country: Scotland
- Presented by: Celtic Connections festival
- Website: www.celticconnections.com

New Voices is an award for emerging composers made by the Celtic Connections festival annually since 1998. It is a musical commission which enables recipients to compose and perform a significant new suite of music of about forty-five minutes, based on traditional themes. Usually there are three commissions each year, with each composer performing their work at a lunchtime concert on one of the three Sundays of the festival. The funding provides for the musician both to develop the work, and to direct its performance, typically by five to ten musicians, at its première. In the earlier years, the composer was invited to further develop the work and revisit it at the festival the next year, but this is no longer practised.

The selection process for the commissions is informal. Sometimes a musician may approach the festival with an idea for a new work, other times festival director Donald Shaw proposes participation to a musician he thinks would benefit and create something worthwhile.

Various sponsors have supported New Voices over the years. In 2020 the awards were sponsored by the Scottish edition of The Times and Sunday Times, and the composers were Marit Fält, Pàdruig Morrison and Catriona Price.

=== Danny Kyle Open Stage ===
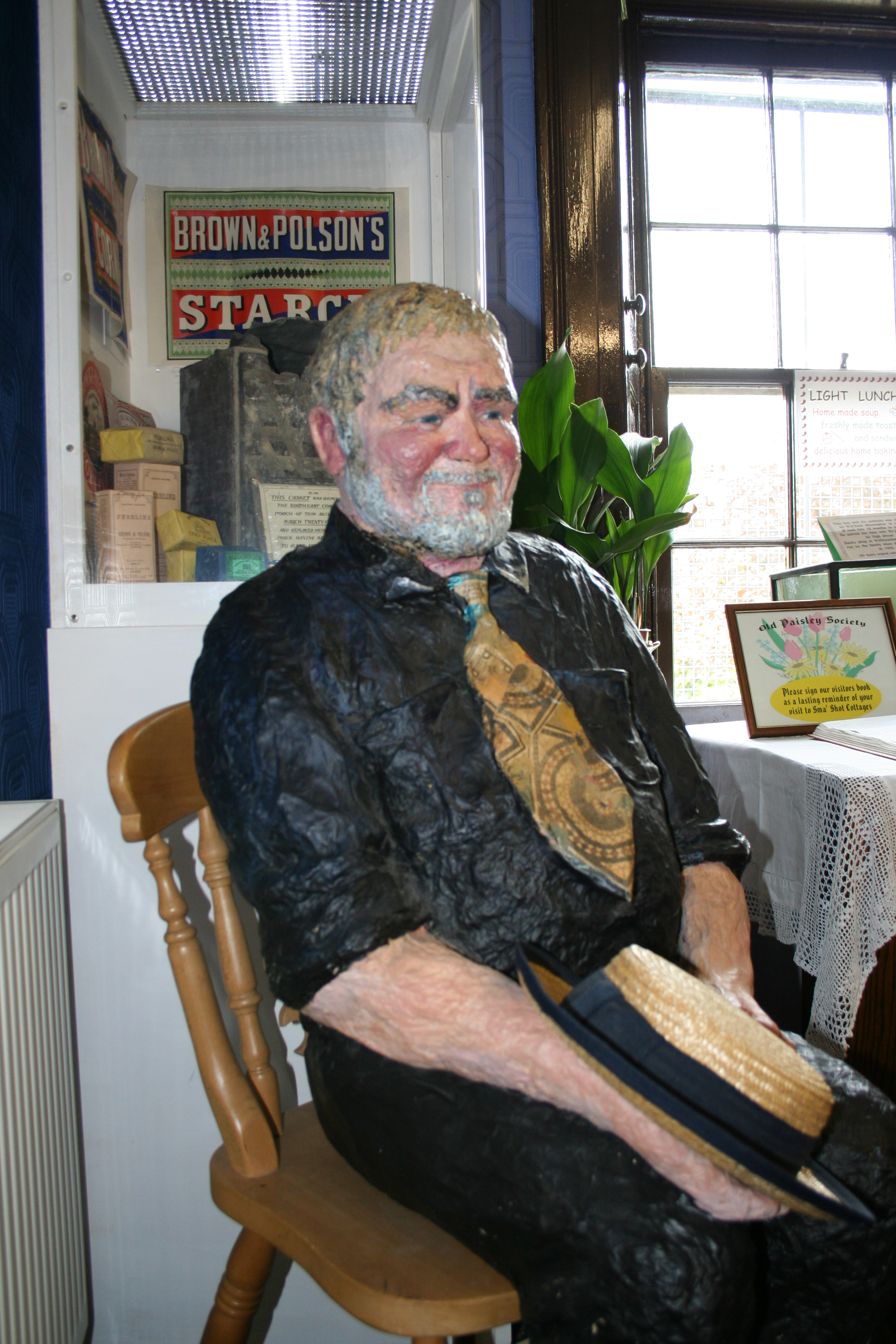
This figure of Danny Kyle is usually installed next to the Open Stage during the Celtic Connections festival.

The Open Stage is a showcase and competition for emerging talent, which takes place almost daily through the festival in the late afternoon, with free entry to the public. Five competitors, solo or bands, play a short set, and the six best acts from the series are invited to a final competition on the last day of the festival. The six finalists of the "Dannys" are offered support slots at the next year's festival. All the concerts are broadcast live on Celtic Music Radio.

Danny Kyle first ran a competition at the festival in 1998, the year of his death. It has since continued under its current name and the careful custodianship of Liz Clark. Previous winners include Malinky (including Karine Polwart), Breabach and Talisk.

=== Celtic Connections on Campus ===
Since 2015, a series of free lunchtime concerts under the title Celtic Connections on Campus has taken place in the Students Association building of Glasgow Caledonian University. These concerts are part of the festival, but are entirely organised by the staff and students of GCU's Audio Technology and Audio Systems Engineering degree. Performers must be current students at college, university or school, or recent graduates. The concerts are broadcast live on Celtic Music Radio.

=== BBC Radio Scotland Young Traditional Musician ===
The final concert of the BBC Radio Scotland Young Traditional Musician competition usually takes place in City Halls on the final day of the festival, televised on BBC Alba.

== Education programme ==
The education programme has run since 1999, and by 2020 had involved over 200,000 children from all over Scotland. Each year about 15,000 children attend free concerts in the Glasgow Royal Concert Hall by artists performing at the festival; often this is a child's first experience of live music. Workshops are run within schools for another 2,000 children, offering tastes of traditional arts, including song, storytelling, dance and instrumental music.

== Showcase Scotland ==
Showcase Scotland is the largest music industry event in Scotland. It generally runs during the final weekend of Celtic Connections, and promotes Scottish and visiting artists to an audience of promoters, artistic directors and record industry people. It is supported by Creative Scotland.

== Broadcast coverage ==
Celtic Music Radio is based in the Glasgow Royal Concert Hall during the festival, broadcasting around seven hours of live material from the venue every day. This includes interviews with performers, reviews and previews of gigs, and live coverage of concerts, including every act on the Danny Kyle Open Stage.

BBC Radio Scotland provides extensive coverage, and many features have also been broadcast on Radio Borders. Highlights are broadcast on national station BBC Radio 2 and in BBC ALBA's occasional series Seirm and Cuirm @ Celtic.

== Awards and recognition ==
In February 2004, Celtic Connections was presented by Robin Cook MP with the "Good Tradition Award" at the BBC Radio 2 Folk Awards, in recognition of its exceptional contribution to traditional music and culture.

The festival also recently picked up a Nordoff Robbins Tartan Clef Award.

== See also ==
- Culture in Glasgow
- Homecoming Scotland 2009
