= Bongshang =

Background information
- Origin: Shetland, Scotland
- Genres: Folktronica, Celtic fusion
- Years active: 1991–present
- Labels: Iona, Doovf, EMI, Bleatbeat
- Members: JJ Jamieson; Bryan Peterson; Peter Gear; Jonny Polson; Archer Kemp
- Past members: Christopher Anderson; Leonard Scollay; Neil Preshaw; Gordon Tulloch; Andrew Gray
- Website: bongshang.com

Bongshang are a Scottish band from Shetland, who fuse traditional Shetland and folk styles with rock, funk, electronica and contemporary production techniques. They have been likened to Celtic fusion artists such as Shooglenifty and Martyn Bennett.

Bongshang have recorded three studio albums to date (Crude, The Hurricane Jungle and Vy-lo-fone), made numerous TV appearances, licensed tracks for TV, featured on several compilation albums and toured the UK and Europe extensively, playing with artists such as Rory Gallagher, Joan Baez, Capercaillie, Alan Stivell, Aly Bain and the Royal Scottish National Orchestra.

== History and personnel ==
Members have included banjo player JJ Jamieson (ex member of Hexology (with Harry Horse) and The Critter Hill Varmints) who has been part of every incarnation of the band, fiddler Leonard Scollay (winner of the Shetland Young Fiddler of the Year competition, BBC Young Tradition Award finalist and ex member of Shetland band Rock, Salt & Nails) and fiddler Peter Gear (also winner of the Shetland Young Fiddler of the Year competition).

Bongshang were formed in 1991 after JJ Jamieson visited Shetland whilst on tour with The Critter Hill Varmints, decided to stay and recruited musicians from the local bands he heard; fiddler Leonard Scollay, bassist Bryan Peterson (then only 15), drummer Christopher 'Kipper' Anderson and guitarist Mark Gibbons. Gibbons later emigrated to Australia and was replaced by Neil Preshaw. This line-up released the debut album Crude in 1993, recorded in the back room of the Garrison Theatre in Lerwick.

Bongshang toured frequently around this time regularly headlining concerts and festivals such as Festival Interceltique de Lorient, Nantes Celtica and Celtic Connections.

Scollay left to concentrate on touring with Rock, Salt & Nails and was replaced by fiddler Peter Gear who brought a new sound to the band with his use of the Skyinbow electric violin, and Gear and Preshaw began to make extensive use of effects processors during gigs. Bongshang's live appearances became less frequent during this period, preferring the studio environment in Shetland where they were able to experiment with multilayering instruments, samples and loops. Bongshang recorded The Hurricane Jungle with this line-up, released in 1996.

Preshaw and Peterson moved to Glasgow soon after and were replaced by guitarist Gordon Tulloch and bassist Andrew Gray. Scollay returned to the live line-up and for a time the band featured two fiddles. Gear left before the band recorded the Vy-lo-fone album in 1999, a fusion of electronic beats and banjo driven tunes.

Bongshang continued to make rare live appearances through the 2000s, with Peterson and Gray sharing bass duties and Gear and/or Scollay on fiddle.

The current line up is reported to feature Shoormal drummer Archer Kemp and guitarist Jonny Polson with Jamieson, Peterson and Gear.

In 2010 film production company B4 Films published a webpage which seemed to indicate the band were working on a feature film soundtrack

In 2011 members of the band collaborated with the Royal Scottish National Orchestra on a piece of music performed on the island of Foula, the UK's most remote inhabited islands, and broadcast live on the Internet.

In 2013 Bongshang released a series of videos accompanied by new compositions (see Discography) including a screening to an audience in Mareel during the 'Back From Beyond' project concert.

== Reviews ==
Their individual styles combine to make a new and innovative sound, blending traditional and contemporary elements from several world sources, and pinning it all together, the one thing synonymous with Shetland – talent.

— Scottish musician and TV presenter Phil Cunnigham (MBE) – extract from sleeve notes for the Crude album (see Discography)

Much inventive cross-generic tinkering is going on within Scottish traditional music at present, and particularly worthy of mention is Shetland's Bongshang, whose debut Crude achieves an immensely atmospheric whole from dashes of U2, Tindersticks and a banjo-led sound that builds an entire musical hyperspace highway from the theme music blueprint of The Hitchhiker's Guide to the Galaxy.

— Extract from Mojo magazine review of the Crude album

Reissue for the rather inspirational Shetland combo of their debut, but two years old. A luxurious mix of tradition, technology and sheer braces-bustin’ exuberance.

— Extract from Folk Roots magazine review of the Crude album (reissue)

(Bongshang have) a cussed dedication to their own peculiar, original vision. A geographical and cultural commitment to home, to Shetland. A painstaking refusal to release music they don't believe in, or these days to perform on any but their own terms

Startling in its simplicity (never has the ascetic traditionalism of Shetlandic tunes seemed so powerful) astounding in its complexity (Launderette surely sees the gathering of all Bongshang's many influences into a sinuous, sinewy whole). Focused and assured. Wild and controlled. Accessible and oblique. Both surfing the Zeitgeist and facing the breakers head on.

— BBC Radio Scotland presenter Tom Morton – extract from sleeve notes for the Vy-lo-fone album (see Discography)

Bongshang are perverse devils with a scheme in mind and nothings going to drive them from it. Here are ten tracks which redefine the sounds they grew up with and rather than just simply rock up a bunch of reels, they’ve used what they know to make stunning new music, music that's still packed with Shetland experience. Take for instance ‘Kalifornia’, a great job of just two minutes packed with Celtic longing and soundscape, it closes out just as if it were an old air. ‘Myrackle’ opens with the sea ending off into a perfect lazy jig for the tired and dispossessed. ‘Launderette’ picks up the pace with strangulated vocals and bursts of banjo breakdown filtered over Fripp-like pulses. All through chunks of acoustic instrumentation break through the veneer and threaten to reclaim their souls, but Bongshang are too wise and lope of into their own corner populated with lofi ideas and a steel guitar.

— Extract from Folk Roots magazine review of the Vy-lo-fone album

Ladies and gentlemen, please welcome Scotland's most innovative band – Bongshang

— Ian McQueen – introducing the band at Queen's Hall, Edinburgh in 2005

Bongshang are one of Shetland's most innovative bands, blending astral fiddle soundscapes, blissful banjo cadences and a pulsating rhythm section to deliver their characteristically eclectic compositions. They fuse folk, funk, rock and electronica influences with cutting edge production techniques to craft their unique signature sound.... Bongshang's live concerts, notable for their hard edged dance rhythms and skewed traditional tunes, featured pioneering use of samples and effects processors to supplement the live instruments. Their innovation is only matched by their enigmatic tendencies, with increasingly rare performances and a decade long sabbatical since their last recording.

— Shetland – Pride of Place website (2011)

- Bongshang described themselves as playing "punk trad folk rock" in an interview with Candy Schwartz. She described the sound as "Bo Diddley with ferocious breaks" and "fine fiddling"
- The Shetland Music website wrote that Bongshang "took traditional influences by the scruff of the neck way back when, and catapulted them into a whole new realm of cool respectability"
- The Boston Phoenix wrote that Bongshang "brings to mind Iggy Pop with a banjo"
- FolkWorld magazine described Bongshang as "folk-pop fusion"
- The Scottish Music Centre described Bongshang as combining "traditional Shetland music and modern hard-edged dance rhythm"
- A website related to the history of Acidcroft noted that "Bongshang are to say the least reclusive and shy away from publicity... they are fast becoming the stuff of Urban myth and legend"

== Discography ==
=== Studio albums ===
- Crude (1993)
- The Hurricane Jungle (1996)
- Vy-lo-fone (1999)

=== Videos ===
- Outcast (2013) – Bongshang website link – featuring brass players from the Royal Scottish National Orchestra and footage of the 2013 South Mainland Up Helly Aa Galley Burning.
- Morita Pt 1 (2013) – Bongshang website link
- Still Standing Still (2013) – Back From Beyond website link – featuring Mary Ann Kennedy on harp and footage from the Shetland Moving Image Archive.
- Sirenik (2013) – Bongshang website link – purportedly featuring time lapse footage of a band member's son's face, composed of a photo taken each day for the first ten years of his life.

=== Compilations ===
- Folk N Hell – EMI (Blue Note Records in the US) (1996) – "If and When" from Crude appears on this compilation of celtic fusion artists inc. Shooglenifty, Dougie MacLean, Jim Sutherland, The Poozies, Tannas and Old Blind Dogs
- Indigenous Tribes – Iona Records (1998) – "The Floggin' Set" from Crude appears on this compilation of Celtic rock bands inc. Wolfstone, Tartan Amoebas, The Pearlfishers, Humpff Family and Paul Mounsey
- Seriously Scottish – Music from Contemporary Scotland – SSR (1999) – "Probleme" from The Hurricane Jungle appears on this double CD compilation of contemporary Scottish music inc. tracks from Scottish Chamber Orchestra, BT Scottish Ensemble, James MacMillan, BBC Scottish Symphony Orchestra, The Battlefield Band, Brian Kellock, Tommy Smith, Martyn Bennett, bis, Teenage Fanclub, The Delgados, AC Acoustics, Idlewild, The Needles, Adventures in Stereo and Roddy Frame
- Tracks North (Music From Shetland) – Shetland Arts Trust – "At the Mercy" from Vy-lo-fone appears on this compilation of Shetland artists inc. Filska, Fiddlers' Bid, Chris Stout, Rock, Salt & Nails, Shoormal, Hom Bru, Brian Gear, Shetland Fiddlers' Society, Malachy Tallack and Jillian Isbister
- XS Sessions – Bleatbeat Records (2000) – A remix of "Cassini" from Vy-lo-fone appears on this compilation of non-traditional Shetland artists inc. Malachy Tallack, Solar Polar Bear and a solo track from Bongshang fiddler Peter Gear (Callisthenics)
- Thistle Do – The Right Sharo Jaggy Bit – Iona (2004) – "The Floggin’ Set" from Crude appears on this compilation of Scottish artists inc. Aly Bain, Phil Cunnigham, Hom Bru, Ossian, Paul Mounsey, Wolfstone, Oliver Schroer, Karen Matheson and Fiona Kennedy
- The Authentic Sound of Shetland – Songlines (2011) – A live version of "D-Drone", a previously unreleased recording, appears on this compilation of Shetland artists distributed as a covermount CD on the January/February 2011 issue of 'Songlines' magazine
