= Live (String Sisters album) =

Live album by String Sisters
- Released: 8 March 2007
- Recorded: 2005/06
- Genre: Celtic; Irish traditional Folk
- Length: 62:23
- Label: Grappa (Rest of world, Norway); Compass Records (US)
- Producer: String Sisters

String Sisters chronology
Live (2007)	Between Wind and Water (2018)

Professional ratings
Review scores
Source	Rating
Allmusic	4/5 stars

Live is a live album from the international music group String Sisters. The CD/DVD was recorded on the group's Norway tour in 2005/6 and was released in November 2007. Live features traditional and newly composed sets arranged and written respectively by the band members.

The album was released in 2009 by Compass Records in North America and at the end of that year was longlisted for a Grammy award. Live missed the shortlist, but bandmember Liz Carroll was nominated for another project.

== Track listing ==
The CD and DVD have two track lists, composed mainly of the same tracks with a few additions to the DVD.

=== CD edition ===
No.	Title	Writer / Arranger	Length
1.	"Shetland Fiddle Diva / Kinyon's Jig / Kinyon's Reel / Lad O'Beirne's"	Knowles / Lowthian / Lowthian / O'Beirne	6:17
2.	"The Champion Jig Goes to Columbia / Pat & Al's Jig"	Carroll	3:14
3.	"The Matchmaking Song (Tá Mo Chleamhnas a' Dhéanamh)"	Traditional; Ní Mhaonaigh	5:51
4.	"G-Strings"	Lien	3:32
5.	"The Horsebell Tune"	Traditional	2:38
6.	"Saviour of the World / Gabhaim Molta Bríde"	Traditional; Härdelin & Ní Mhaonaigh	5:29
7.	"Luseblus"	Lien	3:52
8.	"Rumble Thy Bellyful"	Knowles	3:10
9.	"Da Trowie Burn"	Traditional	3:56
10.	"The Fly and Dodger"	Carroll	3:08
11.	"The Hussar / Toss the Fiddles"	Knowles / Traditional	4:35
12.	"Wackidoo"	Lien, Rasch	3:57
13.	"The April Child / The Joy of It!"	Lien / MacDonald	6:39
14.	"Fremont Center / Ahint Da Dawks O' Voe / Come Awa In / Paddy's Trip to Scotland / Dinky's"	Anderson / Traditional / Traditional / Traditional / Liz Carroll	6:18

== DVD Edition ==
1. The April Child / The Joy of It!
2. Introduction (Annbjorg)
3. G-strings
4. The Champaign Jig Goes to Columbia / Pat and Al's Jig
5. Introduction (Liz C)
6. For the Love of Music / Tune for the Girls / Land ta Lea
7. Introduction (Emma)
8. The Hussar / Toss the Fiddles
9. Introduction (Catríona)
10. Da Trowie Burn / The Fly and Dodger
11. Like a Fire and Like a Storm
12. Introduction (Liz K)
13. Rumble Thy Bellyful
14. Introduction (Mairéad)
15. Tune for Frankie / Red Crow / Leslie's
16. Presentation Band (Annbjorg) / Introduction (Mairéad)
17. The Matchmaking Song (Tá Mo Chleamhnas a' Dhéanamh)
18. Shetland Fiddle Diva / Kinyon's Jig / Kinyon's Reel / Lad O'Beirne's
19. The Horsebell Tune
20. Saviour of the World / Gabhaim Molta Bríde / Luseblus
21. Farewell (Annbjorg)
22. Fremont Center / Ahind da daeks o' Voe / Come awa'in / Paddy's Trip to Scotland / Dinky's

Encore

23. The Murder in Halsingland
24. Wackidoo

== Personnel ==
=== String Sisters ===
- Mairéad Ní Mhaonaigh – Irish fiddle, vocals (Ireland)
- Annbjørg Lien – Hardanger Fiddle (Norway)
- Liz Knowles – fiddle (USA)
- Catriona MacDonald – fiddle (Shetland)
- Liz Carroll – (USA)
- Emma Härdelin – (Sweden)

=== Misters ===
- David Milligan – piano (Scotland)
- Tore Bruvoll – guitar (Norway)
- Conrad Molleson – bas (Scotland)
- James Mackintosh – drums (Scotland)
