= Crude =

Crude can refer to:

- Crude oil or simply crude, the unprocessed form of petroleum
- Crude (2007 film), an Australian documentary about the geology and economics of crude oil
- Crude (2009 film), an American documentary about oil companies and lawsuits in Ecuador
- Crude (album), by Bongshang, 1993
- Crude (comic), a comic book series by Steve Orlando and Garry Brown
- Oklahoma Crude, a former National Indoor Football League team
