= Vintervisor =

Vintervisor (Winter Songs)

Studio album by Triakel
- Released: November 2000
- Recorded: May–June 2000
- Genre: Swedish folk, Christmas
- Length: 45:33
- Label: Mono Music AB
- Producer: Triakel, Gustav Hylén, Bernard Löhr

Triakel chronology
Triakel (1998)	Vintervisor (Winter Songs) (2000)	Sånger från 63° N (2004)

Professional ratings
Review scores
Source	Rating
Allmusic	4/5 stars

Vintervisor is the name of the second album by the Swedish folk band Triakel. It was released in late 2000 on Mono Music AB.

== Track listing ==
1. "Julvisa från Älvdalen (Christmas Carol from Älvdalen)" – 3:01
2. "Bergslagsjul (Christmas In The Mining District)" – 2:13
3. "Er framtid blive lyckelig (Good Fortune And Joy)" – 3:18
4. "Staffansvisa från Orust (St Stephen’s Day Carol from Orust)" – 1:47
5. "Innan gryningen (Before Dawn)" – 3:28
6. "Torspar-julaftas-våggvisa (The Crofter’s Christmas Eve Lullaby)" – 4:12
7. "God morgon här kär fader vår (Good Morning To You, Master Dear)" – 2:19
8. "Det blir en julhelg glad (A Joyful Christmas It Will Be)" – 3:52
9. "Julvisa i Finnmarken/Isfärden" – 3:39
10. "Staffansvisa från Jämtland (St Stephen’s Day Carol from Jämtland)" – 2:36
11. "Adventspsalm (Advent Hymn)" – 3:17
12. "Mormors julstjärna (Grandma’s Christmas Star)" – 2:35
13. "Knalle Juls vals (The Christmas Tree Waltz)" – 2:32
14. "Julgranspolska (The Christmas Tree Polska)" – 2:15
15. "Tackvisan" – 4:16

== Personnel ==
- Emma Härdelin - vocals
- Kjell-Erik Eriksson - fiddle
- Janne Strömstedt - harmonium
- Benny Andersson - accordion
- Triakel - song arrangements, producers
- Gustav Hylén - sound technician, producer
- Bernard Löhr - producer, CD mastering
- Claes Grundsten - photographer
- Gerry Johansson - photographer
- Peder Majiet - photographer
- Bengt Olof Olsson - photographer
- Karl-Roland Schröter - photographer
- Gunnar Smoliansky - photographer
- Rune Söderqvist - graphics design
- Henrik Täppmark - graphics design
