= Young Fiddler of the Year =

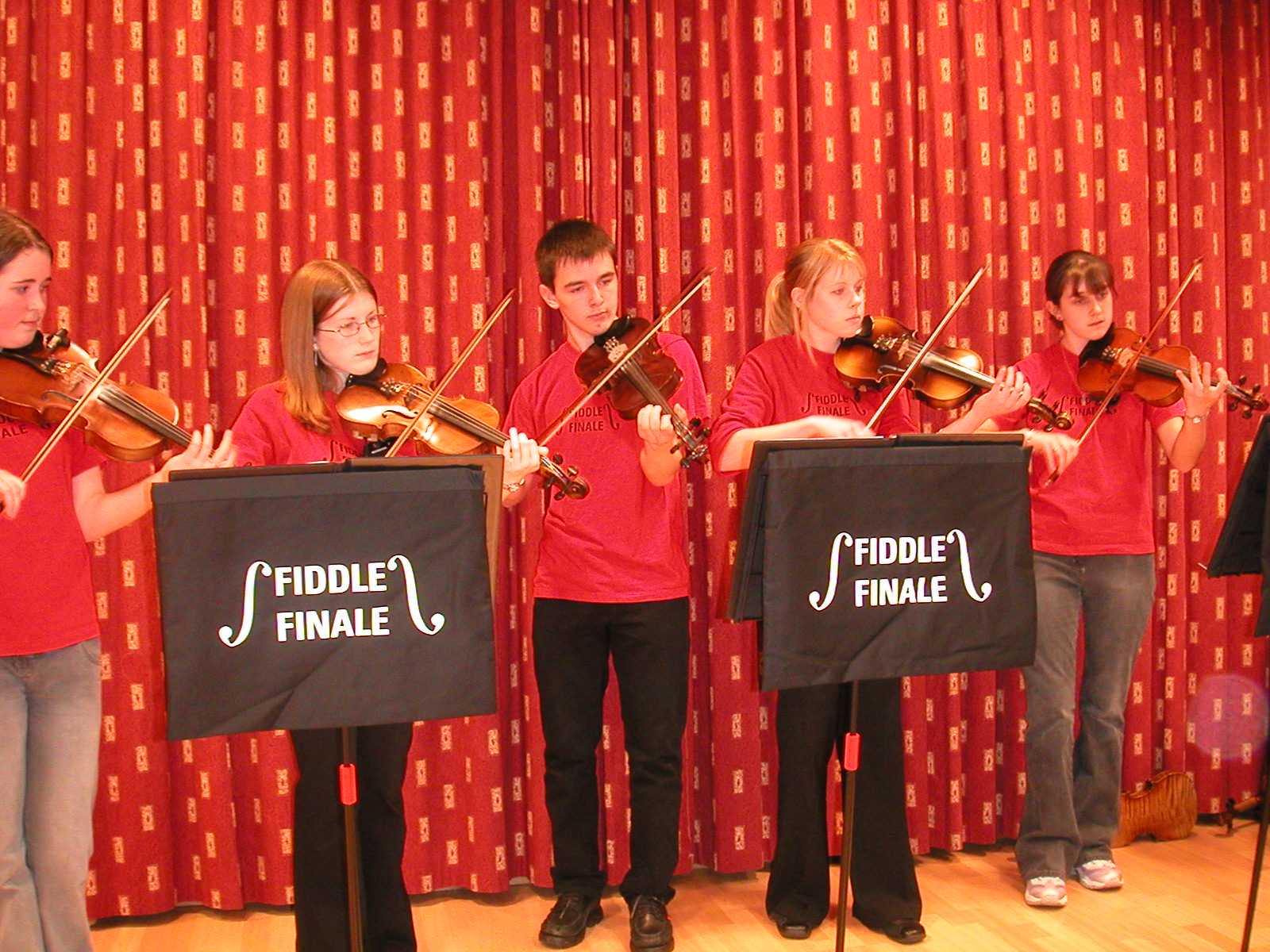
Shetland teenage fiddlers

Shetland's Young Fiddler of the Year is an annual competition held over two days, organised by the Shetland Folk Society.

It is open to fiddle players aged 16 or under from Shetland, with around 80 entrants each year. The highest number of entries received was 110 in 2014. There are two main categories, 'Open' encompassing all styles and 'Traditional' focussing on the traditional Shetland style. Each category has junior, intermediate, and senior sections.

== Previous winners ==
Previous winners of the main 'Open' section include:

- Ami Grains(2025, aged 15)
- Kristie Williamson (2024, aged 14)
- Evie Williamson (2023, aged 14)
- Yelena Anderson (2022)
- Magnus Williamson (2021, aged 15)
- Ashley Hay (2019, aged 13)
- Emma Leask (2018, aged 14)
- George Spence (2017)
- Jodie Smith (2016, aged 13)
- Bryden Priest (2015, aged 15)
- Sophie Moar (2014, aged 16)
- Callum Watt (2013, aged 15)
- Laura Smith (2012, aged 14)
- Hannah Adamson (2011, aged 13)
- Liza Fullerton (2010, aged 15)
- Chapman Cheng (2009)
- Maggie Adamson (2008, aged 16)
- Miriam Brett (2007)
- Ryan Couper (2006)
- Mary Rutherford (2005) Member of Kollifirbolli
- Lyn Anderson (2004)
- Laura Lockyer (2003)
- Gemma Donald (2002)
- Lois Nicol (2001) Member of Fullsceilidh Spelemannslag
- Vaila Tait (2000)
- Mark Laurenson (1999, aged 14) Member of Fullsceilidh Spelemannslag
- Alexander Hutchison (1998)
- Bethany Reid (1997)
- Andrew Gifford (1996) Member of Fiddlers' Bid
- Jenna Reid (1995, aged 14) Solo performer and member of Filska, Dochas and Blazin' Fiddles
- Stuart Grains (1994) Member of Fullsceilidh Spelemannslag
- Magnus Johnson (1993)
- Bryan Gear (1992)
- Chris Stout (1991) Solo performer, composer, session musician and member of Fiddlers' Bid
- David Keith (1990)
- Jenny Napier (1989)
- Peter Gear (1988) Now with Bongshang
- Andrew Deyell (1987)
- Emma Johnson (1986) Previously with Rock, Salt & Nails and Shetland's Young Heritage)
- Jeanna Johnson (1985) Previously with Shetland's Young Heritage
- Jacqueline Sinclair (1984)
- Catriona MacDonald (1983) Academic, solo performer and member of Blazin' Fiddles. Previously with Shetland's Young Heritage)
- Margaret Robertson (1982)
