= Crude (album) =

Studio album by Bongshang
- Released: 19 November 1993
- Recorded: Garrison Theatre, Lerwick, Shetland
- Label: Doovf, Iona
- Producer: Bongshang & Stevie Hook

Bongshang chronology
Crude (1993)	The Hurricane Jungle (1996)

Professional ratings
Review scores
Source	Rating
Folk Roots	(favourable)
The List	(favourable)
Dirty Linen	(favourable)
Folk Roots	(favourable)
Mojo	(favourable)

Crude is the first studio album from Shetland based band Bongshang.

== Track listing ==
1. "Le Introducement" - 1:02
2. "Things to Come" - 3:59
3. "The Floggin' Set" - 2:04
4. "If & When" - 5:01
5. "Lee Highway Blues" - 2:41
6. "Phosphene/Tamlin" - 6:48
7. "The Hangman's Reel" - 1:58
8. "Dig a Hole" - 4:55
9. "Scotland/Frosty Morning" - 3:34
10. "A.K.A. Crude" - 4:35
11. "Wedding Row" - 5:54
12. "Reprise" - 2:05

== Personnel ==
- JJ Jamieson - banjo, vocals, lawnmower
- Bryan Peterson - bass guitar, double bass
- Leonard Scollay - fiddle
- Neil Preshaw - electric guitar, acoustic guitar
- Christopher 'Kipper' Anderson - drums, percussion

== Sleeve notes ==
I first had the pleasure of meeting Bongshang at a concert in Lerwick in September 1993. Although it took me a long time to say their name, it only took me a few seconds to become a fan of their music. Their individual styles combine to make a new and innovative sound, blending traditional and contemporary elements from several world sources, and pinning it all together, the one thing synonymous with the Shetland Islands - talent.

It won't take you long to learn their name, you'll be hearing a lot of it.

— Phil Cunningham (MBE)

== Production notes ==
- This was the first CD to be produced in Shetland and sold out in four days
- Crude was recorded in the Garrison Theatre, Lerwick, by sound engineer Stevie Hook and Bongshang members
- The album was originally released on CD and cassette on Bongshang's own label "Doovf Records". It was later re-released and distributed internationally by the "Iona" record label.
- The song 'Dig a Hole' features lyrics by Harry Horse of Swamptrash
