= Sånger från 63° N =

Studio album by Triakel
- Released: June 2004
- Recorded: January 2004
- Genre: Swedish folk
- Length: 47:17
- Label: Amigo, Triakel
- Producer: Gustav Hylén

Triakel chronology
'Vintervisor' (2000)	Sånger från 63° N (2004)	'Ten Years of Triakel' (2005)

Sånger från 63° N (Songs from 63° N) is the name of the third album by the Swedish folk band Triakel. It was released on 23 June 2004 on Amigo Records. The songs are mostly traditional Swedish folk songs from the province of Jämtland, though some are recent compositions. The text of I Jamtlann (Jämtland) is in a Jämtland dialect. The rest of the songs are in Swedish.

== Reception ==
Professional ratings
Review scores
Source	Rating
Allmusic	4/5 stars
Helsingborgs Dagblad	4

AllMusic noted the "chemistry between the [band's] members" and wrote that singer Emma Härdelin was best when presenting tragic songs. Also the reviewer for Helsingborgs Dagblad wrote that Triakel benefitted from the cooperation between the instrumental musicians and Härdelin's vocal performance.

== Track listing ==
No.	Title	Length
1.	"Veit (Where D’you Think...? )"	2:22
2.	"N'Lars och N'Mas (Maclay and Macrae)"	1:44
3.	"Lihll'-Pe i Floa (Wee Willie Wattie)"	2:06
4.	"Lilltåa, Tåtilla (Little Toe)"	4:08
5.	"Grannar och vänner (Friends and Neighbours)"	2:52
6.	"Min docka (My Pretty Maid)"	3:43
7.	"Barnamörderskan (The Cruel Mother)"	3:12
8.	"Guds fruktan/Steklåt (Trust in God)"	3:12
9.	"Älskaren i gluggen (The Lover at the Window)"	1:58
10.	"Nu haver denna dag (Now One More Day)"	4:36
11.	"Den gråtande drängen (The Farm Lad Who Cried)"	2:51
12.	"Bli som far (In Your Father’s Footsteps)"	3:17
13.	"Tordyveln/Polska (The Dung Beetle’s Wedding)"	2:38
14.	"Långmasaguten (Young Ricky Rider)"	1:29
15.	"Farväl alla vänner (Farewell to You All)"	3:55
16.	"I Jamtlann (Jämtland)"	3:04

== Personnel ==
- Emma Härdelin - vocals
- Kjell-Erik Eriksson - fiddle
- Janne Strömstedt - harmonium
- Anders Larsson - guest vocals on Min docka
- Triakel - song arrangements
- Gustav Hylén - producer
- Lennart Jonasson - photographer
- Pelle Rumert - cover design
- Syre Reklambyrå - cover design
