= Ewen Thomson =

Scottish luthier

Ewen Thomson is a Scottish luthier, specialising in violins, violas and cellos.

Thomson was born in Fair Isle, Shetland, on 10 October 1971 and grew up in a musical family. At the age of 16 he began studying at the School of Violin Making, Newark, graduating with merit. He was the youngest ever student to be accepted onto the course. In 1991 he returned to Fair Isle and set up a workshop. He later moved his business to Sandwick on the Shetland mainland and then to a workshop at his home in Channerwick.

His instruments are based on classical Italian models and are played by, for example, Chris Stout, also from Fair Isle, and members of Shetland band Fiddlers' Bid, Kevin Henderson and Andrew Gifford. Other folk musicians playing his instruments include Bruce Molsky, Manus McGuire, Megan Henderson (Breabach), Bryan Gear, Ross Couper (Peatbog Faeries) and Graham Mackenzie.

Commissions have included violins for the National Museum of Scotland, and the Mendelssohn on Mull Trust.

Thomson plays fiddle with several groups including Haltadans. He has formerly been a part of Fullsceilidh Spelemannslag and Friðarey.
