= Triakel =

Swedish folk band

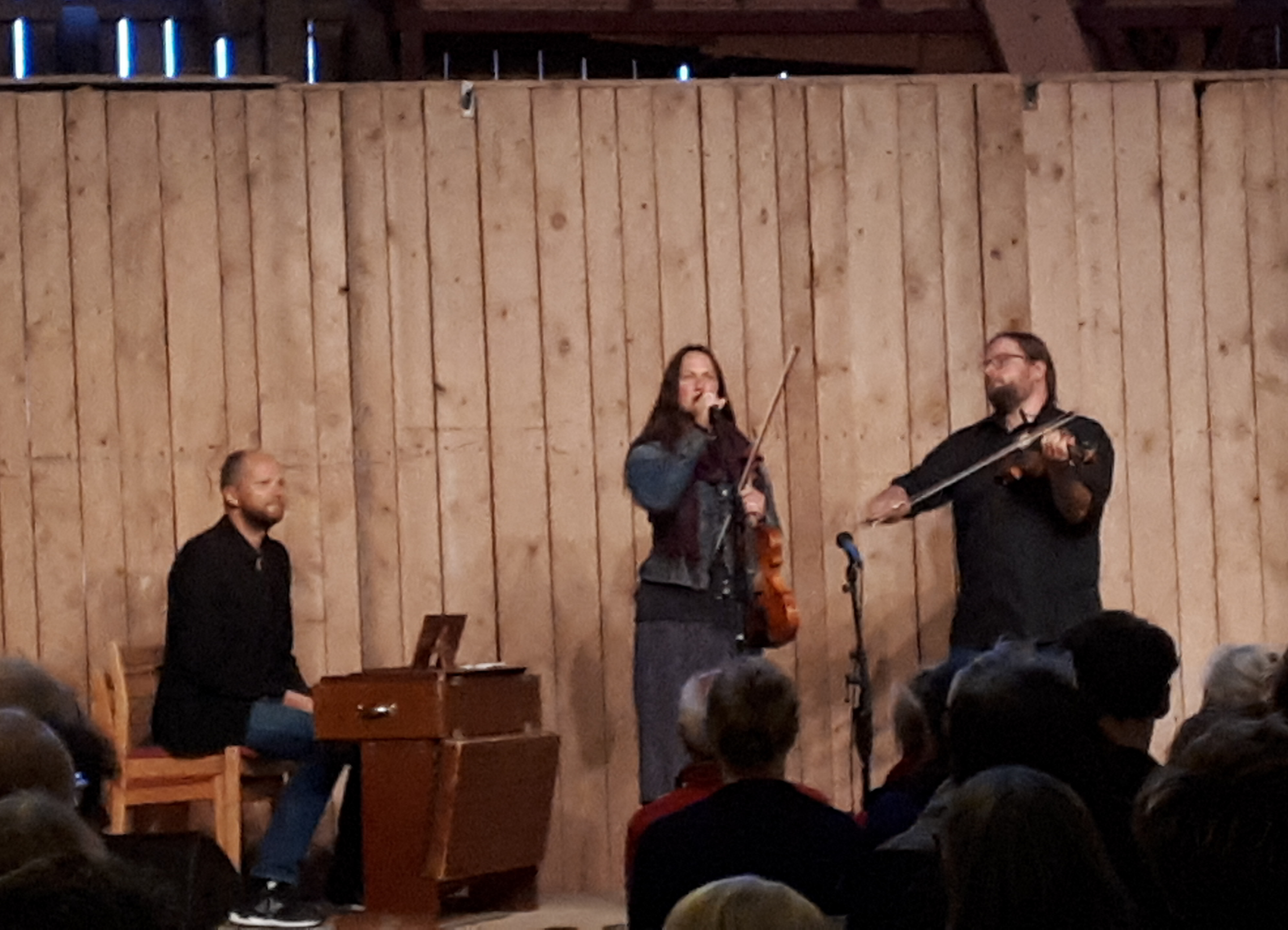
- Triakel in 2018

Background information
- Origin: Sweden
- Genres: Folk; Nordic Roots Revival
- Years active: 1995–present
- Label: Triakel Records
- Members: Emma Härdelin; Kjell-Erik Eriksson; Janne Strömstedt
- Website: http://www.triakel.se/

Triakel is a Swedish folk band. They mostly perform old Swedish folk songs, particularly those from the Jämtland area, but also include songs by contemporary folk artists.

Triakel was founded in 1995 by Emma Härdelin (Garmarna), Kjell-Erik Eriksson (Hoven Droven) and Janne Strömstedt (former Hoven Droven member); Eriksson and Strömstedt had to perform together using only the fiddle and harmonium on New Year's Eve 1994 following a lost bet, and the performance was so successful that they decided to continue with the project. Härdelin, later on, joined the newly formed band as the singer, and the name "Triakel" (a kind of sweet, black liquorice in the Swedish dialect of Jämtland; the word is etymologically related to the English "treacle") was chosen after a long discussion.

== Discography ==
=== Albums ===
- Triakel (May 1998, released by MNW Records Group AB)
- Vintervisor (Winter Songs) (November 2000, released by Mono Music AB)
- Sånger från 63° N (Songs from 63° N) (September 2004, released by Triakel Records)
- Ten Years of Triakel (2005, released by Triakel Records)
- Ulrikas minne — Visor från Frostviken (2011)
- Thyra (2014, released by Westpark Music)
- Händelser i Nord (March 2019, released by Triakel Records)

=== Singles ===
- "Innan gryningen" (1999, featuring Benny Andersson of ABBA)
