= Ten Years of Triakel =

Studio album by Triakel
- Released: 2005
- Recorded: 1996–2005
- Genre: Swedish folk
- Length: 51:17
- Label: Triakel Records

Triakel chronology
Sånger från 63° N (2004)	Ten Years of Triakel (2005)	Ulrikas minne — Visor från Frostviken (2011)

Ten Years of Triakel is the name of the fourth album by the Swedish folk band Triakel. It was released in 2005 as a limited, numbered edition of 2,000 copies on Triakel Records and features recordings from live Triakel performances between 1996 and 2005. The CD was not sold in stores.

== Track listing ==
1. Majvisa (Mayday Song) - 3:05
2. Skepparschottis (The Skipper's Schottische) - 2:25
3. Du har låtit din kärlek få försvinna (You have let your love grow cold) - 3:28
4. Polska - 2:04
5. I Österland (Far in the east) - 3:12
6. Skämtvisa om roddare (Comic song about an oarsman) - 2:57
7. Grannar og vänner (Friends and neighbours) - 3:11
8. Bläck (Ink) - 4:04
9. Begåvningsmarsch (March played at parties) - 1:21
10. Emma solo - 2:15
11. Gammal og grå (Old and grey) - 2:34
12. Rallarguten (The Navvy lad) - 3:46
13. I himmelen (In paradise) - 4:49
14. För i värla (In the olden days) - 3:36
15. Den blomstertid nu kommer (The land bursts out in blossom) - 5:40
16. Solen sig sänker (The setting of the sun) - 2:50

== Personnel ==
- Emma Härdelin - vocals/fiddle
- Janne Strömstedt - harmonium
- Kjell-Erik Eriksson - fiddle
- Björn Höglund- triangle on "Skepparschottis"
- Bo Lindberg - accordion on "Skepparschottis"
- Trispann - guest musicians on "Gammel og grå"
- Brina & Strings.si - guest musicians on "I himmelen"
- Emily Smith Band - guest musicians on "I himmelen"
- Rickard Näslin - guest musician on "För i värla"
- Triakel - all arrangements, all photos except cover photo
- Björn Höglund - mastering
- Lennart Jonasson - cover photo
- Mats Öhr / Inkprint promotion - cover design
- Alistair Cochrane - booklet translation
