= Scottish Ensemble =

Scottish string orchestra

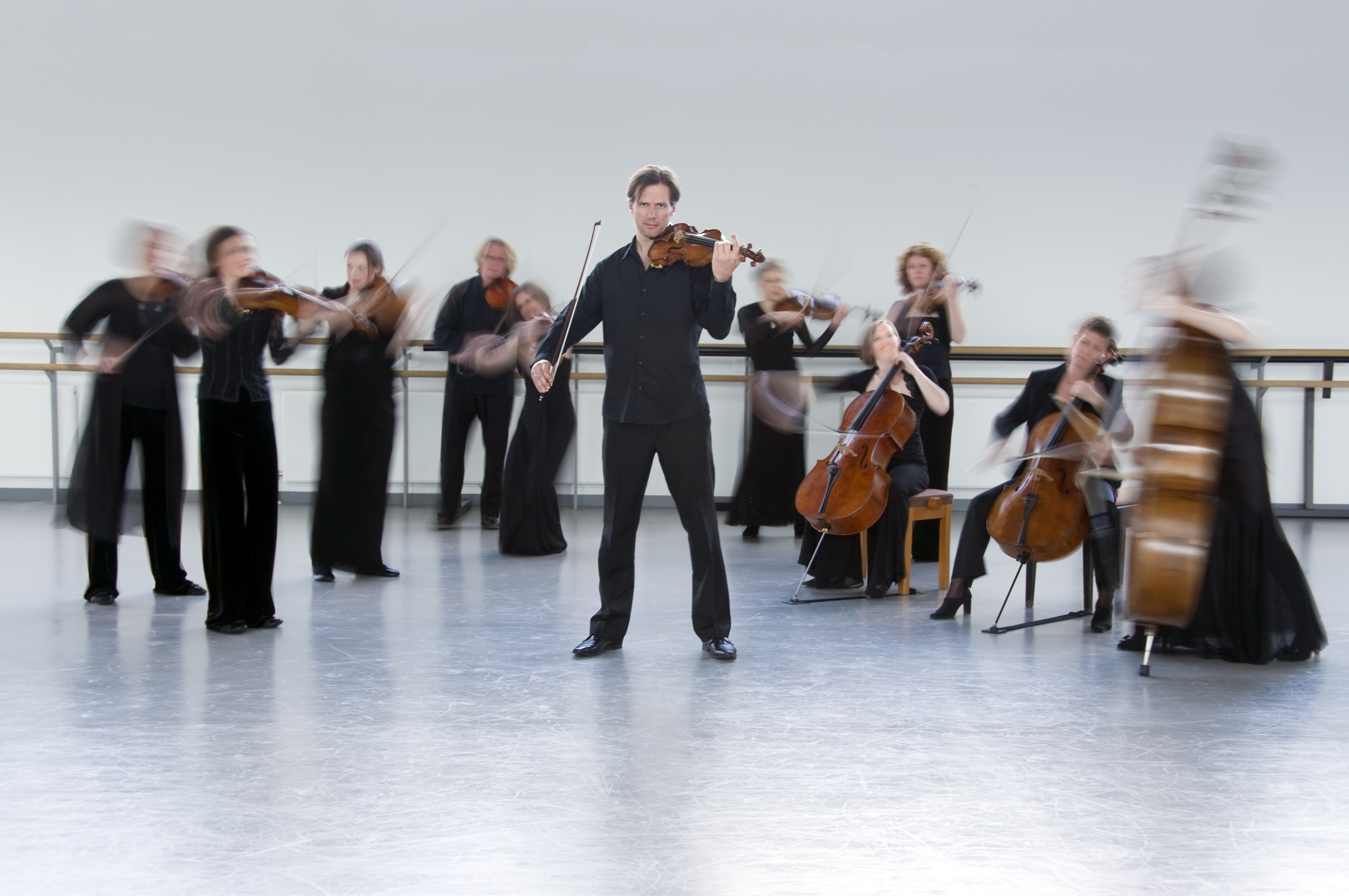
The UK's only professional string orchestra, Scottish Ensemble. Photo: Joanne Green.

Scottish Ensemble is a professional string orchestra based in Glasgow, Scotland and led by Artistic Director and violinist Jonathan Morton.

Scottish Ensemble also collaborates with soloists. Recently guest artists have included trumpeter Alison Balsom, tenor Toby Spence, violinist Anthony Marwood, cellist Pieter Wispelwey and violist Lawrence Power. The group also seeks out collaborations with musicians from different traditions, and has recently performed alongside Scottish folk musicians Catriona McKay, Chris Stout and Aly Bain, DJ Alex Smoke, Finnish violinist Pekka Kuusisto and American bassist Edgar Meyer.

As well as touring across Scotland, Scottish Ensemble perform in the UK and internationally. Alongside performances at venues across London including Kings Place, The Barbican Centre and Wigmore Hall, Scottish Ensemble receives regular invitations to tour abroad and in recent years the group has performed in Sweden, Norway, Germany, France, Istanbul, China, Japan, Brazil and North America.

Scottish Ensemble has produced a number of recordings on labels including Linn Records and EMI. Its most recent release, Anno, is a recording of its 2016 production with Anna Meredith which was released on the Moshi Moshi imprint in August 2018.

Founded in 1969 by violinist Leonard Friedman and Daphne Godson, in 2019 Scottish Ensemble celebrates its 50th anniversary. The group is a registered charity.

== Programming style ==
Formed in 1969 as the Scottish Baroque Ensemble, by the violinists Leonard Friedman and Daphne Godson, Scottish Ensemble's extensive repertoire spans from the Baroque to the present day. The group is known for its distinctive programming style, which blends music from different centuries, musical periods, genres and styles, often linked together thematically. It is also known for its presentation of more unusual or rarely performed pieces.

Committed to expanding the string repertoire, Scottish Ensemble also regularly commissions new works. In recent years, these have included new pieces by composers including Sir John Tavener, James MacMillan, Sally Beamish, Martin Suckling, John Woolrich, Craig Armstrong, Luke Bedford, Thea Musgrave, Anna Meredith and, most recently, Ailie Robertson.

== Events ==
Scottish Ensemble regularly tours across Scotland, the UK and the world.

In Scotland, as well as its regular touring cities of Glasgow, Edinburgh, Dundee, Perth, Aberdeen, Inverness and Dumfries, the group performs in smaller towns and more remote locations across the country. Scottish Ensemble has presented an annual series of concerts at London’s Wigmore Hall and, more recently, performed at Kings Place and The Barbican Centre. The group has also appeared at the BBC Proms and at festivals including Edinburgh International, Edinburgh Fringe, City of London, Aldeburgh and St Magnus festivals. In 2013 SE undertook an 11-date tour of the US, performing in halls including Walt Disney Hall and New York Town Hall.

Scottish Ensemble delivers performances from more traditional classical concerts, in venues across the UK, Scotland and the world, to adventurous productions which combine classical music with other art forms, including theatre, visual art and contemporary dance.

Since 2014, the group have presented one major cross art form project a year. In 2014, Scottish Ensemble collaborated with visual artist Toby Paterson to create 20th-Century Perspectives: City Spaces and Strings, a site-specific performance designed for a previously-derelict modernist landmark in Glasgow, which combined 20th-century architecture, visual art and music.

In 2015, Scottish Ensemble worked with Swedish contemporary dance company Andersson Dance to present Goldberg Variations - ternary patterns for insomnia, a 21st-century interpretation of Bach’s masterpiece in which musicians are choreographed on stage alongside dancers.

In 2016, Scottish Ensemble collaborated with composer/producer Anna Meredith and her sister, the visual artist Eleanor Meredith, on Anno. This new commission combined Vivaldi's Four Seasons with new electronic compositions by Anna Meredith, creating one continuous piece of music. Anno was released as a recording in August 2018 to great critical acclaim, including BBC 6 Music's Album Of The Day.

In 2017, the group joined with pioneering Scottish theatre company Vanishing Point to create Tabula Rasa, a theatrical production which centred around the live performance of music by Arvo Pärt. A recording of Tabula Rasa was hosted on BBC iPlayer from November 2018 to January 2019.

In 2018, Scottish Ensemble worked again with Andersson Dance on its second collaboration, Prelude - skydiving from a dream, which premiered in Scotland in November 2018 to critical acclaim, with five-star reviews from The Herald, The Scotsman and Bachtrack.

== Media and recordings ==
Concerts are regularly broadcast on BBC Radio 3 and BBC Radio Scotland, and there is a collection of recordings available. SE’s extensive recording catalogue includes: EMI Classics’ top-selling CD of 2010: Italian Concertos with Alison Balsom; recent recordings of Shostakovich, Tchaikovsky, Takemitsu and Debussy on Linn Records; and a recording of its 2016 collaboration with composer and producer Anna Meredith, released on Moshi Moshi Records in August 2018.

Scottish Ensemble has produced a number of short behind-the-scenes documentaries around its major projects, as well as a full-length recording of its 2017 project with Vanishing Point. The group also enjoys a relationship with BBC Arts. As well as the site hosting its behind-the-scenes films about its projects with Andersson Dance and Anna Meredith, in 2018 the full-length recording of Tabula Rasa was hosted on BBC iPlayer.

== Community and education work ==
Scottish Ensemble is also committed to a comprehensive programme of education and outreach activities. Its work in this area was developed further in 2012 with the launch of the City Residency programme, where the orchestra spends three or four days in one Scottish city providing a range of events designed to engage diverse communities.

Events as part of the City Residencies have included: tea dances, ceilidhs, community feasts, flash-mob style performances, coaching and workshops with amateur music groups, schools workshops, and free public performances. Scottish Ensemble also delivers events combining music and other art forms, which link to the group's collaborations with other art forms. These have included music-and-dance workshops, life drawing sessions, and a primary school art class using music as inspiration led by visual artist Eleanor Meredith.

Since 2015, Scottish Ensemble has delivered its SE Young Musician programme in partnership with the Royal Conservatoire of Scotland. Promising string students are invited to audition to join Scottish Ensemble musicians for a week of coaching in preparation for a public concert, held at the Royal Conservatoire of Scotland, at the end of the week. A small number of these musicians are then invited to join the group on tour across the following year to gain experience of life as a touring musician.

Scottish Ensemble also delivers regular educational programmes in both primary and secondary schools, working with educational professionals, composers and animateurs to create bespoke workshops that will enhance the current music syllabus.
