= Vy-lo-fone =

Studio album by Bongshang
- Released: 1999
- Recorded: Lerwick, Shetland
- Label: Doovf
- Producer: Bongshang

Bongshang chronology
The Hurricane Jungle (1996)	Vy-lo-fone (1999)

Professional ratings
Review scores
Source	Rating
Folk Roots	(favourable)
Dirty Linen	(favourable)

Vy-lo-fone is the third studio album from Shetland-based band Bongshang.

== Track listing ==
1. "Intro" - 0:28
2. "Myrakle" - 3:15
3. "Launderette" - 3:49
4. "Grass Widow" - 5:22
5. "Longer" - 3:45
6. "Superfresco" - 3:32
7. "Cassini" - 4:18
8. "Grass Orphan" - 1:48
9. "Wisdom" - 5:52
10. "Kalifornia" - 1:41

== Personnel ==
- JJ Jamieson - banjo, vocals, keyboards, samples
- Gordon Tulloch - guitar, vocals
- Leonard Scollay - fiddle
- Andrew Gray - bass guitar
- Christopher 'Kipper' Anderson - drums, percussion

== Guest personnel ==
- Jack Robertson - pedal steel
- Ivor Polson - mandolin
- James Henry Erikson - mandolin
- Joanna Redmond - vocals

== Sleeve notes ==
I'm in a dubious Orcadian disco, arguing with the elderly chap on the mixing desk. It's his PA system, basically, and no one else is getting to play with it. "THE FIDDLE! LOUDER!" He resolutely ignores me, peering off to the middle distance where a seething mass of St Magnus festivalities are being Bongshanged. In the end I stick my head in a bucket of Raven Ale and learn to breath [sic] beer. But the band sound OK. Not perfect, but OK.

Perfectionism is what Bongshang seek, though. And that search has brought them, at last, to vy-lo-fone, their third album. Their best, of course. Not that Crude and Hurricane Jungle weren't superb in their own right. But this is a progression of excellence, a continuum of improvement.

A bloody long time it's taken too, some might grumble. Only the third record in six years? And why aren't Bongshang superstars, anyway, in the ambient pop folk dance banjo fiddle guitar dub firmament?

Perversely, I think. A cussed dedication to their own peculiar, original vision. A geographical and cultural commitment to home, to Shetland. A painstaking refusal to release music they don't believe in, or these days to release music on anything but their own terms.

Anyway, here's vy-lo-fone, startling in its simplicity (never has the ascetic traditionalism of Shetlandic tunes seemed so powerful) astounding in its complexity (Launderette surely sees the gathering of all Bongshang's many influences into a sinuous, sinewy whole). Focused and assured. Wild and controlled. Accessible and oblique. Both surfing the Zeitgeist and facing the breakers head on.

As perfect as possible

— Tom Morton, Heylor, Shetland November 1999
