= Celtic Music (record label) =

British record labels

- Founded: 1978
- Genre: Celtic, folk
- Country of origin: England
- Location: Leeds and Harrogate, Yorkshire
- Official website: celtic-music.co.uk

Celtic Music is a British, Yorkshire-based publishing, distribution and record label, which specialized in folk and Celtic music recordings released between the 1970s to the early 2000s. As of 2025, the current legal status of the company is uncertain, and its last release of original music was in 2007.

== History ==
Celtic Music began as a publishing outlet for four books of Irish session tunes compiled by Dave Bulmer and Neil Sharpley in the 1970s, with the term first appearing on "Music from Ireland Volume 2" from 1976. It evolved into a record distribution company (CM Distribution) for other labels and then into a recording and record production operation from 1978 to around 2007 that was owned by Dave Bulmer in Leeds and Harrogate in Yorkshire, England. As well as issuing its own recordings, Celtic Music also acquired the back catalogue of other folk music record labels when the latter were on-sold, including Leader, Trailer, Rubber Records, Black Crow, Dambuster, Highway, Sweet Folk and Country, Greenwich Village, Mulligan, Broadside, Folk Heritage, and Making Waves, the majority of which, however, have not been re-issued.

The first release on Celtic Music was the eponymous album by the band Iona in 1978, while the last was Tich Frier's Shanghaied in 2007. For many years, the registered company address was in Louth, Lincolnshire.

Since at least the 2000s, many artists with recordings held by the label have argued that the catalogue is being mismanaged. Complaints include that music has been largely unavailable to the public, there has been a lack of royalty payments and accounting, and contested claims to ownership of specific recordings. In 2025 Scottish folk singer Dick Gaughan launched a legal case to gain control of seven albums claimed by Celtic Music, with arguments that include a challenge as to the actual existence of the company.

== Discography ==
The following list includes all releases credited to "Celtic Music" about which information is presently available. Item numbers marked "??" are presently untraced and may never have been issued.

=== Albums ===
- CM 001 Iona: Iona 1978 (note: this band featured Dave Bulmer, George Ormiston, Gordon Tyrrall and Tony Wilson; a different Celtic band also called "Iona" has been active from 1990 onwards, led by vocalist Joanne Hogg)
- CM 002 Tom Napper & Alistair Russell: Tripping Upstairs 1978
- CM 003 Norman Stewart & Janice Clark: Iolair - Music And Song From Scotland 1980
- CM 004 Eric Bogle: Now I'm Easy 1980 (UK release of Larrikin Records (Australia) LRF 041); also on CD CMCD 004
- CM 005 Shegui: Around The World For Sport (Irish And Scottish Music) 1980
- CM 006 Brian Miller & Charlie Soane: The Favourite Dram 1981
- CM 007 Archie Fisher: Archie Fisher 1982 (re-release of XTRA 1070, 1968); also on CD CMCD 007
- CM 008 Tim Wood: Getting Your Own Back 1982
- CM 009 Hom Bru: Obadeea - Music From Shetland And Beyond 1982
- CM 010 Willie Hunter: 1982 - Fiddle music from Shetland and Scotland 1982
- CM 011 Adam Amos & Noel Rocks: Adam Amos - Noel Rocks 1983
- CM 012 Kieran Halpin: The Man Who Lives In Bottles 1983
- CM 013 Ragged Heroes: Annual 1983
- CM 014 Tich Frier: Going Straight 1983
- CM 015 Hokum Hotshots: Maybe It's the Blues 198?
- CM 016 Gordon Tyrrall: How Can I Live At The Top Of A Mountain? 1983
- CM 017 Dick Gaughan: A Different Kind Of Love Song 1983 also on CD CMCD 017
- CM 018 Lochan: Lochan 1983
- CM 019 Chris Simpson: Listen To The Man 1984
- CM 020 Bernie Parry: Playing With Words 1984
- CM 021 Kieran Halpin: Live And Kicking 1985
- CM 022 Alan Stivell: Legend - Mojenn - Légende 1984 (?re-release)
- CM 024 Vin Garbutt: Shy Tot Pommie 1985
- CM 025 Dab Hand: High Rock And Low Glen 1985
- CM 026 Adam Amos & Noel Rocks: Casual On The Balcony 1985
- CM 027 Bob Carpenter: Silent Passage 1984 also on CD CMCD 027
- CM 028 Archie Fisher: Orfeo 1985 (re-release)
- CM 029 Barbara Dickson: From The Beggar's Mantle......Fringed With Gold 1985 (re-release)
- CM 030 Dick Gaughan: Live In Edinburgh 1985 also on CD CMCD 030
- CM 031 Archie Fisher & Barbara Dickson: Thro' The Recent Years 1986
- CM 032 ??
- CM 033 Rua: Scottish Music 1986
- CM 034 Clannad: Ring Of Gold 1986 also on CD CMCD 034
- CM 035 Spirit Of The West: Tripping Up The Stairs 1987 also on CD CMCD 035
- CM 036 Norman Stewart & Elspeth MacGillivray: Twilight To Dawning - Scottish Ceilidh Music & Song 1987
- CM 037 ??
- CM 038 Various Artists: First Irish Folk Festival, Live 1974 198?
- CM 039 Various Artists: The 2nd Irish Folk Festival on Tour (?2xLP, also on 2xCD) 1988 (?re-release of Intercord 26 499-4 Z/1-2, 1975)
- CM 040 Various Artists: The Third Irish Folk Festival 1992
- CM 041 Dick Gaughan: Call It Freedom 1988 also on CD CMCD 041
- CM 042 The Albion Band with Chris Baines: The Wild Side Of Town 1987 also on CD CMCD 042
- CM 043 Sean McGuire (as Sean Maguire): 60 Years Of Irish Fiddle Music 1988 (remastered 78s from the 1950s) (reissue of "Sean McGuire", EMI Ireland / Talisman STAL (1) 1016, 196?)
- CM 044 ??
- CM 045 Tom McConville: Straight From the Shoulder 1988
- CM 046 Davy Steele: Summerlee 1990
- CM 047 Rua: The Caves Of The Sun 1988
- CM 048 Sean McGuire (as Sean Maguire) Portraid 1990
- CM 049 ??
- CM 050 Vin Garbutt: When The Tide Turns 1989
- CM 051-053 ??
- CM 054 Liam O'Flynn: The Fine Art Of Piping 1991
- CM 055 Sherwood, Duncan & Swan: From The Heart 1990
- CM 056 Gordon Tyrrall: Not Far from Land 1990
- CMCD 057 De Dannan: 1/2 Set In Harlem 1991
- CMCD 058 Jean-Pierre Rasle: Cornemusiques 1993
- CMCD 059 ??
- CMCD 060 Phil & June Colclough: Players From A Drama 1991
- CMCD 061 ??
- CMCD 062 Various Artists: Maiden Voyage (Traditional Irish Music Session From Pepper's Bar, Feakle, Co. Clare) 1995?
- CMCD 063 Noreen Cullen & Adrian Burns: Bow Bridges 1991
- CMCD 064 Mary Custy & Eoin O'Neill: The Best Of Irish Music 1991
- CMCD 065 Mary Custy & Eoin O'Neill: The Ways of the World 1991
- CMCD 066 De Dannan: A Jacket of Batteries 199? (reissue of Harmac HM 48, 1988)
- CMCD 067 Afterhours: Hung Up And Dry 1992
- CMCD 068 ??
- CMCD 069 Afterhours: Up To Here 1994
- CMCD 070 Ian Campbell: And Another Thing 1993
- CMCD 071-072 ??
- CMCD 073 Wolfstone: Wolfstone II 1994
- CMCD 074 Wolfstone: Wolfstone 1994
- CMCD 075-076 ??
- CMCD 077 Micho Russell: Traditional Irish Music from County Clare 1997 (?reissue of Free Reed FRR 004, 1976)
- CMCD 078 Tich Frier: Man O' Independent Mind 1998
- CMCD 079 Josephine Keegan: Lifeswork: The Compositions of Josephine Keegan 2001 (double CD)
- CMCD 080 Mick Coyne: Both Sides of the Coyne 2004?
- CMCD 081 Tich Frier: You are Here (compilation) 2001
- CMCD 082-088 ??
- CMCD 089 Tich Frier: Shanghaied 2007

=== Singles ===
- CMS 100 Bernie Parry: "A To Z Of London" / "Green Peaceful Ocean" (7") 1981
- CMS 200 Tim Wood: "The Dole" / "Vulture" (7") 1982
- CMS 300 Dick Gaughan: "The Games People Play" / "A Different Kind Of Lovesong" (7") 1984
- CMS 400 Kieran Halpin: "Believing" / "Too Long Away" (7") 1984
- CMS 500 Shaun Davey / Rita Connolly: "Samson" / "Sailing To Armorica" (7") 1984
- CMS 600 ??
- CMS 700 Aiden Forde: "Dublin Ye're Breakin My Heart" / "Not To Worry" (7") 1988
- CMT 041 Dick Gaughan: "Call It Freedom" (12") 1987

=== Other ===
- CMBCD 001: The Furey's & Bob Stewart: Tomorrow We Part 2007 (reissue of Broadside BRO133 1976, also Crescent Records ARS 110 1979; credited to Bob Stewart & Finbar Furey on some releases)
- CMBCD 002: The High Level Ranters & Martyn Wyndham-Read: English Sporting Ballads (reissue of Broadside Records BRO 128, 1977)

== See also ==
- List of record labels
- List of independent UK record labels
