= Triakel (album) =

Studio album by Triakel
- Released: May 1998
- Recorded: January – March 1998
- Genre: Swedish folk
- Length: 42:55
- Label: Xource records
- Producer: Gustav Hylén

Triakel chronology
Triakel (1998)	Vintervisor (2000)

Triakel is the first album by the Swedish folk band of the same name, Triakel. It was released in 1998 on Xource records, a division of MNW Records Group AB.

== Reception ==
Professional ratings
Review scores
Source	Rating
AllMusic	4/5 stars

AllMusic's reviewer compared the band's performance to English folk artists like Shirley and Dolly Collins noting a mix of "gentleness and fury".

== Track listing ==
1. "Lilla Hin/Gammel Sara (Old Sara)" – 4:10
2. "I himmelen (In Paradise)" – 4:02
3. "I fjol (Last Year)" – 1:53
4. "Tusen tankar (A Thousand Thoughts)" – 6:43
5. "Mjölnarens måg (The Miller’s Son-in-law)" – 2:33
6. "Oväntad bröllopsgäst (The Unexpected Wedding-guest)" – 3:57
7. "Om dagen står du städs för mig (All Day Long You’re On My Mind)" – 2:52
8. "Alla gossar (All the Young Men)" – 3:12
9. "Födelsedagsfesten (The Birthday Party)" – 3:19
10. "Lapp-Nils polska" – 2:08
11. "Lejonbruden (The Lion and the Bride)" – 3:17
12. "En vacker vän (A Fair Young Love)" – 4:44

== Personnel ==
- Emma Härdelin - vocals
- Kjell-Erik Eriksson - fiddle
- Janne Strömstedt - harmonium
- Triakel - song arrangements
- Gustav Hylén - producer
- Bernhard Löhr - CD mastering
- Lennart Jonasson - photographs
- Pelle Anderson - graphics design
