= Critter Hill Varmints =

Scottish bluegrass band

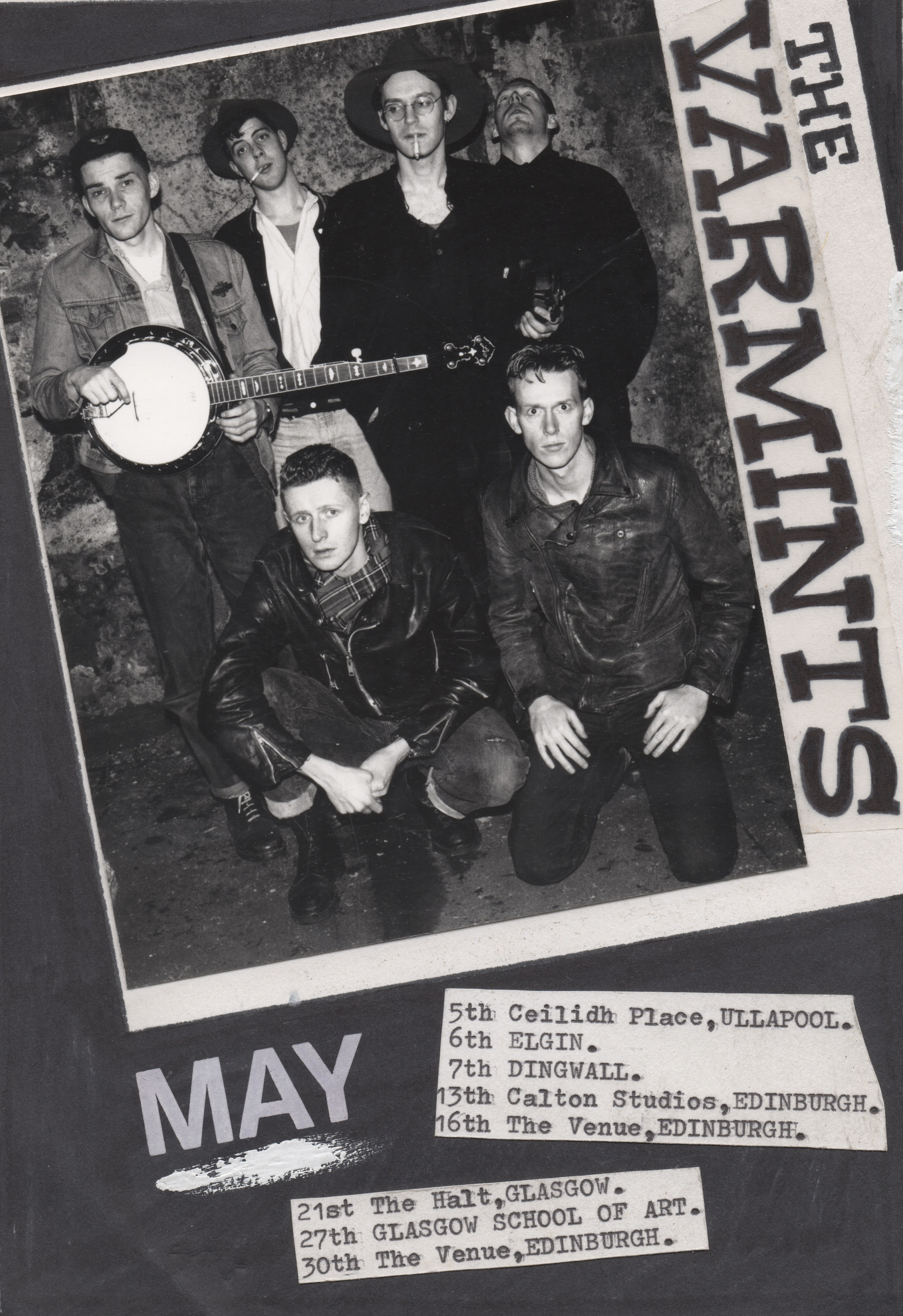
- In preparation for the Letter from America Tour, 1988

Background information
- Origin: Edinburgh, Scotland
- Genres: Indie folk, celtic rock, country folk, folk rock, post-punk
- Years active: 1986–1991
- Members: Micky Marr; Nick Schad; JJ Jamieson; Garry Mackenzie; James Lumsden; Craig Gaskin; Ben Ivitsky Molleson

The Critter Hill Varmints were a Scottish bluegrass band active from the mid-1980s until 1991.

== History ==
Critter Hill Varmints were formed in Edinburgh as part of a burgeoning and diverse music scene there in the 1980s, which included the likes of the short-lived bluegrass psychobilly contemporaries Swamptrash (many of who went on to form the 'Hypno-folkedelic Ambient Trad' band Shooglenifty), We Free Kings, the Dog Faced Hermans, HeeHaw, and more. They played both traditional and contemporary acoustic bluegrass and Appalachian-style tunes, initially busking in bars and on the streets of Edinburgh.

The line up included Micky Marr (guitar and vocals), Nick Schad (fiddle 1986 - 1988), JJ Jamieson (banjo), Garry Mackenzie (drums), James Lumsden (bass), Craig Gaskin (mandolin) and Ben Ivitsky Molleson (fiddle (1988 - 1991).

After seeing them perform, The Proclaimers invited the Varmints in 1988 to join them on a 12 date UK and Irish tour to promote their 1987 debut album This is the Story. The Varmints continued to play and tour extensively thereafter on the UK folk and festival circuit until their demise in late 1991.

The band recorded a number of sessions in Edinburgh and released these off label, including on cassette, Pump Up The Turkey, Ghost Train, and L'entente Cordiale, recorded at Chamber Studio, Pier House Studio and Sonic Studios respectively.

Their first TV appearance was on the Channel 4 arts programme 'Halfway to Paradise' in 1989.

Many of the band continued to play (Marr and Molleson with Kith and Kin, Jamieson with Bongshang). Schad's other band HeeHaw, by then demised, has since featured in film maker and author Grant McPhee's 'Scene Within A Scene: Scottish Independent Music 1992-2001' and on the Cherry Red Records 3 CD box set 'Something for the Longing' - "6/26" (Disc 2, Track 18).. Lumsden is now an internationally represented artist.

The Varmints appeared in historian and TV presenter David Olusoga's BBC Two 'A House Through Time' programme. It featured 20 Calton Hill, Edinburgh, the house where the band practiced in the 1980s.
