= String Sisters =

- Origin: Ireland, Norway, Sweden, United States, Scotland
- Genres: Folk, Irish traditional, Celtic
- Years active: 2005–present
- Labels: Grappa (Norway); Compass Records (USA)
- Members: Mairéad Ní Mhaonaigh; Annbjørg Lien; Liz Knowles; Catriona MacDonald; Liz Carroll; Emma Härdelin Inga Campbell

String Sisters (or The String Sisters) are a folk supergroup made up of six of the world's leading female fiddlers.

== History ==
=== Formation ===
In January 1998 at the world-renowned Celtic Connections festival in Glasgow, Scotland, Shetland fiddler Catriona MacDonald was commissioned to assemble the world's leading female fiddlers. Macdonald brought together friends and collaborators from Ireland, United States, Norway and Sweden to perform the festival's biggest concert of that year. Catriona arranged the concert set with fellow fiddle players Annbjørg Lien, Liz Knowles, Catriona MacDonald, Liz Carroll, Emma Härdelin and Mairéad Ní Mhaonaigh, who also provides vocals for the group.

=== Career ===
It was not until 2005 that the name String Sisters was penned. Until then, the group members could not be together at once due to their solo careers, Mairéad's work with Altan and Liz Carroll's work with John Doyle. Thus, only almost seven years after their début concert, the group commenced a Norwegian tour, recording their début album and DVD simply entitled Live.

In 2009, String Sisters were working on a new album, yet to be released. The band toured throughout 2009 and in 2010.

String Sisters performed on 25 August 2016 at the Tønder Festival in Tønder, Denmark, their first show as a band since 2010.

In 2018 they released Between Wind and Water, the band's second album and debut studio album. They are very popular in countries like Sweden and Norway as they are fond of folk music.

== Band members ==
=== "Sisters" ===
- Mairéad Ní Mhaonaigh — Irish fiddle, vocals (Ireland)
- Annbjørg Lien — Hardanger Fiddle (Norway)
- Liz Knowles — fiddle (USA)
- Catriona MacDonald — fiddle (Shetland, Scotland)
- Liz Carroll — fiddle (USA)
- Emma Härdelin — Fiddle, vocals (Sweden)
- Inga Campbell — Past Member/ Vocalist (India)

=== "Misters" ===
- David Milligan — piano (Scotland)
- Tore Bruvoll — guitar (Norway)
- Conrad Molleson — bass (Scotland)
- James Mackintosh — drums (Scotland)
- Gordon — Song (London)

== Discography ==
=== Albums ===
- 2007 — Live
- 2018 — Between Wind and Water (debut studio album)

=== DVDs ===
- 2007 — Live
- 2030
