= Daphne Godson =

Scottish international award winning violinist

Daphne Godson LRAM
- Birth name: Edith Muriel Daphne Godson
- Born: 16 March 1932 Portobello, Edinburgh
- Died: 15 August 2022 (aged 90) Edinburgh
- Instrument: violin
- Formerly of: Scottish Baroque Ensemble, Scottish Chamber Orchestra

Daphne Godson, LRAM (16 March 1932 - 15 August 2022) was an international award winning violinist and co-founder of the Scottish Baroque Ensemble.

== Life and musical career ==
Born Edith Muriel Daphne Godson in Edinburgh, at 7 Stanley Street, Portobello, she later lived in Bruntsfield. Both her parents were musical; her father worked in the civil service but was an amateur singer in church choirs and played violin and cello; her mother was a piano teacher and continued her own and Godson's musical education.

She was educated at girls' schools first at James Gillespie's Primary School and then George Watson's Ladies College, and Waddell School of Music, until 1949, when she spent a year completing her violin and piano exams. Godson won scholarships including a Royal Academy of London Dove Scholarship, becoming a Licentiate (LRAM) in 1950, then studying with Canadian violinist, Frederick Grinke, and with a Belgian government scholarship to Belgian Conservatoire, under André Gertler. At the age of 24, she won the 1957 first prize as an international violinist at the Contemporary Music Festival at Darmstadt, Germany, and an award at the Third Henryk Wieniawski Violin Competition.

At the age of 18, Godson was reviewed in March 1950 and she was described as having ‘besides her beautiful tone, a confidence and a maturity about her playing that was quite exceptional’. She performed on the BBC Home Service with pianist Kenneth Leighton in 1961, and was praised for her 'technical mastery, beauty of tone, and maturity of interpretation' of Hans Gál's concertino in Gateshead (1963). And was also a duet with pianist Audrey Innes given a very positive review in Musical Times (1962), saying that they 'deserve to be widely heard outside Scotland. Each couples a great sense of artistry with admirable technical accomplishment; each has an ardent musical personality that communicates enthusiasm and enjoyment to the listener’.

Sponsored by the Scottish Arts Council and Saltire Society in 1972, Godson and Leonard Friedman, with whom she had begun in the Scottish Baroque Ensemble, recorded for Scottish Records label, a range of 18th century music.

Godson recorded with Chandos Records, the Scottish Early Music Consort, songs and dances from Mary Queen of Scots' times. And in 1977 she performed with strings and pipes on Lismore Recordings with pipe major Robert Mathieson's Shotts and Dykehead Caledonia Pipe Band "The Big Birl. " She performed on the 1979 award winning tourist film 'Castle and Capital', now in the National Library of Scotland Moving Image archive.

She was the leader of the Scottish Chamber Orchestra (1974-76) and played solo with the BBC Scottish Symphony Orchestra, the Scottish National Orchestra and the Bournemouth Symphony Orchestra.

From 1959 to 1999, Godson performed concerts at the University of Edinburgh Reid Concert Hall, with the Reid Orchestra and others, for example, in 1984 with the Stodart Fortepiano Ensemble.

Between 1970 and 1995, she was also soloist with the Scottish Sinfonia.
