= Catriona MacDonald =

Fiddle player from Shetland

Catriona Macdonald
- Born: 1969 or 1970 (age 55–56)
- Genres: Folk music Celtic; Scottish music
- Occupations: Musician, music teacher, academic
- Instrument: Fiddle
- Years active: 1983–present
- Label: Peerie Angel
- Members: David Milligan (piano); Conrad Ivitsky (double bass); James Mackintosh (drums, percussion)
- Website: Official website

Catriona Macdonald (born 1968) is a fiddler, composer, researcher, and lecturer from Shetland, located some 320 km (200 miles) north of the Scottish mainland. She is considered to be among the world's leading traditional fiddle players, and one of the top exponents of the Shetland fiddle, a branch of traditional music with clear connections to the music of Scotland, but which features differs slightly in its overall feeling. The music of Shetland has been shaped for centuries by visitors and various musicians from abroad, including Scandinavians, and has been influenced by styles such as the music of Orkney, Norway and Ireland.

== Background ==
Macdonald began studying traditional fiddle with Dr. Tom Anderson MBE in 1981, then aged 11 (she considers herself to be a "late" starter); she became a founding member of Shetland's Young Heritage Fiddlers, being awarded as Shetland Young Fiddler of the Year in 1983, two years after starting. In 1992, she won the BBC Radio 2 Young Folk Award, and went on to study voice for four years at the Royal College of Music, London.

Macdonald lives in Scotland, dividing her time between her music career as well as more academic and scholarly pursuits, as she is a teacher who shares her knowledge of traditional fiddle techniques and vernacular.

Professionally, she is chair of Undergraduate Board of Studies and Degree Program Director for the BA in Folk and Traditional Music, Newcastle University, as well as a Doctoral candidate. Macdonald has worked as a tutor and course assessor for the Scottish Music Degree at the Royal Conservatoire of Scotland, Glasgow, and has taught and lectured at universities across Norway, Ireland (including the University of Limerick), Denmark, Canada and Australia, as well as in Stirling and Highlands and Islands, Scotland. She also regularly tutors at a variety of annual summer schools, festivals and residential courses, including Cambridge, England's Burwell Bash, Shetland's Shetland Fiddle Frenzy, "Folkworks" and "Blazin' in Beauly" (the band Blazin' Fiddles' own summer school).

Macdonald also tours and performs at global music festivals, such as Cape Breton Island's Celtic Colours Festival, Finland's Kaustinen Folk Music Festival and Scotland's Celtic Connections. As well as her own concerts, Macdonald has performed and recorded with an all-female, international fiddle ensemble called the String Sisters, a sextet composed of her and Norwegian Hardanger fiddle player Annbjørg Lien, Liz Knowles (Irish American fiddler, and past member of Cherish the Ladies), Liz Carroll (Irish American fiddler and composer from Chicago), Emma Härdelin (fiddler and vocalist of the Swedish folk-rock band Garmarna), and Mairéad Ní Mhaonaigh of Gweedore, Ireland (singer, fiddler, and founding member of Donegal traditional "supergroup" Altan). She has also toured as a duo with Annbjørg Lien, and also Timo Alakotila, often showcasing the similarities and nuances common between the Nordic and Shetland styles. She has been a member of The Unusual Suspects, and was a member of Scottish fiddle band Blazin' Fiddles until 2011.

== Discography ==
=== Solo albums ===
- 2000 — Bold
- 2007 — Over the Moon

=== Groups and collaborations ===
- 1994 Opus Blue (with Ian Lowthian)
- 1998 Hodden Grey Ian Bruce
- 2001 A Shot at Glory soundtrack (with Mark Knopfler)
- 2004 The Old Style (Blazin Fiddles)
- 2005 Magnificent Seven (Blazin Fiddles)
- 2005 Live in Scotland The Unusual Suspects
- 2006 Strange But True Kathryn Tickell
- 2007 Blazin' Fiddles Live (Blazin Fiddles)
- 2007 Live - String Sisters
- 2008 Stramash Colin Steele
- 2010 Big Like This The Unusual Suspects
- 2011 Thursday Night in the Caley (Blazin Fiddles)
- 2013 Vamm (Vamm - Patsy Reid, Catriona Macdonald and Marit Fält)
- 2017. Between Wind and Water (String Sisters)

=== Awards ===
- 1991 BBC Radio 2 Young Tradition Award for Best Musician in Britain
- Polls 2001 "Top 5 World Music Albums of the Year" fRoots Magazine 2001
- "Top 10 Folk Albums of the Year 2000"
- MOJO Magazine 2001 (Folk Album of the Month, April 2000)
- MOJO Magazine 2001 Recognised artist "Album of the Year and Musician of the Year"
- BBC2 Folk Awards 2001 (included in the released compilation CD The Folk Awards on Topic records)
- "Scottish Folk Album of the Year" CD NOW

==== Scottish Traditional Music Awards ====
- 2004 Live Band (Blazin Fiddles)
- 2005 Album of the Year (Blazin Fiddles)
