= The Hurricane Jungle =

Studio album by Bongshang
- Released: 13 December 1996
- Recorded: Lerwick & Scalloway, Shetland
- Label: Doovf
- Producer: Bongshang

Bongshang chronology
Crude (1993)	The Hurricane Jungle (1996)	Vy-lo-fone (1999)

Professional ratings
Review scores
Source	Rating
Folk Roots	(favourable)

The Hurricane Jungle is the second studio album from Shetland based band Bongshang.

== Track listing ==
1. "D/Drone" - 4:34
2. "All That Hate" - 3:21
3. "Probleme" - 2:48
4. "Tackhead" - 4:18
5. "Dubweiser" - 7:08
6. "Tangled Flies" - 6:02
7. "Abandon Motion" - 5:30
8. "The Honeyshroud" - 6:27
9. "Hurricane Jungle" - 7:18

== Personnel ==
- JJ Jamieson - banjo, vocals, keyboards, samples
- Bryan Peterson - bass guitar, double bass, harmonica, keyboards
- Neil Preshaw - guitar, vocals, keyboards, samples, percussion
- Peter Gear - fiddle
- Christopher 'Kipper' Anderson - drums, percussion, drum programming

=== Guest personnel ===
- Joanna Redmond - Vocals

== Production notes ==
- The Hurricane Jungle was recorded in "Late Night Radio Music Studios" in Scalloway (Neil Preshaw's studio), "Super Session 8 Studios" in Lerwick (JJ Jamieson's studio) and "The Love Garage" in Lerwick (Bryan Peterson's studio). The album was mixed in The Love Garage in late 1996.
