= Leader Records (UK) =

British record label specialized in traditional folk music

Leader Records was a British folk music record label, started by Bill Leader. Between 1969 and 1978, Leader released many important releases of both traditional and folk revival performers, the latter category including Nic Jones, Martin Simpson and Dick Gaughan. Among the field recordings released on the label, often with gatefold sleeves and extensive notes, were 'The Border Minstrel' by Billy Pigg, and 'Unto Brigg Fair' which featured cylinder recordings from the early 1900s made by Percy Grainger of Joseph Taylor and other traditional Lincolnshire singers. The 4 LP boxed set 'A Song for Every Season' by the Copper Family was also recorded by Bill Leader and released on his label.

In the 1990s the Leader catalogue was sold to another record company "Highway" which later went into receivership. It was subsequently sold to the Celtic Music record label.

== See also ==
- Lists of record labels
