= The Last Castaways =

2003 children's book by Harry Horse

- Author: Harry Horse
- Language: English
- Genre: Children's
- Publisher: Puffin Books
- Publication date: 3 April 2003
- Publication place: United Kingdom
- Pages: 96 pp
- ISBN: 978-0-14-131461-7
- OCLC: 56888097

The Last Castaways is a 2003 children's book in The Last... series by Harry Horse. It won the Nestlé Smarties Book Prize Silver Award. It is a humorous adventure tale told through a series of letters from Grandfather to his grandchild, a ship's log and a diary.

== Plot summary ==
Grandfather and his dog Roo accidentally win their old ship, the Unsinkable, in an auction and go on a fishing trip. However, the ship sinks and they are cast away on a desert isle. They find some treasure and rescue their ship.
