= Martin Suckling =

British composer (born 1981)

- Born: 1981; United Kingdom
- Genres: Classical
- Occupation(s): Musician, Composer, Violinist
- Years active: 2005–present
- Website: http://www.martinsuckling.com/

Martin Suckling (born 23 November 1981) is a British composer. He is also a violinist and teacher.

== Education ==
Suckling was born in Glasgow and attended Bearsden Academy. He read music at Clare College, Cambridge and went on to study composition with George Benjamin at King's College London. He was a Paul Mellon Fellow at Yale University, where he studied with Ezra Laderman and Martin Bresnick in the Yale School of Music. On returning to the UK he undertook doctoral research at the Royal Academy of Music, supervised by Simon Bainbridge.

== Career ==
While still a student, Suckling received commissions from the Deutsches Symphonie-Orchester Berlin (Play, 2005) and the London Symphony Orchestra (The Moon, the Moon!, 2007). He won the Royal Philharmonic Society Composition Prize in 2008, leading to a commission from the Wigmore Hall for the Aronowitz Ensemble (To See the Dark Between, 2010). In 2011, the London Sinfonietta commission and premiere of Candlebird, a song cycle to texts by Don Paterson, led to critical acclaim. Subsequent commissions have come from ensembles such as the London Contemporary Orchestra, BBC Scottish Symphony Orchestra, Scottish Ensemble and the Scottish Chamber Orchestra, with whom Suckling was appointed Associate Composer in 2014.

Previously Stipendiary Lecturer in Music at Somerville College, Oxford, since 2012 Suckling has been a lecturer in the Music Department at the University of York, where he teaches courses in Composition, Orchestration, and Spectral Music.

Suckling's music often explores aspects of microtonality, and he has acknowledged his debt in this regard to composers associated with spectral music. Other influences include Scottish folk music – Suckling was a fiddle player in several cèilidh bands in his teens – and literature, especially poetry.

In addition to music for the concert hall, Suckling has also composed music designed to be encountered online: these bones, this flesh, this skin, which received a Classical:NEXT Innovation Award in 2021, and the 'game-for-music' Black Fell, an opera / videogame hybrid.

== Key works ==
- The Moon, the Moon! (2007; symphony orchestra)
- To See the Dark Between (2010; string sextet and piano)
- Lieder ohne Worte (2010; piano solo)
- Candlebird (2011; baritone and large ensemble)
- de sol y grana (2011; violin and ensemble)
- storm, rose, tiger (2011; chamber orchestra)
- Postcards (2012–13; string ensemble)
- Release (2013; symphony orchestra)
- Nocturne (2013; violin and cello)
- Six Speechless Songs (2013; chamber orchestra)
- Songs from a Bright September (2014; baritone and piano trio)
- Visiones (after Goya) (2015; clarinet, cello, piano)
- Psalm (after Celan) (2015; harp and three groups of four instruments)
- Piano Concerto (2014–16; piano and chamber orchestra)
- The White Road (after Edmund de Waal) (2016; flute and symphony orchestra)
- Emily's Electrical Absence (2017; string quintet)
- Meditation (after Donne) (2018; chamber orchestra and live electronics)
- This Departing Landscape (2019; symphony orchestra)
- The Tuning (2019; mezzo-soprano and piano, texts by Michael Donaghy)
- Her Lullaby (2019; solo viola (or violin or cello))
- these bones this flesh this skin (2020; multimedia, violin and dancer)
- Òran Fìdhle (Violin Song) (2021; violin duo)
- The Wolf, the Duck and the Mouse (2022; narrator and orchestra)
- Black Fell (2023; multimedia: game-for-music, soprano and violin)

== Discography ==
- Candlebird – London Sinfonietta, Leigh Melrose, Nicholas Collon, SINF CD1-2012
- Fanfare for a Newborn Child – London Symphony Orchestra, François Xavier Roth, LSO Live LSO5061
- This Departing Landscape; Release; Piano Concerto; The White Road for flute & orchestra - BBC Philharmonic, BBC Scottish Symphony Orchestra, Katherine Bryan (flute), Tamara Stefanovich (piano), Ilan Volkov (conductor). NMC Recordings, NMC D262
- The Tuning – Marta Fontanals Simmons, Chris Glynn, members of Aurora Orchestra. Delphian Records, DCD34235CD
- The Moon, the Moon! – London Symphony Orchestra, François Xavier Roth, LSO Live LSO5032
- To See the Dark Between – Aronowitz Ensemble, Sonimage SON 11202
- Visiones (after Goya) - 'From Score to Sound', Dark Inventions CD 1702
