= Swamptrash =

Scottish band

Swamptrash were a Scottish bluegrass/psychobilly band formed in 1987 in Edinburgh. They split in 1989 and several of the members went on to form Shooglenifty. The band has been recognised as crucial to the development of experimental Scottish acoustic music.

they really were a ramshackle and thoroughly enjoyable faux-punk string/bluegrass band who attacked new and old tunes with the verve and self-evident pleasure others heard in the Pogues

— Grant Alden, 27 March 2007

== Personnel ==
Members have included:

- Harry Horse - vocals, banjo (later played in Hexology and worked as a children's author, political illustrator/cartoonist for The Scotsman and The Herald newspapers, and developer of the video game Drowned God)
- Neil McArthur - fiddle
- James MacIntosh - drums (later played in Capercaillie and with Michael McGoldrick, now in Shooglenifty)
- Garry "Banjo" Finlayson - banjo (later in Shooglenifty)
- Malcolm Crosbie - guitar (currently in Shooglenifty)
- Nick Prescott - mandolin
- Conrad Molleson - bass (later played with Catriona MacDonald and in Shooglenifty)
- Angus R. Grant - fiddle (later in Shooglenifty, died 2016)

== Discography ==
- It Makes No Never Mind - DDT Records (1987 album)
- Bone (6 track EP recorded as a session for Janice Long on BBC Radio 1)
