= Heritage Fiddlers =

Heritage Fiddlers (or Shetland's Heritage Fiddlers) is a group of Shetland fiddle players, originally formed in 1981 under the guidance of the late Dr Tom Anderson MBE, who put the group together from the young pupils that he tutored. The group was originally called Tammy's Peerie Angels, then Shetland's Young Heritage. The group is now called Heritage Fiddlers as the members felt they "couldna git awa wi da young bit onymare so wir noo kent as Shetland's Heritage Fiddlers."

Prominent Shetland born fiddler Catriona MacDonald is an ex-member.

== Discography ==
- Visions – Released 1993 – Catalogue No: SYHCD001
- Bridging The Gap – Released 1997 – Catalogue No: SYHCD002
