= Leonard Scollay =

Scottish fiddler (1873–2014)

- Born: John Leonard Scollay; 8 May 1973
- Died: 25 March 2014 (aged 40); Shetland Islands
- Occupation: Fiddle player
- Known for: Founding member of Bongshang and Rock Salt & Nails

(John) Leonard Scollay (8 May 1973 – 25 March 2014) was a fiddle player from the Shetland Islands.

== Musical career ==
Scollay was a founding member of Shetland bands Bongshang and Rock Salt & Nails, was a former Shetland Young Fiddler of the Year and a BBC Young Tradition Award finalist. He was described by BBC Radio Scotland DJ Tom Morton as "one of the best fiddle players I've ever heard".

== Accidental death ==
Scollay died in a fishing accident in the early hours of Tuesday 25 March 2014 when the fishing boat he was crewing hit rocks and sank off Shetland.
