= Liz Carroll =

American fiddler and composer

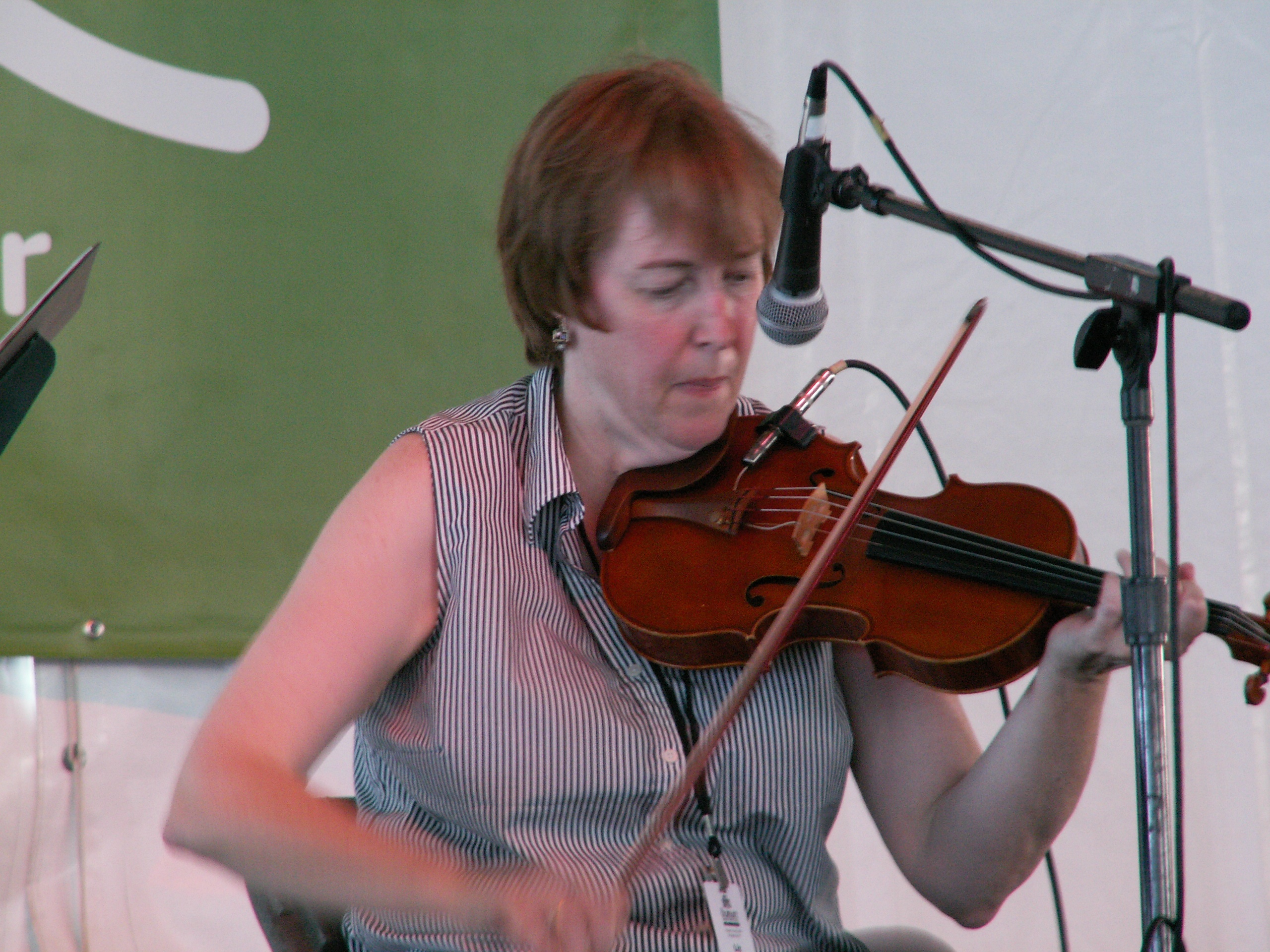
- Carroll at the Dublin (Ohio) Irish Festival, August 2011

Background information
- Born: September 19, 1956 (age 70); Chicago, Illinois, U.S.
- Genres: Folk music Celtic; Irish traditional
- Occupations: Musician, music teacher
- Instrument: Fiddle
- Years active: 1974 – Present
- Labels: Compass; Shanachie; Flying Fish; Green Linnet
- Website: Official website

Liz Carroll (born September 19, 1956) is an American fiddler and composer. She is a recipient of the National Endowment for the Arts' National Heritage Fellowship Award. Carroll and collaborator Irish guitarist John Doyle were nominated for a Grammy Award in 2010. She is considered one of the greatest contemporary Irish fiddlers.

== Early life and education ==
Carroll's parents were born in Ireland; her father Kevin was from Brocca, County Offaly, and her mother Eileen was from Ballyhahill, County Limerick. Her maternal grandfather played the violin and her father played button accordion. Carroll was born September 19, 1956, in Chicago, Illinois and raised on Chicago's south side. She took classical music lessons from nuns at Visitation Catholic School. On Sunday nights, Carroll and her family visited a south side Irish pub that hosted a live radio show featuring traditional Irish music. She earned a degree in social psychology at DePaul University. Carroll's influences include Chicago-born Irish fiddler John McGreevy, Irish button accordionist Joe Cooley, Irish fiddler Sean McGuire, 1983 National Heritage Award-winning uilleann piper Joe Shannon, and pianist Eleanor Neary.

== Competition achievement ==
Carroll won second place in the All-Ireland under 18 fiddle championship at the 1973 Fleadh Cheoil, the Irish music competition run by Comhaltas Ceoltóirí Éireann; Frankie Gavin won first. Carroll returned the following year and won first place in the category. In the succeeding year, 1975, at age 18, she won the All-Ireland Senior Fiddle Championship, at the time only the second American to have done so. That same year Carroll and Chicago piano accordionist Jimmy Keane won the senior duet championship. The championships brought recognition of Carroll as one of the most outstanding Irish fiddlers of all time.

== Recordings and performances ==
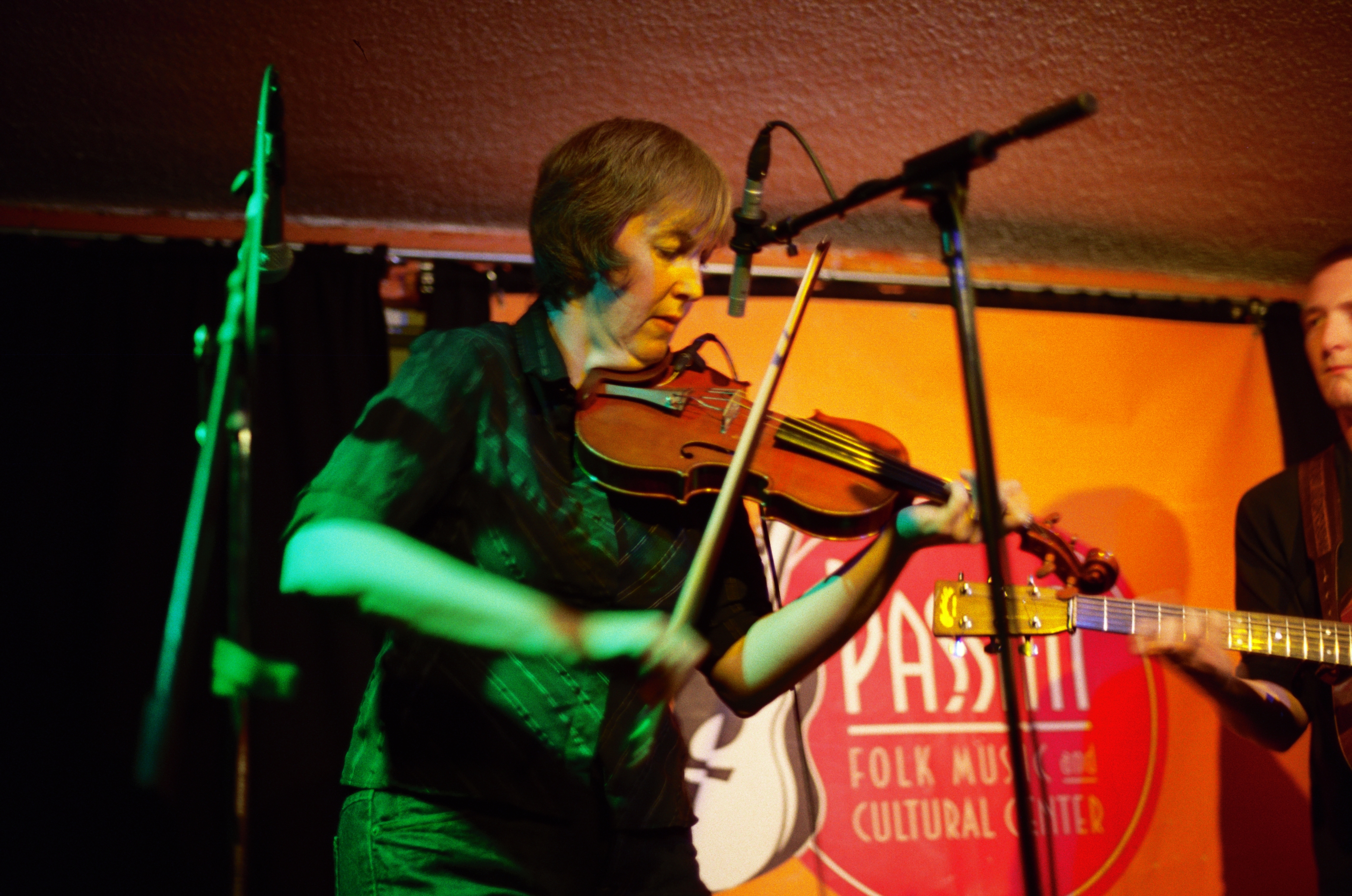
Carroll and John Doyle at Club Passim in Cambridge, Massachusetts on June 21, 2007

In 1977, Carroll and button accordionist Tommy Maguire released the album Kiss Me Kate. The following year, Carroll recorded her first solo album A Friend Indeed, accompanied on piano by Marty Fahey, featuring five of her compositions.

In the early 1980s, Carroll toured with Green Fields of America, the Irish traditional music ensemble led by Irish musician and folklorist Mick Moloney. In 1987 she was asked to join the debut tour of the all-female Irish American ensemble Cherish the Ladies, but declined for family reasons.

Carroll's second, eponymous solo album was released in 1988, and featured accompaniment by Irish guitarist Dáithí Sproule. In 1992, Carroll, Sproule, and Irish-American button accordionist Billy McComiskey formed Trian and recorded two albums.

In 2000 she performed with Don Henley of the Eagles in his encore, which included an Irish song, for fourteen U.S. concert dates.

Lost in the Loop (2000), Carroll's first solo album in over a decade, featured thirteen original compositions and was produced by Séamus Egan of Solas. Irish traditional music critic Earle Hitchner of MTV wrote of the track The Silver Spear/The Earl's Chair/The Musical Priest:

Carroll's febrile bowing is breathtaking, a model of rolls and triplets executed in fleet, articulate clusters. She sounds almost possessed, yet not once does she lose sight of those traditional reels' melodies in one of the more exhilarating Irish fiddle tracks ever recorded.

In the 2000s, Carroll recorded three albums accompanied by Irish guitarist John Doyle, entitled Lake Effect, In Play and Double Play. A 2005 Carroll and Doyle concert at the John F. Kennedy Center for the Performing Arts in Washington, D.C., and an interview was collected by the American Folklife Center at the Library of Congress. On Saint Patrick's Day 2009 Carroll and Doyle played at the White House for President Barack Obama. The Scotsman, a compact newspaper in Edinburgh, remarked on a 2011 Carroll and Doyle performance in the Glasgow Royal Concert Hall:

... Carroll's full-grained, sweet yet sinewy tone and richly lyrical phrasing subtly underscored by Doyle's less-is-more finesse ... Her exceptional playing was distinguished by its muscular, supple lift and swing, immaculately applied ornamentation and fiery attack ...

Carroll is one of the String Sisters and performs on their live album and DVD titled Live which was recorded in 2005 and released in 2007.

== Composer ==
Carroll composed her first reel at age nine, and had composed one hundred and seventy tunes by 2000. In August 2010, two hundred of her compositions, recorded and unrecorded, were published as Collected: Original Irish Tunes. The Irish Echo, a weekly newspaper based in New York City, named Collected the best collection of tunes in 2010.

Carroll is "recognized as a gifted composer of tunes in the Irish idiom," according to the Irish Echo. Her compositions are in the performance and recorded repertoires of other musicians. "Many of her tunes have become modern standards," according to The Scotsman. Carroll "has composed more than a dozen tunes that have become beloved standards among her peers," according to the San Diego Union-Tribune.

She composed the music for The Mai, a play by Irish playwright Marina Carr that opened at the Irish Repertory Theatre in New York in 1994. In 2001 Carroll collaborated with Irish-American author Frank McCourt on staged readings from his works, a production developed by the Steppenwolf Theater Company in Chicago. Her compositions have been choreographed by Irish dance companies including the Dennehy School of Irish Dancing and Trinity Irish Dance.

== Honors ==
In 1994, Carroll received a National Heritage Fellowship, a lifetime honor presented to master folk and traditional artists by the National Endowment for the Arts.

At Chicago's Celtic Fest, Chicago Mayor Richard M. Daley declared September 18, 1999, Liz Carroll Day in Chicago.

The Irish Echo named her traditional musician of the year in 2000, saying: "Carroll has enriched and extended the Irish tradition in music through performing, composing, and teaching."

In 2010, Double Play, Carroll's recording with John Doyle on Compass Records was nominated for the Grammy Award for Best Traditional World Music Album, making Carroll the first American-born traditional Irish musician to be nominated for a Grammy. In 2011, she was the recipient of the Gradam Ceoil TG4 Cumadóir award, Ireland's most significant traditional music prize for composition. She was the first American-born composer honored with the award. In 2015 Carroll said the 2011 composer's award and the 2010 Grammy nomination were the honors of which she was most proud.

== Discography ==
- 1978 – Kiss Me Kate (with Tommy Maguire and Jerry Wallace) (Shanachie Records)
- 1979 – A Friend Indeed (with Marty Fahey) (solo album no. 1 - reissued 1995) (Shanachie Records)
- 1986 – There Were Roses (with Mick Moloney, Robbie O’Connell, and Jimmy Keane) (Green Linnet Records)
- 1988 – Liz Carroll (solo album no. 2 - reissued 1993) (Green Linnet Records)
- 1992 – Trian (with Trian) (Flying Fish Records)
- 1995 – Trian II (with Trian) (Green Linnet Records)
- 2000 – Lost in The Loop (solo album no. 3) (Green Linnet Records)
- 2002 – Lake Effect (solo album no. 4) (Green Linnet Records)
- 2005 – In Play (with John Doyle) (Compass Records)
- 2007 – Live (with String Sisters) (Compass Records)
- 2009 – Double Play (with John Doyle) (Compass Records) (Grammy nominee)
- 2013 – On the Offbeat (solo album no. 5) (self-released)
- 2015 – Ireland, Crossroads of Art and Design, 1690-1840: The Music (co-produced with Liz Knowles) (The Art Institute of Chicago, for the exhibition of the same name)
- 2018 – Between Wind and Water (with String Sisters) (self released)
- 2019 – Half Day Road (with Jake Charron)

== Published works ==
- Carroll, Liz (2010). Collected: Original Irish Tunes. ISBN 978-0-615-37814-5.
