= Fiddlers' Bid =

Scottish instrumental group

- Origin: Shetland, Scotland
- Genres: Folk, Scottish music
- Years active: 1991–present
- Labels: Greentrax, Hairst Blinks Music
- Members: Andrew Gifford - Fiddle, Kevin Henderson - Fiddle, Maurice Henderson - Fiddle, Chris Stout - Fiddle, Catriona McKay - Clàrsach, Piano, Jonathan Ritch - Bass, Fionán de Barra - Guitar
- Past members: Michael Ferrie - Fiddle, Davie Keith - Piano, Steve Yarrington - Guitar, Dave Coles - Bass
- Website: Fiddlers Bid

Fiddlers' Bid are a Shetland based instrumental group known for playing contemporary arrangements of traditional Shetland fiddle tunes. The seven piece line-up consists of four fiddles, acoustic guitar, bass guitar and piano/Clàrsach.

The band have performed at some of the largest folk festivals in the world including the Smithsonian Folklife Festival, Cambridge Folk Festival, Festival Interceltique de Lorient and Celtic Connections, and have toured extensively including performances at Melbourne Concert Hall and Sydney Opera House.

Several members of the band play Ewen Thomson violins.

== Discography ==
- Around The World, Fiddlers' Bid Recordings (1994)
- Hamnataing, Greentrax (1998)
- Da Farder Ben Da Welcomer, Greentrax (2001)
- Naked and Bare, Greentrax (2005)
- All Dressed in Yellow, Hairst Blinks Music (2009)

== Awards and achievements ==
- Band members Chris Stout and Andrew Gifford have both won the Shetland Young Fiddler of the Year competition
- Festival Interceltique de Lorient, France, Winners of "La Trophe La Bolee de Corrigans" (1994)
- Scottish Folk Awards "Best Live Act" (2003)
- Australian Entertainment Industry Association's Helpmann Awards nomination "Best Contemporary Music Concert Presentation" (2003)
- Band member Catriona McKay won "Instrumentalist of the Year" in the Scots Trad Music Awards (2007,2014)
- Scots Trad Music Awards nomination "Best Live Act" (2005)
- Scots Trad Music Awards nomination "Scottish Folk Band of the Year" (2007)
- Scots Trad Music Awards winner "Album of the Year" for All Dressed in Yellow (2009)
