= Drowned God =

1996 science fiction adventure game

Drowned God: Conspiracy of the Ages
- Cover art
- Developer: Epic Multimedia Group
- Publisher: Inscape
- Designer: Harry Horse
- Platform: Windows 95
- Release: October 31, 1996
- Genre: Adventure
- Mode: Single-player

Drowned God: Conspiracy of the Ages is a 1996 adventure game developed by Epic Multimedia Group and published by Inscape. The game propounds the conspiracy theory that all of human history is a lie and that the human race's development and evolution were aided by extraterrestrials. The player attempts to uncover the truth through the course of the game by traveling to a variety of different worlds, interacting with historical and fictional characters, and solving puzzles.

Drowned God is based on a forged manuscript written by Harry Horse in 1983, purported to have been written by 19th-century poet Richard Henry Horne, who shares Horse's birth name. After facing legal trouble and fines when he attempted to sell the text, Horse shelved it until playing Myst and The 7th Guest in the mid-1990s, whereupon he decided a first-person adventure game would be the best way to tell the manuscript's story.

Producer Algy Williams hired a team of multimedia artists and programmers to help Horse develop Drowned God. Upon its release, the game sold well, but it quickly faded in popularity due to bugs and a lack of patches. Drowned God's concept and visuals were widely praised, while its gameplay, audio, and puzzles received more varied responses. A planned sequel never came to fruition. The game was re-released on the Epic Games Store in 2024 by the original team along with Next Path Media.

== Plot ==
=== Background ===
Drowned God's concept centers around the idea that human history has been manipulated to cover up certain facts. The true history, according to the game, is that aliens from the Orion area of space seeded humanity on Earth thousands of years ago and have since guided its development. An ancient, highly developed civilization was lost millennia ago in the Great Flood. The library of Alexandria housed much of what game writer Harry Horse called "forbidden knowledge" before it was destroyed; the Knights Templar, whose membership included luminaries such as Leonardo da Vinci and Isaac Newton, preserved the information for centuries. In the 20th century, the Philadelphia Experiment opened a gateway into another dimension, first freeing the aliens Horse refers to as "the Legion", and an independent government group spent the subsequent decades in contact with the aliens following the Roswell incident.

=== Story ===
The game's plot begins in a chamber containing the Bequest Globe, a device which the player has recently inherited. The Globe is a giant brass cylinder full of gears, fronted by a clock face made of sliding and rotating plates comprising twenty-two Roman numerals, which represent the Major Arcana, with the Kabbalistic tree of life in its center. A voice welcomes the player and tells them the Globe is a gift, then explains that the player must unlock the secret of the drowned god.

The player initially must enter their name into the device, which then displays a series of past lives the player has lived. The name is converted into its numerological equivalent. Above and below the central chamber are two other areas, called Kether and Malchut respectively, each of which houses a display screen with a mask-like face that provides the player with information about the next task. The motivations of the two organizations represented by the faces are murky, although it becomes clear they are acting in opposition to each other. Both masks refer to the player by their assigned number.

The player must enter four different worlds through the Bequest Globe, each of which is an amalgamation of historical and fantastical elements and is named after one of the sefirot on the Kabbalistic Tree of Life. The player seeks to recover four lost artifacts: the Rod of Osiris, the Holy Grail, the Philosopher's stone, and the Ark of the Covenant. According to Horse, "The relics you're searching for are not what you think they are". The first world, Binah, includes aspects of Arthurian legend, including Morgan le Fay and the Knights Templar, as well as Stonehenge. The second, Chesed, features Mesoamerican ruins and a submarine interior. The third, Din, centers around an underground transit system, a steampunk carnival, and a mechanical maze. The final world, Chokhmah, takes place outside Area 51.

Throughout the game, the player finds and uses Tarot cards to unlock new areas and gain more information about the true history of the world. Upon returning to the Bequest Globe between worlds, the player sees the Roman numerals in its display light up in relation to the cards that have been recovered. After recovering three of the lost artifacts, the player fails to recover the last one, the Ark of the Covenant, which takes the form of a nuclear warhead. The player is able to choose one of three endings, depending on whether they decide to enter a final doorway in the chambers of one of the two opposing factions represented by Kether and Malchut, or enter a new central chamber via the Bequest Globe.

Choosing either of the two doors results in an ending in which the player is trapped in a dystopian world: either Kether's, a technological police state, or Malchut's, a society of forced genetic manipulation. Both have ominous men in black overseeing the proceedings. If the player instead chooses to open the central chamber, a scene with a group of grey aliens approaching is briefly shown, wherein they say, "We are coming, for we are Legion." All three options lead to the same ending credits, which feature a voice-over describing the murder of Osiris.

== Gameplay ==
The Albert Einstein and Isaac Newton dialogue puzzle, described as "brilliant" by critics

Drowned God uses a point and click interface and a first-person perspective typical of games similar to Myst of the mid- to late-1990s. The player navigates and interacts with the game world by clicking the mouse on different parts of the screen. The mouse cursor changes shape depending on the action clicking will perform: an arrow for moving to another location, a face with an arrow to pick up or place Tarot cards, and an Eye of Providence for activating or interacting with objects in the environment. Frequent cutscenes provide background information and advance the storyline.

The game is filled with a variety of puzzles that must be solved to advance the story. These include memory games and mazes. Others involve competing against a computer-controlled opponent, completing a sequence in a limited number of moves, operating mechanisms, or using an inventory item. Puzzles do not all have to be completed in a precise order; there is some flexibility in terms of being able to move through game areas and work on different challenges.

One of the best-received puzzles in the game involves arranging the pieces of a dialogue between the sculpted heads of Isaac Newton and Albert Einstein. The player listens to the randomly ordered statements made by each head, then decides how to chronologically arrange the statements to form a coherent conversation based on context.

== Development ==
Harry Horse conceived the game's ancient planet-wide conspiracy. Horse had previously written several children's books and received the Scottish Arts Council Writer of the Year award for his 1983 book The Ogopogo: My Journey with the Loch Ness Monster. He began forging documents that same year as a way to earn money. The story which became the basis for Drowned God was originally a phony manuscript Horse wrote in 1983, ostensibly describing events after the destruction of the lost city of Atlantis. The manuscript, dated 1846, was said to have been written by the English poet Richard Horne, who shares Horse's birth name. Horse's initiation into the concept of an alternate history came in the early 1980s, when he first encountered professor Ian Halpke, who explained to him that information from the Kabbalah and ancient Jewish texts "hide and encipher the secret", namely, human evolution was aided by extraterrestrial intelligence. According to Horse, Halpke believed the Ark of the Covenant was a nuclear device, and that humans and pigs share compatible genes.

Initially, experts determined the manuscript was genuine, as the date Horse picked matched the time period Horne had been alive and active, and the manuscript's topics matched the poet's interests. Horse had written the manuscript without knowing any of these details. After his hoax was discovered, Horse held on to the text for the next decade, until he played Myst and The 7th Guest and decided the point-and-click adventure genre was a good match for his conspiracy theory-inspired ideas. He later said that while the story of Myst did not interest him, the game's artwork and the sense of immersion inspired him to immediately begin working on Drowned God in 1994.

The game was originally commissioned by a division of Time Warner and was later taken over by Inscape when that division closed. Horse worked with Inigo Orduna and Anthony McGaw for six months designing the game, then cooperated with the game's artists and modelers until the project's completion. The game's producer, Algy Williams, hired puzzle expert Chris Maslanka, whose output he called "fiendishly difficult", to design the game's puzzles together with John Morris. Williams also employed sculptor Greg Boulton, who had previously worked on the Peter Gabriel video "Sledgehammer". Drowned God's music was written and performed by an ambient music duo operating under the name Miasma. William S. Burroughs was originally scheduled to narrate the game, but died just before he could begin recording. McGaw and Williams later founded the company Babel Media, which specializes in video game localization.

== Release ==
Drowned God was released on October 31, 1996 for the Windows 95 operating system. Around the same time, there was going to be a release for Windows 3.1x; however, those plans were cancelled. In its first two weeks, it sold 34,000 copies in the United States. It was one of the top ten best-selling video games in United States during the first month after its release, but bugs and poor support from the developers caused it to fall out of favor with gamers by December. By February 1998, the game had sold over 60,000 copies. Around the time of the game's release, Horse stated that its story was incomplete, and that the rest of the story would be revealed in a sequel called CULT, planned to center around Area 51. However, he died a decade after the game's release, and no sequel was ever completed.

The game was re-released for modern Windows PCs on the Epic Games Store on June 17, 2024 by Next Path Media. The new version of the game was assembled via a collaboration between Horse's two sisters, Emma Blackler and Kay O’ Hanlon, and some former members of the original Drowned God creative team, including producer and co-creator Algy Williams, art director Alastair Graham, and one of the developers, Mike Gamble, who also co-founded Next Path Media. It fixes bugs and includes additional extra-game content, such as artwork and pitch documents.

== Reception ==
Reception

Review scores
Publication	Score
GameSpot	6.2/10
PC Gamer (US)	69%
Quandary	4/5
Just Adventure	B+
Entertainment Weekly	C+
Deseret News	Mixed
Newsweek	Positive
Topless Robot	Mixed
PC Games	B+
PC World	B−

Drowned God received mixed reviews, with many critics complimenting the game's ideas and imagery while giving a less favorable response to its audio, puzzles, and execution. GameSpot reviewer Vince Broady wrote that the game sounded very promising, and might "also raise awareness of the thread of deception that runs throughout recorded history." Steve Ramsey of Quandary said Drowned God presented its massive assortment of conspiracy theories entertainingly. Ray Ivey of Just Adventure called Drowned God "the strangest, creepiest, most psychedelic adventure game I've yet to come across." Although Ivey did not understand much of the game, he found it enjoyable, because "it made sense to the game's characters and creators."

T. Liam McDonald of PC Gamer wrote that he was "fascinated by the strong sense of style and the intellectual approach to terrific subject matter". Steven Levy and Patricia King of Newsweek found the game to be "richly detailed and original". In 2012, Andy Hughes of Topless Robot put the game at the top of his list of "9 Surprising Literary References In Videogames". Hughes wrote that the game was one that could be played from start to finish "without having any idea what the hell's going on", noting its references to a wide variety of subjects, including Egyptian mythology, The Man in the Iron Mask, and the Bermuda Triangle.

Broady complimented the graphics, writing, "Drowned God is loaded with freaky animations and unexpected visual twists". Ramsey praised the visuals and the audio, saying both contributed to the game's "shadowy and secretive feelings". His one significant criticism was that dialogue was difficult to hear, with no option to display text for it. Regarding the game's audio aspect, Broady said, "The soundtrack is less impressive, primarily because of overuse: The background effects drone on mercilessly, and many of the game's narratives (which are universally well-written and finely acted) must be listened to over and over again." In PC World, Shane Mooney wrote "Marvelous graphics, an original score, and quality voice-overs help immerse you in this very strange world."

The puzzles, according to Broady, were of uneven quality. He called some "hopelessly difficult" and others extremely derivative. By contrast, he viewed the Albert Einstein and Isaac Newton dialogue puzzle as "brilliant", but said, "Ideas as original as Horse's call for puzzles to match, not rehashes of things we've seen far too many times already." Ramsey thought the puzzles were challenging but not overly difficult, arguing "on almost every occasion I felt that I was making progress, and I never felt bogged down and hopelessly lost." He felt the puzzles were mostly well-integrated, and found those that were not did not detract from his enjoyment. Ivey remarked, "For puzzle lovers, Drowned God is a treasure trove. ... This collection of tricky puzzlers are challenging and frequently innovative."

Broady panned the navigation for being confusing, counter-intuitive, and requiring the player to revisit locations multiple times. He concluded his review by saying, "The net effect is that the story—which made this game so intriguing in the first place—is almost totally lost, and that is a shame." GameSpot considered the game one of the most disappointing of 1996 in their annual recap, writing "the great premise is buried like the mysteries of the ages themselves under a mediocre Myst clone". Bob Strauss of Entertainment Weekly opined that the game tried to be too many things, and quipped, "the result is a game so obscure, you'd be better off perusing something more comprehensible—like the collected works of Zoroaster." Mark Reece and Brooke Adams of Deseret News also had mixed feelings about the game, calling it both "clever and deep" and "frustrating and difficult". McDonald wrote that he was "frustrated by the lack of good game play." Hughes called the pace of the game and its puzzles both "tedious" and "ponderous", but said it "had ambition out the genetically modified ears." Mooney concluded, "The conspiracies are ultimately so convoluted that most players will end up dazed and confused."

The editors of CNET Gamecenter nominated Drowned God for their 1996 "Best Adventure Game" award, which ultimately went to The Neverhood. They wrote, "The National Enquirer meets Myst. For the adventure gamer with a taste for mouse-pounding puzzles—it just didn't get much better than this."
