= Crude (comic) =

- Crude volume 1 (2018). Cover art by Garry Brown.

Publication information
- Publisher: Image Comics/Skybound
- Schedule: Monthly
- Format: Ongoing series
- Genre: Action/Drama
- Publication date: April 2018
- No. of issues: 6

Creative team
- Created by: Steve Orlando, Garry Brown
- Written by: Steve Orlando
- Artist: Garry Brown
- Letterer: Thomas Mauer
- Colorist: Lee Loughridge
- Editor(s): Jon Moisan, Arielle Basich

Crude is a comic book series launched by Skybound Entertainment and Image Comics on April 11, 2018. The series was created by writer Steve Orlando and artist Garry Brown.

This story follows Piotr Petrovich, a former Russian assassin, who embarks on a journey to avenge the death of his son, Kirilchik. Along the way, Piotr learns more about his son's hidden, dangerous life. Through lies, sadness and violence, Crude explores the themes of father/son relationships as well as the universal desire to prove one's worth to the world, encapsulated by dark tones of anger and revenge.

== Plot ==
Killers once feared Piotr Petrovich. Now, they’ve sent his son home to him—in a body bag. Haunted by his failures, Piotr journeys across Russia to learn what type of man his son really was, while hunting the bastards who killed him. Once Piotr finds his son's killers, they will learn to fear him once more.

== Collected Editions ==
- Volume 1 (collects Crude #1-6, April 2018, ISBN 1-53430-861-X)
