= Malachy Tallack =

- Born: 20 November 1980 (age 45)
- Origin: Shetland
- Genres: Folk-rock
- Instruments: Vocals, guitar
- Years active: 2003–present
- Website: http://www.malachytallack.com

Malachy Tallack (born 20 November 1980) is a Shetland singer-songwriter, journalist and author, who was born in England and moved to Shetland with his family when he was ten years old.

He edited the magazine Shetland Life, and founded the online magazine The Island Review. He wrote a weekly column for the New Statesman about his experiences of rural life and living on a remote Scottish island, and has since published two books of non-fiction: Sixty Degrees North (2015), which was a BBC Radio 4 Book of the Week, and The Un-Discovered Islands (2016), which won the Edward Stanford Illustrated Travel Book of the Year Award 2017.

As a musician, Tallack has released three albums of folk-rock music, and supported Runrig on their 2007 UK tour.

== Discography ==
- The Desert

Tallack's debut album was released in 2003. The Desert featured Steven Laurenson on guitar, Michael Laurenson on bass and Rory Tallack on drums, as well as appearances from Donald Anderson, Jenna and Bethany Reid and Nancy Hunter. The album contained a mix of acoustic tracks and fast-paced rock songs.

- Edges & Spaces (2005)

Tallack's second album was recorded over the space of eight months in 2005. Edges & Spaces is a diverse collection of songs, highlighting Tallack's strengths as a songwriter and "an increasing musical focus and lyrical maturity". The album featured many guest artists from among Shetland's top musical talent, including Jenna Reid, Brian Nicolson, Grant Nicol, Margaret Scollay, Abby Hayward and Lise Sinclair.

- From the Thorn (2009)

From the Thorn was Tallack's third and latest album, released in June 2009. The album was recorded over the previous twelve months and included both solo acoustic songs and tracks recorded with Tallack's new band, comprising Astryd Jamieson on piano and vocals, Steven Laurenson on guitar and vocals, Graham Malcolmson on bass, Paul Mullay on drums and Rory Tallack on fiddle and vocals.

== Bibliography ==
=== Fiction ===
- The Valley at the Centre of the World (3 May 2018)

=== Non-fiction ===
- Sixty Degrees North: Around the World in Search of Home (1 July 2015)
- The Un-Discovered Islands: An Archipelago of Myths, Phantoms and Fakes (13 October 2016)
- Illuminated by Water: Nature, Memory and the Delights of a Fishing Life (7 July 2022)
