= Catriona McKay =

Scottish harpist and composer

- Born: Dundee, Scotland, UK
- Genres: Scottish, Celtic, folk
- Occupations: Musician, composer
- Instruments: Harp, piano
- Labels: Glimster
- Website: http://www.catrionamckay.co.uk/

Catriona McKay is a Scottish harpist and composer. She is a contemporary explorer on the Scottish harp (Clàrsach), having collaborated with folk and experimental musicians, as well as co-designing the Starfish McKay harp.

She is a member of the band Fiddlers' Bid and the Chris Stout Quintet.

== Discography ==
- Catriona McKay (2002, Glimster)
- Starfish (2007, Glimster)
- Harponium (2014, Glimster)

with Chris Stout

- Laebrack (2005, Greentrax Recordings)
- White Nights (2010, McKay Stout)
- Seavaigers (2014, McKay Stout)

with Chris Stout and Seamus Begley

- BEGLEY MCKAY STOUT (2014, McKay Stout)

with Olov Johansson

- Foogy (2009, Olov Johansson Musik)
- The auld Harp (2013, Olov Johansson Musik)

Fiddlers’ Bid

- Hamnataing (1998, Greentrax)
- Da Farder Ben Da Welcomer (2001, Greentrax)
- Naked and Bare (2005, Greentrax)
- All Dressed in Yellow (2009, Hairst Blinks)

Strange Rainbow with Alistair MacDonald

- invisible from land and sea (2008)
- Skimmerin (2009)

Chris Stout

- The First O' the Darkenin' (2004, Greentrax)
- Devil’s Advocate (2007 as Chris Stout Quintet, Greentrax)
- Chris Stout's Brazilian Theory - Live in Concert (2011, Chris Stout)

Other collaborations

- Aidan O'Rourke: An Tobar (2011, Navigator)
- Transatlantic Sessions 3(2007 BBC 2 ‘Scotland’s Music with Phil Cunningham’)

== Awards ==
- O’Carolan International Harp Festival in Keadue, Co. Roscommon, Ireland, harp champion (1990s)
- Royal Scottish Academy of Music and Drama (RSAMD), first class honours BA (1990s)
- BBC Radio 3 ‘Young Musician‘, finalist (1999)
- Jakez Francois International Celtic Harp Competition in Nantes, winner (2004)
- Scots Trad Music Awards ‘Instrumentalist of the Year’ (2007 and 2014)
- (As a member of the band) Scots Trad Music Awards ‘Album of the Year’ for Chris Stout Quintet's ‘Devil’s Advocate’ (2007) about as Fiddlers' Bid, see Fiddlers' Bid#Awards and achievements
