= Harry Horse =

English author, illustrator and political cartoonist (1960–2007)

- Born: Richard Horne; 9 May 1960; Coventry, Warwickshire, England
- Died: c. 10 January 2007 (aged 46); Papil, West Burra, Shetland Islands, Scotland
- Occupations: Author, illustrator, political cartoonist
- Spouse: Mandy Horne

Richard Horne (9 May 1960, Coventry – c.10 January 2007, Papil, West Burra), better known by the pen name Harry Horse, was a British author, illustrator and political cartoonist. He was also known as lead singer of the band Swamptrash. Born and raised in Coventry, Warwickshire, he moved to Edinburgh in 1978, where he adopted his pen name.

== Works ==
=== Books ===
His first book, Ogopogo, My Journey with the Loch Ness Monster, was published in 1983. He also wrote The Last... series of books; this included The Last Polar Bears, which was adapted into a 30-minute cartoon for CITV and a touring theatre production for the National Theatre of Scotland, and The Last Castaways, which won the Nestlé Smarties Book Prize.

=== Political cartoons ===
From 1987 to 1992 Horne was a political cartoonist for Scotland on Sunday and The Scotsman; he also drew until his death in 2007 for the Sunday Herald newspapers. His illustrations also appeared regularly in The Observer and The Independent newspapers.

=== Music ===
In the late eighties he was the singer and frontman of the Edinburgh band Swamptrash, which later evolved, without Horse, into Shooglenifty, which still performs.

=== Computer game ===
In 1996 he created, designed, and wrote a point-and-click adventure game for Time Warner called Drowned God: Conspiracy of the Ages. The game was based on a forged manuscript he had written a decade earlier, purporting to have been written by 19th-century poet Richard Henry Horne, who shares Horse's name.

=== Illustrations ===
His illustrations appeared in books as diverse as The Good Golf Guide to Scotland, a centenary edition of Dr. Jekyll and Mr. Hyde, two books by Martin C. Strong both published by Canongate Books (The Great Rock Discography, 1st–4th eds. (1994–1998) and The Wee Rock Discography (1996)) and the children's book Magus the Lollipop Man.

== Death ==
On 10 January 2007, Horne's body was discovered holding his wife Mandy, who had been terminally ill with multiple sclerosis, in their bungalow in Papil, West Burra. The Sunday Times reported on 13 July 2008 that rather than the "Romeo and Juliet" scene described in many articles relating their deaths, Horse had stabbed her more than thirty times, then killed their pets before turning the knife on himself; both of them bled to death. Actor Tam Dean Burn, who had in the week of Horse's death made a radio tribute to him, said in 2009 after speaking with Horse's female relatives that the 2008 report was "a cruel distortion". It is believed by some that his death was a murder, and not a suicide, as there were inconsistencies with the witness's testimonies, and the door to his home was open when the bodies were found.
