= Hoven Droven =

Swedish folk rock band

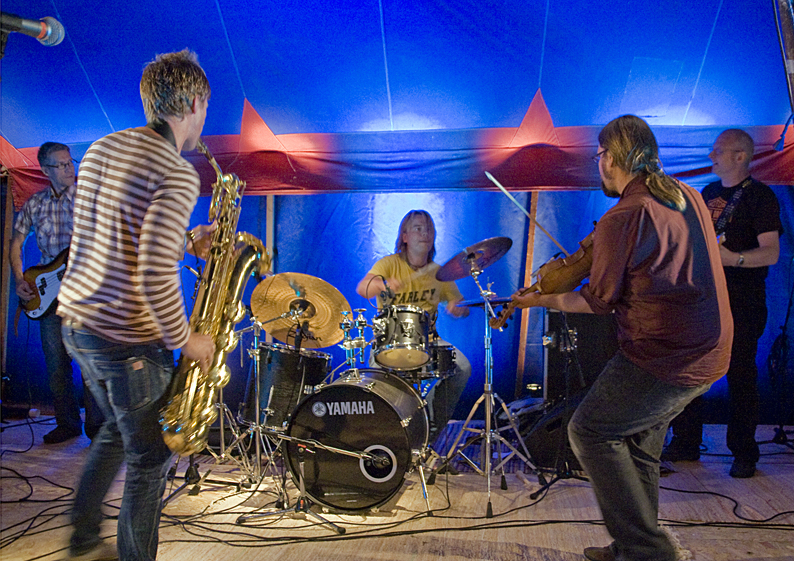
- Hoven Droven performing in 2008

Background information
- Origin: Östersund, Sweden
- Genres: Folk rock Nordic Roots Revival
- Years active: 1989 - present
- Labels: Home (Sweden), NorthSide (U.S.)
- Members: Pedro Blom, Jens Comén, Björn Höglund, Kjell-Erik Eriksson, Bosse "Bo" Lindberg
- Past members: Gustav Hylén, Janne Strömstedt
- Website: http://www.hovendroven.net/

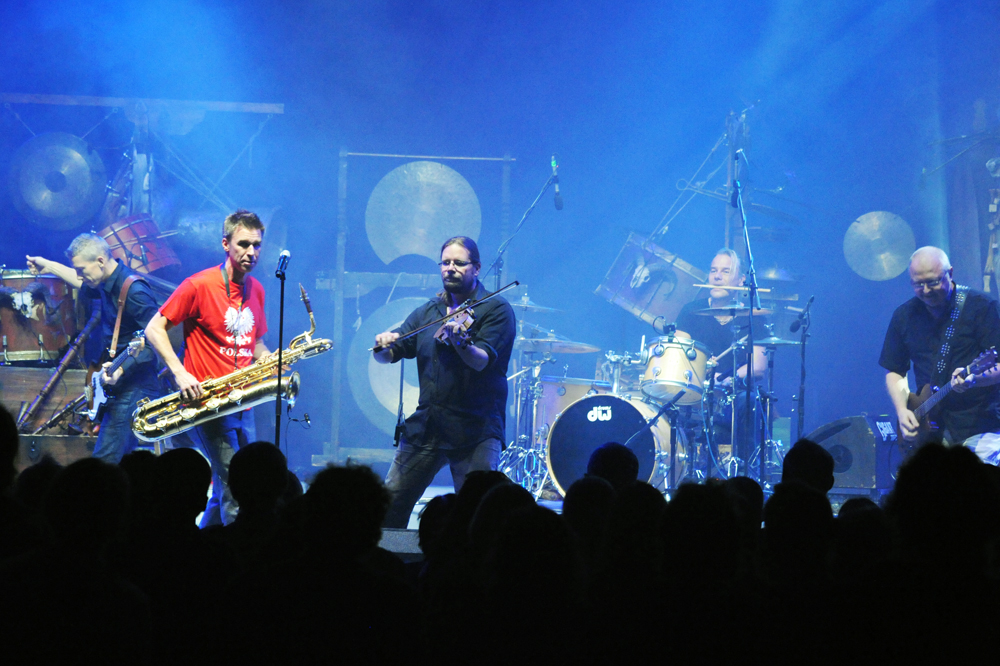
Performing at Warszawa Cross Culture Festival in September 2011

Hoven Droven is a Swedish folk rock band founded in 1989. They specialize in instrumental, hard rock arrangements of old Swedish folk tunes. The closest English translation of the Jamtish phrase "Hoven Droven" is "helter skelter" or "whatever."

Their 2006 album "Jumping at the Cedar" was nominated at the Swedish awards Grammis in the folk music category. Their music is distributed in the United States by the NorthSide label.

== Band members ==
=== Current members ===
- Pedro Blom, bass
- Jens Comén, saxophones
- Kjell-Erik Eriksson, violin
- Björn Höglund drums, percussion
- Bosse "Bo" Lindberg, guitar

=== Former members ===
- Gustav Hylén, trumpet, flugelhorn
- Janne Strömstedt, keyboards

=== Guest musicians ===
- Ulrika Bodén, vocals
- Sofia Sandén, vocals
- André Ferrari, drums

== Discography ==
- 1994 Hia-Hia (Xource/MNW (Sweden) XOUCD 110)
- 1996 Grov (Xource/MNW (Sweden) XOUCD 114)
- 1997 Groove (compilation from Hia Hia and Grov plus two live tracks, NorthSide (U.S.) NSD 6002)
- 1999 More Happy Moments with Hoven Droven (Home (Sweden) 013, NorthSide (U.S.) NSD 6043)
- 2001 Hippa (Home (Sweden) 020, NorthSide (U.S.) NSD 6062)
- 2004 Turbo (Home (Sweden) 032)
- 2006 Jumping at the Cedar (2-CD live compilation, Home (Sweden) 044, NorthSide (U.S.) NSD 6090)
- 2011 Rost (2011, Westpark, PGM-87217)
