= Hom Bru =

- Origin: Shetland, Scotland
- Genres: Folk
- Years active: 1978 – present
- Members: Gary Peterson; Davie Henry; Brian Nicholson; John Robert Deyell
- Website: http://www.hombru.co.uk

Hom Bru are a folk group from Shetland who formed in 1978. They moved to Edinburgh in 1980 and using the city as their base, toured all over Europe. In 1982 they moved back to Shetland and continue to perform regularly.

The band play a mixture of instrumental music, mainly traditional Shetland and Scandinavian tunes, and songs sung in Shetland dialect.

== Personnel ==
=== Current members ===
- Gary Peterson - tenor banjo, mandolin

Gary Peterson is a superb mandolinist with a mastery of the music of his native islands. The way he ornaments tunes is a joy to the ear and his use of short bursts of tremolo in place of the triplets others might use is especially distinctive and most impressive.

— Simon Carson, www.mandolin.org.uk

- Brian Nicholson - guitar, vocals

Brian is internationally recognised as one of Shetland's finest ever guitarists, whether in a traditional music context or performing music of a more contemporary nature. He has traded 'licks' with a number of very prominent guitarists, including Albert Lee who termed him "a world class guitarist", while he has supported the likes of Steve Earle and Rodney Crowell on their visits to Shetland, to name but two.

— Brian Nicholson article at www.shetland-music.com

- Davie Henry - mandolin, vocals
- John Robert Deyell - fiddle

=== Previous members ===
- Alec Johnson - bass, vocals
- George Faux - fiddle, mandolin, guitar, vocals
- Steven Spence - fiddle
- Peter Miller - bass, guitar, vocals
- Ivor Pottinger - guitar
- John Hutchison - guitar, vocals
- Stewart Isbister - bass, vocals
- Davy Tulloch - fiddle
- Bob Maclaine - fiddle
- Andrew Tulloch - guitar, vocals

== Reviews ==
Hom Bru have been playing their infectious blend of Shetland-based music for over twenty-five years now.... They have an instantly recognisable sound, with their blistering use of mandolin and banjo as lead instruments, all the more surprising, given the predominance of the fiddle in the Shetland tradition. The fire and attack that is brought to the livelier numbers does not come at the expense of sensitivity, with waltzes, slow airs and songs taking their place amongst the more fiery instrumentals.

— Extract from review by Gordon Potter of the "No Afore Time" album in The Living Tradition magazine.

== Discography ==
=== The First Swig ===
The First Swig

Studio album by Hom Bru
- Released: 1978
- Genre: folk
- Label: Viking Vision

First Swig was Hom Bru's debut album released in 1978. The album was recorded by Douglas Bentley in his Viking Vision "studio" which was actually the front shop of his electrical retail premises. The recording was released on cassette only.

==== Track listing ====
Side 1:

1. Nine points of roguery
2. Greenland whaling
3. Delta dawn
4. Till the rivers all run dry
5. Gardebylaten

Side 2:

1. Never on a Sunday
2. Fiddler's green
3. Banks of Newfoundland
4. The alamo
5. Scotland the brave

==== Personnel ====
Davie Henry (vocals, rhythm guitar, mandolin); Alec Johnson (bass, harmony vocals); Gary Peterson (drums, mandolin); Brian Nicholson (vocals)

=== Obadeea ===
Obadeea

Studio album by Hom Bru
- Released: 1982
- Genre: folk

Obadeea features a recording of "The Unst Boat Song" which is sung in the old Norn language

==== Track list ====
1. Christmas Day/The bonnie Isle of Whalsay (Trad.)/Leather reeches (Trad.)
2. Gardebylatten (Trad.)
3. Lassie lie near me (Trad.)
4. Chicago reel (Trad.)/The scholar (Trad.)/St Anne's reel (B. Scott)
5. Ragtime Jane (J. Elliot) - listen
6. The new song on the turnout (Lyrics trad, tune G. Faux)
7. The brolum (Dr.C.Bannatyne)/Pete da mill (G. Peterson)
8. Janine's shell (G. Faux), Sandy Bell's hornpipe (R. Smith)
9. Unst boat song (Trad.)
10. Garster's dream (Trad.)/Da brig (Stickle)/Da sooth end (W. Hunter)
11. Sandy burn reel (F. Jamieson)
12. Banks of the bann (Trad.)
13. The eighth Black Watch on Passchaendale Ridge (S. Bremner)/John Murray of Lochee (J. Hastings)

==== Personnel ====
Pete Miller (vocals, guitar, electric bass); George Faux (fiddle, mandolin, guitar, vocals); Gary Peterson (mandolin, tenor banjo, fiddle); Ivor Pottinger (guitar)

=== Rowin Foula Doon ===
Rowin' Foula Doon

Studio album by Hom Bru
- Released: 1990
- Genre: folk

==== Track list ====
1. Sylvia / Tulloch's farewell tae da Hagdale
2. Rowin' Foula doon - Da song o' da Papamen
3. Huckleberry hornpipe / Homesteader's rell / Donkey reel
4. Caladonia
5. Niamh's capers / Toss the feathers / The pinch of snuff
6. Shaskeen / Paddy Faheys / Fair Jenny
7. Miss Rowan Davies
8. Smugglers
9. I'll remember you this way
10. Moving cloud

==== Personnel ====
Peter Miller (vocals, guitar); Steven Spence (fiddle); Gary Peterson (mandolin, tenor banjo); Davie Henry (vocals, mandolin); Ivor Pottinger (vocals, guitar)

=== No Afore Time ===
No Afore Time

Studio album by Hom Bru
- Released: 2003
- Genre: folk

==== Track list ====
1. Coopers Reels
2. Da Sang O' Da Delting Lass
3. Suzi's Waltz
4. Scarce O' Tatties Set
5. Da Sang O' Da Fisher Lad
6. Recuerdos De La Alhambra
7. Hornpipes
8. Da Trowie Song
9. Serendipity
10. Hoedown Set
11. High Rockin Swing
12. Da Lass O' Hascosay
13. Bonnie Nancy
14. The Harley Set
15. Simmer Dim

==== Personnel ====
Brian Nicholson (vocals, guitar, bass guitar); John Robert Deyell (fiddle); Gary Peterson (mandolin, tenor banjo); Davie Henry (vocals, mandolin); John Hutchison (vocals, guitar)
