= Chris Stout =

Scottish fiddle/violin player

- Also known as: Christopher Stout
- Occupations: Professional musician and composer
- Instrument: Violin/fiddle/viola
- Label: Greentrax
- Member of: Fiddlers' Bid
- Website: http://www.chrisstout.co.uk

Chris Stout (born 1976) is a Scottish fiddle/violin player from Shetland, now based in Glasgow. Stout grew up in Fair Isle and lived there until 8 years of age before moving to Sandwick on the Shetland Mainland, then on to Glasgow in the 1990s.

Stout has studied under prominent Shetland fiddlers including Willie Hunter and Arthur Scott Robertson and is adept at a variety of violin styles, drawing on a range of influences from folk, jazz, electronica and classical.

In 1990 he won both the Shetland "Young Fiddler of the Year" competition for his skills as a traditional fiddle player and the Shetland "Young Musician of the Year" competition for his classical violin abilities.

In 2015, Hirda, A New Opera for Shetland, co-composed with Irish composer, Gareth Williams and produced by NOISE, toured Shetland and performed in Glasgow and Edinburgh

== Education ==
- Fair Isle primary school, Shetland
- Dunrossness Primary, Shetland
- Sandwick school, Shetland
- Anderson High School, Shetland
- Douglas Academy music school, Glasgow
- Royal Scottish Academy of Music and Drama (RSAMD), Glasgow (attained a degree in classical violin)
- Royal Scottish Academy of Music and Drama (RSAMD), Glasgow (attained a master's degree in electro-acoustic music)

== Discography ==
=== Solo albums ===
- First O' the Darkenin (2004)
- Devil's Advocate (2007)

=== Groups and collaborations ===
- ó, Beaglaoich S, Catriona McKay, and Chris Stout. Begley, Mckay, Stout., 2014. Sound recording.
- Fiddlers' Bid – Around the World (1994)
- Fiddlers' Bid – Hamnataing (1998)
- DJ Trevor Reilly – Down with the Underground, and mix by Judge Jules (1998)
- Various – Big Sky (1999)
- Finlay MacDonald – Finlay MacDonald (2000)
- The Clydesiders – Crossing the Borders (2000)
- Keltic Electrik (2000)
- Duncan McCrone – Just a Glasgow Boy (2001)
- Dean Owens – "Anything" (CD single) (2001)
- Fiddlers' Bid – Da Farder den Da Welcomer (2002)
- Annie Whitehead and Alistair Anderson – Northern Lights (2002)
- Catriona McKay – Catriona McKay (2002)
- Finlay MacDonald Band – Pressed for Time (2003)
- Salsa Celtica – El Agua De La Vida (2003)
- Kevin Mackenzie's Vital Signs – Another New Horizon (2004)
- Blair Douglas – Angles from the Ashes (2004)
- Joseph Malik – Aquarius Songs (2004)
- Yvonne Lyon – Fearless (2005)
- Duncan McCrone – All You Need to Know (2005)
- The Unusual Suspects – Live in Scotland (2005)
- Catriona McKay and Chris Stout – Laebrack (2005)
- Fiddlers' Bid – Naked and Bare (2005)
- Christianne Neves – Duas Madrugadas (2005)
- Salsa Celtica – El Camino (2006)
- Finlay MacDonald Band – Re-Echo (2007)
- Yvonne Lyon – A Thousand Questions Why (2007)
- Lise Sinclair – Ivver Enchantin Wis (2007)
- The Macdonald Bros (2007)
- Fiddlers' Bid – All Dressed in Yellow (2009)
- Catriona McKay & Chris Stout - White Nights (2010)
- Chris Stout's Brazilian Theory Live in Concert (2011)
- Brend Works (2012)
- Kyle Carey - North Star (2014)
- Catriona McKay & Chris Stout - White Nights (2010)
- Chris Stout & Catriona McKay, Scottish Ensemble - Seavaigers (2014)
- Chris Stout & Catriona McKay - Bare Knuckle (2017)

=== As a producer ===
- Tommy O'Sullivan – Songs Ablaze (2006)
- Lauren MacColl – When Leaves Fall (2007)
