= Emma Härdelin =

Swedish musician (born 1975)

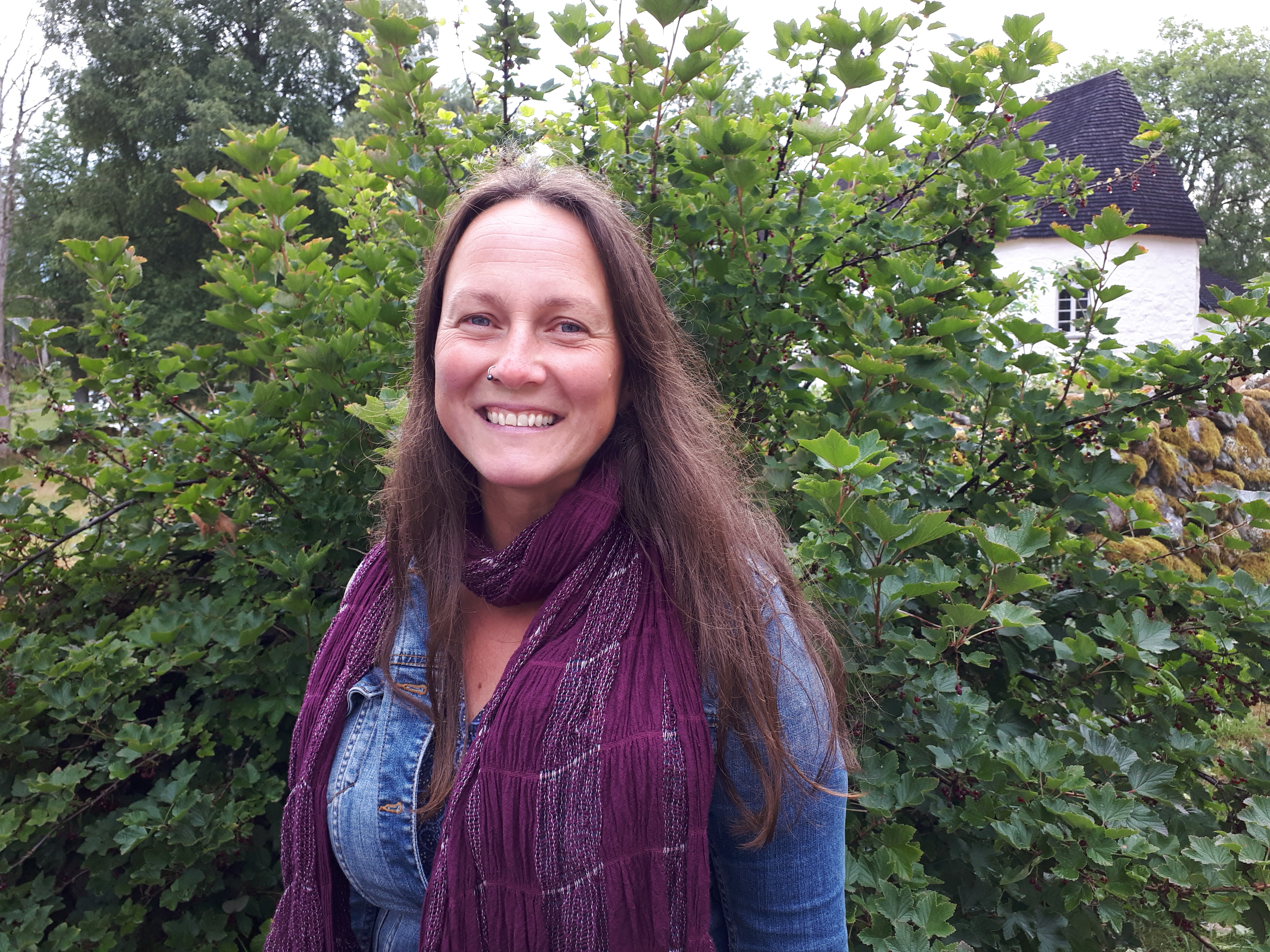
- Emma Härdelin 2018

Background information
- Born: Emma Härdelin; September 26, 1975 (age 50); Kluk, Jämtland, Sweden
- Genres: Folk, folk-rock
- Occupations: Musician, singer
- Instruments: Violin, vocals
- Years active: 1993–present
- Member of: Garmarna, Triakel, Blindside, String Sisters

Emma Härdelin (born 26 September 1975) is a Swedish musician. She is a violinist and lead singer in folk-rock band Garmarna, which she joined in 1993 for their first album, and also lead singer for the folk band Triakel.

== Early life and career ==
Härdelin was born into a family of nationally acclaimed musicians as the daughter of Swedish traditional fiddler Thore Härdelin. She grew up in Kluk, Jämtland, and Delsbo, Hälsingland. After attending a Waldorf school and studying Swedish folk singing under Maria Röjås at Malung folkhögskola, she became a member of Garmarna in 1993 and founded Triakel in 1995 together with Kjell-Erik Eriksson of Hoven Droven and Janne Strömstedt.

In 2004, she appeared on Blindside's album About a Burning Fire, on the song Shekina. 2005 saw the release of Kärleksbrev och ryska satelliter, a folk album by Härdelin, Kersti Ståbi, Johanna Bölja Hertzberg, and Katarina Hallberg. She also performs on a recording of Swedish music from Estonia entitled Strand...Rand. In 2007, Emma released an album with String Sisters, a sextet featuring other fiddlers including Altan's Mairéad Ní Mhaonaigh.
