= Kate Rusby discography =

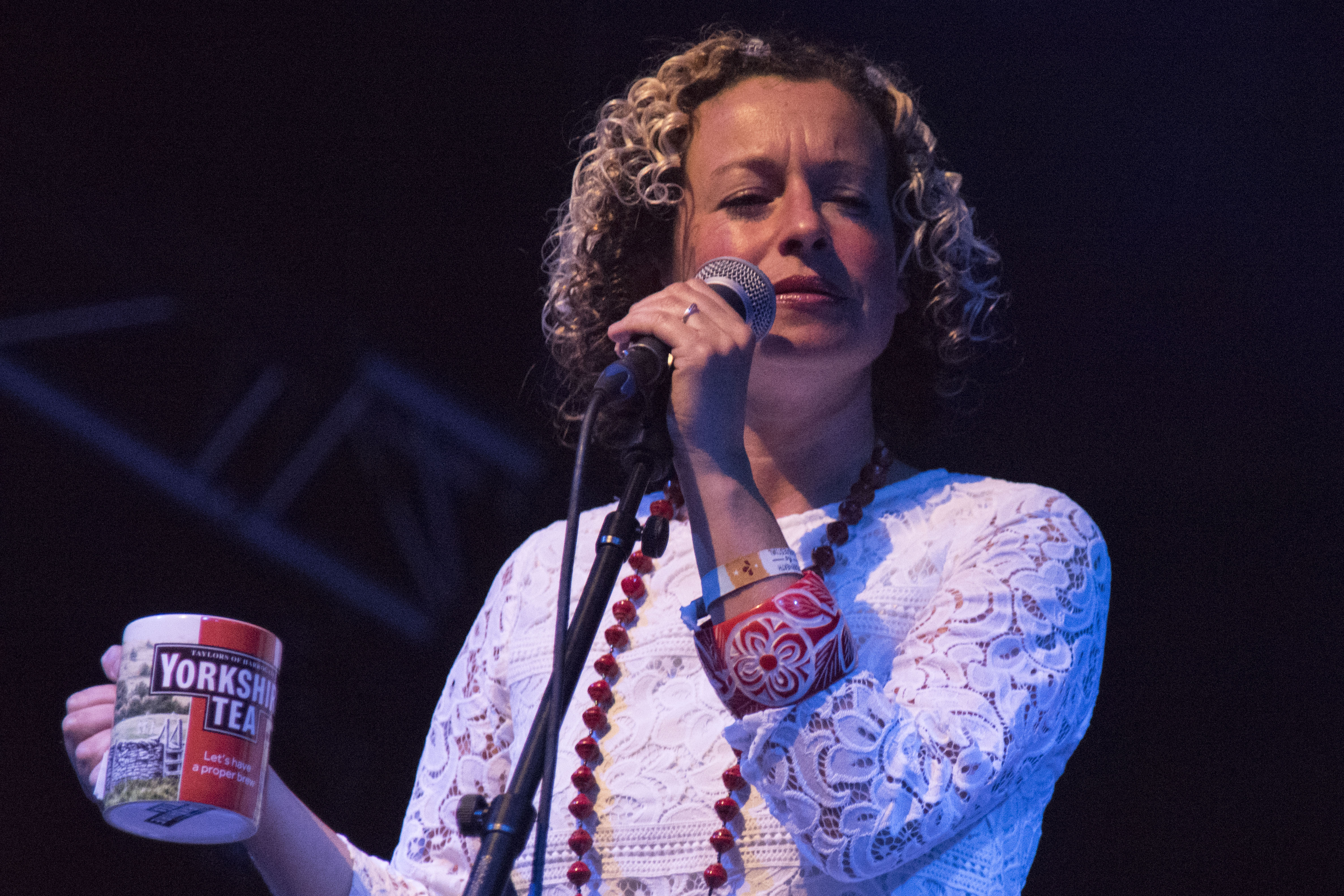
- Rusby on stage at the Underneath the Stars Festival
- Studio albums: 26
- Extended plays: 4
- Singles: 14
- Music videos: 7

The discography of Kate Rusby, an English folk singer, consists of twenty-two solo albums, four albums as part of a duo or group, four extended plays (EPs), two video albums, fourteen singles, and seven music videos. Rusby's debut was Intuition, an album recorded in collaboration with five other female singers from Yorkshire, which was released on a small label in 1993. Her breakthrough came with an eponymous album recorded with Kathryn Roberts, another of the singers featured on Intuition. This album, which was named as the best of the year by Folk Roots magazine, was the first release on Pure Records, a label set up by Rusby's father on which all her subsequent solo recordings have been released. Rusby and Roberts also formed the band the Equation in conjunction with the Lakeman Brothers, but Rusby left the group after their debut EP. In 1996 she joined the all-female folk group the Poozies, with whom she released one EP and one full-length album.

In 1997 Rusby released her first solo album, Hourglass, and two years later followed it with Sleepless, which was nominated for the Mercury Music Prize. Two years later, Little Lights became Rusby's first release to enter the Top 100 of the UK Albums Chart, peaking at number 75. Her highest placing on this chart came with 2012's 20, which reached number 22. In 2006 she provided guest vocals on the single "All Over Again" by Irish pop singer Ronan Keating, which reached number six on the UK Singles Chart. Rusby has also made guest appearances on albums by artists such as Show of Hands, Battlefield Band, Roddy Woomble, Ella Edmondson and John McCusker.

== Albums ==
=== Solo albums ===
Year	Album details	Peak chart positions	
Year	Album details	UK	US World
1998	Hourglass: Released: 1 March 1997; Label: Pure; Formats: CD	—	—
1999	Sleepless: Released: 17 August 1999; Label: Pure; Formats: CD	—	—
2001	Little Lights: Released: 12 June 2001; Label: Pure; Formats: CD	75	—
2002	10: Released: 7 January 2003; Label: Pure; Formats: CD	—	—
2003	Underneath the Stars: Released: 11 August 2003; Label: Pure; Formats: CD	78	10
2005	The Girl Who Couldn't Fly: Released: 11 October 2005; Label: Pure; Formats: CD	45	—
2007	Awkward Annie: Released: 14 August 2007; Label: Pure; Formats: CD	32	—
2008	Sweet Bells: Released: 15 December 2008; Label: Pure; Formats: CD	91	—
2010	Make the Light: Released: 22 November 2010; Label: Pure; Formats: CD	99	—
2011	While Mortals Sleep: Released: 22 November 2011; Label: Pure; Formats: CD	91	—
2012	20: Released: 22 October 2012; Label: Pure; Formats: CD	22	—
2014	Ghost: Released: 4 August 2014; Label: Pure; Formats: CD	—	—
2015	The Frost Is All Over: Released: 27 November 2015; Label: Pure; Formats: CD	—	—
2016	Life in a Paper Boat: Released: 7 October 2016; Label: Pure; Formats: CD	98	—
2017	Angels & Men: Released: 24 November 2017; Label: Pure; Formats: CD	40	—
2019	Philosophers, Poets & Kings: Released: 31 May 2019; Label: Pure; Formats: CD	—	—
2019	Holly Head: Released: 2019; Label: Pure; Formats: CD	—	—
2020	Hand Me Down: Released: 2020; Label: Pure; Formats: CD	12	—
2022	30: Happy Returns: Released: 6 May 2022; Label: Pure; Formats: CD, download	97	—
2023	Light Years: Released: 1 December 2023; Label: Pure; Formats: CD, download	76	—
2025	When They All Looked Up: Released: 25 April 2025; Label: Pure; Formats: Vinyl, CD, download	—	—
2025	Christmas Is Merry: Released: 5 December 2025; Label: Pure; Formats: CD	—	—
"—" denotes releases that did not chart or were not released in that country.

=== Collaborative albums ===
Year	Album details
1993	Intuition (with Kathleen Deighton, Rosalie Deighton, Julie Matthews, Kathryn Roberts and Pat Shaw): Released: 1993; Label: Fat Cat; Formats: CD, cassette
1995	Kate Rusby & Kathryn Roberts (with Kathryn Roberts): Released: 1995; Label: Pure; Formats: CD, cassette
1999	Infinite Blue (as a member of The Poozies): Released: 19 January 1999; Label: Pure; Formats: CD
2004	Heartlands (with John McCusker): Released: 18 October 2004; Label: Pure; Formats: CD

== Extended plays ==
Year	Title	Notes
1995	In Session: Released: 1995; Label: Crapstone; Format: CD	As a member of the Equation
1997	Come Raise Your Head: Released: 1997; Label: Pure; Format: CD	As a member of the Poozies
1999	Cowsong: Released: 1999; Label: Pure; Format: CD	
2004	Underneath the Stars: Released: 2004; Label: Pure; Format: CD	

== Singles ==
Year	Title	UK	Album
2001	"Withered and Died"	—	Little Lights
2004	"Underneath the Stars"	—	Underneath the Stars
2005	"No Names"	—	The Girl Who Couldn't Fly
2005	"You Belong to Me"	—	The Girl Who Couldn't Fly
2005	"Little Jack Frost"	—	The Girl Who Couldn't Fly
2006	"All Over Again" (duet with Ronan Keating)	6	Bring You Home
2007	"Planets"	—	Awkward Annie
2007	"The Village Green Preservation Society"	—	Awkward Annie
2008	"Who Knows Where the Time Goes?"	—	non-album single
2019	"Jenny"	—	Philosophers, Poets & Kings
2020	"Manic Monday"	—	Hand Me Down
2020	"Friday I'm in Love"	—	Hand Me Down
2020	"Shake It Off"	—	Hand Me Down
2023	"Glorious"	—	Light Years

== Video albums ==
Year	Video information	Notes
2004	Live From Leeds: Released: 29 June 2004; Label: Pure; Director: Janet Fraser Crook	Recorded live at the Leeds City Varieties; Originally broadcast on BBC Four
2013	Live at Christmas: Released: 28 October 2013; Label: Pure; Director: not credited	Recorded live at the Royal Hall, Harrogate

== Music videos ==
Year	Title	Director
2006	"All Over Again"	Simon Levene
2016	"Big Brave Bill"	unknown
2017	"Big Brave Bill Saves Christmas"	Jay Sillence
2019	"Jenny"	unknown
2020	"Manic Monday"	Kate Rusby and Damien O'Kane
2020	"Shake It Off"	Kate Rusby and Damien O'Kane
2019	"Glorious"	unknown

== Other appearances ==
=== Soundtracks ===
Year	Song	Album
1996	"The Collier Recruit" "Broken-Hearted I Will Wander"	Over the Hills & Far Away: The Music of Sharpe

=== Compilation albums ===
- Only otherwise unreleased material included on compilation albums is listed

Year	Song	Album/Single
1999	"The Cobbler's Daughter"	Cambridge Folk Festival: A Celebration of Roots Music 1998-99
2004	"I Wonder What's Keeping My True Love Tonight?"	Folk Festival: A Celebration of Music Recorded at the Sidmouth International Festival
2006	"It's Curtains"	The Song of Steel
2006	"Underneath the Stars"	Cool as Folk
2011	"Butterfly"	Davy Steele: Steele the Show
2011	"Awkward Annie" "The Mocking Bird" "The Blind Harper"	Cambridge Folk Festival 2011 (DVD)

=== Guest appearances ===
Year	Artist	Album	Credit	Track(s)
1995	Chris Sherburn & Denny Bartley	Last Night's Fun	Vocals	"The Roseville Fair/The Concert Reel" "Starry Night"
1997	Battlefield Band	Across the Borders	Vocals	"The Green and the Blue"
1997	Roy Bailey	New Directions in the Old	Vocals	"Light Years Away"
1999	Show of Hands	Dark Fields	Vocals	"High Germany/Molly Oxford"
2000	Gibb Todd	Connected	Harmony vocals, box	"The Final Trawl" "Will Ye No Come Back Again"
2000	John McCusker	Yella Hoose	Vocals	"Night Visiting Song"
2001	Cathie Ryan	Somewhere Along the Road	Vocals	"Somewhere Along the Road"
2002	Linda Thompson	Fashionably Late	Guitar, harmony vocals	"Miss Murray" "No Telling"
2003	John McCusker	Goodnight Ginger	Vocals	"The Bold Privateer"
2005	John Doyle	Wayward Son	Vocals	"Bitter the Parting"
2005	Cherish the Ladies	Woman of the House	Vocals	"Bogie's Bonnie Belle"
2006	Kris Drever	Black Water	Harmony vocals	"Braw Sailin' on the Sea" "Green Grows the Laurel" "Navigator"
2006	Roddy Woomble	My Secret is My Silence	Vocals	"I Came in from the Mountain" "Act IV" "From the Drifter to the Drake" "Waverley Steps" "Play Me Something"
2007	Various artists	Ballads of the Book	Vocals	"The Weight of Years" (by Idlewild and Edwin Morgan)
2007	Martin Simpson	Prodigal Son	Vocals	"Never Any Good"
2009	Maura O'Connell	Naked with Friends	Harmony vocals	"The Bright Blue Rose"
2009	Ella Edmondson	Hold Your Horses	Vocals	not specified
2010	Damien O'Kane	Summer Hill	Vocals	"Summer Hill" "Raven's Wing" "The Sun is Burning"
2014	West of Eden	Songs from Twisting River	Vocals	"The Bee That Stung"
2015	Damien O'Kane	Areas of High Traffic	Vocals	"Banks of the Bann"
2017	Damien O'Kane	Avenging & Bright	Vocals	"Lately"
