= Michael McGoldrick =

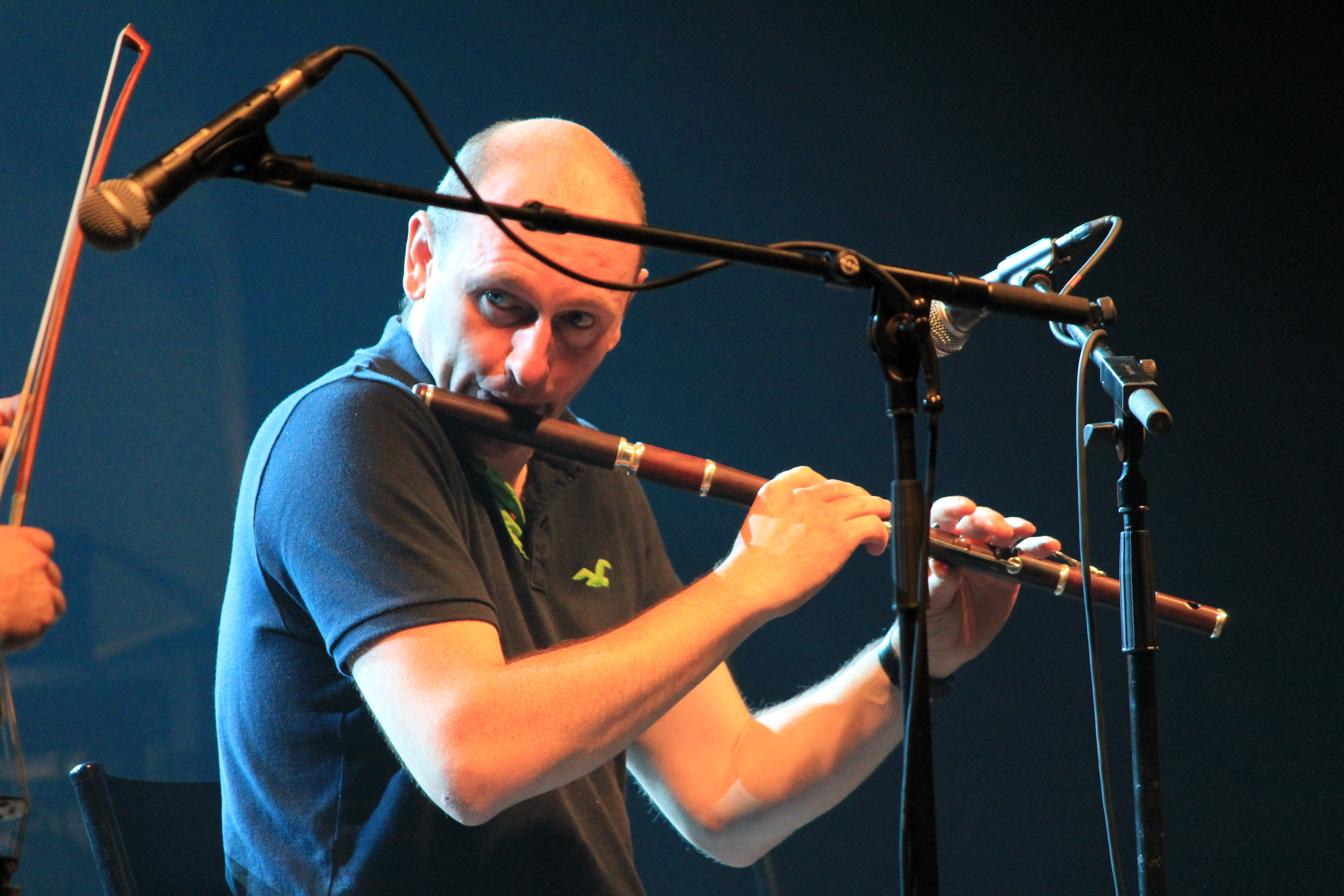
- Michael McGoldrick live in at the Festival Interceltique de Lorient in 2012.

Background information
- Born: Michael McGoldrick; 26 November 1971 (age 54); Manchester, England
- Genres: Celtic, folk
- Occupations: Multi-instrumentalist, composer, producer
- Instruments: Irish flute, tin whistle, low whistle, uilleann pipes, tenor guitar, bodhrán, cittern, vocals
- Years active: 1980s–present
- Label: Vertical

Michael McGoldrick (born 26 November 1971, in Manchester, England) is a folk musician who plays Irish flute, uilleann pipes, low whistle and bodhran. He also plays other instruments such as acoustic guitar, cittern, and mandolin.

== Bands ==
McGoldrick has been a member of several influential bands. In 1994, he was awarded the BBC Young Tradition Award, and in 2001 he was given the Instrumentalist of the Year award at the BBC Radio 2 Folk Awards.

McGoldrick was a founding member of the Celtic rock band Toss the Feathers while still at school. During this time, he competed at the Fleadhanna with fiddler Dezi Donnelly, whom he had met through local Comhaltas meetings. He appeared at various local and national festivals and ran whistle/flute workshops at the Cambridge Folk Festival and for Folkworks on their "Flutopia" concert tour.

In the mid-1990s, McGoldrick was a member of Arcady, performing and recording with the band during its later years.

In November 1995, McGoldrick co-founded the band Fluke! (later renamed as Flook) with Brian Finnegan and Sarah Allen. After one tour, he left the group to pursue other musical projects.

From 1997 until 2000, McGoldrick waws an early member of Lúnasa, performing on the group's initial recordings and tours. In 1998, he joined the Scottish Gaelic band Capercaillie, with whom he has recorded eight albums to date, including two live releases.

McGoldrick played regularly with Afro-Celt Sound System and has been a longstanding member of Kate Rusby's touring and recording band. He has also led his own ensemble, Michael McGoldrick Band, since the late 2000s.

In addition to larger ensembles, McGoldrick has been active in smaller collaborative projects, including long-running duos and trios with musicians such as John Doyle, John McCusker, Tim Edey, John Carty, and Dezi Donnelly, resulting in several studio and live recordings.

Since 2007, McGoldrick has been a regular member of the house band for the Transatlantic Sessions, where he has performed both traditional material and his own compositions and arrangements.

In 2010, Michael temporarily replaced John McCusker, joining Tim O'Brien on Mark Knopfler's US leg of the Get Lucky Tour. Following this stint, he continued with the band for the European leg of the workd tour. As of 2024, McGoldrick remains an active touring and recording member of Mark Knopfler's band.

In the early 2020s, McGoldrick became a member of Usher's Island, a folk supergroup featuring Andy Irvine, Donal Lunny, Paddy Glackin, and John Doyle, contributing to recordings and live performance.

In 2025, Michael released a tune collection and accompanying recording titled 50 Original Tunes and Chords, featuring Donald Shaw on piano and Innes White on guitar.

== Discography ==
=== Solo/duo/trio ===
==== Solo ====
Year	Album	Notes
1996	Morning Rory	Aughrim Records AUGH01
2000	Fused	Vertical Records VERTCD051
2005	Wired	Vertical Records VERTCD074
2010	Aurora	Vertical Records VERTCD090
2018	Arc	Vertical Records VERTCD111
2020	Waterman's (Live)	Vertical Records
2025	50 Original Tunes and Chords	

==== Duo/Trio ====
Year	Album	w/Artists	Notes
1995	Champions of the North	Dezi Donnelly	Magnetic Music
2001	At First Light	John McSherry	Vertical Records VERTCD061
2018	Dog in the Fog	Dezi Donnelly	Boxroom Music
2020	Mike McGoldrick & John Doyle	John Doyle	Boxroom Music
2022	At Our Leisure	John Carty	Racket Records
2024	Jamland	Tim Edey	
2012	Live	John McCusker & John Doyle	Vertical Records
2016	The Mark Radcliffe Folk Sessions	John McCusker & John Doyle	Smooth Operations
2018	The Wishing Tree	John McCusker & John Doyle	Under One Sky Records UOSR004
2020	The Reed That Bends in the Storm	John McCusker & John Doyle	Under One Sky Records UOSR007
2020	Christmas at Home	John McCusker & John Doyle	
2021	At Home This Spring (Live)	John McCusker & John Doyle	Under One Sky Records UOSR009
2024	The Best Of	John McCusker & John Doyle	Under One Sky Records UOSR011
2026	Between the Mountain and the Sea	John McCusker & John Doyle	Under One Sky Records

=== As band member of ===
Year	Album	Band	Notes
1988	Live at the 32	Toss the Feathers	Bop Cassettes
1989	Columbus Eclipse	Toss the Feathers	
1993	Rude Awakening	Toss the Feathers	
1991	Awakening	Toss the Feathers	
1994	TTF'94	Toss the Feathers	
1995	The Next Round	Toss the Feathers	
1995	Many Happy Returns	Arcady	Dara Records DARACD080
1996	Flook! Live!	Flook	Small CD 9405
1997	Beautiful Wasteland	Capercaillie	Survival Records
1998	Dawn Till Dusk (The Best of Capercaillie)	Capercaillie	Survival Records
2000	Nàdurra	Capercaillie	Survival Records
2002	Live in Concert	Capercaillie	Survival Records
2003	Choice Language	Capercaillie	Vertical Records
2004	Grace And Pride: The Anthology 1984-2004	Capercaillie	Survival Records
2008	Roses and Tears	Capercaillie	Vertical Records
2013	At the Heart of It All	Capercaillie	Vertical Records
2024	ReLoved	Capercaillie	Vertical Records
1998	Lúnasa	Lúnasa	Self-released
1999	Otherworld	Lúnasa	Green Linnet
2008	The Story So Far...	Lúnasa	Compass Records
1997	Hourglass	Kate Rusby	Compass Records
1998	Cowsong	Kate Rusby	Pure Records
1999	Sleepless	Kate Rusby	Compass Records
2001	Little Lights	Kate Rusby	Pure Records
2001	Withered And Died	Kate Rusby	Pure Records
2002	10	Kate Rusby	Pure Records
2003	Underneath The Stars	Kate Rusby	Pure Records
2005	The Girl Who Couldn't Fly	Kate Rusby	Pure Records
2007	Awkward Annie	Kate Rusby	Pure Records
2012	20	Kate Rusby	Pure Records, Mighty Village, & Island Records
2014	Ghost	Kate Rusby	Pure Records
2016	Life in a Paper Boat	Kate Rusby	Pure Records
2022	30: Happy Years	Kate Rusby	Pure Records
2000	All in a Life	Eden's Bridge	Straightway Records
2002	Isle of Tides	Eden's Bridge	Whole World Media Group
2005	New Celtic Worship	Eden's Bridge	Whole World Media Group
2005	Tunes	Sharon Shannon, Frankie Gavin, Jim Murray	Compass Records
2006	Upside Down	Sharon Shannon, Dezi Donnelly, Jim Murray	The Daisy Label
2007	Renegade	Sharon Shannon, Dezi Donnelly, Jim Murray	The Daisy Label
2011	Future Trad Collective	Future Trad Collective	Vertical Records
2001	Celtic Melt	Celtic Melt	Cavendish Music
2017	Usher's Island	Usher's Island	Vertical Records
2024	One for the Road	The McGoldrick Family	
2009	Border Reiver (Single)	Mark Knopfler	Reprise Records
2009	Get Lucky	Mark Knopfler	Reprise Records
2012	Privateering	Mark Knopfler	Mercury Records
2015	Tracker	Mark Knopfler	Verve
2018	Down the Road Wherever	Mark Knopfler	Virgin Records
2024	One Deep River	Mark Knopfler	EMI/British Grove

=== As guest artist/other ===
Year	Album	Artist(s)
1997	Straight on No Problem	Anthony John Clarke
1998	Spellbound	Ten
1998	1 Douar	Alan Stivell
1999	Volume 1: The Source	Big Sky
1999	Volume 2: Release	Afro Celt Sound System
1999	Identités	Idir
1999	Missa Celtica	John Cameron
2000	Seal Maiden	Karan Casey
2000	Yella Hoose	John McCusker
2000	New Celtic Music From Green Linnet	Various
2000	Ceol Tacsi	Various
2001	Two Journeys	Tim O'Brien
2001	The Wind Begins To Sing	Karan Casey
2001	Raining Up	Mairead Nesbitt
2001	Cambridge Folk Festival - A Celebration of Roots Music 1997-1999	Various
2002	Live Recordings From The William Kennedy Piping Festival	Various
2002	50 US Cents	Reel & Soul Association
2002	Warm & Tender Love (Single)	Reel & Soul Association
2002	The Acoustic Folk Box	Various
2002	Through the Round Window	Eamonn Coyne
2002	Time To Fall	Karen Matheson
2003	Distant Shore	Karan Casey
2003	What Road?	Session A9
2003	If Not Now	e2K
2004	The Arms Dealer's Daughter	Shooglenifty
2004	Musical Tour of New Zealand	Billy Connolly
2004	Miles Apart	Leon Hunt
2004	Movin'	Human Touch
2005	Shots	Damien Dempsey
2005	ZOOM ZOOM ZOOM	Aquarium
2005	Wayward Son	John Doyle
2005	Downriver	Karen Matheson
2005	Strategy	Horace X
2005	Earthsongs	Secret Garden
2005	The Essential Collection 1995–2005	Ten
2005	Hands Across The Water	Various
2005	Folktopia - Music of Vertical Records, Vol. 1	Various
2005	The Furthest Wave	Cathie Ryan
2005	Raining Up	Máiréad
2006	My Secret Is My Silence	Roddy Woomble
2006	The Seventh Veil	Theresa Kavanagh
2006	Live Acoustic at the Jam House	Ocean Colour Scene
2006	The Songs of The Radio Ballads	Various
2006	Og Mhadainn Shamhraidh	Kathleen MacInnes
2006	Música na Maleta	Tejedor
2007	Peacetime	Eddi Reader
2007	Cuilidh	Julie Fowlis
2007	Prism	Beth Nielsen Chapman
2007	Across The Black River	Kevin Burke & Cal Scott
2007	Cool As Folk - Cambridge Folk Festival	Various
2008	Before the Ruin	Kris Drever, John McCusker & Roddy Woomble
2008	Yella House + Goodnight Ginger	John McCusker
2008	In Love + Love	Heidi Talbot
2009	Imeall	Mairéad Ní Mhaonaigh
2009	Wells For Zoë - Water For Life	Various
2010	Exiles Return	John Doyle and Karan Casey
2010	On the Move	Colin Farrell
2010	Bretonne	Nolwenn Leroy
2010	Summer Hill	Damien O'Kane
2010	Last Star	Heidi Talbot
2010	Capture 1995-2010	Afro Celt Sound System
2010	Celtic Roots	Various
2010	Transatlantic Sessions - Series 4: Volume 2	Transatlantic Sessions: Jerry Douglas, Aly Bain, & Various
2010	Transatlantic Sessions - Series 4: Volume 3	Transatlantic Sessions: Jerry Douglas, Aly Bain, & Various
2011	Transatlantic Sessions - Series 5: Volume 1	Transatlantic Sessions: Jerry Douglas, Aly Bain, & Various
2011	Shadow And Light	John Doyle
2011	Out on the Edge	Chris Dawson
2012	Ô Filles De L'Eau	Nolwenn Leroy
2012	All The Way Home	Cathy Jordan
2012	Only Boys Aloud	Only Boys Aloud
2012	Chimes of Freedom: The Songs of Bob Dylan	Various
2012	Die Wanderhure - Best Of	Stephan Massimo
2012	The Sailor's Revenge	Bap Kennedy
2012	Five And Twenty	Aly Bain & Phil Cunningham
2013	Angels Without Wings	Heidi Talbot
2013	These Wilder Things	Ruth Moody
2013	Полная Дискография	Aquarium
2014	Gach Sgeul - Every Story	Julie Fowlis
2014	Songs from Twisting River	West of Eden
2014	Homecoming - A Scottish Fantasy	Nicole Benedetti
2014	Transatlantic Session - Series 6: Volume 3	Transatlantic Sessions: Jerry Douglas, Aly Bain, & Various
2015	Make a Note	Colin Farrell
2015	JEKYLL + HYDE	Zac Brown Band
2015	Encore Heureux	Zazie
2015	Complicated Game	James McMurty
2015	Urram	Karen Matheson
2015	Katie Morag (Music from the BBC Series)	Donald Shaw
2015	The Widening Gyre	Altan
2015	Vagabond	Eddi Reader
2016	My Secret Is My Silence	Roddy Woombie
2016	Altamira	Mark Knopfler & Evelyn Glennie
2016	Hello Goodbye	John McCusker
2016	Doolin'	Doolin'
2016	The Seven Suns	John McSherry
2016	The Pound Ridge Sessions	Kevin Burke & John Brennan
2017	Alterum	Julie Fowlis
2017	Pretty Little Troubles	Malcolm Holcombe
2017	Searbh Siúcra	Éilís Crean
2017	Pretty Peg	Sam Kelly & The Lost Boys
2017	Celtic Colours Live, Vol. 5	Various
2017	Happy 2017 from Tim Edey!	Tim Edey
2017	Hebrides - Islands on the Edge Soundtrack	Various
2018	Cavalier	Eddi Reader
2018	Folk Fever	The Band of Love
2018	The Art of Forgetting	Kyle Carey
2018	Banjophony	Damien O'Kane & Ron Block
2018	Basque Selfie	Korrontzi
2018	Love Is The Bridge Between Two Hearts	Heidi Talbot & John McCusker
2019	Quarehawk	Michael Walsh
2019	La Lluz Encesa	Llan de Cubel
2019	Inversions	Belinda O'Hooley
2020	The Path of Stones	John Doyle
2020	Simply Whistle	Pat Walsh
2020	Glackanacker	The Black Brothers
2020	When I Wait For You	Dirk Powell
2020	Earthbound	Starless
2021	Songs for the Sparrows	Nefesh Mountain
2021	Blue Shaman	Abaji
2021	I Got Rhythm	Tim Edey
2021	The Wishing Tree	Sam Kelly & The Lost Boys
2021	Flook/McGoldrick Remixes	Zazim
2021	Searbh Siúcra / Bitter Sweet	Eilis Crean
2022	Autumn	Laura Auer
2022	Our Voices Echo	Rura
2022	Women of the World	Chris While & Julie Matthews
2022	Now and the Evermore	Colin Hay
2022	Michael McGoldrick - Honesty Bar [Rua Soul Remix]	Rua Soul
2022	I AM WOMAN	Zazie
2022	Banjophonics	Damien O'Kane & Ron Block
2023	The Best of John McCusker	John McCusker
2023	Is It?	Ben Howard
2023	Palm Bay Frost	Palm Bay Frost
2023	Ozark Symphony	Kelly Hunt
2023	Korrontzi 20	Korrontzi
2023	Live from Celtic Connections 2023	Transatlantic Sessions
2023	This is Something Constant	Jack Rutter
2023	If Tomorrow	Steph Geremia
2024	Live from Celtic Connections 2024	Transatlantic Sessions
2024	Songs of Clear Light	Boris Grebenshchikov
2024	Returning Home	Starless
2024	Andenes Del Tiempo	Vicente Amigo
2024	Oceania	Anya Hinkle
2024	Went To Walk	Claudia Schwab
2024	Coming Home	Cara Dillon
2024	Meanwhile	Eric Clapton
2024	Littoral	Leonard Barry
2025	Trip to Herves Set (Single)	Liam O'Connor
2025	Give Me A Day	Louise Rogan
2025	Gatherings	John Smith
2025	Evening Star	Alison Brown & Steve Martin
2026	Lighthousekeeping	West of Eden
2026	Live from Glasgow Royal Concert Hall Celtic Connections 2026	Transatlantic Sessions: Jerry Douglas, Aly Bain, & Various
2026	Rule of Three	Maura Shawn Scanlin
2026	Good Times	Lukas Graham
