= Live from Leeds =

Video by Kate Rusby, The Kate Rusby Band
- Released: 2003
- Genre: Folk
- Length: 158 minutes
- Label: Pure Records
- Director: Janet Fraser Crook
- Producer: Mike Kaufman, John Leonard, John McCusker

Live from Leeds is a live concert DVD by English Folk musician Kate Rusby, released in 2003. The concert was filmed at the Leeds City Varieties.

== Track listing ==
All songs performed by Kate Rusby and/or the Kate Rusby Band

1. "Fairest of all Yarrow" from Sleepless
2. "Polly" from Underneath the Stars
3. "Cruel" from Underneath the Stars
4. "I Courted a Sailor" from Little Lights
5. "The Yorkshire Couple" Not on any Kate Rusby albums
6. "The White Cockade" from Underneath the Stars
7. "Tunes" The Kate Rusby band only
8. "The Goodman" from Underneath the Stars
9. "Who Will Sing Me Lullabies?" from Little Lights
10. "The Cobbler's Daughter" from Sleepless
11. "Let Me Be" from Underneath the Stars
12. "Withered and Died" from Little Lights
13. "Sir Eglamore" from Hourglass
14. "Canaan's Land" from Little Lights
15. "William and Davy" from Little Lights
16. "Underneath the Stars" from Underneath the Stars

== Extras ==
1. Video Diary
2. Acoustic Session
3. Interviews including Andy Kershaw
4. Biographies
5. Behind the Scenes Footage
6. 5.1 Surround Sound Mix
