= Ian Carr (guitarist) =

English guitarist and record producer

- Genres: Celtic music, English folk music, fusion, Northumbrian folk music, Scandinavian folk music, world music
- Occupation(s): Guitarist, record producer
- Years active: 1987–present
- Labels: Various
- Website: www.iancarrguitar.com

Ian Carr is an English guitarist and record producer from Cumbria, who has performed with Swåp and The Kate Rusby Band.

He learned to play mouth organ at the age of three before going on to learn piano, piano accordion and rock guitar at the age of 13, since when he has developed his highly original style of accompaniment. He cites one of his many influences as Peerie Willie Johnson.

Until the late 1990s, Carr was a part of The Kathryn Tickell Band. He plays a Collings acoustic guitar in both standard and dropped-D tunings.

== Selected discography ==
=== Solo ===
- Who He? - Ian Carr & The Various Artists (2013) Dalakollektivet Receords/ Reveal
- I Like Your Taste In Music -Ian Carr & The Various Artists (2020) Dalakollektivet Records

=== With others ===
- Syncopace – Syncopace (1990) Black Crow Records CRO CD 226
- Hootz! - Ian Carr and Simon Thoumire (1990) Black Crow Records CRO CD 225
- The Kathryn Tickell Band – The Kathryn Tickell Band (1991) Black Crow Records CRO CD 227
- Signs – The Kathryn Tickell Band (1993) Black Crow Records CRO CD 230
- Shhh – Ian Carr & Karen Tweed (1995) Hypertension HYCD 200 147
- New Directions In The Old - Roy Bailey (1997) Fuse
- Fyace – Ian Carr & Karen Tweed (1997) Fyasco FYASCD001
- The Gathering – The Kathryn Tickell Band (1997) Park Records PRKCD39
- SWÅP – Swåp (1997) Amigo AMCD735
- Hourglass – Kate Rusby (1997) Pure Records PRCD02
- The Northumberland Collection – Kathryn Tickell and friends (1998) Park Records PRKCD42
- Cowsong – Kate Rusby (1998) Pure Records PRCD04
- [Sic] – Swåp (1999) NorthSide NSD6042
- Half As Happy As We – The Two Duos Quartet (1999) Ruf Records RUFCD07
- Knock John – Chris Wood and Andy Cutting (1999) Ruf Records RUFCD08
- Sleepless – Kate Rusby (1999) Pure Records PRCD06
- Little Lights – Kate Rusby (2001) Pure Records PRCD07
- Mosquito Hunter – Swåp (2002) Amigo AMCD750
- One Roof Under – Andy Cutting & Karen Tweed (2002) Fyasco records FYC004
- Faerd – Faerd (2002) Tutl SHD55
- Heartlands – Kate Rusby and John McCusker (2003) Pure Records PRCD11
- Underneath the Stars – Kate Rusby (2003) Pure Records PRCD12
- Sings the Songs of Robert Burns - Eddi Reader (2003 ) Rough Trade RTRADCDX097
- Step on it! – Ian Carr & Niklas Roswall (2003) Drone Music AB DROCD035
- Du Da – Swåp (2005) NorthSide NSD6085
- Black Water - Kris Drever (2006) Reveal Records REVEAL12P
- Timber! - Maria Jonsson, Ian Carr and Mikael Marin (2007) Nordic Tradition NTCD09
- Peacetime - Eddi Reader ( 2007) Rough Trade RTRADCD233
- Awkward Annie – Kate Rusby (2007) Pure Records PRCD23
- Sweet Bells - Kate Rusby (2008) Pure Records PRCD28
- Before the Ruin - Drever, McCusker & Woomble (2008) Navigator Records NAVIGATOR1
- Hold Your Horses — Ella Edmondson (2009) Monsoon MONMUCD001
- Mark the Hard Earth - Kris Drever (2010) Navigator Records NAVIGATOR30
- Levande - Sofia Karlsson (2011)
- Tänk Om - Imagine If - Sandén-Nygårds-Carr (2012) Westpark Music
- He Thinks He`s Invisible - Ian Carr and Simon Thoumire (2013) Foot Stomping'
- Angels Without Wings - Heidi Talbot (2013) Compass Records
- Vagabond - Eddi Reader (2014) Reveal Records
- Regnet Faller Utan Oss - Sofia Karlsson (2014)
- If Wishes Were Horses - Kris Drever (2016) Reveal Records
- Natt blir dag - Sandén Nygårds Carr (2016) Dalakollektivet Records
- Time Flies Carr & Roswall- (2018) Dalakollektivet Records
- Where The World Is Thin-Kris Drever-(2020) Reveal Records
