= Jam & Jerusalem =

BBC television situation comedy

- Still frame from the title sequence of Jam & Jerusalem
- Also known as: Clatterford
- Genre: Sitcom
- Created by: Jennifer Saunders
- Written by: Jennifer Saunders; Abigail Wilson
- Starring: Sue Johnston; Dawn French; Jennifer Saunders; Joanna Lumley; Patrick Barlow; Maggie Steed; Sally Phillips
- Theme music composer: The Kinks
- Opening theme: "The Village Green Preservation Society" by Kate Rusby
- Composers: Kate Rusby; John McCusker
- Country of origin: United Kingdom
- No. of series: 3
- No. of episodes: 19

Production
- Running time: 17x30 minutes 2x40 minutes

Original release
- Network: BBC One
- Release: 24 November 2006 – 23 August 2009

Jam & Jerusalem (also known as Clatterford in the United States) is a British sitcom that aired on BBC One from 2006 to 2009. Written by Jennifer Saunders and Abigail Wilson, it starred Sue Johnston, with an ensemble cast including Sally Phillips, Jennifer Saunders, Dawn French, Rosie Cavaliero, Patrick Barlow, Joanna Lumley, Maggie Steed, Pauline McLynn, Suzy Aitchison, David Mitchell, Salima Saxton, and Doreen Mantle.

The show centred on a Women's Guild in a fictional small West Country town called Clatterford St. Mary. It first aired on 24 November 2006, and the second series began airing on 1 January 2008 with a 40-minute special, finishing on 1 February 2008. The third series was aired as three one-hour specials, and began its broadcast on BBC One on 9 August 2009.

== Plot ==
Jam & Jerusalem is set in the small West Country town of Clatterford St. Mary and is based around Sal, a local practice nurse. The surgery's indiscreet Irish receptionist, Tip, is also her best friend, and both are at the centre of community life. Despite this, Sal is not a member of her local Women's Guild, but after the death of her husband, the local GP, and the loss of her job, she soon joins. Tip is married to a farmer, Colin. The chairwoman of the Women's Guild is Eileen Pike, who always wears her chains of office. Other members include lollipop lady Queenie, elderly church organist Delilah Stagg, and Rosie, a factory worker and cleaner who has an angry and rude alter ego called Margaret. Delilah is absent from the second series except a brief appearance in the first episode. Wealthy Caroline and Susie are slightly separate from the rest of the Guild. Sal's family consists of James, her son, and his wife, Yasmeen. Sal's daughter, Tash, has a son of her own, Raph, and she has a boyfriend Marcus until the end of the second series. Tash's friend Samuel "Spike" Pike, a postman, is a fellow hippie who becomes her husband in the final episode of Series Two.

== Production ==
The first episode of Jam & Jerusalem was recorded in Autumn 2005 as a pilot (not broadcast at the time) and led to the BBC commissioning the rest of the six-part series and a Christmas special, which were filmed in Autumn 2006. The second series was filmed in Autumn 2007, and the third beginning in April 2009. The show was filmed in North Tawton, Devon, on nearby Dartmoor, and in Staines. The first two series were a co-production of the BBC and Saunders & French Productions in association with BBC America; the third was solely a BBC production.

Saunders, who had moved to Devon in 1999, created the show out of frustration at stereotypical portrayals of Devonians on television, as well as a desire to work with Johnston. Saunders wrote the pilot alone, but co-wrote the rest of the show with her longtime personal assistant, Abigail "Abi" Wilson. Wilson was credited for "additional material" for episodes 2–6, then credited alongside Saunders beginning with the Christmas special.

The programme was one of a group of shows recorded in the then-new High-Definition format for a trial run in November 2006 on the BBC. The theme tune is a cover of The Kinks' "The Village Green Preservation Society" performed by Kate Rusby, whose songs are also used as incidental music, and who wrote the show's score with her longtime collaborator John McCusker. Jam & Jerusalem has no laugh track and is not recorded before a studio audience. The title phrase has traditionally been associated with the Women's Institute in England and Wales, which is popularly supposed to devote much time to the making of jam, and for whom the hymn "Jerusalem" is an unofficial anthem.

Saunders' real life daughters, Ella, Beattie, and Freya Edmondson, all appear in the show: Ella plays a folk singer, whilst Beattie and Freya appear as the daughters of Saunders' character, Caroline, also respectively named Beattie and Freya.

In November 2009, Pauline McLynn announced on her blog that Jam & Jerusalem would not be returning for a fourth series. She later stated that it was the decision of the BBC and not Jennifer Saunders. Saunders later lamented the show's cancellation despite its improving ratings, noting that the cast had offered to take pay cuts for a fourth series, and attributed the cancellation to "some twat in a meeting".

== Cast ==
Regular characters

Actor	Character	Episodes		
Actor	Character	Series One	Series Two	Series Three
Sue Johnston	Sal Vine	All episodes	All episodes	All episodes
Dawn French	Rosie Bales	All episodes	All episodes	All episodes
Jennifer Saunders	Caroline Martin	All episodes	All episodes	All episodes
Joanna Lumley	Delilah Stagg	1–4, Special	1	No appearance
Doreen Mantle	Queenie	All episodes	1–4, 6	No appearance
Patrick Barlow	Reverend Hillary	All episodes	1, 3-6	1-4
Maggie Steed	Eileen Pike	All episodes	All episodes	All episodes
Pauline McLynn	Tip Haddem	All episodes	All episodes	1, 2, 5, 6
Sally Phillips	Natasha 'Tash' Vine	1–4, 6, Special	All episodes	All episodes
Suzy Aitchison	Susie	All episodes	All episodes	3-6
David Mitchell	Dr. James Vine	1, 2, 4, Special	1, 4, 5, 6	1, 2, 5, 6
Salima Saxton	Yasmeen Vine	1, 2, 4, 5, Special	1, 2, 4-6	1–3, 5,6
Rosie Cavaliero	Kate Bales	All episodes	All episodes	1, 3-6
Menna Trussler	Megan Boyd	1, 2, 6	1, 2, 4, 6	5
Thomas Assafuah	Raph	1–4, Special	6	1, 3-6
Hazel John	Pauline	All episodes	1, 3, 4	All episodes
Robbie Richardson	Colin Haddem	2, 3, 6, Special	1, 2, 4-6	No appearance
Nigel Lindsay	Marcus	2–4, Special	1-5	No appearance
Simon Farnaby	Samuel 'Spike' Pike	3, 5, 6, Special	All episodes	1, 2, 5, 6
Freya Edmondson	Freya Martin	1, 3, 5, Special	1, 2, 4	No appearance
Elanor Grimes	Janine	5, 6, Special	1, 2, 4-6	3, 4
Clive Russell	Jock	No appearance	No appearance	All episodes

Recurring and guest characters

Actor	Character	Episodes
Hywel Bennett	Dr. Mike Vine	Series One: 1
Ella Edmondson	Folk singer	Series One: 3
Wendy Hill	Mrs Otterley	Series One: 3; Series Two: 1, 2
Miriam Margolyes	Joyce Midge	Series One: 4
Natalie Grady	Mary Webb	Series One: 4
Marcia Warren	Lady Anne Crump	Series One: 5; Series Two: 3
Brian Knight	Elijah Truelove	Series One: 5
The Magic Numbers	Themselves	Series Two: 2
Beattie Edmondson	Beattie Martin	Series Two: 1, 2
Helen Blatch	Ida Helston	Series Two: 1
Sue Vincent	Ida's daughter	Series Two: 1
Jan Hartley	Veronica	Series Two: 3, 4
Adrian McLoughlin	Will, cheese factory supervisor	Series Two: 4
Dan Mersh	Community support officer	Series Two: 4
Alex Kirk	Policeman	Series Two: 4
Alexis Bowater	Newsreader	Series Two: 4
Simon Saunders	Landlord	Series Two: 4
Chris Stanton	Tim	Series Two: 5
Patricia Potter	Amy	Series Two: 6
Patricia Potter	Tish	Series Three: 5
Barbara Horne	Registrar	Series Two: 6
Ben Chamberlain	Ben	Series Two: 6
Kate Rusby and her band	Themselves	Series Two: 6
Tim Vine	Tim, the local MP	Series Three: 2
Alex Roe	Chris	Series Three: 3
Charles Dance	Himself	Series Three: 6

== Characters ==
Sal Vine
Sal (Sue Johnston) is practice nurse at the Clatterford Health Centre. She is mother to James and Tash, and widow of Mike. After the death of her husband, James takes over the surgery and replaces Sal with his wife, Yasmeen. Sal subsequently joins the Women's Guild to give herself something to do. Her best friend Tip helps her get her old job back by bringing in James' old headmistress Joyce Midge for a smear test. Overwhelmed with embarrassment, James accepts Sal back part-time on her old wage. As the practise nurse, Sal is responsible for Rosie's well being, and is sympathetic towards her condition. She usually steps to defuse the situations caused by Rosie and Margaret's antics, maintaining that she is no danger to anyone. In the Christmas Special, it is revealed that Sal had still not scattered Mike's ashes, and she asks Spike to send them up over the town in a firework. This is not quite done to plan, as the firework is instead used to end the pantomime that Sal helped produce, cast and choreograph, and the ashes end up scattered over the audience and the cast. In the third series, Sal is dismayed to find that her privacy is being invaded by builders and bulldozers, as a residence for esteemed actor Charles Dance (ostensibly) was to be built behind her house. In addition, she begins seeing older patients at her house, which leads to accusations of her being a prostitute. Sal's attitude to the builder (Jock, played by Clive Russell) subsequently thaws, and in the last episode they are seen to share a kiss.
Tip Haddem
Tip (Pauline McLynn) is an Irish woman, who worked as the receptionist at the health centre for the first two series. She is married to Colin, who owns a farm. She is best friends with Sal, and helps her in many situations, such as getting James to rehire her. She is very indiscreet, and often reveals people's personal medical information gleaned from patient files. Tip joins the Guild with Sal despite being Catholic; she was apparently brought up in a convent in Ireland, and loved it, saying she would not hear a word said against the nuns there. In the Christmas special, Tip is cast as the Wicked Stepmother, but, as in previous years, spends most of the panto at the pub, arriving drunk for the finale. In the second series, her marriage to Colin is deteriorating. In the last episode, he sleeps in a caravan outside the house, and the two communicate by writing to each other on the back of an envelope. By the end of the episode, however, their marriage seems to be back on track. Tip takes a job as bartender at the Fountain pub in series 2; in series 3, she is regularly seen there, having left the health centre. Throughout series 3, she is a supporter of Sal's protest against the building behind her house.
Rosie Bales
Rosie (Dawn French) is a sweet, if naïve, woman with an alter ego called Margaret, who is angry, rude and hateful towards anyone and everyone. Rosie has at least two sons, and an husband called Ricky, all of them unseen. Rosie works at the local cheese factory, and often presents cheese as presents for things such as luck, remembrance and welcoming. She has numerous adventures and incidents during the series, such as forgetting to order pasties for a picnic, finding a potato with Jesus' face on it, going on a celebrity diet (and subsequently swallowing a marigold glove because she couldn't find a balloon), stealing from the Spar, and getting the Guild bowls team disqualified for indecent exposure. Rosie is implied to be intellectually disabled as well as having dissociative identity disorder, the latter of which seems to stem from a bad experience (implied to be sexual abuse) as a child with a man called Peter. In the Christmas special, Rosie borrows decorations from around the town to make her costume for the pantomime, in which she plays the Fairy Godmother.
Delilah Stagg
Delilah (Joanna Lumley) is the elderly church organist, and often gets herself into problematic situations. These include getting jammed in her car, taking a day to put her donkey called Hetty on a lead, nearly choking on her false teeth, and trying to buy a tomato, during which the shopkeeper gave her 10p to go away. At the subsequent bring-and-buy, she is influenced by the shopkeeper's actions and ended up giving away all of the profits. Delilah once reveals that her family were Nazis; on one occasion, she is seen in a photograph shaking hands with Hitler, who she says had more charisma than anyone she had ever met, apart from Lester Pigott. In the Christmas Special, Delilah comes to audition before anyone else had arrived, then leaves as soon as Eileen, Queenie and Pauline arrived to hold the auditions. She always says a simple sharp "Goodbye" when leaving. In the pub, she offers youths drinks before leaving them to pay the tab. Delilah has a bad cycling accident in the first episode of the second series and does not return.
Eileen Pike (née Brewer)
Eileen (Maggie Steed) is self-proclaimed chairwoman of the Women's Guild, and proudly marks her position with some handmade "regalia", which Rosie insists are medals or armour of some sort. Eileen has a haughty personality and a superiority complex. She is revealed to be adopted in the first series when she takes her adoptive father to a hospice. Sal and Tip use Genes Reunited to find that she had a brother, in whom at first she has no interest, but after consideration contacts, learning she also has nieces and nephews. Eileen is very sympathetic towards Rosie's condition, and assists Sal in reprimanding the Vicar after he is less than sensitive towards Rosie. However, she is not as adept at dealing with it as Sal, as she is frightened by Margaret. Eileen helps cast, produce and choreograph the pantomime in the Christmas special with Queenie and Sal. In the third series, Eileen agrees to help with Sal's protest against the development behind Sal's house until she finds out that the person moving into the development is apparently Charles Dance. She regularly suffers from hot flushes, and always orders a Bénédictine at the pub.
Caroline Martin
Caroline (Jennifer Saunders) is a wealthy mother of four: Mikey, who is in a rock band; Christopher, who is in the army; and two daughters, Beattie and Freya. She is married to a man called John. She enjoys horse-riding, and does not understand why Freya does not show the same enthusiasm. Caroline often spends time with the various celebrities that her son Mikey knows, particularly Sting and Trudie Styler. While a prominent member of the Guild, she and Susie seem separate from it, keeping their own company. Caroline often mistakes words such as dogging and rimming to mean something completely different from what they actually mean, like taking dogs to the river to swim, and wetting the rim of a glass and making a tune (respectively). It is Susie who divulges their true meanings, to which Caroline expresses deep shock. In the Christmas Special, Caroline helps backstage with make-up and general organisation. In the third series, she initially supports Sal in her protest, but changes her mind after learning that the development will bring Charles Dance to Clatterford. Saunders deliberately chose to play a character with little screen time in Jam & Jerusalem, stating she preferred to write, sit back and watch, though the third episode of series three is centred around Caroline.
Dr. James Vine
James (David Mitchell) is Sal's elder child, who inherits the practice after the death of his father, Mike. He is married to Yasmeen, who takes Sal's job as practice nurse, despite Yasmeen being horrifically squeamish. James is uptight and often has difficulty connecting with patients. He dislikes his mother's interference in his work, and often harshly reminds her she is no longer employed at the practise. After Sal helps James deal with an embarrassing smear test of his old headmistress, he brings her back part-time. In the Christmas special, he takes his deceased father's place in the Clatterford Christmas Panto and plays an Ugly Sister in Cinderella. His relationship with his sister Tash is very negative, yet he expresses his love for her wedding, at which he speaks on behalf of their deceased father. In the third series, he believes a rumour that his mother was a prostitute, and also expressed interest in becoming Clatterford's local MP. He shows that he has emotionally matured when he approves of the relationship between his mother and Jock.
Natasha "Tash" Vine
Born in 1971, Tash (Sally Phillips) is Sal's younger child, who is a hippy. She has a son from an unknown relationship, called Raph. Her selfish and irresponsible behaviour causes frequent disputes between her and her mother, and extremely barbed exchanges with her brother. In the first series, she is in a relationship with a man called Rufus, who then leaves her. A recurring theme throughout the show is Sal's frustration with her inability and refusal to settle down and care for Raph; Mike once kicked her out of the house in the hope the reality of life would shock her into action, but she carried on as before. She plays the lead role in the Christmas pantomime (for the 21st time running, despite being 36 at the time), and subsequently starts a relationship with an old school friend called Marcus. She eventually leaves him in the second series, and marries his rival for her affections, fellow hippy Spike. In the third series, she, Spike and Raph are all living in the old portable library outside Sal's house, which is then removed by force, partly because they refused to move it themselves, but mostly because the battery in the engine was dead. When they finally repair and move the van, Sal is concerned she will not take her responsibilities as Raph's mother seriously, but her first decision is to arrange a van-warming party for him, in the hope he will feel at home.
Queenie
Queenie (Doreen Mantle) is verger at the church and local lollipop lady, despite there being hardly any traffic in Clatterford. She is seemingly second-in-command to Eileen in the Guild. In the first series, it is mentioned that she has a daughter called Gaye, who coincidentally is a lesbian. In the Christmas special, she is director of the pantomime, but often falls asleep during rehearsals, and seems more interested in eating biscuits. In the second series, she has her arm in a sling, changing arms sometimes. Queenie is absent from the third series, having moved in with her sister.
Yasmeen Vine
Yasmeen (Salima Saxton) is wife to James, and becomes practice nurse after he inherits the practice, putting Sal, her mother-in-law, out of a job. She is terrible at her job due to being extremely mysophobic and squeamish, unable to even say "smear". She is accomplished in netball and tries to teach the Guild how to play, despite coming to blows with Susie over who is the better player. Owing to her infrequent visits to Sal's home, Sal and Tash often assume that Yasmeen is pregnant whenever she turns up. Yasmeen is Muslim.
The Vicar / Hillary
Hillary (Patrick Barlow) is the fussy, old-fashioned and grumpy vicar at the local church. He has difficulty suffering the eccentric townsfolk of Clatterford, saying that "being vicar around here is like ploughing bloody concrete". In the second series, he has a girlfriend called Veronica, who reveals his first name to be Hillary, to which the Guild all respond with laughter. His attempts to make himself look dignified in front of his parish almost invariably end badly. The Vicar is opposed to plans that might damage the community, such as the cancellation of the re-enactment of the Clatterford Skirmish, and the building of Charles Dance's residence behind Sal's house.
Kate Bales
Kate (Rosie Cavaliero), called "Katie" by Eileen and occasionally others, is a self-pitying, lonely and irritating young widow. She is initially disliked by the majority of Clatterford, once described by Eileen as having "the charisma of a flip-flop". Her husband died shortly after they got married, and she is still wallowing in grief after five years. She became a bereavement counsellor but often ends up being counselled by those she is trying to help. She holds several other jobs as well: as a teacher in series one, a real estate agent in series two, and a community support officer in series three. Despite being an atheist, she joins the Guild to try to come out of mourning. In the Christmas special, she almost inaudibly sings "Nine Million Bicycles" at her audition, but subsequently admits that she does not want to be on stage and so is enlisted to be a ticket saleswoman. Kate is also the guild's computer wizard, despite a lack of real expertise. She runs a class for older people who wanted to learn to use a computer, called the "Silver Surfers". In the third series, Kate and the Vicar have a whirlwind romance after Kate supports him during his emotional crisis over the safety of Caroline's soldier son.
Susie
Susie (Suzy Aitchison) is a wealthy friend of Caroline's and a Guild member, and is married to a man called Charles. She often mistakes Caroline's son Mikey for being in a pop band rather than a rock band. She is very competitive, especially about playing centre in netball. In the Christmas special, she wants and expects to be cast as Prince Charming, but is recast as Dandini when her performance opposite Tash makes Eileen and Sal uncomfortable. She goes to Sal for advice when she had a pregnancy scare in the second series. She acts as something of a dogsbody to Caroline on many occasions, and often has to inform her of the real meaning of slang terms.
Jock
Jock (Clive Russell) is a Scottish builder who renovates the barn behind Sal's house in the third series. Sal discovers the planning application too late (Tash saw it but ignored it), and takes her ire out on Jock. Jock, having an abrasive, no-nonsense personality, ignores all protests. Rosie, on speaking to Jock, gets the mistaken idea that the house is being built as a hideaway residence for Charles Dance. The thought of a celebrity in the village removes local opposition to the build, leaving Sal without support. Jock, over time, becomes friendly with Sal, eventually becoming her love interest. When it dawns on Sal and Tip that Charles Dance will not be appearing at the local Ladies meeting, it is Jock who saves the day.

== Episodes ==
Series	Episodes	Originally released	
Series	Episodes	First released	Last released
1	6	24 November 2006	26 December 2006
Special		30 December 2006	
2	6	1 January 2008	1 February 2008
3	6	9 August 2009	23 August 2009

=== Series 1 (2006) ===
No. overall	No. in series	Title	Directed by	Written by	Original release date	UK viewers (millions)
1	1	"Sudden Death"	Steve Bendelack	Jennifer Saunders, Abigail Wilson	24 November 2006	6.86
Dr Michael Vine (Hywel Bennett) dies of a heart attack, and at the funeral his son Dr. James announces that his wife will be the new practice nurse, putting his mother Sal out of a job. She then struggles to occupy her time, so joins the local Women's Guild, as does Kate Bales, a bereavement counsellor. Featured song: Kate Rusby – "No Names"
2	2	"Tea Room"	Mandie Fletcher	Jennifer Saunders, Abigail Wilson	1 December 2006	4.25
The women decide they want a coffee room at the local church so they have somewhere to meet up after the morning's service. To pay for the health and safety standards, they decide to put together a bring-and-buy sale to raise money. Sal finally gets rid of her deceased husband's clothes, donating them to the fundraiser; as her children are unwilling to help, the Guild decide they will.
3	3	"Beating the Bounds"	Mandie Fletcher	Jennifer Saunders	8 December 2006	5.38
After discovering Eileen was adopted, Sal convinces Tip to use Genes Reunited to search for her birth family. The women are shocked to immediately find the contact details of a blood relative. Although initially angry, Eileen is happy when she discovers she has a brother. Tash asks Sal to take care of Raph for six months, and Sal refuses. Rosie forgets to order the pasties for a village picnic, so the Guild have to make them themselves.
4	4	"Problem Daughter"	Mandie Fletcher	Jennifer Saunders, Abigail Wilson	15 December 2006	4.00
Delilah gets her car seat stuck. Sal and Tash have a major argument about Tash wanting to do a Circus Skills course, and refusing to get a job. However, they later make up. At the surgery, Tip devises a successful plan to get Sal her old job back, by having James' ex-headmistress Joyce Midge (Miriam Margolyes) come in for a smear. Featured song: Kate Rusby – "The Lark"
5	5	"Holy Potato"	Mandie Fletcher	Jennifer Saunders, Abigail Wilson	22 December 2006	<4.39
Rosie, Eileen and Queenie help the Vicar prepare for the harvest festival. When Rosie sees the face of Jesus in a potato, her alter-ego Margaret comes to the surface after the Vicar tells her the face is not there. Meanwhile, the Vicar tries to get some peace and Caroline injures herself at the pony trials.
6	6	"Inspection"	Mandie Fletcher	Jennifer Saunders, Abigail Wilson	26 December 2006	4.80
During Kate's "Silver Surfers" group, Eileen comes in and reads a letter saying that Guild inspector Lady Anne Crump (Marcia Warren) will be at their meeting that evening, which makes Eileen panic thinking they will be closed. Meanwhile, the Guild help an old man called Elijah whose wife recently died, and Rosie goes on a celebrity diet. Featured song: Kate Rusby – "Underneath the Stars"
7	-	"Christmas Panto"	Mandie Fletcher	Jennifer Saunders	30 December 2006	4.50
The Guild are organising Cinderella, the village pantomime, and Tash wants to play the lead role as she always does. However, Eileen thinks that, at 36, Tash is too old. Nevertheless, Sal persuades Eileen to let Tash have the role, while James and the Vicar play the Ugly sisters. On the night, Tip goes to the pub rather than perform as the Wicked Stepmother, while Tash gets on well with Prince Charming. Meanwhile, Sal gets help when she decides how to scatter Mike's ashes. Featured songs: Dawn French – "The Shoop Shoop Song (It's in His Kiss)"; Rosie Cavaliero – "Nine Million Bicycles"; Suzy Aitchison and Nigel Lindsay – "If You're Not the One"; Sally Phillips – "All by Myself"; Sally Phillips and Nigel Lindsay – "My Heart Will Go On"; Pantomime cast – "Sailing"

=== Series 2 (2008) ===
No. overall	No. in series	Title	Directed by	Written by	Original release date	UK viewers (millions)
8	1	"Website"	Mandie Fletcher	Jennifer Saunders, Abigail Wilson	1 January 2008	2.90
As the first anniversary of Mike's death approaches, Sal tells James how much she misses him. Sal teaches James how to be compassionate with his patients and Tash gets a job in tele-sales. Meanwhile, the Guild launch a website and hold a Victorian tea so they can put the some photos on the website. However, Kate and Eileen argue over who will make the website. Delilah flies off her bike and is rushed to hospital.
9	2	"Festival"	Mandie Fletcher	Jennifer Saunders, Abigail Wilson	4 January 2008	4.80
Tash and Spike plan to go to Glastonbury, but a ticketless Tash hopes to get past security by pretending to be a security guard. Caroline is also at Glastonbury to see her son perform. Meanwhile, Sal wants a quiet weekend to herself, but Susie comes round saying she thinks she is pregnant after having an affair. However, after looking at the medical records Tip soon tells Susie she can not be pregnant as the man she had the affair with has had a vasectomy. Sal's quiet weekend is then ruined further when Tash and Spike come back from Glastonbury early after Tash failed to get past security.
10	3	"Rambling"	Mandie Fletcher	Jennifer Saunders, Abigail Wilson	11 January 2008	3.00
Lady Anne Crump (Marcia Warren) visits the Guild to judge their competitions. Sal organises the Guild's ramble, which to Eileen's dismay has no plan or theme, instead Sal says they should spend the time talking and bonding. During the ramble, they by accident meet the Vicar, who is having a picnic with a woman called Veronica (Jan Hartley). The Guild then get stranded in fog. Also, Sal encourages Spike to ask Tash out, but he gets confused and asks her out instead. Tash meanwhile is protesting with her fellow druids about the Army practising on nearby land.
11	4	"Skirmish"	Mandie Fletcher	Jennifer Saunders, Abigail Wilson	18 January 2008	2.80
The annual re-enactment of the 1646 Clatterford Skirmish is cancelled by the Council citing health and safety concerns. The Guild then decide to organise it themselves, and plan many events including a minor battle reenactment, in which James plays Charles I. Meanwhile, after an incident at the factory, Rosie steals from the SPAR and has problems with Margaret, her alter-ego. She is then seen at home by James, who suggests a higher dose of medication, which Sal does not allow. Sal then talks to Margaret and appears to solve the problem, although it is some days before Rosie will leave her house. Featured song: Kylie Minogue – "Can't Get You Out of My Head"
12	5	"Match"	Mandie Fletcher	Jennifer Saunders, Abigail Wilson	25 January 2008	3.20
Yasmeen tries to teach the Guild how to successfully play netball ready for a game against the Guild of a neighbouring village, Hole. However, the Guild lose. The next match is bowls, which they nearly win until Rosie gets Clatterford disqualified for indecent exposure. Meanwhile, Tash plans to move in with Marcus. However, Spike writes her a love note telling her to meet him by a tree at 5pm. She runs away from a house viewing to meet Spike, and she accepts his proposal. Featured song: Kate Rusby – "Sweet Bride"
13	6	"Wedding"	Mandie Fletcher	Jennifer Saunders, Abigail Wilson	1 February 2008	3.40
Tash tries to organise her wedding to Spike, but soon realises that everything is too expensive. She then decides to let Sal and the Guild organise the wedding, which then takes place by a river with a fairy theme, and Tash and Spike write their own vows to say in front of the registrar. The reception takes place on a nearby field and afterwards Spike, Tash and Raph go away in a mobile home. Featured songs: Kate Rusby – "Elfin Knight", "Who Knows Where the Time Goes?"

=== Series 3 (2009) ===
No. overall	No. in series	Title	Directed by	Written by	Original release date	UK viewers (millions)
14	1	"Easter"	Mandie Fletcher	Jennifer Saunders, Abigail Wilson	9 August 2009	4.20
15	2	"Working from Home"	Mandie Fletcher	Jennifer Saunders, Abigail Wilson	9 August 2009	4.20
Sal discovers an old planning application to convert the barn in the field behind her house and, despite the fact that it is officially too late to object, she enlists the help of the Guild in an effort to stop the development. However, the Guild's support for her cause disappears when new arrival Jock, who is doing the conversion, lets Rosie believe that the barn will become a residence of Charles Dance. Featured song: Kate Rusby – "Kooks" Sal has been having older members of the community visit her house. Unusual attire and aggressive behaviour lead Jock and Eileen to suspect she is a prostitute. This means another embarrassing conversation for James, although the truth does not please him either.
16	3	"Dinner Party"	Mandie Fletcher	Jennifer Saunders, Abigail Wilson	16 August 2009	3.45
17	4	"Missing Persons"	Mandie Fletcher	Jennifer Saunders, Abigail Wilson	16 August 2009	3.45
When Caroline is planning a dinner party for husband John and his friends from London, her attempts to enlist Rosie to help lead her to mistakenly think she is being invited, resulting in an extremely awkward evening when travel troubles result in Sal, the Vicar and Susie being the only other guests at the party. Meanwhile, Jock's attempt to apologise for an unfortunate remark gives Sal yet another problem. As the ladies of Clatterford stage a fashion show, Sal and Jock begin to enjoy each other's company more. Panic ensues for Eileen and Katie when Margaret turns up to cause trouble, and the Vicar goes AWOL.
18	5	"New Beginnings"	Mandie Fletcher	Jennifer Saunders, Abigail Wilson	23 August 2009	3.97
19	6	"Ladies in Lavender"	Mandie Fletcher	Jennifer Saunders, Abigail Wilson	23 August 2009	3.97
Spike and Tash are finally ready to travel the world in their converted mobile library, but a confusion with the gears leads to a call-out for the emergency services, and Sal's house ends up looking like a war zone. Jock agrees to mend the damage, and the thawing of his previously frosty relationship with Sal continues, much to the amusement of Tip and the disgust of Tash. All bets are off when it is finally revealed that the barn is not being converted for Charles Dance at all – Jock just let Rosie jump to that conclusion to get the Guild off his back. This would be bad enough if Jock hadn't promised the Guild an appearance by Mr Dance as their next (and indeed, first) celebrity speaker.

== Other countries ==
The first series of Jam & Jerusalem was broadcast on BBC America in the United States. The first series was screened in Australia, starting in December 2007 on the ABC. In late 2007, the show began to air in Canada on BBC Canada, and in India on BBC Entertainment.

== Home media ==
The first series and 2006 Christmas Special of Jam & Jerusalem were released in the United States (Region 1) as Clatterford: Season 1, on 8 May 2007. The first series was released in the United Kingdom (Region 2) on 21 January 2008 and in Australia (Region 4) on 3 January 2008.

The Complete Series 2 was released on DVD in the UK on 3 August 2009, and 1 September 2009 in the US. The Complete Series 3 was released on DVD in the UK on 2 August 2010, alongside the Complete Series 1–3.

Series	No. of discs	Release date		
Series	No. of discs	Region 1	Region 2	Region 4
Series 1	2	8 May 2007	21 January 2008	2 January 2008
Series 2	1	1 September 2009	3 August 2009	29 June 2010
Series 3	1	7 September 2010	23 August 2010	7 July 2011
Series 1–3	4	TBA	23 August 2010	3 November 2011
