= Huskar Pit =

Former coal mine in South Yorkshire, England

Coordinates: 53°31′47.0″N 1°33′28.1″W

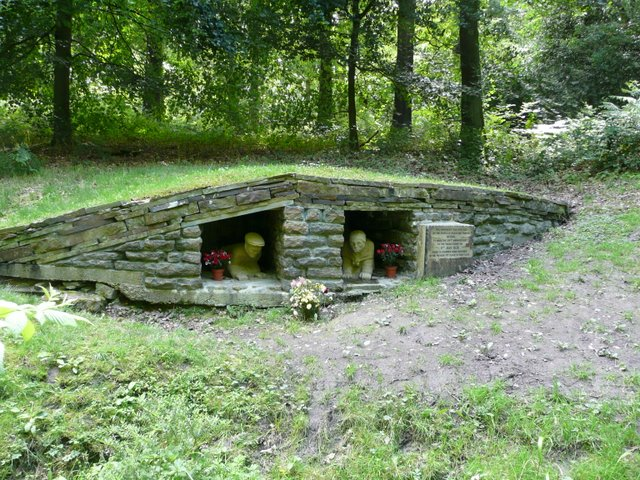
Memorial to the children who died as a result of the disaster

Huskar Pit was a coal mine on the South Yorkshire Coalfield, sunk to work the Silkstone seam. It was located in Nabs Wood, outside the village of Silkstone Common, in the then West Riding of Yorkshire. It was connected to the Barnsley Canal by the Silkstone Waggonway. Huskar was the scene of a notorious pit disaster on 4 July 1838.

== Huskar pit disaster ==
In 1838 Huskar was connected to Moorend Colliery, and used for ventilation. It had a vertical shaft to the surface and a drift shaft (known as a "dayhole") leading to Nabs Wood. On 4 July 1838 heavy rainfall struck the area, disabling the winding engine on the vertical shaft. The workers stranded at the pit bottom were instructed to remain there until they were able to be brought up to the surface, but a number of children decided to try and escape via the dayhole to Nabs Wood. A nearby stream had burst its banks in the rain and a torrent of water entered the shaft, drowning 26 children aged 7 to 17. Some were able to escape via a passage that led to Moorend and alert colliers on the surface.

== Legacy ==
The children's bodies were brought up from the pit and buried together in the churchyard of All Saints' Church, Silkstone. A memorial was erected bearing the names and ages of those who died, which today is the logo of the village's primary school. Nationwide, the disaster shocked public opinion, and the resulting inquiry led to the 1842 Mines Act which sought to introduce some protection for child miners and meant that all girls and boys under the age of ten were prohibited from working underground.

In 1988, the community of Silkstone Parish built another memorial in Nabs Wood, depicting two children at work underground. In 2008, to mark the disaster's 170th anniversary, the event and subsequent inquest were turned into a play by Sylvia le Breton and performed by the local Grass Roots theatre group in Silkstone church. In 2010, a commemorative stained glass window crafted by local residents was installed in one of its chapels.

A book by Alan Gallop about the event's history, "Children of the Dark: Life and Death Underground in Victorian England" was published in 2003 and Peter Bond wrote and performed a song, "Act of God" about the tragedy; the song is included on the 1979 album "See Me Up, See Me Down" from Highway Records.

The Kate Rusby song "Halt the Wagons", from her 2019 album Philosophers, Poets & Kings, references the tragedy from the point of view of a grieving mother.
