= Underneath the Stars =

Underneath the Stars may refer to:

- Underneath the Stars (album), album by Kate Rusby
- "Underneath the Stars" (song), song by Mariah Carey from Daydream
