= Philosophers, Poets & Kings =

Studio album by Kate Rusby
- Released: 17 May 2019
- Genre: English folk music
- Length: 51:59
- Label: Pure Records

Kate Rusby chronology
Life in a Paper Boat (2016)	Philosophers, Poets & Kings (2019)	Holly Head (2019)

Philosophers, Poets & Kings is the sixteenth studio album by English folk singer Kate Rusby. It features traditional folk music, original songs and covers of Fairport Convention and Oasis. The album was released by Pure Records, including on CD and on vinyl, on 17 May 2019. It garnered positive critical reception that praised the production and instrumentation. The final song, "Halt the Wagons", commemorates the death of 26 children in the Huskar Pit mining disaster.

== Composition ==
The album features arrangements of traditional songs, songs written by Rusby or co-written with her father, two cover songs and a remix. Colleen Taylor of The Irish Echo reviewed that the album saw Rusby return to acoustic folk after recent experimentation with electronic. It is centred around Rusby's family and home in Barnsley, Yorkshire. Tonally, it features "jaunty, comic" songs like the lead song "Jenny" as well as more emotional tracks like "Halt the Wagons".

"Bogey's Bonnie Belle" is a 20th-century Scots folk song that has been performed by Irish artists including Christy Moore and Cherish the Ladies. "Crazy Man Michael", a song by Fairport Convention, was a favourite childhood song of Rusby's. "The Squire and the Parson" was co-written by Rusby and her father many years prior to the album's release. It is based on a Barnsley legend about a drunken fight. "The Wanderer" is an original song by Rusby about a man in her community with Alzheimer's disease.

The final track, "Halt the Wagons", was written for the 180th anniversary of the Huskar Pit mining disaster in which 26 children died, following which Parliament restricted underground work to people aged at least ten years old. The song and music video featured members of the Barnsley Youth Choir in the same demographics as the victims: aged seven to seventeen, with 15 boys and 11 girls. It was first performed by Rusby's mother at a local concert to commemorate the anniversary on 5 July 2018. Rusby performed it with the backing choir at the 2018 Underneath the Stars Festival.

== Reception ==
Taylor said that it was "quickly winning the race to become my favorite Rusby album—perhaps my favorite folk album—to date". She praised that "Rusby can reinvent traditional songs better than anyone recording today", giving the example of "Bogey's Bonnie Belle", which Rusby modernises with electronic guitar and synthesisers. Taylor lauded "Halt the Wagons" as "gorgeous in its simple, subdued, yet affective brass instrument arrangement", and explained that "The Farmer's Toast" was her favourite song due to its "expert tune arrangement, joyous balladeering, and historical flare". Taylor concludes that Rusby transports the listener to the traditional village life of her music's tradition.

Neil McFayden of Folk Radio praised the album's production. For instance, on "Jenny", the "understated opening" builds to a "singalong chorus" through the "beats and brass". McFayden enjoyed the cover of "Don't Go Away", as it was performed "superbly soft, beautifully sparse, and with an edge of plaintive appeal". He summarised that the album was "impressive" as Rusby "continues to apply her exquisite voice to a meticulous selection of songs, including her own".

In Louder Than War, Mike Ainscoe positively reviewed songs such as "Until Morning", with its "exquisiteness", and "Halt the Wagons", after which "there won't be a dry eye in the house". Ainscoe called the cover songs a "surprise highlight" and said that O'Kane's guitar was "caressed with a touch so precise and sensitive that belies its potential dominance".

== Track listing ==
All tracks are written by Kate Rusby, except where noted.

Philosophers, Poets & Kings
No.	Title	Writer(s)	Length
1.	"Jenny"		4:38
2.	"Bogey's Bonnie Belle"	Damien O'Kane; Rusby	4:24
3.	"Philosophers, Poets & Kings"		4:26
4.	"Until Morning"		4:26
5.	"Crazy Man Michael"	Dave Swarbrick; Richard Thompson	4:57
6.	"Don't Go Away"	Noel Gallagher	4:13
7.	"The Squire and the Parson"		3:41
8.	"The Wanderer"		3:38
9.	"The Farmer's Toast"	O'Kane; Rusby	4:23
10.	"As the Lights Go Out"		3:46
11.	"Jenny – Ordinary Remix"		4:31
12.	"Halt the Wagons"		4:51
Total length:			51:59

== Personnel ==
Credits adapted from Folk Radio.

- Kate Rusby – vocals
- Damien O'Kane – backing vocals
- Michael McGoldrick – backing vocals
- Sam Kelly – backing vocals
- Ross Ainslie – whistling
- Chas Mackenzie – electric guitar
- Duncan Lyall – double bass, Moog
- Nick Cooke – accordion
- Josh Clark – percussion
- Gary Wyatt – cornet
- Rich Evans – flugelhorn
- Ron Block – banjo

== Charts ==
Chart performance for Philosophers, Poets & Kings
Chart (2019)	Peak position
UK Album Downloads (Official Charts)	25
UK Folk Albums (Official Charts)	17
UK Independent Albums (Official Charts)	21
