= All Hail to the Days (Drive the Cold Winter Away) =

Elizabethan Christmas carol

"All Hail to the Days", also known as "Drive the Cold Winter Away", "In Praise of Christmas", and "The Praise of Christmas", is an English Christmas carol of Elizabethan origins. The carol first appeared as a broadside in circa 1625, though its origins are unclear; Thomas d'Urfey is sometimes erroneously identified as the lyricist, including in the 1928 Oxford Book of Carols. Though obscure, the carol has featured in numerous hymnals over the centuries. It is traditionally sung to the tune "When Phoebus did rest", under which it is printed in the Pepys and Roxburgh collections and Playford’s The English Dancing Master.

The carol's lyrics discuss various seasonal festivities during Christmastide, which is directly mentioned in the verse "When Christmastide comes in like a bride…Twelve days in the year, much mirth and good cheer." During the Elizabethan era (from which the song originates), the majority of Christmas celebrations occurred during the Twelve Days of Christmas. Traditional Elizabethan Christmas festivities alluded to in the carol include wassailing, feasting, and theatre performances.

== Lyrics ==
All hail to the days that merit more praise
Than all the rest of the year,
And welcome the nights that double delights,
As well for the poor as the peer!
Good fortune attend each merry man's friend,
That doth but the best that he may;
Forgetting old wrongs, with carols and songs,
To drive the cold winter away.

'Tis ill for a mind to anger inclined
To think of small injuries now;
If wrath be to seek, do not lend her thy cheek,
Nor let her inhabit thy brow.
Cross out of thy books malevolent looks,
Both beauty and youth's decay,
And wholly consort with mirth and with sport,
To drive the cold winter away.

This time of the year is spent in good cheer,
And neighbours together do meet,
To sit by the fire, with friendly desire,
Each other in love do greet;
Old grudges forgot, are put in the pot,
All sorrows aside they lay,
The old and the young doth carol his song,
To drive the cold winter away.

To mask and to mum kind neighbours will come
With wassails of nut-brown ale,
To drink and carouse to all in the house,
As merry as bucks in the dale;
Where cake, bread and cheese is brought for your fees,
To make you the longer stay;
At the fire to warm will do you no harm,
To drive the cold winter away.

When Christmastide comes in like a bride,
With holly and ivy clad,
Twelve days in the year, much mirth and good cheer,
In every household is had;
The country guise is then to devise
Some gambols of Christmas play,
Whereat the young men do best that they can,
To drive the cold winter away.

When white-bearded frost hath threatened his worst,
And fallen from branch and brier,
Then time away calls, from husbandry halls
And from the good countryman's fire,
Together to go to plough and to sow,
To get us both food and array;
And thus with content the time we have spent
To drive the cold winter away.

== Notable recordings ==
Canadian folk artist Loreena McKennitt recorded the carol, titled "In Praise of Christmas", for her Christmas album To Drive the Cold Winter Away (1987). English folksinger Kate Rusby recorded the song under the title "Cold Winter" for her album The Frost Is All Over (2015). Rusby’s version included four of the traditional verses, which were sung to a tune that she composed.

English folktronica artists Stick in the Wheel recorded the song as “Drive the Cold Winter Away” on their 2020 album Hold Fast.

The music of the carol has also been arranged by Pascale Boquet and Martin Wheeler for the main soundtrack title of the movie Age of Uprising: The Legend of Michael Kohlhaas (2013) by French director Arnaud des Pallières.

The song was also covered by 'Owain Phyfe and The New World Renaissance Band' in 1992, in their 'Live the Legend' album.
