= The Seven Joys of Mary (carol) =

Traditional song

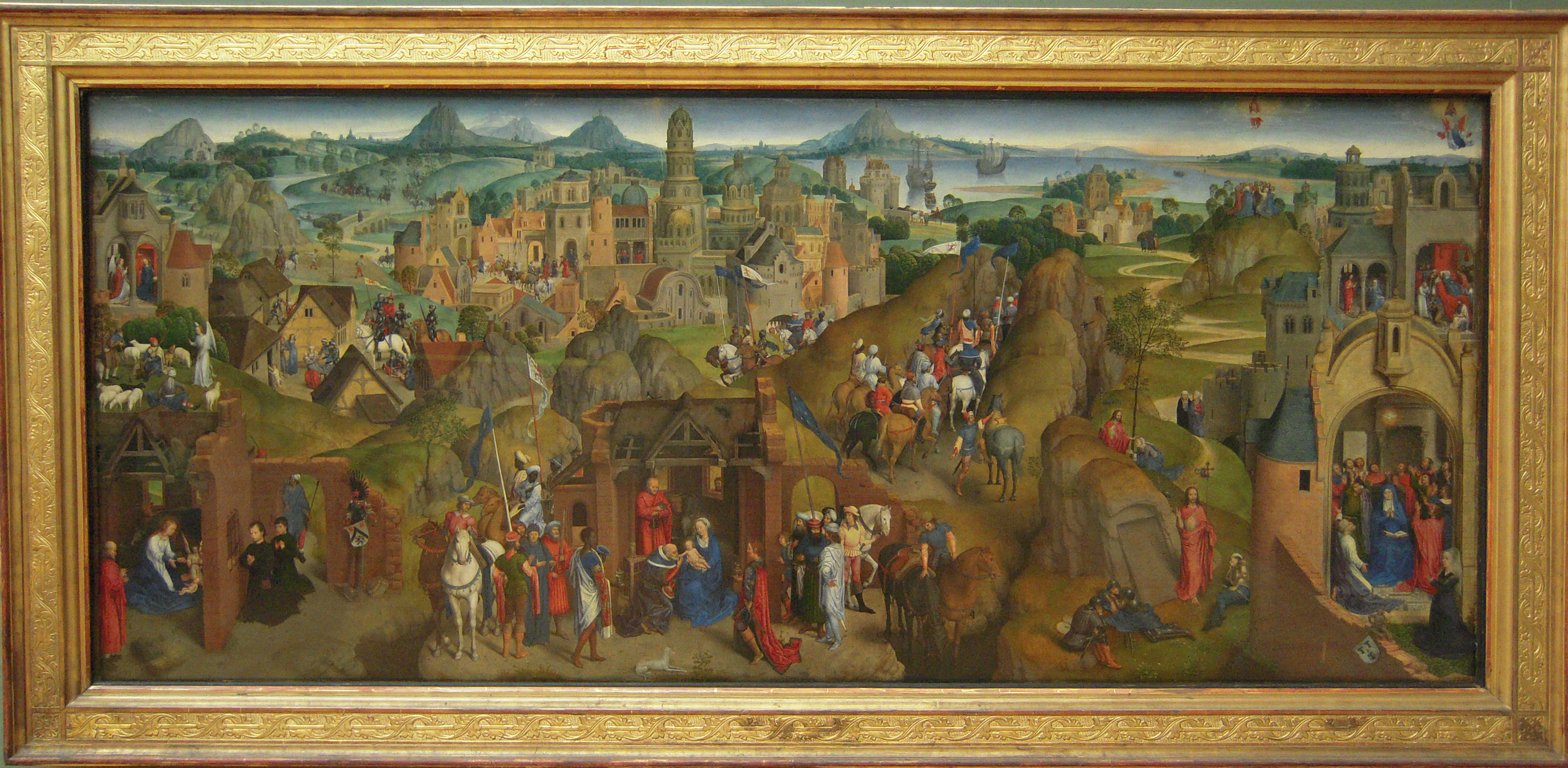
The Seven Joys of Mary (1480), Hans Memling

"The Seven Joys of Mary" (Roud # 278) is a traditional carol about Mary's happiness at moments in the life of Jesus, probably inspired by the trope of the Seven Joys of the Virgin in the devotional literature and art of Medieval Europe. Though not traditionally associated with Christmas, it has become so in the modern era.

== Versions ==
The song has English and American versions referring to different acts by Jesus that gave joy to Mary:

	English version	American version
1	Sucking at her breast	Being born
2	Curing the lame	Curing the lame
3	Curing the blind	Curing the blind
4	Raising the dead	Reading the Old Testament in the Temple
5	Bearing the cross	Raising the dead
6	Wearing the crown of Heaven	Rising from the dead
7	Writing with a golden pen	Wearing the crown of Heaven

== Tune ==
The common music is sung thus:

== Recordings ==
- The Weavers – We Wish You A Merry Christmas (1951)
- Burl Ives – Christmas Day in the Morning (1952)
- Maddy Prior and June Tabor – Silly Sisters (1976)
- Stephen Cleobury and the King's College Choir (1984, 1999)
- Kate & Anna McGarrigle – The McGarrigle Christmas Hour (2005)
- John Jacob Niles – An Evening with (remastered 2006)
- Great Big Sea – RedEye Holiday Sampler 2008
- Kate Rusby (under the title 'Seven Good Joys') – While Mortals Sleep (2011)
- Loreena McKennitt – A Midwinter Night's Dream

== See also ==
- List of Christmas carols
