= 20 (Kate Rusby album) =

Studio album by Kate Rusby
- Released: 22 October 2012
- Genre: Folk
- Length: 91.07
- Label: Pure Records
- Producer: Kate Rusby and Damien O'Kane

Kate Rusby chronology
While Mortals Sleep (2011)	20 (2012)	Ghost (2014)

20 is a studio album by English folk musician Kate Rusby, released on 22 October 2012 on Pure Records. Produced by Rusby and her husband Damien O'Kane, the album celebrates Rusby's twentieth year as a recording artist, and features re-recordings of previously released tracks each of which features guest vocals from the likes of Nic Jones, Paul Weller, Mary Chapin Carpenter, Eddi Reader, Sarah Jarosz and others.

A similar album, 10, was released in 2002.

Upon its release, the album entered the UK Album Chart at #22.

== Background and recording ==
Regarding the selection of songs included, Kate Rusby noted, "It was difficult to boil down the song selection to just twenty songs, because songs are like children, aren't they – you love them all equally! I suppose I tried to choose the songs that my fans would expect to hear when they come to see me. We decided to do new versions rather than take the easy option of compiling a 'greatest hits', and I thought it would add something extra to have artists I've admired over the years helping us out."

== Track listing ==
Disc One

1. "Awkward Annie" featuring Chris Thile - 3:36
2. "Unquiet Grave" featuring Aoife O'Donovan - 4:35
3. "Sun Grazers" featuring Paul Weller and Gregory Liszt - 3:46
4. "The Lark" featuring Nic Jones - 5:51
5. "Planets" featuring Sarah Jarosz - 3:30
6. "Wandering Soul" featuring Eddi Reader, Dick Gaughan and Ron Block - 4:40
7. "Who Will Sing Me Lullabies" featuring Richard Thompson and Philip Selway - 4:20
8. "Jolly Plough Boys" featuring Dick Gaughan - 5:36
9. "Sho Heen" featuring Eddi Reader, Jerry Douglas, Ron Block and Philip Selway - 4:19
10. "Bitter Boy" featuring Damien O'Kane - 5:11

Disc Two

1. "Baa Baa Black Sheep" - 0:27
2. "I Courted a Sailor" featuring Jim Causley - 4:42
3. "Mocking Bird" featuring Sara Watkins and Noam Pikelny - 3:26
4. "The Good Man" featuring Joe Rusby, Jerry Douglas and Chris Thile - 4:09
5. "Annan Waters" featuring Bob Fox - 5:36
6. "All God's Angels" featuring Paul Brady and Noam Pikelny - 5:15
7. "Elfin Knight" featuring Dave Burland - 3:49
8. "Wild Goose" featuring Stephen Fretwell - 5:13
9. "Home" featuring Mary Chapin Carpenter and Jim Causley - 3:51
10. "Underneath the Stars" featuring Grimethorpe Colliery Band - 3:43
11. "Bring Me a Boat" featuring Declan O'Rourke - 5:32
