= The Frost Is All Over =

Studio album by Kate Rusby
- Released: 27 November 2015
- Genre: Folk, Christmas
- Label: Pure Records

Kate Rusby chronology
| Ghost (2014) | The Frost Is All Over (2015) | Life in a Paper Boat (2016) |

The Frost Is All Over is the third Christmas album by English folk musician Kate Rusby, released on 27 November 2015 on Pure Records. Similar to Rusby's previous Christmas releases, Sweet Bells (2008) and While Mortals Sleep (2011), the album features South Yorkshire-based material.

== Track listing ==
1. "Bradfield"
2. "Cornish Wassailing"
3. "Sunny Bank"
4. "Winter Wonderland"
5. "Little Bilberry"
6. "Dilly Carol"
7. "Cold Winter"
8. "The Christmas Goose"
9. "Yorkshire Merry Christmas"
10. "Mount Lyngham" (While Shepherds Watched Their Flocks)
11. "The Frost Is All Over"
12. "The Wren"
