= Hand Me Down =

Studio album by Kate Rusby
- Released: 14 August 2020
- Genre: Folk
- Label: Pure Records
- Producer: Damien O'Kane

Kate Rusby chronology
Holly Head (2019)	Hand Me Down (2020)

Hand Me Down is the seventeenth studio album by English contemporary folk musician Kate Rusby, released on 14 August 2020 on Pure Records. Her first album to consist entirely of cover versions, it entered the UK Albums Chart at number 12, making it the highest-charting album of her career.

== Track listing ==
No.	Title	Length
1.	"Manic Monday"	4:37
2.	"Everglow"	4:16
3.	"Days"	4:19
4.	"If I Had a Boat"	4:34
5.	"Maybe Tomorrow (theme from The Littlest Hobo)"	4:23
6.	"The Show (theme from Connie)"	4:04
7.	"Shake It Off"	4:08
8.	"True Colours"	4:31
9.	"Carolina on My Mind"	4:45
10.	"Love Of The Common People"	3:43
11.	"Friday I'm In Love"	4:22
12.	"Three Little Birds"	4:00

== Charts ==
Chart performance for Hand me Down
Chart (2020)	Peak position
Scottish Albums (Official Charts)	6
UK Albums (Official Charts)	12
UK Album Downloads (Official Charts)	4
UK Folk Albums (Official Charts)	3
UK Independent Albums (Official Charts)	3
