= Make the Light =

Studio album by Kate Rusby
- Released: 22 November 2010
- Recorded: Summer 2010
- Venue: Pure Record Studio, South Yorkshire
- Genre: Folk
- Length: 48:42
- Label: Pure Records
- Producer: Kate Rusby, Joe Rusby

Kate Rusby chronology
Sweet Bells (2008)	Make the Light (2010)	While Mortals Sleep (2011)

Make the Light is the ninth studio album by folk musician Kate Rusby, released on 22 November 2010 on Pure Records. The album is the first to feature songs written solely by Rusby; this idea was suggested by actress Jennifer Saunders, with whom Rusby had previously worked on the show Jam & Jerusalem.

Self-produced by Rusby with her brother, Joe Rusby, the album features a variety of different musicians, including Rusby's husband, Damien O'Kane. Prior to the album's release, Rusby remarked, "I feel this album is quite different from my others; some of it is gritty, some of it is pretty and some of it is a bit wacky! But what fun we had making it. I hope people enjoy it!"

Professional ratings
Review scores
Source	Rating
BBC	(positive)
The Guardian	3/5 stars

== Track listing ==
All songs written by Kate Rusby.

1. "The Wishing Wife" - 3:24
2. "The Mocking Bird" - 4:07
3. "Let Them Fly" - 4:25
4. "Only Hope" - 4:40
5. "Lately" - 4:52
6. "Shout to the Devil" - 4:28
7. "Green Fields" - 5:10
8. "Fair Weather Friend" - 5:13
9. "Walk the Road" - 4:18
10. "Not Me" - 4:20
11. "Four Stars" - 3:45

== Personnel ==
=== Musicians ===
- Kate Rusby - vocals, guitar ("Only Hope", "Shout to the Devil", "Not Me", "Four Stars")
- Damien O'Kane - guitar, tenor banjo, tenor guitar, electric guitar, backing vocals
- Kevin McGuire - double bass
- Malcolm Stitt - bouzouki
- Julian Sutton - diatonic accordion
- John Joe Kelly - bodhran
- Donald Shaw - harmonium
- Donald Grant - first violin, string arrangements
- Catrin Morgan - second violin
- Rebecca Jones - viola
- Nicholas Trygstad - cello
- James Mackintosh - percussion
- Rob Westacott - cornet
- Andrew Holmes - flugel horn
- Jim Fletcher - tenor horn
- Michael Dodd - euphonium
- Matthew Broadbent - tuba
- Helena Smart - second violin
- Dave Edmonds - cello
- Diane Clark - double bass
- Rex Preston - vibraphone
- Andy Duncan - brass arrangements

=== Recording personnel ===
- Kate Rusby - producer
- Joe Rubsy - producer, engineer, mixing
- Damien O'Kane - assistant producer
- Bunt Stafford Clark - mastering

=== Artwork ===
- Andy Snaith - photography
- Jammy Design - design, artwork
