= Heartlands (Kate Rusby album) =

Soundtrack album by Kate Rusby
- Released: 2003
- Genre: British folk
- Length: 1:06:59
- Label: Pure Records

Kate Rusby chronology
10 (2002)	Heartlands (2003)	Underneath the stars (2003)

Heartlands is an album by British folk musicians Kate Rusby and John McCusker, released in 2003. It was the soundtrack to the film Heartlands.

== Track listing ==
1. "Colin's Farewell" (John McCusker) - 4:33
2. "Sweet Bride" (Kate Rusby) - 3:40
3. "Weeping Crisps" (John McCusker) - 3:47
4. "The Fairest Of all Yarrow" (Kate Rusby) - 3:33
5. "Wonder What Is Keeping My True Love" (Traditional; arranged by Kate Rusby and John McCusker) - 4:49
6. "Leafy Moped" (John McCusker) - 2:52
7. "William and Davy" Instrumental (Kate Rusby) - 1:34
8. "Drowned Lovers" (Traditional; arranged by Kate Rusby and John McCusker) - 5:10
9. "The Wild Goose" (Traditional; arranged by Kate Rusby) - 4:25
10. "The Beer Garden" (John McCusker) - 0:42
11. "I Saw That Sandra" (John McCusker) - 2:21
12. "Let The Cold Wind Blow" (Kate Rusby) - 5:20
13. "Yodelling Song" (Tim O'Brien) - 2:03
14. "The Brownies" (John McCusker) - 4:07
15. "Over You Now" (Kate Rusby) - 3:41
16. "Round The Next Corner" (John McCusker, Tim O'Brien) - 2:30
17. "The Sleepless Sailor" (Kate Rusby) - 4:35*
- At 9:37 there is a hidden track, totalling 11:59.
