= Holmfirth Anthem =

English folk song

The Holmfirth Anthem, also known as Pratty Flowers (sic), Abroad for Pleasure and Through the Groves, is an English choral folk song associated with Yorkshire, especially the rural West Riding, and particularly with the area around Holmfirth.

Despite its non-religious subject matter and its setting on a "summer's evening clear", the song has become part of the Yorkshire "village carol" or folk carol tradition, though it is also sung at other times of year. It has Roud number 1046.

== History ==
Many sources state the song was the work of Joe Perkin (1809–1868), a choirmaster at Holmfirth in the mid 19th century. A local tradition maintained that Perkin lived at Cliffe near Holmfirth, was a woolsorter by profession, and was paid 2 guineas by the Holmfirth Choral Society for arranging the song.

It is clear that Perkin did not write the tune or text, but rather produced an adaption of an earlier ballad for four-part harmony, which was then published locally. Related folk songs have been collected in southern England, although they are very rare. These 19th century variants are likely derived from a substantially longer 18th-century slip-ballad, The Maiden's Complaint for the Loss of her Shepherd, which was printed in about 1790, though the original text could be older. The very different, and textually corrupt version of the song found in southern England is usually known by the title Through the Groves.

The song retained enormous popularity in Holmfirth well into the 20th century, partly through being sung en masse at the end of yearly town concerts—the "Holmfirth Feast Sing", held in Victoria Park a week before Whitsun between 1882 and 1990—leading to it becoming known as the "Holmfirth Anthem". It is still often sung informally in villages in the Holme Valley area, although it is also found in the East Riding. It is a popular choice at village carol "sings" at Christmas, or at hunt meets in farming districts.

== Text and variants ==
The process of adaption and shortening of the original slip-ballad has left the text with a number of structural peculiarities. A number of variants exist, with different Yorkshire villages usually having their own particular texts. A common version from the Holmfirth area, with some other local variants, is as follows:

Abroad for pleasure as I was a-walking
It was one summer summer's evening clear
There I beheld a most beautiful damsel
Lamenting for her shepherd dear
Lamenting for her shepherd dear [variant: "shepherd swain"]

The dearest evening that e'er I beheld [variant: "The fairest evening that e're I beheld thee"]
Was ever ever ever with the lass I adore [variant: "evermore with the lad I adore"]
Wilt thou go fight yon French and Spaniards?
Wilt thou leave me thus my dear?
Wilt thou leave me thus my dear?

No more to yon green banks will I take thee
With pleasure for to rest thyself and view the lambs [variants: "rest myself" and "view the lands"]
But I will take thee to yon green garden
Where those pratty flowers grow
Where those pratty, pratty flowers grow

"Pratty" is simply a Yorkshire dialect pronunciation of "pretty", but is almost invariably written (and pronounced) "pratty".

In performance, each stanza is usually sung with a soloist singing the two first lines, with the ensemble repeating the two lines in four-part harmony: the soloist then sings the last three lines of the stanza (strictly two lines, with the last repeated), with the ensemble repeating them in harmony. The final three lines of the last stanza are often given an extra repeat, or occasionally several.

A Bluegrass version of the tune exists with the words 'wilt thou go fighting French and Spaniard' changed to 'must you go fighting...' in order to make it clear that the bereived woman doesn't wish her lover/husband to go to war:

== Recordings ==
There have been studio recordings of the Holmfirth Anthem by Kate Rusby, The Watersons, The Albion Band and others, though a number of field recordings exist of more typical community performances.
