= 10 (Kate Rusby album) =

Studio album by Kate Rusby
- Released: 2002
- Genre: English folk
- Length: 67:26

Kate Rusby chronology
Little Lights (2001)	10 (2002)	Heartlands (2003)

Professional ratings
Review scores
Source	Rating
Allmusic	3/5 stars

10 is an album by English folk musician Kate Rusby, released in 2002. It is a collection of re-recorded and re-mastered songs with some new tracks and live cuts.

== Track listing ==
No.	Title	Length
1.	"The Recruited Collier" (new version)
2.	"I Wish"
3.	"Over You Now"
4.	"The Sleepless Sailor" (new version)
5.	"The Fairest of All Yarrow" (new version)
6.	"I Wonder What is Keeping My True Love" (new version)
7.	"Sweet Bride" (re-mastered)
8.	"The Maid of LLanwellyn" (new version)
9.	"The Wild Goose" (new version)
10.	"Sir Eglamore"
11.	"Night Visiting Song" (re-mastered)
12.	"Cowsong" (re-mastered)
13.	"Botany Bay" (new version)
14.	"Drowned Lovers"
15.	"Bold Riley" (re-mastered)

== Personnel ==
- Kate Rusby - vocals, guitar
- Lester Simpson, Davy Steele - vocals
- Ian Carr, John Doyle, Malcolm Stitt - guitar
- John McCusker - banjo, cittern, fiddle, viola, whistle, piano
- Alison Brown, Andy Seward - banjo
- Jackie Wells - cello
- Michael McGoldrick - flute, whistle
- Andy Cutting - accordion
- Neil Yates - brass
- Conrad Ivitsky, Ewen Vernal - bass
- Francis MacDonald - drums
- James Mackintosh - percussion
