= Hourglass (Kate Rusby album) =

Studio album by Kate Rusby
- Released: 1 March 1997
- Genre: English folk
- Length: 46:20
- Label: Pure Records
- Producer: John McCusker

Kate Rusby chronology
Hourglass (1997)	Sleepless (1999)

Hourglass is the debut studio album by English contemporary folk musician Kate Rusby, released on 1 March 1997 on Pure Records. It was updated and remastered in 2022, to celebrate its 25th anniversary.

== Track listing ==
1. "Sir Eglamore" (Traditional; Rusby) - 4:14
2. "As I Roved Out" (Traditional) - 3:45
3. "Jolly Ploughboys" (Traditional) - 4:05
4. "Annan Waters" (Traditional) - 5:23
5. "Stananivy" (McCusker, Rusby) - "Jack and Jill" (Rusby; Traditional) - 3:06
6. "A Rose in April" (Rusby) - 5:38
7. "Radio Sweethearts" (Miller, McCusker) - 3:32
8. "I Am Stretched on Your Grave" (Frank O'Connor, Rusby) - 2:58
9. "Old Man Time" (Rusby) - 3:48
10. "Drowned Lovers" (Traditional) - 5:14
11. "Bold Riley" (Traditional) - 4:37

== Personnel ==
Produced by John McCusker
Engineered by Moray Munro
Recorded at Temple Record Studio, Midlothian, Scotland
Mastered by Andy Seward

- Kate Rusby - vocals, piano, guitar (3, 6, 9)
- Ian Carr - guitar (1, 5, 7, 10)
- Andy Cutting - diatonic accordion
- Donald Hay - percussion
- Conrad Ivitsky - double bass
- Alison Kinnaird - cello
- John McCusker - fiddles
- Michael McGoldrick - flute, whistles
- Tony McManus - guitar (2, 8)
- Alan Reid - harmony vocals (4)
- Eric Rigler - uilleann pipes
- Davy Steele - harmony vocals (3, 11)

All tracks arranged by Kate Rusby and John McCusker
(Additional arrangement by Ian Carr on tracks 1, 4, 7, 10)

== Sources ==
- Hourglass at AllMusic. Retrieved 19:07, 13 September 2016 (UTC).
