= Eden's Bridge =

English Christian band

- Origin: Yorkshire, England
- Genres: Celtic, folk rock, progressive rock
- Years active: 1993—present
- Members: Richard Lacy; Sarah Lacy; Jon Large; Terl Bryant; David Bird
- Website: www.edensbridge.net Archived 2012-03-13 at the Wayback Machine

Eden's Bridge is a Christian band whose style covers elements of Celtic folk, pop, and rock.

Eden's Bridge came into existence in 1993, born from a number of musical sessions by siblings, Sarah and Richard Lacy. Along with David Bird, they have written a number of songs and instrumentals together.

== Partial discography ==
EMI Celtic-series 1995-98

- Celtic Worship 1995
- Celtic Psalms 1996
- Celtic Praise 1997
- Celtic Christmas 1997 (reissued as Irish Christmas: 12 Celtic Carols and Songs)
- Celtic Worship 2 1998
- Celtic Reflections on Hymns 1998
- The Best of Celtic Praise and Worship 1998 (compilation by band; includes the previously unreleased "Morning Prayer")

All the rest:

- Fear No Evil 1994 (includes songs subsequently used in early "Celtic Series" CDs, as well as "Watching Time," otherwise released only in "Live in a Little Room," and original version of "How Brightly Shone the Moon" from "Celtic Christmas")
- Celtic Lullabies: Dreaming for Little Souls 1998
- Celtic Journeys: All in a Life 1999
- Isle of Tides 2002
- Live - In a Little Room 2003 (also issued as Celtic Worship Live: The Acoustic Renderings Of Eden's Bridge; includes Bruce Cockburn's "All the Diamonds")
- New Celtic Worship 2005
1. "The Glory of All of Me (Sufficiency)"
2. "The Crossing Place (I Wrote This For you Yesterday)"
3. "I Heard the Voice of Jesus Say"
4. "Breath and Promise"
5. "Before the Throne of God Above"
6. "Hear My Prayer"
7. "Lay Me Down"
8. "Father Hear the Prayer We Offer"
9. "Simple Shoes"
10. "Wake and See the Day"
11. "Sun of the Seasons"
12. "On My Side"
13. "Distant World"

"The Seasons" - four CD set (available as individual CDs and downloads):

1. The Winter Sings 2010
2. First Leaf 2011
3. The Longest Day 2011
4. Fading Light 2011

== Other projects ==
- Simeon Wood and Richard Lacy: Ear To The Ground 2003
- Northern Lights: The View From The North 2006 (acoustic project by the band)
