= The Girl Who Couldn't Fly =

Studio album by Kate Rusby
- Released: 11 October 2005
- Recorded: Pure Records Studio, South Yorkshire
- Genre: Folk
- Length: 49:27
- Label: Pure Records
- Producer: John McCusker

Kate Rusby chronology
Underneath the Stars (2003)	The Girl Who Couldn't Fly (2005)	Awkward Annie (2007)

Professional ratings
Review scores
Source	Rating
Allmusic	4/5 stars

The Girl Who Couldn't Fly is an album by British folk musician Kate Rusby, released in 2005. The title refers to Rusby's fear of flying.

The album cover features a painting by Blur guitarist Graham Coxon.

== Track listing ==
All songs by Kate Rusby unless otherwise stated.

1. "Game of All Fours" (Traditional, arranged by Rusby and John McCusker) – 3:40
2. "The Lark" – 4:16
3. "No Names" – 3:28
4. "Mary Blaize" (Traditional lyrics, music by Rusby) – 3:25
5. "A Ballad" (Traditional lyrics, music by Rusby) – 4:50
6. "You Belong to Me" (Pee Wee King, Redd Stewart, Chilton Price)– 3:25
7. "Elfin Knight" (Traditional)– 4:04
8. "The Bonnie House of Airlie" (Traditional, arranged by Rusby and McCusker) – 5:39
9. "Moon Shadow" – 4:23
10. "Wandering Soul" – 4:12
11. "Fare Thee Well" – 3:41
12. "Little Jack Frost" – 4:24

== Personnel ==
- Kate Rusby - vocals, guitar
- Roddy Woomble - vocals
- Kellie While - vocals
- Ian Carr - guitar, tenor guitar
- John McCusker - tenor guitar, guitar, cittern, fiddle, viola, whistle, piano
- Andy Cutting - accordion
- Ewen Vernal - double bass
- Andy Seward - double bass
- Donald Shaw - harmonium
- John Doyle - tenor guitar
- Kris Drever - tenor guitar
- Michael McGoldrick - flute, whistle
- Neil Yates - trumpet, horn
- Jim Fletcher - euphonium
- Matt Broadbent - tuba
- Keith Angel - snare drum
- Greg Lawson - violin
- Carole Howat - violin
- Steve King - viola
- Kevin McCrae - cello
