= Little Lights =

Studio album by Kate Rusby
- Released: 4 June 2001
- Recorded: Pure Records Studio, South Yorkshire
- Genre: Folk
- Length: 52:25
- Label: Pure
- Producer: John McCusker

Kate Rusby chronology
Sleepless (1999)	Little Lights (2001)	10 (2002)

Professional ratings
Review scores
Source	Rating
Allmusic	3/5 stars

Little Lights is an album by British folk musician Kate Rusby, released in 2001.

== Track listing ==
All songs by Kate Rusby unless otherwise stated.

1. "Playing of Ball" (Words trad., music Rusby) – 3:31
2. "I Courted a Sailor" – 3:58
3. "Withered and Died" (Richard Thompson) – 3:58
4. "Merry Green Broom" (Words trad./Rusby, music Rusby) – 3:22
5. "Let the Cold Wind Blow" – 5:18
6. "Canaan's Land" (Trad. arranged by Rusby/John McCusker) – 3:50
7. "Some Tyrant" (Trad. arranged by Rusby/McCusker) – 5:09
8. "William and Davy" – 4:03
9. "Who Will Sing Me Lullabies?" – 5:20
10. "Matt Hyland" (Words trad., music Kate Rusby) – 4:59
11. "My Young Man" – 4:05
  - "The Big Ship Sails" (Trad. arranged by Rusby/McCusker) (hidden track) – 2:11

== Personnel ==
- Kate Rusby – vocals, guitar
- Ian Carr – guitar
- John Doyle – guitar
- Darrell Scott – guitar, vocals
- Ewen Vernal – double bass
- Andy Seward – double bass
- Danny Thompson – double bass
- Andy Cutting – diatonic accordion
- Mairtin O'Connor – accordion
- Michael McGoldrick – flute, whistle
- John McCusker – fiddle, cittern, whistle
- Malcolm Stitt – bouzouki
- Tim O'Brien – mandolin, vocals
- Alison Brown – banjo
- Keith Angel – percussion, marimba
- Eddi Reader – vocals
- John Jones – vocals
- Alan Morrison – cornet
- Richard Marshall – cornet
- Sandy Smith – horn
- Nick Hudson – trombone
- Shaun Crowther – tuba

== Charts ==
Chart performance for Litte Lights
Chart (2001)	Peak position
Scottish Albums (Official Charts)	67
UK Albums (Official Charts)	75
UK Independent Albums (Official Charts)	4
