= Ghost (Kate Rusby album) =

Studio album by Kate Rusby
- Released: 4 August 2014
- Genre: Folk
- Label: Pure Records
- Producer: Kate Rusby and Damien O'Kane

Kate Rusby chronology
20 (2012)	Ghost (2014)	The Frost Is All Over (2015)

Ghost is the 13th album by English folk singer Kate Rusby, released in August 2014.

== Critical reception ==
Professional ratings
Review scores
Source	Rating
The Daily Telegraph	4/5 stars
Financial Times	4/5 stars
The Northern Echo	(favourable)
The Press	3/5 stars
Uncut	(7/10)

Ghost received generally positive reviews from music critics. Writing for The Daily Telegraph, Martin Chilton stated that the album has a "pleasing freshness", partly down to the blending of Stevie Iveson's electric guitar with more traditional folk instrumentation. Uncut's Neil Spencer said that, while the album gives the listener the impression they have heard much of Ghost before, Rusby's "many fans won't mind".

== Track listing ==
No.	Title	Length
1.	"The Outlandish Knight"	4:56
2.	"The Youthful Boy"	5:44
3.	"We Will Sing"	4:11
4.	"Bonnie Bairns"	5:44
5.	"Three Jolly Fishermen"	3:40
6.	"I am Sad"	5:07
7.	"Martin Said"	4:18
8.	"After This"	4:50
9.	"The Magic Penny"	4:49
10.	"The Night Visit"	5:42
11.	"Silly Old Man"	5:08
12.	"Ghost"	5:49
