= While Mortals Sleep (album) =

Studio album by Kate Rusby
- Released: 14 November 2011
- Studio: Pure Records Studio
- Genre: Folk, Christmas
- Length: 50:37
- Label: Pure Records

Kate Rusby chronology
Make the Light (2010)	While Mortals Sleep (2011)	20 (2012)

While Mortals Sleep is the second Christmas album by English folk musician Kate Rusby, released on 14 November 2011 on Pure Records. Similar to Rusby's previous Christmas release, Sweet Bells (2008), the album features South Yorkshire-based material, and features artwork by Marie Mills.

Professional ratings
Review scores
Source	Rating
The Guardian	4/5 stars

== Track listing ==
1. "Cranbrook" - 3:46
2. "Home" - 3:47
3. "Kris Kringle" - 4:09
4. "Little Town of Bethlehem" - 5:33
5. "Joy to the World" - 3:17
6. "Holmfirth Anthem" - 4:16
7. "Seven Good Joys" - 3:48
8. "Rocking Carol" - 3:51
9. "Shepherds Arise" - 4:45
10. "First Tree in the Greenwood" - 5:43
11. "Diadem" - 4:21
12. "The Wren" - 3:21
