= Awkward Annie =

Studio album by Kate Rusby
- Released: 3 September 2007
- Recorded: Pure Records Studio, South Yorkshire
- Genre: Folk
- Length: 51:37
- Label: Pure Records
- Producer: Kate Rusby

Kate Rusby chronology
The Girl Who Couldn't Fly (2005)	Awkward Annie (2007)	Sweet Bells (2008)

Professional ratings
Review scores
Source	Rating
Allmusic	4/5 stars
BBC Music	(not rated)
The Guardian	3/5 stars
Q	3/5 stars
FolkRadio.co.uk	5/5 stars

Awkward Annie is the seventh studio album by English contemporary folk musician Kate Rusby, released on 3 September 2007 on Pure Records. The album is the first to be produced by Rusby herself, following her split with husband and producer John McCusker.

Regarding her role as producer Rusby states that:

It wasn’t something that was planned, but the split from John two years ago has inevitably put a strain on our working relationship, and sadly meant that it wasn’t the right time for us to make a record together. So the best thing was to produce this record myself, it’s been a long and at times lonely road, but with help from [my brother] Joe we got there in the end. John still played on the record. He’s a brilliant musician and a great fella'.

== Song information ==
Rusby states that the track "Bitter Boy" is her favourite composition that she herself has written.

"John Barbury" is set to a traditional melody, Child Ballad 89 ("Fause Foodrage"), while its lyrics originate from Child Ballad 100 ("Willie O Winsbury"). This tune became well known in the late 1960s after Richard Thompson used it as the basis for the Fairport Convention song "Farewell, Farewell".

The bonus track, a cover of The Kinks' song "The Village Green Preservation Society", was recorded as the theme for BBC TV sitcom Jam and Jerusalem.

== Track listing ==
All tracks are written by Rusby, except where noted.

1. "Awkward Annie" - 3:14
2. "Bitter Boy" - 4:54
3. "John Barbury" (Traditional) - 5:42
4. "High On a Hill" - 4:30
5. "Farewell" (Traditional) - 5:30
6. "Planets" - 4:10
7. "The Old Man" (Traditional) - 3:49
8. "Andrew Lammie" (Traditional) - 3:54
9. "Streams of Nancy" (Traditional) - 3:57
10. "Daughter of Heaven" - 3:56
11. "Blooming Heather" (Traditional) - 4:44
12. "The Village Green Preservation Society" (Ray Davies) (bonus track) - 3:17
