= Life in a Paper Boat =

Studio album by Kate Rusby
- Released: 7 October 2016
- Genre: Folk
- Length: 54:25
- Label: Pure
- Producers: Damien O'Kane; Kate Rusby

Kate Rusby chronology
The Frost Is All Over (2015)	Life in a Paper Boat (2016)	Angels and Men (2017)

Life in a Paper Boat is the fourteenth solo album by English folk singer Kate Rusby, released in October 2016. The album, while featuring Rusby's signature mix of traditional and original songs, marked a sonic departure from previous releases: synthesizers and drum programming were used extensively throughout the record. Critics described the sonic change as "done in the best possible taste….any initial surprise or shock soon wears off as you get accustomed to the gentle opulence of the soundscape” and “[giving] a modern context while retaining all the elements…[of] the folk tradition." The album's titular track, a Rusby composition, was inspired by the European migrant crisis. In "Hunter Moon," another original, the moon is in love with the sun—and longingly tracks the sun's progress every day, from dawn to sunset.

== Track listing ==
No.	Title	Length
1.	"Benjamin Bowmaneer"	3:50
2.	"Hunter Moon"	5:01
3.	"The Ardent Shepherdess"	3:47
4.	"Life in a Paper Boat"	4:40
5.	"Only Desire What You Have"	4:08
6.	"Hundred Hearts"	4:15
7.	"The Mermaid"	4:30
8.	"Pace Egging Song"	3:41
9.	"The Witch of Westmorland"	6:34
10.	"I'll Be Wise"	5:07
11.	"Night Lament"	5:07
12.	"Big Brave Bill"	3:45

== Charts ==
Chart performance for Life in a Paper Boat
Chart (2016)	Peak position
Irish Albums (IRMA)	30
Scottish Albums (Official Charts)	50
UK Albums (Official Charts)	98
UK Album Downloads (Official Charts)	38
UK Independent Albums (Official Charts)	19
