= Sleepless (Kate Rusby album) =

Studio album by Kate Rusby
- Released: 10 May 1999
- Genre: English folk
- Length: 43:41
- Label: Pure Records
- Producer: John McCusker

Kate Rusby chronology
Hourglass (1997)	Sleepless (1999)	Little Lights (2001)

Professional ratings
Review scores
Source	Rating
AllMusic	4/5 stars

Sleepless is an album by the English folk musician Kate Rusby, released in 1999. It was nominated for the Mercury Prize the same year. It won the BBC Radio 2 Folk Award 2000 for best album.

== Critical reception ==
The Washington Post wrote that Rusby "often creates ... ambience at the cost of blurring her melodies and stories; her vowels frequently flood the music until the consonants and rhythms are submerged in a tide of poignancy."

== Track listing ==
1. "The Cobbler's Daughter" (Kate Rusby/Traditional)
2. "I Wonder What is keeping my True Love This Night" (Traditional)
3. "The Fairest of all Yarrow" (Kate Rusby/Traditional)
4. "The Unquiet Grave" (Kate Rusby/Traditional)
5. "Sho Heen" (Kate Rusby)
6. "Sweet Bride" (Kate Rusby)
7. "All God's Angels" (Kate Rusby)
8. "The Wild Goose" (Traditional)
9. "The Duke and the Tinker" (Kate Rusby/Traditional)
10. "Our Town" (Iris DeMent)
11. "The Sleepless Sailor" (Kate Rusby)
12. "Cowsong"
13. "Botany Bay" (Kate Rusby/Traditional)

== Personnel ==
- Kate Rusby - vocals, piano, guitar
- Dave Burland - vocals
- Ian Carr - guitar
- Andy Cutting - diatonic accordion
- Donald Hay - percussion
- Conrad Ivitsky - double bass
- John McCusker - fiddle, banjo
- Michael McGoldrick - whistle, flute
- Francis Macdonald - percussion
- Tim O'Brien - vocals, mandolin
- Darrell Scott - guitar
- Andy Seward - double bass
- Roger Wilson - vocals, guitar
