= Sweet Bells =

Studio album by Kate Rusby
- Released: 15 December 2008 (original); 9 November 2009 (re-release)
- Genre: Folk
- Length: 44:07
- Label: Pure Records
- Producer: Kate Rusby, Joe Rusby

Kate Rusby chronology
| Awkward Annie (2007) | Sweet Bells (2008) | Make the Light (2010) |

Alternative cover
- The album's original cover.

Professional ratings
Review scores
| Source | Rating |
|---|---|
| The Guardian | 4/5 stars |

Sweet Bells is the first Christmas album by English contemporary folk musician Kate Rusby, released on 15 December 2008 on Pure Records. In November 2011, Rusby released a follow-up, entitled While Mortals Sleep (2011).

The album was re-released on 9 November 2009 featuring new cover artwork by Marie Mills. Sweet Bells, the carol featured on the album, is a carol peculiar to Yorkshire, based on the carol While Shepherds Watched Their Flocks by Night but with an alternative tune and extra lyrics.

== Track listing ==
1. "Here We Come A-Wassailing" - 3:09
2. "Sweet Bells" - 3:34
3. "Poor Old Horse" - 3:45
4. "Hark the Herald" - 4:29
5. "The Holly and the Ivy" - 3:21
6. "Hark, Hark, What News" - 3:21
7. "Candlemas Eve" - 5:18
8. "Hail Chime On" - 4:12
9. "Serving Girl's Holiday" - 4:37
10. "Awake Arise Good Christians" - 3:42
11. "The Miner's Dream of Home" - 4:39
