= John McCusker =

Scottish folk musician (born 1973)

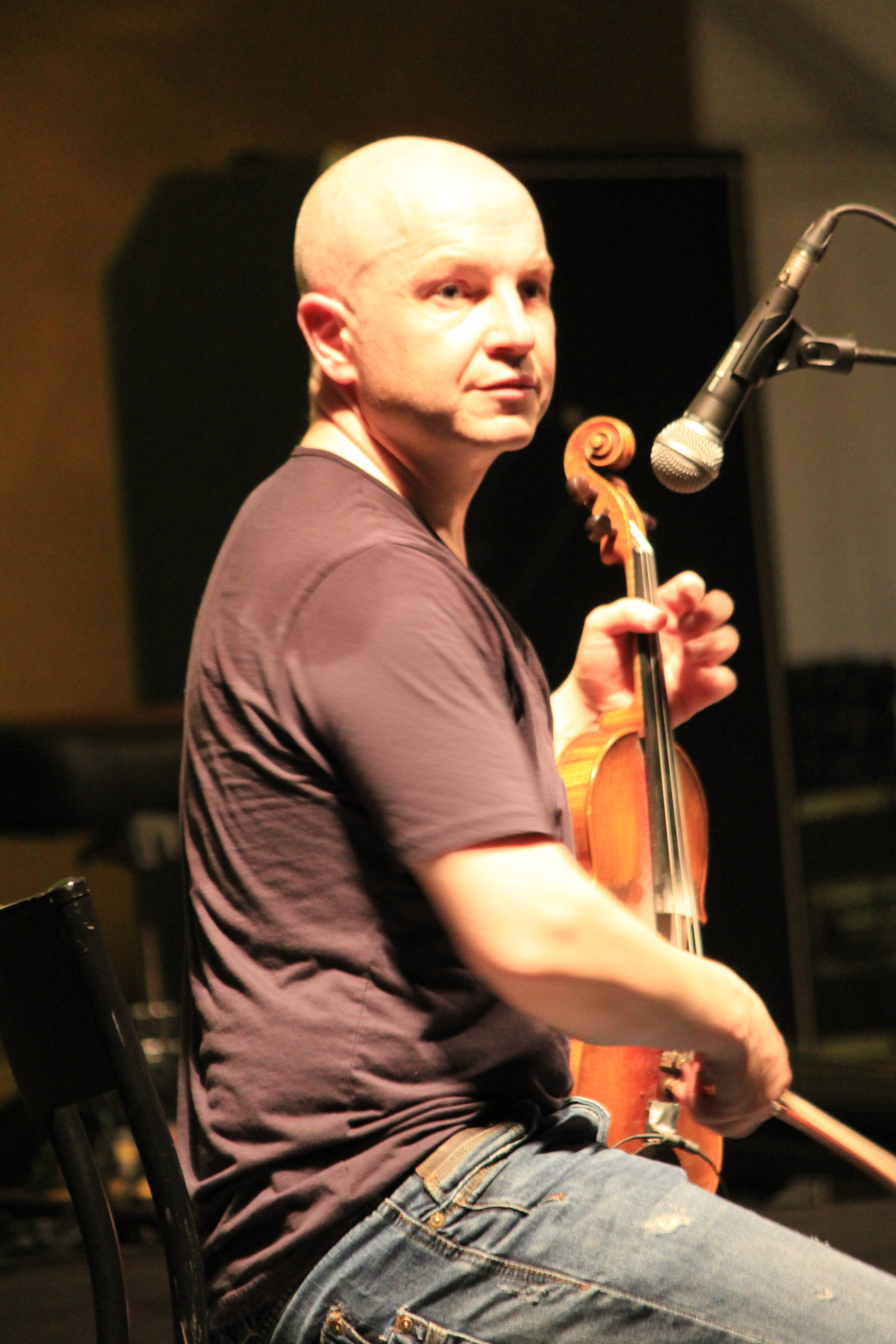
- McCusker performing at the Festival Interceltique de Lorient in 2012

Background information
- Born: 15 May 1973 (age 53); Bellshill, Scotland
- Genres: Folk rock, folk, alternative country, rock
- Occupations: Musician; producer; composer; music arranger
- Instruments: Violin, tin whistle, cittern, guitar
- Years active: 1991–present
- Labels: Mike McGoldrick, John McCusker & John Doyle
- Formerly of: Battlefield Band; Parcel O'Rogues
- Website: johnmccusker.co.uk

John McCusker (born 15 May 1973) is a Scottish folk musician, record producer, and composer. In the 1990s, McCusker was a member of the Battlefield Band. He worked as both a band member and producer for folk singer Kate Rusby. He has produced and arranged music for various artists and has released several solo albums.

== Biography ==
McCusker was born in Bellshill, Scotland, on 15 May 1973. He began learning the fiddle at age seven and subsequently participated in local youth orchestras and cèilidh bands. At fourteen, he formed a band with schoolmates called Parcel O'Rogues, named after Robert Burns' poem Sic a Parcel o' Rogues in a Nation. At sixteen, McCusker declined an offer from the Royal Scottish Academy in Glasgow in order to tour with the Battlefield Band, with whom he remained for eleven years. His first solo album, John McCusker, was released by Temple Records in 1995.

McCusker has performed on albums by artists including Ocean Colour Scene, Paul Weller, Teenage Fanclub, Eddi Reader, Tim O'Brien, and Linda Thompson. He has also performed with artists such as Bonnie Raitt, Patti Smith, Steve Earle, Rosanne Cash, Paolo Nutini, and Jools Holland.

McCusker worked as a producer for folk singer Kate Rusby, whom he married in August 2001. The couple divorced in 2006.

In 2003, after being introduced to Simon Fowler of Ocean Colour Scene by bassist Mike McNamara, McCusker received the BBC Radio 2 Folk Musician of the Year award.

In 2007, the Celtic Connections festival and the Cambridge Folk Festival commissioned McCusker to compose Under One Sky. This work featured Scottish and English musicians from various genres, including Gaelic singer Julie Fowlis and former Blur guitarist Graham Coxon. McCusker toured the UK in November and December 2008 in support of Under One Sky.

In 2012, McCusker performed with the Birmingham-based band Merrymouth and appeared on Simon Fowler's album of the same name, subsequently joining their UK tour.

In 2014, McCusker contributed to Wenlock Hill, the album by Simon Fowler's solo project Merrymouth. The album also featured Chas Hodges from Chas & Dave.

== Discography ==
=== Solo albums ===
- John McCusker (1995)
- Yella Hoose (2001)
- Goodnight Ginger (2004)
- Before the Ruin (2008) (with Roddy Woomble and Kris Drever)
- Under One Sky (2009) (with Under One Sky tour artists)
- Hello, Goodbye (2016)

=== As producer ===
- Kate Rusby and Kathryn Roberts – Kate Rusby & Kathryn Roberts (1995)
- Kate Rusby – Hourglass (1997)
- Kate Rusby – Sleepless (1999)
- Cathie Ryan – Somewhere Along the Road (2001)
- Kate Rusby – Little Lights (2001)
- Kate Rusby – 10 (2002)
- Blazin' Fiddles – The Old Style (2002)
- Kate Rusby – Underneath the Stars (2003)
- Cathie Ryan – The Farthest Wave (2005)
- Kate Rusby – The Girl Who Couldn't Fly (2005)
- Roddy Woomble – My Secret is My Silence (2006)
- Kris Drever – Black Water (2006)
- Eddi Reader – Peacetime (2007)
- Drever, McCusker, Woomble – Before the Ruin (2008)
- Under One Sky – Under One Sky (2009)
- Kris Drever – Mark the Hard Earth (2010)

=== Other appearances ===
- Ballad of the Broken Seas – Mark Lanegan and Isobel Campbell (2006)
- Ballads of the Book – Idlewild's "The Weight of Years" (2007)
- This Is What Makes Us – Foxface (2007)
- 22 Dreams – Paul Weller (2008)
- Kill to Get Crimson – Mark Knopfler (2008)
- In Love and Light – Heidi Talbot (2008)
- Hold Your Horses – Ella Edmondson (2009)
- Love is the Way – Eddi Reader (2009)
- Post Electric Blues – Idlewild (2009)
- Get Lucky – Mark Knopfler (2009)
- Bretonne – Nolwenn Leroy (2010)
- Transatlantic Sessions 5 (2010) – (directed by Jerry Douglas and Aly Bain)
- Merrymouth – Simon Fowler (2012)
- Live (with Michael McGoldrick & John Doyle, 2009 tour) – (Vertical Records, 2012)
- Privateering – Mark Knopfler (2012)
- Suitcase – Jennifer Byrne (2013)
- Wenlock Hill – Merrymouth (2014)
- Tracker – Mark Knopfler (2015)
- The Art of Forgetting – Kyle Carey (2018)
- The Wishing Tree (with Michael McGoldrick and John Doyle) – (Under One Sky Records, 2018)
- Down the Road Wherever – Mark Knopfler (2018)
- Flat Earth Society (fiddle on Doris, low whistle on Come Winter, He'll Be Gone, tin whistle on Peacock Blues) – West of Eden (2019)
- Yes, I Have Ghosts – David Gilmour (2020)
- One Deep River – Mark Knopfler (2024)

== Awards and nominations ==
=== Awards won ===
- BBC Radio 2 Folk Awards 2016 – Good Tradition Award
- Glenfiddich Spirit of Scotland Award for Music 2009
- BBC Radio 2 Folk Music Awards 2003 – Musician of the Year
- Glenfiddich Spirit of Scotland Award for Music 1999

=== Nominations ===
- BBC Radio 2 Folk Music Awards – Musician of the Year 2010
- Ireland's Music Awards – Best Instrumentalist 2009
- BBC Radio 2 Folk Music Awards – Musician of the Year 2009
- Scots Trad Music Awards – Composer of the Year 2007
- BBC Radio 2 Folk Music Awards – Musician of the Year 2008
- BBC Radio 2 Folk Music Awards – Musician of the Year 2007
