= Underneath the Stars (album) =

Studio album by Kate Rusby
- Released: 11 August 2003
- Genre: Folk
- Length: 53:35
- Label: Pure Records
- Producer: John McCusker

Kate Rusby chronology
Heartlands (2003)	Underneath the Stars (2003)	The Girl Who Couldn't Fly (2005)

Professional ratings
Review scores
Source	Rating
AllMusic	4.5/5 stars

Underneath the Stars is the fourth studio album by English folk musician Kate Rusby, released on 11 August 2003 on Pure Records.

In a 2007 interview, Rusby noted that "The Blind Harper", which appears on this album, is her favourite traditional song.

== Track listing ==
1. "The Good Man" (Kate Rusby/Traditional) - 4:31
2. "The Daughter of Megan" (Kate Rusby) - 3:53
3. "Let Me Be" (Kate Rusby/PF Sloan/Traditional) - 3:55
4. "Cruel" (Kate Rusby/Traditional) - 4:32
5. "The Blind Harper" (Nic Jones/Traditional) - 4:07
6. "The White Cockade" (Traditional) - 4:42
7. "Young James" (Kate Rusby) - 4:49
8. "Falling" (Kate Rusby) - 4:37
9. "Bring Me a Boat" (Kate Rusby) - 5:29
10. "Polly" (Kate Rusby/Traditional) - 4:06
11. "Sweet William's Ghost" (Kate Rusby/Traditional) - 5:34
12. "Underneath the Stars" (Kate Rusby) - 3:20

== Personnel ==
- Kate Rusby - vocals, guitar
- Ian Carr - guitar, mandolin
- John McCusker - cittern, ukulele
- Andy Cutting - diatonic accordion
- Neil Yates - trumpet, flugelhorn
- Ewen Vernal - double bass
- James Macintosh - percussion, wee bells

== Charts ==
Chart performance for Underneath the Stars
Chart (2003)	Peak position
Scottish Albums (Official Charts)	45
UK Albums (Official Charts)	78
UK Independent Albums (Official Charts)	9
