= Damien O'Kane =

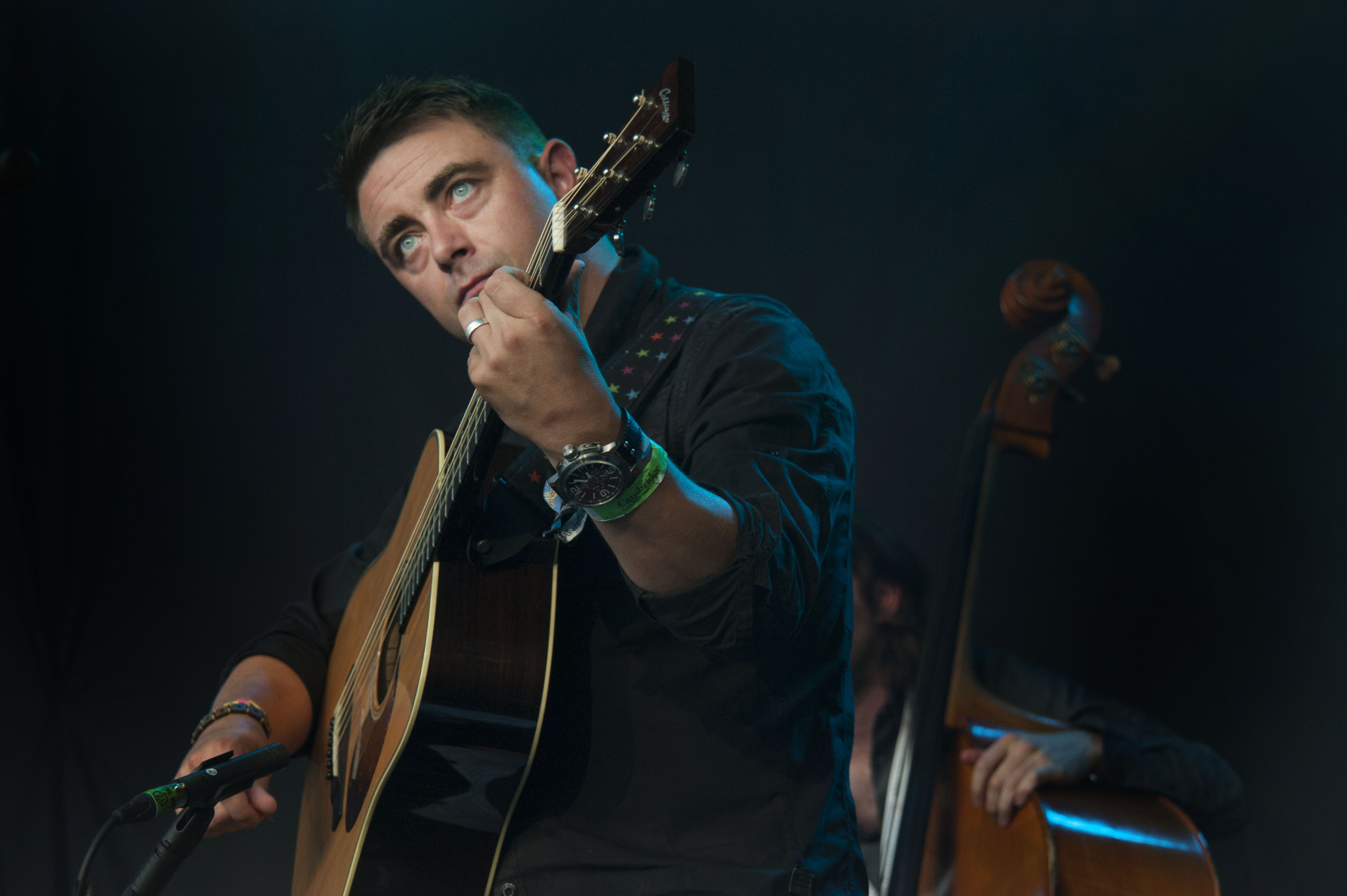

Background information
- Born: 1 September 1978 (age 48); Coleraine, Northern Ireland
- Genre: Folk
- Occupations: Musician, singer
- Instruments: Banjo, guitar, tenor guitar
- Label: Pure Records (Yorkshire) Ltd
- Website: damienokane.co.uk

Damien O'Kane (born 1 September 1978) is an Irish musician, born in Coleraine, County Londonderry. He lives in Yorkshire with his wife, the folk musician Kate Rusby, and their two daughters.

== Career ==
O'Kane graduated from Newcastle University in 2005 and has been performing ever since. He has performed with Flook and also in a duo with Shona Kipling. O'Kane is now pursuing his own solo career, as well as touring with Kate Rusby. His solo work features songs from his native Northern Ireland and his trademark instrumentals.

== Personal life ==
Damien is married to singer/songwriter Kate Rusby; the couple have two daughters.

== Discography ==
- Banjophonics, 2022 (with Ron Block)
- Banjophony, 2018 (with Ron Block)
- “The Mystery Inch”, 2011 (with David Kosky)
- While Mortals Sleep, 2011 (with Kate Rusby)
- Make the Light, 2010 (with Rusby)
- Sweet Bells, 2008 (with Rusby; PRCD33)
- Haven, 2006 (Flook)
- Box On, 2006 (Shona Kipling + O'Kane)
- Momentum, 2005 (CrossCurrent)
- Melodeon Crimes, 2005 (Julian Sutton instrumental album)
- Pure Chance, 2003 (Shona Kipling + O'Kane)

=== Solo albums ===
- Summer Hill (2010, Pure Records)
- Areas of High Traffic (2016, Pure Records)
- Avenging and Bright (2017, Pure Records)

=== Guest appearances ===
- Songs from Twisting River - West of Eden: tenor guitar on The Bee That Stung and Black Boat, banjo on River Fowey and Song for a Rover and acoustic guitar on River Fowey and The Bee That Stung (2014)
- Look to the West - West of Eden (banjo on Rainy Town) (2016)
- Flat Earth Society - West of Eden (tenor guitar on Horsehoofs & Primroses and banjo on Old Miss Partridge) (2019)
