= Kate Rusby =

English folk singer-songwriter

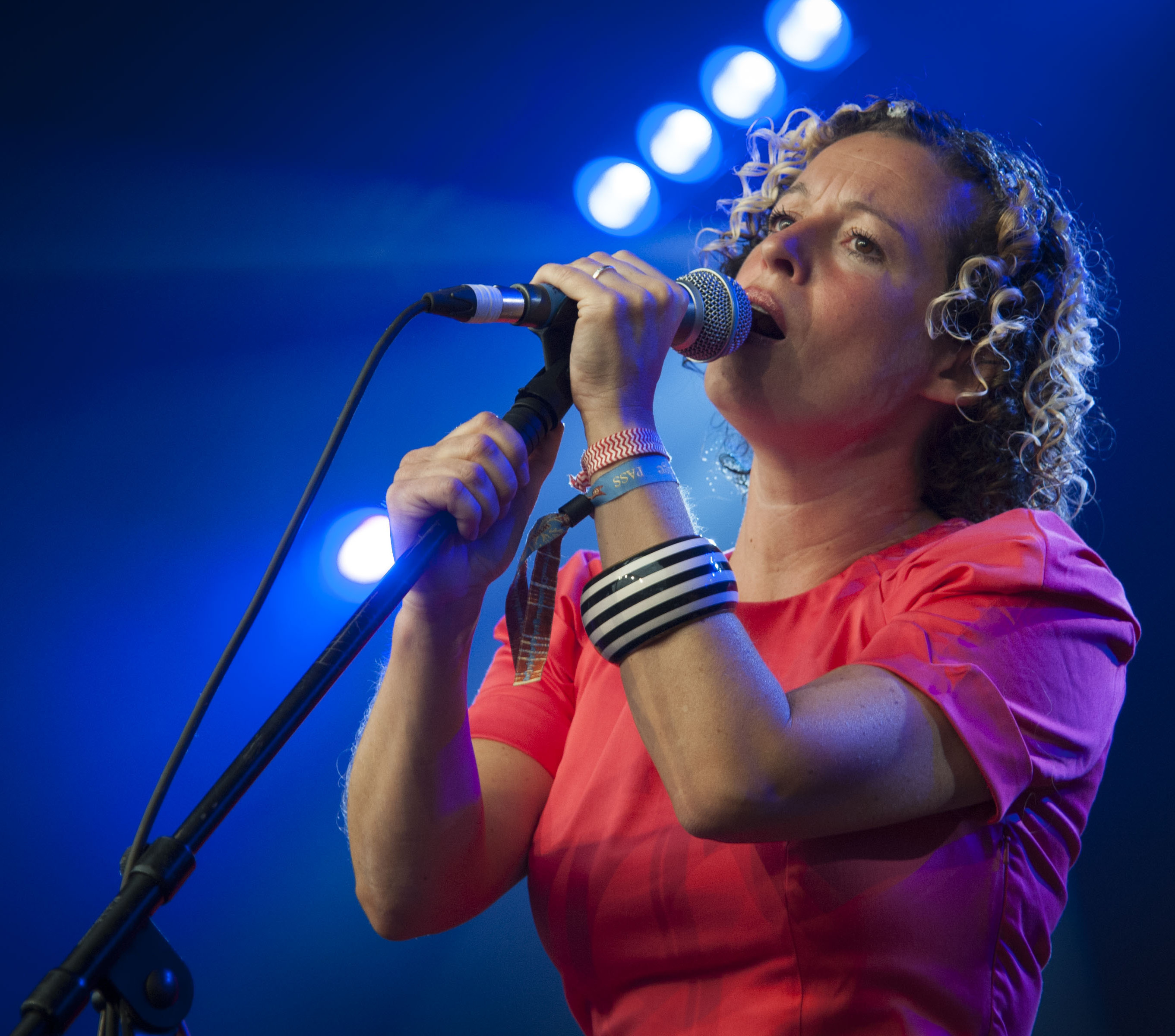
- Rusby performing at the 2014; Cambridge Folk Festival
- Born: Kate Anna Rusby; 4 December 1973 (age 52); Penistone, West Riding of Yorkshire, England
- Occupation: Singer-songwriter
- Years active: 1992–present
- Spouses: John McCusker (m. 2001; div. 2006); Damien O'Kane (m. 2010)
- Children: 2
- Musical career
- Genre: English folk music
- Instruments: Guitar, vocals, piano, fiddle
- Label: Pure Records
- Formerly of: Equation, The Poozies
- Website: katerusby.com

Kate Anna Rusby (born 4 December 1973) is an English folk singer-songwriter from Penistone, South Yorkshire. Sometimes called the "Barnsley Nightingale", she has headlined various British folk festivals and is one of the best known contemporary English folk singers. In 2001 The Guardian described her as "a superstar of the British acoustic scene". In 2007 the BBC website described her as "The first lady of young folkies". She is one of the few folk singers to have been nominated for the Mercury Prize.

== Life and career ==
Rusby was born into a family of musicians in 1973 in Penistone, Barnsley, and grew up in nearby Oxspring . After learning to play the guitar, the fiddle and the piano, as well as to sing, she played in many local folk festivals as a child and adolescent, before joining (and becoming the lead vocalist of) the all-female Celtic folk band the Poozies. 1995 saw the release of her breakthrough album, Kate Rusby & Kathryn Roberts, a collaboration with her friend and fellow Barnsley folk singer Kathryn Roberts. In 1997, with the help of her family, Rusby recorded and released her first solo album, Hourglass. Since then she has gone on to receive acclaim in her home country and abroad and her family continues to help her with all aspects of her professional career.

Rusby was also a member of the folk group Equation, later to be replaced by Cara Dillon. The early line-up also featured Rusby's erstwhile performing partner Kathryn Roberts and Mercury-nominated artist Seth Lakeman, and his brother, Sean Lakeman. Their first EP, In Session, had a small commercial release and led to them signing a major record deal with WEA.

The previously unreleased song "Wandering Soul" was Rusby's contribution to Billy Connolly's Musical Tour of New Zealand, the soundtrack to Billy Connolly's eight-part BBC One television documentary series World Tour of New Zealand, originally broadcast in November 2004.

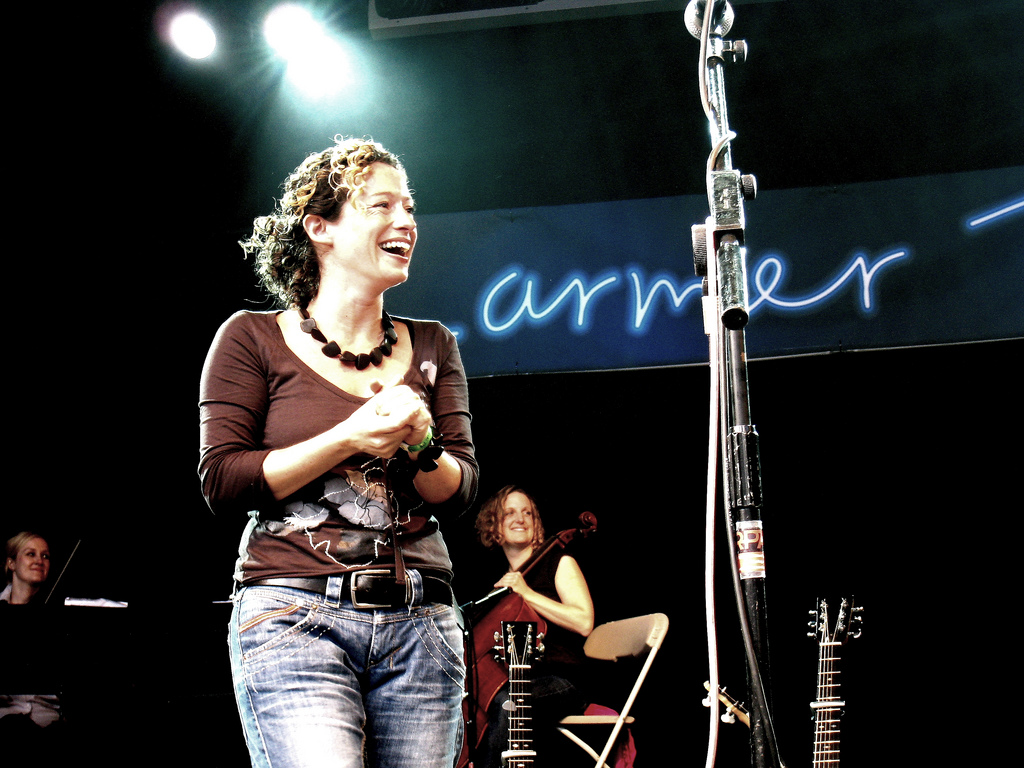
Rusby at the Larmer Tree Festival 2008

A collaboration with Ronan Keating saw Rusby riding high in the UK Singles Chart; their duet "All Over Again" peaked at No. 6 in June 2006. She also made a vocal contribution to My Secret Is My Silence, the successful debut solo album of Roddy Woomble, the lead singer of Idlewild. In the same year her cover of The Kinks' "The Village Green Preservation Society" was used as the theme tune to the BBC One television sitcom Jam & Jerusalem. Rusby wrote several new songs for the series, and was credited as being responsible for the show's music.

Launched at the 2007 Cambridge Folk Festival, the album Awkward Annie was released on 3 September 2007 and reached No. 2 on the UK indie charts. "The Village Green Preservation Society" is included as a bonus track.

2008 saw the release of Sweet Bells, an album of traditional Christmas songs interpreted by Rusby. She has since released five more Christmas albums: While Mortals Sleep (2011), The Frost Is All Over (2015), Angels & Men (2017), Holly Head (2019) and Light Years (2023). Each December, Rusby embarks on a Christmas tour across the United Kingdom.

In 2010, Rusby released the album Make the Light, a collection of self-penned songs. In 2014, she released the album Ghost, which featured traditional songs and three Rusby originals. Rusby's fourteenth solo album, Life in a Paper Boat, was released in 2016 with a fourth Christmas album Angels and Men, the following year. In May 2019, Rusby released another album entitled Philosophers, Poets & Kings, her fifth Christmas album followed six months later.

Heading into the new decade, Rusby released a cover album of popular songs including "Shake It Off" (Taylor Swift), "Everglow" (Coldplay) and "Friday I'm in Love" (The Cure) plus many more. The album was produced in the height of the COVID-19 pandemic, with Rusby saying "It was always the plan to make this album this year, lock-down just made it more intimate". Her most recent work is called 30: Happy Returns and marks 30 years of being a professional musician. The songs are newly recorded versions of favourites from across her career. It was released in May 2022.

In 2001 The Guardian described her as "a superstar of the British acoustic scene." In 2007 the BBC website described her as "The first lady of young folkies". She is one of the few folk singers to have been nominated for the Mercury Prize.

== Personal life ==
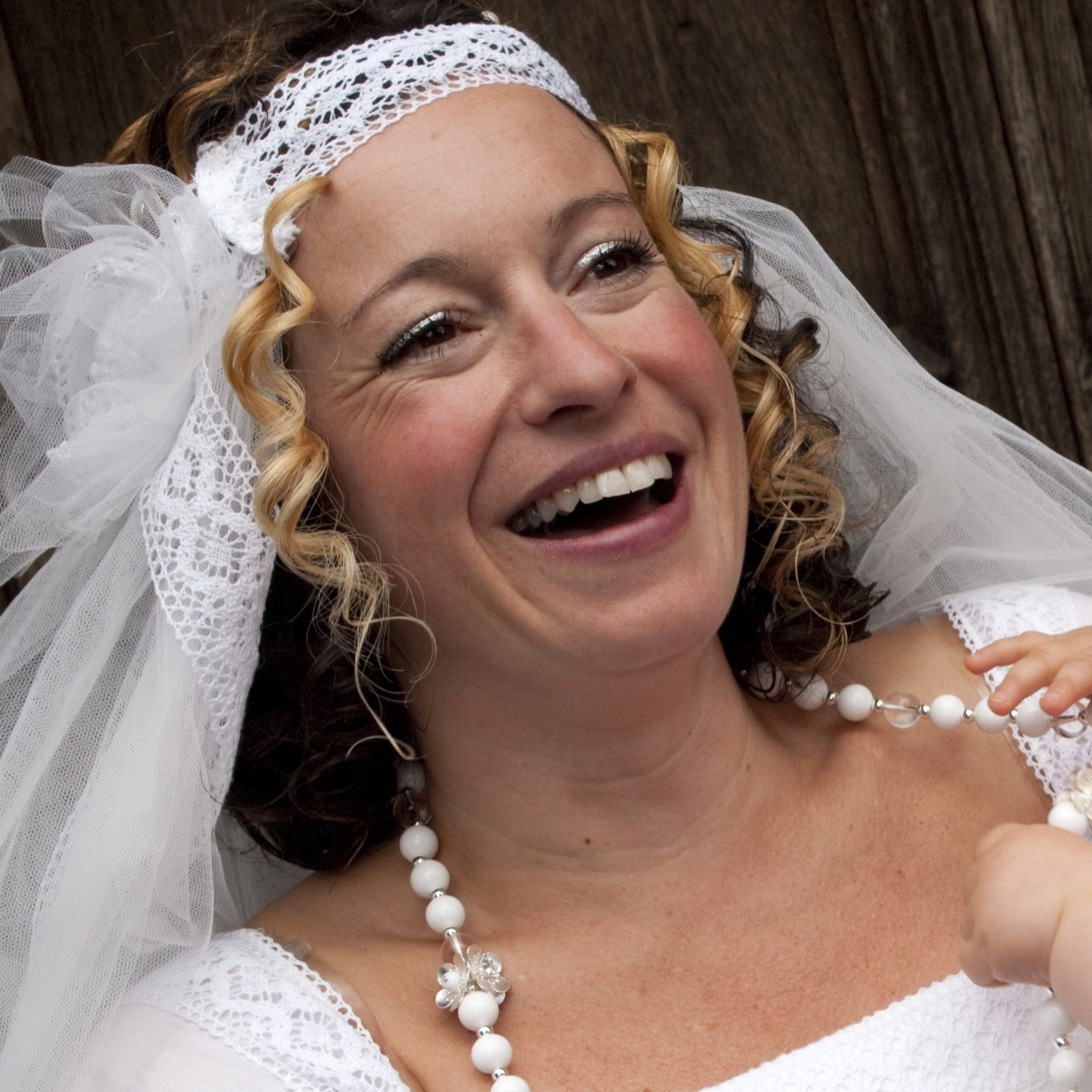
Rusby at her 2010 wedding to fellow musician Damien O'Kane

In August 2001, Rusby married Scottish fiddler and fellow band member John McCusker (formerly of the Battlefield Band), who produced most of her recordings up to The Girl Who Couldn't Fly. They divorced in 2006. In June 2010, she married Irish musician Damien O'Kane, with whom she has two children.

== Discography ==
=== Solo albums ===
- Hourglass (1997)
- Sleepless (1999)
- Little Lights (2001)
- 10 (2002)
- Heartlands (2003)
- Underneath the Stars (2003)
- The Girl Who Couldn't Fly (2005)
- Awkward Annie (2007)
- Make the Light (2010)
- 20 (2012)
- Ghost (2014)
- Life in a Paper Boat (2016)
- Philosophers, Poets & Kings (2019)
- Hand Me Down (2020)
- 30: Happy Returns (2022)
- When They All Looked Up (2025)

=== Christmas albums ===
- Sweet Bells (2008)
- While Mortals Sleep (2011)
- The Frost Is All Over (2015)
- Angels and Men (2017)
- Holly Head (2019)
- Light Years (2023)

== Awards ==
=== Mercury Music Prize ===
- 1999: Sleepless – nominated

=== BBC Radio 2 Folk Awards ===
- 2000: Folk Singer of the Year – winner
- 2000: Best Album: Sleepless – winner
- 2002: Best Original Song: "Who Will Sing Me Lullabies" – winner
- 2006: Best Original Song: "No Names" (with Roddy Woomble) – nominated
- 2006: Best Album: The Girl Who Couldn't Fly – nominated
- 2006: Best Live Act – winner

=== Other ===
- 2014: BASCA Gold Badge award
