= Cheap Pearls and Whisky Dreams – The Best Of =

Cheap Pearls and Whisky Dreams – The Best of

Compilation album by Love and Money
- Released: 5 April 1999
- Length: 72:53
- Label: Fontana

Love and Money chronology
Littledeath (1993)	Cheap Pearls and Whisky Dreams – The Best of (1999)	The Devil's Debt (2012)

Cheap Pearls and Whisky Dreams – The Best of is a compilation album by Scottish band Love and Money, released by Fontana in 1999.

== Critical reception ==
Professional ratings
Review scores
Source	Rating
AllMusic	4/5 stars
The Encyclopedia of Popular Music	4/4 stars
Q	3/5 stars

On its release, Neil McKay of Sunday Life wrote, "A vehicle for the classy songwriting of James Grant, Love and Money made some fine soul and country tinged pop rock over the course of four albums spanning the late 80s and early 90s." Nick Duerden of Q noted the band's shift from their initial image as "Scotland's latest rock hopes" to "a cult act whose heart-on-sleeve approach often went against mainstream tastes" after Grant discovered "jazz, subtlety, and artful contemplation". He described Grant as being "blessed with the lyricism of a poet" and added it was a "shame" that the band "only ever reached a tiny audience".

== Track listing ==
All tracks are written by James Grant, except "Jocelyn Square" and "Wanderlust 2" by Grant and Bobby Paterson, and "You Are Beautiful" by Grant and Paul McGeechan

No.	Title	Original release	Length
1.	"Halleluiah Man"	Strange Kind of Love	4:35
2.	"Winter"	Dogs in the Traffic	4:04
3.	"River of People"	All You Need Is...	4:41
4.	"Who in their Right Mind"	Wishing Waters EP	4:50
5.	"Walk the Last Mile"	Strange Kind of Love	5:03
6.	"Last Ship on the River"	Littledeath	4:38
7.	"My Love Lives in a Dead House"	Dogs in the Traffic	4:39
8.	"Strange Kind of Love"	Strange Kind of Love	5:14
9.	"Looking for Angeline"	Dogs in the Traffic	3:50
10.	"Jocelyn Square"	Strange Kind of Love	4:00
11.	"You Are Beautiful"	All You Need Is...	4:47
12.	"Up Escalator"	Strange Kind of Love	4:10
13.	"Wanderlust 2"	"Halleluiah Man" CD single	3:51
14.	"Sometimes I Want to Give Up"	Dogs in the Traffic	4:09
15.	"Pray for Love"	Littledeath	3:24
16.	"Candybar Express"	All You Need Is...	3:30
17.	"Whisky Dream"	Dogs in the Traffic	3:28

== Personnel ==
Production

- Gary Katz – producer (1, 5, 8, 10, 12)
- Steve Nye – producer (2, 7, 14)
- Tom Dowd – producer (3, 11)
- Love and Money – producer (4, 6, 9, 13, 15, 17)
- Tony Phillips – producer (4)
- Andy Taylor – producer (16)
- Paul McGeechan – mastering

Other

- Paul McGeechan, Paul Reidy – compilers
- Adrian Thrills – sleeve notes
- M4 Design – sleeve design
