= Winter (Love and Money song) =

Single by Love and Money

from the album Dogs in the Traffic
- Released: 18 November 1991
- Length: 4:09
- Label: Fontana
- Songwriter: James Grant
- Producer: Steve Nye

Love and Money singles chronology
"Looking for Angeline" (1991)	"Winter" (1991)	"The Last Ship on the River" (1994)

"Winter" is a song by Scottish band Love and Money, which was released in 1991 as the third and final single from their third studio album Dogs in the Traffic. The song was written by James Grant and produced by Steve Nye. "Winter" reached No. 52 in the UK Singles Chart and remained in the Top 100 for two weeks.

== Release ==
"Winter" was originally to be released as the first single from Dogs in the Traffic, with a scheduled release date of 28 May 1991. However, shortly before its release date, Fontana chose to release "My Love Lives in a Dead House" in favour of "Winter" as they felt the song's title would hinder its success during the spring season.

"Winter" was later released as the album's third and final single on 18 November 1991. As a publicity stunt to generate airplay on BBC Radio 1, Fontana organised the dumping of three tons of snow outside the BBC's headquarters, Broadcasting House. "Winter" was the band's last UK chart entry, reaching No. 52 in the UK Singles Chart. The song also reached No. 10 on the Music Week Top 50 Airplay Chart.

== Critical reception ==
On its release as a single, Peter Kinghorn of the Evening Chronicle described "Winter" as a "reflective song" which is "strong on melody". In a review of the intended May 1991 release, Steve Stewart of The Press and Journal gave "Winter" three stars and wrote, "This is a bit of a departure for Love and Money, after the slick production of Strange Kind of Love. But the rough guitar and wandering lyrics have a strange appeal."

== Track listing ==
7-inch single

1. "Winter" – 4:09
2. "Blue Eyed World" – 4:38

12-inch and CD single

1. "Winter" – 4:09
2. "Blue Eyed World" – 4:38
3. "Dreamscape Angel" – 4:22
4. "Winter '89" – 3:54

CD single (UK limited edition)

1. "Winter" – 4:09
2. "Wanderlust II" – 3:53
3. "Halleluiah Man" – 4:36
4. "Candybar Express" – 3:28

== Personnel ==
Credits are adapted from the UK CD single liner notes and the Dogs in the Traffic booklet.

Love and Money

- James Grant – vocals, guitar
- Douglas MacIntyre – guitar, backing vocals
- Paul McGeechan – keyboards
- Bobby Paterson – bass, backing vocals
- Gordon Wilson – drums

Production

- Steve Nye – producer and mixing on "Winter"
- Barry Hammond – recording engineer on "Winter"
- Stuart Bruce – mix engineer on "Winter"
- Tony Phillips, Love and Money – producers on "Blue Eyed World", "Dreamscape Angel" and "Winter '89"
- Love and Money – producers on "Wanderlust II"
- Kenny McDonald – engineer on "Wanderlust II"
- Gary Katz – producer on "Halleluiah Man"
- Wane Yurgelun – engineer on "Halleluiah Man"
- Dave Bascombe – engineer on "Candybar Express"

Other

- Stylorouge – design

== Charts ==
Chart (1991)	Peak position
Luxembourg (Radio Luxembourg)	17
UK Singles (OCC)	52
UK Airplay (Music Week)	10
