= The Devil's Debt =

Studio album by Love and Money
- Released: 2012
- Length: 44:35
- Label: Vertical
- Producer: Love and Money

Love and Money chronology
Cheap Pearls and Whisky Dreams – The Best Of (1999)	The Devil's Debt (2012)

The Devil's Debt is the fifth studio album by Scottish band Love and Money, released by Vertical in 2012.

== Background ==
In 2011, Love and Money reunited to perform at Glasgow Royal Concert Hall as part of the Celtic Connections festival, which was followed later in the year with a concert at the SEC Centre. The band's reunion led to the decision to record both new material and some of the songs originally intended for the shelved album The Mother's Boy, which was recorded between 1988's Strange Kind of Love and 1991's Dogs in the Traffic.

The Devil's Debt was released in 2012 and reached No. 60 on the Scottish Albums Chart. The title track was released as a single, with a music video produced by the thirteensquared production company. The video was shot at Govanhill Baths and Òran Mór in Glasgow.

== Critical reception ==
On its release, Alan Morrison of The Herald felt the album contained "some of the best songs James Grant and co have ever written" and praised Grant's "deep crooner of a voice". He added: "Personally, I'd rather listen to this than Strange Kind of Love".

== Track listing ==
No.	Title	Writer(s)	Length
1.	"The Devil's Debt"	James Grant	4:29
2.	"Goodbye Phoebus"	Grant	3:42
3.	"This Is the Last Time"	Grant	3:41
4.	"I Never Touched Her"	Grant, Douglas MacIntyre	4:28
5.	"Piglet"	Grant	4:57
6.	"Sin of Pity"	Grant, MacIntyre	4:45
7.	"Modigliani Baby"	Grant, MacIntyre	5:11
8.	"I'm Just Too Good for You"	Grant	5:09
9.	"The Desired"	Grant, McGeechan	3:54
10.	"Amaranth"	Grant	4:19

== Personnel ==
Love and Money

- James Grant – lead vocals, guitar, string arrangement
- Douglas MacIntyre - guitar
- Paul McGeechan – keyboards
- Gordon Wilson - drums

Additional musicians

- Ewen Vernal - bass
- Kennedy Aitchison - string arrangement
- Monica Queen - vocals
- Fraser Speirs - harmonica (tracks 6, 8, 10)
- Stuart Nisbet - pedal steel guitar (track 8)
- Gwen Stewart - vocals (track 8)
- Deirdre Rutkowski, Louise Rutkowski - vocals (track 10)

Production

- Love and Money - producers
- Paul McGeechan - engineer, mixing, mastering
- Brian McNeil, Brian Young, Clark Neville, Disco Dave, Duncan Cameron, Gavin McCombe, Geoff Martin, Gordy Goudie, Jamie Savage, John Cameron, Johnny Smillie, Keith Mitchell, Scott Campbell, Steven Scott - additional engineers

Other

- Steve Kempster - design
- Anne-Janine Nugent – photography

== Charts ==
Chart (2012)	Peak position
Scottish Albums (OCC)	60
