= Jocelyn Square =

Single by Love and Money

from the album Strange Kind of Love
- Released: 13 March 1989 (UK)
- Length: 3:58
- Label: Fontana; Mercury
- Songwriter(s): James Grant; Bobby Paterson
- Producer(s): Gary Katz

Love and Money singles chronology
| "Strange Kind of Love" (1989) | "Jocelyn Square" (1989) | "Up Escalator" (1989) |

"Jocelyn Square" is a song by Scottish band Love and Money, which was released in 1989 as the third single from their second studio album Strange Kind of Love. The song was written by James Grant and Bobby Paterson, and produced by Gary Katz. "Jocelyn Square" reached No. 51 in the UK Singles Chart and remained in the Top 100 for four weeks.

== Background ==
"Jocelyn Square" was inspired by the Glasgow place of the same name (now known as Jocelyn Gate). Grant told Simon Mayo for the Reading Evening Post in 1989, "I used to pass there whenever I was going to Paddy's Market, which was a place where you could buy cheap gear, old false teeth and spectacles and stuffed birds, amongst other things."

== Critical reception ==
On its release as a single, Myrna Minkoff of New Musical Express selected "Jocelyn Square" as one of two "singles of the week" in the 18 March 1989 issue. She wrote, "L&M have finally got a handle on elegant post-soul pop in the same poignant way that the Blow Monkeys' 'Digging Your Scene' managed. This evocative extract from a journal elevates itself above the meagre everydayness-of-it-all with some jazz-upholstered settings for the chorus." Ian Forsyth of the Press and Journal gave the song four out of five stars. He considered the song to be "another gem" from the band, but felt it "won't make the impression on the singles market the group's talent deserves". He added, "[The band's] loyal following will note the distinctive feel of the 45 and will not be disappointed."

== Track listing ==
7-inch single (UK/Australia)

1. "Jocelyn Square" – 3:58
2. "Saint Henry" – 3:34

7-inch single (Europe)

1. "Jocelyn Square" – 3:58
2. "Looking for Angeline" – 3:48

12-inch and CD single (UK)

1. "Jocelyn Square" – 3:58
2. "Rosemary" (Recorded live at Glasgow School of Art October 1988) – 3:11
3. "Saint Henry" – 3:31
4. "Candybar Express" (Shep Pettibone Mix) – 6:05

12-inch single (UK limited edition)

1. "Jocelyn Square" – 3:58
2. "Halleluiah Man" (Recorded live at Birmingham Goldwyn's October 1988) – 3:56
3. "Razorsedge" (Recorded live at Glasgow Art College October 1988) – 3:53

12-inch and CD single (Europe)

1. "Jocelyn Square" – 3:58
2. "Looking for Angeline" – 3:48
3. "Set the Night On Fire" – 4:18
4. "Scapegoat" – 3:48

== Personnel ==
Credits are adapted from the UK and European CD single liner notes and the Strange Kind of Love booklet.

Love and Money

- James Grant – lead vocals, wah guitar, electric guitar, dobro
- Paul McGeechan – keyboards, piano
- Bobby Paterson – bass

Additional musicians

- Jeff Porcaro – drums
- Leroy "Humour" Clouden – additional drums
- Tim Schmidt – backing vocals

Production

- Gary Katz – producer on "Jocelyn Square" and "Scapegoat"
- Wayne Yurgelun – engineer on "Jocelyn Square" and "Scapegoat"
- Eric Eckley – assistant engineer on "Jocelyn Square" and "Scapegoat"
- Bill Price – mixing on "Jocelyn Square" and "Scapegoat"
- Love and Money – producers on "Looking for Angeline", "Saint Henry" and "Set the Night On Fire"
- Brian Young – engineer on "Looking for Angeline" and "Set the Night On Fire"
- Alistair Owen (for Radio Clyde) – recording engineer on "Rosemary" (Live) and "Razorsedge" (Live)
- Ian Edwards (for John Slater Show BRMB Radio) – recording engineer on "Halleluiah Man" (Live)
- Shep Pettibone – mixing on "Candybar Express"

Other

- Stylorouge – design, art direction
- Avid Images – photography

== Charts ==
| Chart (1989) | Peak position |
|---|---|
| UK Singles (OCC) | 51 |
