= My Love Lives in a Dead House =

Single by Love and Money

from the album Dogs in the Traffic
- B-side: "Rust"
- Released: 24 June 1991
- Length: 4:45
- Label: Fontana
- Songwriter(s): James Grant
- Producer(s): Steve Nye

Love and Money singles chronology
"Up Escalator" (1989)	"My Love Lives in a Dead House" (1991)	"Looking for Angeline" (1991)

"My Love Lives in a Dead House" is a song by Scottish band Love and Money, released in 1991 as the lead single from their third studio album Dogs in the Traffic. The song was written by James Grant and produced by Steve Nye. It peaked at number 83 in the UK Singles Chart.

== Background ==
Grant wrote "My Love Lives in a Dead House" after spending a night in Glasgow "getting rat-arsed" with Grahame Skinner of the Scottish band Hipsway. While walking along Byres Road, Grant ran into Pat Kane of the pop duo Hue and Cry with his wife and baby. He recalled in an interview with Alastair McKay in 1991, "I had this Budweiser cap on and my specs, and I just looked like real death. I was seeing the wee wean [Kane's baby] and all that and I thought, 'Fuck sake'. I looked at myself in a shop window and I was like, 'Jesus Christ, what a loser, that could have been me [with a family] a couple of years ago'." Upon returning home that night, Grant wrote the song.

The song's jazzy sound is attributed to Grant's love of the American jazz musician Miles Davis. Speaking of its title and lyrics, Grant told McKay, "It's not as gothic as it sounds. I was trying to be funny again. When I say 'my love' I'm not talking about my chick. It's my emotion." The song was specifically written as a potential hit single, as was another track which would appear on Dogs in the Traffic, "Sometimes I Want to Give Up", after Fontana asked the band to come up with a couple of songs with chart potential. Grant recalled on the Reliving My Youth Podcast in 2022, "I think 'My Love Lives in a Dead House' is a really good piece of writing. It's clever."

== Release ==
Love and Money originally wanted "Winter" to be released as the lead single from Dogs in the Traffic and successfully convinced their label, Fontana, to release it. Shortly before its scheduled release date of 28 May 1991, Fontana had a change of heart as they felt the song's title would hinder its success during the upcoming summer season. They then chose to release "My Love Lives in a Dead House" instead, which was issued as the lead single on 24 June 1991.

The single's B-side, "Rust", was exclusive to the single. The 12-inch and CD formats of the single contained an additional two tracks, "Tomorrow Never Comes" and "Treasure and Treason", which were also exclusive to the single. The initial batch of CD copies came housed in a special limited edition cardboard box, which was designed with room to house additional singles due for release from Dogs in the Traffic.

"My Love Lives in a Dead House" failed to reach the top 75 in the UK Singles Chart and reached its peak of number 83 in its first week on 6 July 1991. It received limited airplay on BBC Radio but was more successful on Independent Local Radio. On 27 July 1991, the song was listed at number 7 on the Music & Media National Airplay chart for Italy for its heavy play on Rai Radio 2.

== Critical reception ==
Upon its release as a single, the Accrington Observer awarded it a four out of five star rating and commented, "My Tip for the Top, this is not unlike INXS in musical construction and vocals but a touch smoother. Could just wiggle into the top 10." Peter Kinghorn of the Newcastle Evening Chronicle described the song as "very atmospheric and mystically moody". Jim Whiteford of the Dundee Evening Telegraph called it a "splendidly cool beat tune", with which "Scotland's most underrated team are back on the hit trail". The Fife Free Press remarked that the "excellent" Love and Money "preview their forthcoming set with the slinky jazz and blues-laced" track. According to Grant, when the song was reviewed on BBC Radio 1's Round Table, Noddy Holder of Slade, who appeared as a guest reviewer, proclaimed that the song was a "number one record".

David Quantick of NME was negative in his review, writing, "Not the sort of title that will get 'em going at Radio 1. One can't really see Steve Wright playing [it], especially as it is a glum troll through some strange Nick Cave version of cocktail jazz. No, it doesn't sound interesting." Marcus Hodge of the Cambridge Evening News was also critical of the track, noting that the title "promises so much and, inevitably, the delivery is not up to much". He wrote, "They splash around aimelessly with a slow jazzy rhythm and the general impression is of a band dipping their toes rather than a full-blooded jump into the deep end. They used to make great soul records."

== Track listing ==
7-inch single (UK and Europe)

1. "My Love Lives in a Dead House" – 4:45
2. "Rust" – 2:54

12-inch and CD single (UK and Europe)

1. "My Love Lives in a Dead House" – 4:45
2. "Rust" – 2:54
3. "Tomorrow Never Comes" – 3:46
4. "Treasure and Treason" – 3:57

== Personnel ==
Credits are adapted from the CD single liner notes and the Dogs in the Traffic booklet.

Love and Money

- James Grant – vocals, guitar
- Douglas MacIntyre – guitar, backing vocals
- Paul McGeechan – keyboards
- Bobby Paterson – bass, backing vocals
- Gordon Wilson – drums

Additional musicians

- The Kick Horns – horns ("My Love Lives in a Dead House")

Production

- Steve Nye – producer ("My Love Lives in a Dead House")
- Barry Hammond – engineer ("My Love Lives in a Dead House")
- Stuart Bruce – mixing ("My Love Lives in a Dead House")
- Love and Money – producers and mixers ("Rust", "Tomorrow Never Comes", "Treasure and Treason")
- Nicky Ash – producer ("Tomorrow Never Comes")

Other

- Stylorouge – design
- Gavin Evans – photography

== Charts ==
Chart (1991)	Peak position
UK Singles Chart (OCC)	83
