= Sawdust in My Veins =

Studio album by James Grant
- Released: 27 April 1998
- Length: 46:20
- Label: Survival (UK); Valley Entertainment (US)
- Producer: Donald Shaw

James Grant chronology
Sawdust in My Veins (1998)	My Thrawn Glory (2000)

Sawdust in My Veins is the debut solo studio album by Scottish singer-songwriter James Grant, released in the UK by Survival Records on 27 April 1998. The album reached number 42 in the Scottish Albums Chart.

A single, "Pray the Dawn", was released in the UK on 6 April 1998. The album was released in the US by Valley Entertainment on 26 September 2000.

== Background ==
In a 1998 interview with Teletext, Grant said in response to the suggestion that the album is full of "melancholy ballads", "I don't mean to be miserable; it's just how the songs come out really. I didn't plan them that way. It's more a stream of consciousness, I suppose."

== Critical reception ==
Professional ratings
Review scores
Source	Rating
AllMusic	4.5/5 stars
The Encyclopedia of Popular Music	3/4 stars
Q	4/5 stars

On its release, Stuart Maconie, writing for Q, stated that "lovers of craft will delight in this, with its elegant memories, and seductive chord changes". He praised the "excellent arrangements" of Grant's "splendid voice and guitar" in front of "subtle strings and unobtrusive backing". He concluded, "Grant's pop star chances may have evaporated, but it's a callous world if that blinds us to these fine songs." James McNair of Mojo felt the album showed Grant's songwriting "at its zenith", adding that his "Scott Walker-deep voice [has] matured to perfection and his guitar playing as tasteful as ever". He felt the production was "a little dated in places", but added that fans of Grant's previous work will "love this record".

Tom Ferguson of Music & Media felt Grant had "finally made the album his admirers always believed he was capable of" and praised it as an "impeccably played and sung set". He felt some of the album was reminiscent of "the silky Steely Dan-isms" of Love and Money, but added that "Grant's first solo outing is a more personal, mature work". He added that many of the tracks "wouldn't sound out of place on AC-leaning radio formats". Colin Larkin, in his Encyclopedia of Popular Music, praised it as a "strong solo set".

== Track listing ==
All tracks are written by James Grant except "Is Anybody Dreaming?" by Grant and Paul McGeechan

No.	Title	Length
1.	"Pray the Dawn"	3:28
2.	"All Her Saturdays"	4:25
3.	"I Can't Stop Bleeding"	3:41
4.	"Cure for Life"	4:21
5.	"I Don't Know You Anymore"	4:55
6.	"Is Anybody Dreaming?"	3:31
7.	"No Chicane"	4:29
8.	"Hide"	5:41
9.	"This Is the Last Time"	3:46
10.	"Sawdust in My Veins"	3:42
11.	"If You Love Me Leave Me Alone"	4:09

== Personnel ==
Credits are adapted from the Sawdust in My Veins CD booklet.

- James Grant – vocals, acoustic guitar, electric guitar, bass
- Donald Shaw – keyboards, accordion
- James Mackintosh – drums, percussion
- Fraser Speirs – harmonica
- The BT Scottish Ensemble – strings
- Karen Matheson – backing vocals
- Kevin McCrae – arrangement
- Wilf Taylor – shaker (track 3)
- Marc Duff – whistle (track 3)
- AJ Nugent – backing vocals (track 4)
- Gwen Stewart – backing vocals (track 8)

Production

- Donald Shaw – producer
- Grant Milne – engineer
- Paul McGeechan – additional programming
- Stuart Hamilton – string recording
- Calum Malcolm – mixing, mastering

Other

- Tank Design – design
- Craig Mackay – photography

== Charts ==
Chart (1998)	Peak position
Scottish Albums (OCC)	42
UK Albums (OCC)	166
UK Independent Albums (OCC)	22
