= I Shot the Albatross =

Studio album by James Grant
- Released: 10 June 2002
- Length: 40:36
- Label: Vertical
- Producer: James Grant

James Grant chronology
My Thrawn Glory (2000)	I Shot the Albatross (2002)	Holy Love (2004)

I Shot the Albatross is the third solo studio album by Scottish singer-songwriter James Grant, released in the UK by Vertical on 2002. The album is a collection of poetry by various poets set to music written by Grant.

== Background ==
Grant first had the idea of setting poetry to music after he purchased the anthology The Rattle Bag in the early 1990s. He was inspired to carry out such a project after he and Donald Shaw collaborated in 1999 on the music for a Scottish film titled Transition, which involved Grant selecting, editing and narrating a selection of 20th century Scottish poetry. Grant then spent a period of researching and reading more poetry before gathering a number of poems and setting them to music. He stated in 2002, "The poems themselves are, of course, the definitive. They have their own rhythm and musicality. This idea is derivative and deeply subjective."

In a 2005 interview with Rainsound, Grant said of the I Shot the Albatross project, "It's just something that interested me and I decided to pursue it. Some of the poems [in The Rattle Bag] seemed to me very lyrical and I kind of liked the idea of fusing for example Rimbaud, Lee Dorsey and William Blake. It seemed to me kind of cheeky and irreverent, yet I thought it would put a new spin on the poetry itself and, I suppose, would also challenge people."

== Critical reception ==
Professional ratings
Review scores
Source	Rating
The List	3/5 stars

On its release, James McNair of Mojo wrote, "Here, the modest, uncompromising and gifted Grant makes what might have been pretentious sound human, his palette largely acoustic. He occasionally comes unstuck, but there are moments when the poets' visions and Grant's own merge to stunning effect." He picked "The Tragedy of the Leaves" and "Summer Farm" as "Grant's aces". Manchester Evening News concluded, "Grant has picked some particularly evocative verses and framed them so sensitively that you would need a heart of stone not to admire the results". The reviewer selected "The Horses" and "The Tragedy of the Leaves" as "particularly striking". Ninian Dunnett of The List noted that the album finds Grant doing his "best [to] whip up an atmosphere" and "concoct a rich stew of moody settings for [the] poems". He concluded, "It's hit-and-miss fare, nicely spiced with the wonderful, Emmylou-ish voice of Monica Queen."

== Track listing ==
All tracks are written by James Grant except "Summer Farm" by Grant and Donald Shaw (music only).

No.	Title	Words by	Length
1.	"A Tale Best Forgotten"	Helen Adam	6:58
2.	"Long John Brown and Little Mary Bell"	William Blake	4:18
3.	"The Tragedy of the Leaves"	Charles Bukowski	2:31
4.	"Anyone Lived in a Pretty How Town"	E. E. Cummings	4:02
5.	"Wild Nights"	Emily Dickinson	2:59
6.	"Summer Farm"	Norman MacCaig	3:41
7.	"The Triumph of Hunger"	Arthur Rimbaud	4:05
8.	"Lady Weeping at the Crossroads"	W. H. Auden	4:31
9.	"The Horses"	Edwin Muir	5:01
10.	"Song"	William Soutar	2:11

== Personnel ==
Credits are adapted from the I Shot the Albatross CD booklet.

- James Grant – voice (2, 4–10), electric guitar (1–2, 4, 6–9), acoustic guitar (1–2, 4–8, 10), bass (1–2, 4–6, 8–9), Prophet5 synthesizer (1), backing vocals (1–2, 4–7, 9), piano (2, 5), guitar (3), dobro (5), stylophone (7), bouzouki (8), keyboards (8–9)
- Monica Queen – voice (1), backing vocals (4)
- Stuart Nisbet – guitar (1)
- Dave Murricane – conductor (1, 3)
- Howard McGill – saxophone (2)
- Neil Yates – trumpet (2)
- Charles Bukowski – voice (3)
- James Mackintosh – drums (4, 9), tambourine (4)
- Paul McGeechan – organ (4), piano (4)
- Kevin McCrae – conductor (6)
- Donald Shaw – organ (6), piano (6)
- Herbie Hancock – piano (7)
- Joe Henderson – saxophone (7)
- Freddie Hubbard – trumpet (7)
- Ron Carter – bass (7)
- Lenny White – drums (7)

Production

- James Grant – producer (all tracks)
- Donald Shaw – producer (6)
- Paul McGeechan – mixing, mastering
- Kim Planert – recording

Other

- designiscentral.com – artwork
