= Love and Money (band) =

Scottish rock/soul/funk band

- Origin: Glasgow, Scotland
- Genres: Pop rock, sophisti-pop
- Years active: 1985–1994; 2011–present
- Members: James Grant; Paul McGeechan; Douglas MacIntyre; Gordon Wilson
- Past members: Bobby Paterson; Stuart Kerr

Love and Money are a Scottish rock/soul/funk band, formed in 1985 in Glasgow, Scotland. The band was formed by three former members of Friends Again (singer-songwriter and guitarist James Grant, drummer Stuart Kerr and keyboardist Paul McGeechan) along with bassist Bobby Paterson, who replaced Friends Again's Neil Cunningham and who had been a member of Set the Tone, a band previously signed to Island Records in 1983.

In their initial nine years together they recorded four moderately successful albums, three of which were released in the United States, and had six chart hits in the United Kingdom.

== All You Need Is... Love And Money ==
Signing to Phonogram's Mercury Records in the United Kingdom, they recorded "Candybar Express", with production from Duran Duran's Andy Taylor, and this recording became their first hit receiving airplay in the U.S. and reaching number 56 in the UK Singles Chart in the spring of 1986. Shortly afterwards they released their debut album, All You Need Is... produced by Tom Dowd but this failed to chart. Follow up singles "Dear John", "River of People" and "Love and Money" were released to modest success. In September 1986, the group played an Artists Against Apartheid concert at Barrowland Ballroom, Glasgow, alongside acts such as The Big Dish and Lloyd Cole. The band also had a support slot with U2 at Murrayfield Stadium, Edinburgh.

== Strange Kind of Love ==
The 1988 follow-up album Strange Kind of Love (which featured Toto's Jeff Porcaro on drums following the departure of Kerr, as well as Rick Derringer and an uncredited appearance from Donald Fagen) was overseen by Steely Dan producer Gary Katz, and featured the hit "Halleluiah Man", which helped to establish a sizeable following for the band. This single was a minor hit in UK (No. 63) but was more successful in Continental Europe and in Oceania, reaching the Top 50 (and sometimes the Top 40) in 1989; just missing the Top 20 in Italy. "Strange Kind of Love" and "Jocelyn Square" also charted in the UK, although they did not break into the Top 40.

The band toured to promote Strange Kind of Love, including the United States and Japan, and garnered support slots with Tina Turner, Simply Red and B. B. King. Part of the band's performance at the Eden Court Theatre in Inverness was filmed for BBC Scotland's Sounds of Eden programme. A half-hour set from the band also featured on the Night Network television show and they performed the "Strange Kind of Love" single on Wogan.

Strange Kind of Love, which has sold in excess of 250,000 copies worldwide, was re-released in April 2010, with added demos and new sleeve notes from James Grant, Paul McGeechan and Gary Katz.

== The Mother's Boy ==
The band, now supplemented by permanent drummer Gordon Wilson and rhythm guitarist Douglas MacIntyre, returned to the studio to record the follow-up, to be entitled The Mother's Boy, but the songs met disapproval from Phonogram. The release was scrapped and the band returned to the studio. Several of the tracks including proposed album opener, "Hubcap to Blue Town", "Blue Eyed World" (played on the Strange Kind of Love tour), and "True Believer", reappeared as B-sides to the singles from the eventual follow-up Dogs in the Traffic. "Pappa Death" and "Winter" also were included on Dogs in the Traffic, and "No Chicane" on Grant's solo debut Sawdust in My Veins. Other tracks, including "Amaranth", were released on the 2012 release, The Devil's Debt.

== Dogs in the Traffic ==
Dogs in the Traffic was included in the All Time Top 100 Scottish Pop and Rock albums in The Scotsman (at number 30). The band gave a pre-release playthrough of the album at City Halls in Candleriggs, Glasgow, which included an encore featuring Tom Waits' "Clap Hands" and Bob Dylan's "You Ain't Goin' Nowhere". Three singles were released from the album, "My Love Lives in a Dead House", the Wishing Waters EP on which "Looking for Angeline" was the lead track, and "Winter".

== Littledeath and split ==
Love and Money's fourth album, Littledeath (1993) was released independently on Iona Gold records and featured the single, "The Last Ship on the River". The album sold 25,000, around one tenth of the sales for Strange Kind of Love and the group were subsequently released from Mercury. Bassist Bobby Paterson had split from the band to form a career in bar management and did not feature on this album. The band's guitarist Douglas MacIntyre played bass on the album. The remainder of the band went their separate ways in 1994, although they did regroup for one final gig at Glasgow Barrowland on 23 December 1994 entitled 'Love and Money: RIP'.

== Reformation and The Devil's Debt ==
Love and Money reformed 'for one night only' for a successful sell out show at the Glasgow Royal Concert Hall as part of Celtic Connections 2011. They played the albums Strange Kind of Love and Dogs in the Traffic in their entireties, and dedicated the song "Walk The Last Mile" to bassist Bobby Paterson, who had died in 2006. The Strange Kind of Love portion of the show was later released on L&M recordings. It was announced in March 2011, that the band would continue their reunion with a show at the Clyde Auditorium in Glasgow on 4 December 2011.

The band previewed its fifth studio album The Devil's Debt to a sold-out show at King Tuts Wah Wah Hut in Glasgow on 5 May 2012. The album was released on Vertical Records in October 2012 to positive reviews.

Douglas Macintyre was featured in the 'Pop Band' episode of the CBeebies My Story programme in late 2012.

== Personnel ==
=== Bobby Paterson ===
Robert Armstrong Paterson was born in 1956 in Carntyne, Glasgow. In the 1970s, he recorded with Sandy McClelland and the Backline; in the 1980s with Set the Tone, who released a number of singles and an album on Island Records. The singles "Rap Your Love" and "Dance Sucker" were club hits at the time, with the latter remixed by Francois Kevorkian.

Following involvement in the original incarnation of Primal Scream, he became a member of Love and Money, where he remained for nine years. Leaving Love and Money before their album Littledeath was released, he moved into bar and club management in Glasgow, overlooking the clubs Expo and The Tunnel Club, before setting up and running the boutique hotel, Saint Jude's. More recently, he formed a new band with Adrian Barry and Bobby Bluebell from 1980s band The Bluebells, called the Poems. Their CD is entitled Young America.

He died in Glasgow on 23 July 2006.

=== James Grant ===
James Grant released his first solo album Sawdust in My Veins in 1998 and has released four further albums, My Thrawn Glory, I Shot the Albatross (a collection of poetry set to music), Holy Love, and Strange Flowers. The latter was released in February 2009 and Grant premièred the tracks at the Glasgow ABC venue as part of the 2009 Celtic Connections festival.

Grant also scored the film, The Near Room and has collaborated with Capercaillie's Karen Matheson, performing live and writing songs for her solo records. He released the James Grant & The Hallelujah Strings live album on Vertical in 2016, featuring Love and Money songs along with songs from his solo career. In 2017, he collaborated with producer Gordy Goudie on the Korvids album on Nang Records. In 2025, Grant released the Butler, Blake & Grant record with Norman Blake from Teenage Fanclub and Bernard Butler from Suede.

=== Paul McGeechan ===
Paul McGeechan has produced a number of high-profile artists and released the Starless record in 2016, a lushly orchestrated album featuring a number of guest vocalists, including Paul Buchanan (The Blue Nile), Karen Matheson (Capercaillie), Julie Fowlis and Chris Thomson (The Bathers), and recorded with the Prague Philharmonic Orchestra. Starless 2 followed in 2024.

== Discography ==
=== Studio albums ===
Year	Album	Peak positions		
Year	Album	UK	AUS	US
1986	All You Need Is...	—	—	—
1988	Strange Kind of Love	71	71	175
1991	Dogs in the Traffic	41	—	—
1993	Littledeath	—	—	—
2012	The Devil's Debt	—	—	—
"—" denotes releases that did not chart or were not released.

=== Compilations ===
- Cheap Pearls and Whisky Dreams – The Best of (1999)

=== Live albums ===
- Strange Kind of Love – Live in Glasgow (2011)

=== Re-issued albums ===
- Strange Kind of Love (2010 Remaster)

The album was re-issued by Cherry Red Records on 19 April 2010. It was remastered by Paul McGeechan from the original master tapes, and includes 6 unreleased demos and forewords from Grant, McGeechan and producer Gary Katz.

- Dogs In The Traffic (2022)

30th Anniversary reissue on vinyl and CD. CD contained six bonus tracks on an extra disc.

=== Singles ===
Year	Single	Peak positions								Album
Year	Single	UK	AUS	AUT	FRA	NZ	US Hot 100	US Adult	US Dance	Album
1986	"Candybar Express"	56	96	—	—	—	—	—	10	All You Need Is...Love and Money
1986	"Dear John"	103	—	—	—	—	—	—	—	All You Need Is...Love and Money
1987	"River of People"	82	—	—	—	—	—	—	—	All You Need Is...Love and Money
1987	"Love and Money"	68	—	—	—	—	—	—	—	All You Need Is...Love and Money
1988	"Halleluiah Man"	63	47	27	41	39	75	44	—	Strange Kind of Love
1989	"Strange Kind of Love"	45	76	—	—	—	—	—	—	Strange Kind of Love
1989	"Jocelyn Square"	51	—	—	—	—	—	—	—	Strange Kind of Love
1989	"Up Escalator"	79	—	—	—	—	—	—	—	Strange Kind of Love
1991	"My Love Lives in a Dead House"	83	—	—	—	—	—	—	—	Dogs in the Traffic
1991	"Looking for Angeline" (from the Wishing Waters E.P.)	109	—	—	—	—	—	—	—	Dogs in the Traffic
1991	"Winter"	52	—	—	—	—	—	—	—	Dogs in the Traffic
1994	"The Last Ship on the River"	—	—	—	—	—	—	—	—	Littledeath
2011	"This Is the Last Time"	—	—	—	—	—	—	—	—	The Devil's Debt
"—" denotes releases that did not chart or were not released.
