= Still Time (album) =

Studio album by Karen Matheson
- Released: 12 February 2021
- Recorded: ~2005–2020 (Note: «... Still Time [...] has been recorded over the last 15 years.») (Note: «[...] these songs were recorded over a 15 year period.»)
- Genre: Folk rock
- Length: 46:35
- Label: Vertical Records

Karen Matheson chronology
Urram (2015)	Still Time (2021)

Singles from Still Time
- 1. "Cassiopeia Coming Through" Released: 6 November 2020; 2. "Still Time" Released: 2 February 2021

Still Time is the fifth solo (studio) album by Karen Matheson, lead singer of the Scottish folk band Capercaillie, released on CD and vinyl on 12 February 2021.

== Overview ==
Folk Radio UK's music critic Billy Rough stated in his album review on 25 January 2021: «Still Time features a mix of traditional and contemporary tracks, many written by producer Donald Shaw, and a subtle and measured collection it is too.»

Folk Radio UK's music critic "FRUK Staff" stated about Still Time in his review on 6 November 2020 of the single "Cassiopeia Coming Through": «[Karen Matheson's] new album Still Time is a collection of contemporary and traditional-sounding songs featuring an intoxicating palette of sonic textures wrapped around that instantly recognisable voice. Featuring piano and production by Donald Shaw, this new album is a creative discovery from this summer’s unexpected lockdown.»

Still Time features four songs by James Grant – someone whose writing Karen Matheson has admired for some time ("Cassiopeia Coming Through", "The Glory Demon", "Little Gun" and "Laurel to Wreath"), two contributions from Robert Burns ("Lassie with the Lint White Locks" and "Ae Fond Kiss"), two from musical and life partner Donald Shaw ("Still Time" and "The Diamond Ring"), and one each from Brendan Graham ("Orphan Girl"), Si Kahn ("The Aragon Mill") and the Macdonald brothers of Runrig fame ("Recovery").

== Origins ==
Karen Matheson stated about Still Time: «10 years ago, I was working on a bunch of different tracks, unsure of what direction to go in when I found myself facing a number of personal challenges including the loss of both my parents. It felt right to concentrate on the Gaelic songs of my childhood, in tribute to what had given true shape to my life, resulting in the purely Gaelic release of Urram from 2015. We were then left with a body of work, waiting in the wings to be resurrected at a later date with my sore heart eased and my faith in humanity restored. Fast-forward a decade and while the world paused, bird song soared and banana bread baked, Still Time was re-born. With the help of some familiar, brilliant musicians who could accommodate the ' home-recording' situation we worked through lockdown. Somehow having time to reflect and consider music in a different way helped me finally finish the record and I am super proud of it!»

== Critical reception ==
Professional ratings
Review scores
Source	Rating
Folk Radio UK	very favourable
The Scotsman	4/5 stars
Spiral Earth	4/5 stars
Americana UK	7/10 medals
The Rocking Magpie (blog)	very favourable

On 25 January 2021, the new album received a warm review from the Folk Radio UK's music critic Billy Rough, stating: «It's a quiet, serious, considered album, but one which quickly, and tenderly, melts your heart.»

On his 2 February 2021 review in Americana UK, Gordon Sharpe praised the album, stating: «[Although] Still Time [...] has been recorded over the last 15 years, fortunately [...] it does not have the feel of odds and ends cobbled together in order to produce some, "product"», and «the best tracks on the album are marked by their more directly Scottish subject matter as well as the simplicity of the arrangements which allow Matheson's voice to shine more clearly. She has a lovely voice though it is not one you could call powerful. The album's best tracks are those with the sparsest instrumentation which serves to better highlight the singer», adding: «these tracks are notable by way of their subject matter, the writing, arrangements and the way Matheson's voice comes to the fore» and concluding: «those fans of Capercaillie and Matheson will know what to expect – this is well crafted, well-sung music that won't disappoint. To appropriate a Scottish metaphor, the impact is more akin to the sinuous quiet power of the lowland Tweed than it is the force and thunder of upland rivers such as the Orchy and the Etive.»

On 10 February 2021, the blog "The Rocking Magpie" wrote about Still Time: «I've found it a very pleasant change to find Karen Matheson hasn't actually written any of these songs, instead she gets to re-interpret and put her very own personality into another's words,» adding: «While not quite a retrospective of her solo career, you wouldn't guess that these songs were recorded over a 15 year period, which somehow goes to show the quality of Karen Matheson's singing style [and] partner Donald Shaw's guiding hand at the control panel,» and concluding: «There are very lazy comparisons I can make, but that's unfair on someone with a track record like Ms. Matheson already has, but I firmly believe that this album and collection of strangely beautiful songs has the capacity to cross-over into the mainstream, whatever that means these days.»

== Singles ==
The album lead single "Cassiopeia Coming Through" (a 4:30 edit of the album opening track which runs 5:15) was video premiered on 6 November 2020.

A second single, the eponymous "Still Time" (actually the 4:17 album edit) was released on 2 February 2021 as a SoundCloud streaming.

== Track by track review ==
- "Cassiopeia Coming Through" – written by James Grant. The blog "The Rocking Magpie" wrote about it: «[it] has more of a Dinner-Jazz vibe to my untutored ears [...] and that's a good thing,» adding: «Karen Matheson has not just a delightful voice, but a delicious one too» and: «the song itself rolls along like a gentle Spring breeze [...] and let's be honest when was the last time you heard a piano as lovely as this on a Folk song; and as for the inclusion of a Flugel Horn; well... it's a bloody masterstroke!»
- "The Aragon Mill" – written by musician and political activist Si Kahn in the early 1970s about the closing of the cotton mill in Aragon, Georgia.
- "Still Time" – written by Donald Shaw – «hints at Musical Theatre, especially the way Karen Matheson slides seamlessly from melody to chorus while a saxophone appears like a ghost in the background», and «[has] a haunting quality that is just perfect for a cold, wet Winter's evening» according to the blog "The Rocking Magpie".
- "Little Gun" and "The Glory Demon" – written by James Grant – are two songs across which – according to the blog "The Rocking Magpie" – Karen Matheson weaves her magic, with the latter unravelling like shroud in the wind; and when it finally played out for the third or fourth time [the listener] is left totally exhausted but strangely exhilarated too... such is the way she conveys this tragic story.
- "Lassie With the Lint White Locks" – written by Robert Burns – carries a similar emotional charge [than "Ae Fond Kiss"] with a simple final image and clear language. The blog "The Rocking Magpie" wrote about it: «Karen's crystal clear execution of "Lassie with the Lint White Locks" has come as close as anyone to make a convert of me.»
- "Recovery" – written by Runrig's Mcdonald brothers – revisits the Crofters' revolt in Glendale on the Isle of Skye which forced the authorities to negotiate rather than intimidate (though part of the deal was prison sentences for a token few, including Sir John Macpherson MacLeod, of Duirinish, K.C.S.I., who was seen as one of the ring leaders). These actions led to the Crofters Holdings (Scotland) Act 1886 which started to address the grievances of the poor and dispossessed against the rich landowners. It is clear from the sleeve notes that this song and Runrig both had a profound effect on Karen Matheson in the early 1980s, celebrating, as it does, the Gaidhealtachd (the Gaelic culture of the Highlands and Islands).
- "Laurel to a Wreath" – written by James Grant – «is a love song of sorts which fits perfectly around Karen Matheson's emotional and honeyed voice [and] carefully and tentatively takes us towards AOR, but somehow pulls back from the brink» and, like "Still Time", «[has] a haunting quality that is just perfect for a cold, wet Winter's evening» according to the blog "The Rocking Magpie".
- "Orphan Girl" – written by Irish writer Brendan Graham – tells us about the hopes of a child desperate to be taken from Ireland to Australia. This exodus grew from charitable and philanthropic motives with conditions in the workhouses notably hard and the famine years in Ireland at their peak. The diaspora of the Irish was even more significant than that of the Scots though in this instance the potential emigrant has great hopes. The blog "The Rocking Magpie" wrote about it: «the fragile and achingly beautiful "Orphan Girl" about the tragic tale of thousands of young orphan girls in Ireland in the 1840s transported to the New World that was [then] Australia has [enough] a theatrical feel to it [...] to imagine this song [as] the cornerstone of a Hit Musical.»
- "Ae Fond Kiss" – also written by Robert Burns – which so memorably closed the Glasgow Games – closes the album and speaks clearly of the intensity of lost love. The blog "The Rocking Magpie" wrote about it: «the simple arrangement on "Ae Fond Kiss" creates a bewitching melancholy that I've not heard in this song before.

== Track listing ==
1. "Cassiopeia Coming Through" – 5:15 (James Grant)
2. "The Aragon Mill" – 4:41 (Si Kahn – 1974)
3. "Still Time" – 4:17 (Donald Shaw)
4. "Little Gun" – 3:31 (James Grant)
5. "The Diamond Ring" – 3:05 (Donald Shaw)
6. "Lassie with the Lint White Locks" – 3:30 (Robert Burns)
7. "The Glory Demon" – 4:29 (James Grant)
8. "Recovery" – 4:38 (Rory Macdonald, Calum Macdonald – 1981)
9. "Laurel to a Wreath" – 3:51 (James Grant)
10. "Orphan Girl" – 5:06 (Brendan Graham – 2012)
11. "Ae Fond Kiss" – 4:11 (Robert Burns)

Writing credits – see as indicated.

== Personnel ==
Musicians

- Karen Matheson – Lead vocals
- Donald Shaw – Piano, Accordion, Harmonium, Samples
- James Grant – Guitars (1,4,7,8,9) Dobro (2,3), Vocals
- Hannah Fisher – Fiddle, Vocals
- Ewen Vernal – Bass (1,4,7,9)
- Sorren MacLean – Guitars (1,3,4,6,10), Vocals
- Anna Massie – Mandolin (7)
- Alyn Cosker – Drums (1,3,7,9)
- John Doyle – Guitar, Bouzouki (2,5,10), Vocal (10)
- Fraser Fifield – Saxophone (3)
- Ryan Quigley – Flugel Horn (1)
- Rudi Di Groot – Cello (2,10)
- Michael McGoldrick – Whistle (8)
- Dirk Powell – Banjo (5)
- James MacKintosh – Drums (5)
- Clockwork Strings – String Section ("Ae Fond Kiss")
