= Littledeath =

Studio album by Love and Money
- Released: 1993
- Length: 52:57
- Label: Iona Gold; Mesa Records (US)
- Producer: Love and Money

Love and Money chronology
Dogs in the Traffic (1991)	Littledeath (1993)	Cheap Pearls and Whisky Dreams – The Best Of (1999)

Littledeath is the fourth studio album by Scottish band Love and Money, released by Iona Gold in December 1993. In the US, it was released by Mesa Records on 19 July 1994. The album produced one single, "The Last Ship on the River".

== Background ==
Despite the strained relationship between Love and Money and their label, Phonogram, the band were commissioned to record their fourth studio album following the release of Dogs in the Traffic in 1991. However, when the band presented approximately six new tracks to Phonogram, the label felt they were not commercial enough and lacked hit potential. The two parties were unable to come to an agreement, resulting in Love and Money leaving the label in late 1992 and completing the recording of Littledeath themselves.

Once completed, the band secured a deal to release Littledeath on the Glasgow-based independent label Iona Gold. Douglas MacIntyre told the Evening Express in 1994, "The freedom we now have is very important. We didn't want to sign to another major label. We're just more interested in writing good songs rather than having hit singles. When the opportunity to work with Iona came along it was a real blessing."

Speaking to the Edinburgh Evening News in 1993, James Grant summarised, "The album is like the concise history of popular music according to Love and Money. We are wearing our influences on our sleeves a bit more. Previously the music I liked and the music I was expected to make were totally different things." He also revealed to the Daily Record, "The songs were conceived in a more organic way. The fact that we had no commercial restraints placed on us at all meant that, musically, we didn't have to hold back." In regards to the album's title, Grant told The List, "I'd like it to mean like a kind of catharsis."

Littledeath was well-received critically but failed to achieve commercial success. Love and Money split in 1994 and Grant embarked on a solo career. In 2011, Grant reflected on the album, calling it "good, but flawed". He added, "I think that is partly down to the production. There are some very good songs on it, but I am not sure about the whole album. It is a record that I am very fond of, and it is a record that is very close to my heart."

== Critical reception ==
Professional ratings
Review scores
Source	Rating
AllMusic	3/5 stars
Q	3/5 stars

Upon its release, Scotland on Sunday wrote, "In these bleak tales of romantic disappointment and guilt, Grant avoids self-indulgence by turning the emotional scattergun on himself. The end result is even darker than Dogs in the Traffic, but no less rewarding." The Fife Free Press commented that the "splendid album from the criminally underrated Scots outfit continu[es] the acoustic approach adopted on Dogs in the Traffic", with the band in "stunning form throughout this glorious set".

Stuart Maconie of Q called Littledeath a "typically swish affair comprising easy on the ear tunes played with discreet soulfulness". He continued, "Jazzier and more acoustic in execution than previous releases, its non-perspiring politeness can become anaesthetising but more often it has the comfortable feel of a very expensive shirt." Mike Davies of The Birmingham Post stated that, although the "downbeat, wounded and sometimes self-loathing tones of songs like 'Love Is Like a Wave', 'Bitches Beach' and 'Ugly As Sin' are hardly likely to have you skipping round the room", those who have "followed the band's polished fusion of white soul and urban folk over the years won't be disappointed by this latest excursion".

In a retrospective review, Alex Henderson of AllMusic commented, "Littledeath demonstrates that the band still had a lot to offer [before their breakup]. The writing is consistently strong, and Grant is expressive throughout the CD. Creatively, this album is successful; commercially, it didn't do Love & Money justice in 1994. Nonetheless, Littledeath was a rewarding swan song for the Scottish outfit."

== Track listing ==
All tracks are written by James Grant

No.	Title	Length
1.	"Littledeath (Reprise)"	1:10
2.	"The Last Ship on the River"	4:40
3.	"I'll Catch You When You Fall"	4:02
4.	"Keep Looking for the Light"	4:30
5.	"Pray for Love"	3:26
6.	"Don't Be Afraid of the Dark"	2:56
7.	"Ugly As Sin"	6:14
8.	"Love Is Like a Wave"	3:43
9.	"Bitches Breach"	4:37
10.	"Kiss of Life"	5:49
11.	"Sweet Black Luger"	5:05
12.	"What Time Is the Last Train"	2:51
13.	"Littledeath"	4:14

== Personnel ==
Love and Money

- James Grant – vocals (tracks 2–12), backing vocals (tracks 2–8, 10–11), guitar (tracks 2–13)
- Douglas MacIntyre – bass (tracks 2–12), mandolin (tracks 2, 13), guitar (track 3), backing vocals (tracks 4–8, 10–11)
- Paul McGeechan – keyboards (tracks 2–13), piano (track 12), accordion (track 13)
- Gordon Wilson – drums (tracks 2–12), percussion (tracks 8, 11)

Additional musicians

- David McLuskey, Ken McLuskey – backing vocals (track 2)
- Gregor Reid – congas (track 2)
- David Crichton – fiddle (track 2)
- Gavin McComb – backing vocals (tracks 4–5, 11)
- Gwen Stewart – backing vocals (tracks 4–5, 7)
- Fraser Speirs – harmonica (tracks 4–5, 11)
- Phil Bancroft, The Weir Brothers – horns (tracks 4, 7)
- Ronnie Goodman – triangle (track 4), percussion (tracks 5, 7, 9)
- Louise Rutkowski – vocals (tracks 6, 13)
- Stuart MacIntyre – vocals (track 13)

Production

- Love and Money – producers, mixing
- Brian Young – engineer, mixing
- Gavin McComb, Keith Mitchell – engineers
- Kenny Paterson – additional engineer
- Bob McDowall – mastering

Other

- Craig Mulholland – front cover painting
- Jim McLean – photography

== "The Last Ship on the River" ==
"The Last Ship on the River"

Single by Love and Money

from the album Littledeath
- Released: 25 April 1994
- Length: 4:40
- Label: Iona Gold
- Songwriter(s): James Grant
- Producer(s): Love and Money

Love and Money singles chronology
"Winter" (1991)	"The Last Ship on the River" (1994)	"This Is the Last Time" (2011)

"The Last Ship on the River" was released on 25 April 1994 as the only single from Littledeath. It was issued on CD with three bonus tracks: "Sweet Black Luger" from Littledeath, the exclusive track "Without Her" and a live recording of the traditional song "Will the Circle Be Unbroken", courtesy of Clyde 1.

Grant has described "The Last Ship on the River" as a song which "deals with the urban [and economic] decline in Glasgow". He told The Paisley Daily Express in 1994, "The change in the economic landscape of Glasgow is very profound. Shipbuilding has all but disappeared. This song captures some of this feeling as I've always been very close spiritually to the city."

Upon its release, Music & Media praised the song as the "most charming midtempo rocker [which is] bolstered by a distinct Celtic feel". They added that the song "deserves recognition far beyond its native Scotland" and also recommended the "rocking" "Sweet Black Luger" and the "lively version" of "Will the Circle Be Unbroken". Speaking of the extra tracks on the single, Phil Trotter of The Herald described "Without Her" as "languid blues" and noted the "weighty blast" of "Sweet Black Luger".

=== Track listing ===
CD single

1. "The Last Ship on the River" – 4:40
2. "Sweet Black Luger" – 5:05
3. "Without Her" – 4:32
4. "Will the Circle Be Unbroken" – 3:28
