= Time to Fall =

Studio album by Karen Matheson
- Released: 13 May 2002; 23 July 2002
- Genre: Folk rock
- Length: 48:48
- Label: Vertical
- Producer: Donald Shaw

Karen Matheson chronology
The Dreaming Sea (1996)	Time to Fall (2002)	Downriver (2005)

Professional ratings
Review scores
Source	Rating
Allmusic	4/5 stars

Time to Fall is the second solo (studio) album by Karen Matheson, lead singer of the Scottish band Capercaillie.

== Track listing ==
1. "All the Flowers of the Bough" – 4:31
2. "Morning" – 4:40
3. "Time to Fall" – 4:08
4. "My Whispered Reason" – 2:11
5. "Bonnie Jean" - 5:10
6. "Goodbye Phoebe" – 3:21
7. "An Ataireachd Ard (The Surge of the Sea)" – 5:17
8. "Speed of Love" – 5:02
9. "Moonchild" – 3:48
10. "Moch Di Luain" – 2:53
11. "Hoping for You" - 3:02
12. "World Stood Still" - 4:17

== Personnel ==
- James Grant - acoustic guitar, electric guitar, backing vocals
- Bobby Henry - backing vocals, electric guitar
- Ewen Vernal - double bass
- Quee MacArthur - bass
- James Mackintosh - drums, percussion
- Paul McGeechan - keyboards
- Tim O'Brien - vocals (track 12)
- Bobby Paterson - bass
- Donald Shaw - Wurlitzer piano, piano, synthesizer, accordion
- Neil Yates - trumpet
- BT Scottish Ensemble - strings
