= Strange Kind of Love (song) =

Single by Love and Money

from the album Strange Kind of Love
- Released: 9 January 1989 (UK)
- Length: 5:14 (album version); 4:15 (radio edit)
- Label: Fontana; Mercury
- Songwriter: James Grant
- Producer: Gary Katz

Love and Money singles chronology
"Halleluiah Man" (1988)	"Strange Kind of Love" (1989)	"Jocelyn Square" (1989)

"Strange Kind of Love" is a song by Scottish band Love and Money, which was released on 9 January 1989 as the second single from their second studio album, Strange Kind of Love. The song was written by James Grant and produced by Gary Katz. "Strange Kind of Love" reached number 45 in the UK Singles Chart and remained in the top 100 for five weeks.

== Release ==
To promote the single, Love and Money embarked on a short UK tour between 25 January and 2 February 1989.

== Music video ==
The song's music video was directed by Pete Cornish and produced by Pete Chambers.

== Critical reception ==
On its release as a single, Jerry Smith of Music Week described "Strange Kind of Love" as "classy stuff" and noted the "honeyed vocals and deftly twanged guitar within a sophisticated sound". He concluded the song "certainly deserves to bring them to wider attention". Mark Shaw of Then Jerico, as guest reviewer for Number One, awarded four out of five stars. He commented, "This is really good although it sounds like their other stuff. The voice reminds me of Skin from Hipsway." Ian Forsyth of the Press and Journal awarded the song four out of five stars, describing it as "a silky smooth offering of white soul" that "far surpasses most of the dross [in] the singles chart". He added, "At last, the band have got the hit record formula just right. If it isn't a huge success, there is absolutely no justice in the world."

Michael Chappell of the Newark Advertiser praised the song as "strong and moody with a good soul feel" and predicted it would be a "definite hit if Radio One deigns to play it". Penny Kiley of the Liverpool Echo considered it to be "an unsurprising smooth song with a touch of class above the usual pop soul, distinguished if not distinctive". She added that the B-side, "Looking for Angeline", is "an admirably simple acoustic song with reliance on just the words and a guitar that's almost bluesy at times". Andy Strickland of Record Mirror was critical of the song's elevation to single status, commenting, "Love and Money have stubbornly refused to have a hit single and this one sounds unlikely to break the sequence. Not that there's anything particularly offensive but it should never have been a single."

In the US, Billboard described the song as "elegant, expertly produced and performed pop with R&B underpinnings". They added that it "recalls the engaging sound" of the Swiss duo Double.

== Track listing ==
7-inch single (UK and France)

1. "Strange Kind of Love" – 5:14
2. "Looking for Angeline" – 3:48

7-inch promotional single (UK)

1. "Strange Kind of Love" (Edit) – 4:15
2. "Strange Kind of Love" (Full Version) – 5:14

7-inch single (US)

1. "Strange Kind of Love" – 4:15
2. "Set the Night On Fire" – 4:16

7-inch single (Australia)

1. "Strange Kind of Love" – 5:14
2. "Looking for Angeline" – 3:48

12-inch single and limited edition box-set cassette (UK)

1. "Strange Kind of Love" – 5:14
2. "Looking for Angeline" – 3:48
3. "Set the Night On Fire" – 4:16
4. "Scapegoat" – 3:48

12-inch promotional single (UK)

1. "Strange Kind of Love" (Radio Edit) – 4:15
2. "Strange Kind of Love" (Album Edit) – 5:15
3. "Halleluiah Man" (Live) – 3:55

CD single (UK and Europe)

1. "Strange Kind of Love" – 5:17
2. "Looking for Angeline" – 3:51
3. "Set the Night On Fire" – 4:19
4. "Scapegoat" – 3:50

CD promotional single (US)

1. "Strange Kind of Love" (7" Version) – 4:15
2. "Strange Kind of Love" (LP Version) – 5:14

== Personnel ==
Credits are adapted from the UK CD single liner notes and the Strange Kind of Love booklet.

Love and Money

- James Grant – lead vocals, backing vocals, electric guitar
- Paul McGeechan – keyboards, piano
- Bobby Paterson – bass, backing vocals

Additional musicians on "Strange Kind of Love"

- Ronnie Goodman – percussion
- Frank Floyd – backing vocals
- Beatrice Colin – backing vocals
- Leroy Clouden – additional drums

Production

- Gary Katz – producer on "Strange Kind of Love" and "Scapegoat"
- Bill Price – mixing on "Strange Kind of Love" and "Scapegoat"
- Wayne Yurgelun – engineer on "Strange Kind of Love" and "Scapegoat"
- Eric Eckley – assistant engineer on "Strange Kind of Love" and "Scapegoat"
- Bob Ludwig – mastering on "Strange Kind of Love" and "Scapegoat"
- Love and Money – producers on "Looking for Angeline" and "Set the Night On Fire"
- Brian Young – engineer on "Looking for Angeline" and "Set the Night On Fire"

Other

- Stylorouge – design, art direction
- Avid Images – photography

== Charts ==
=== Weekly charts ===
Chart (1989)	Peak position
Australia (ARIA)	76
Italy Airplay (Music & Media)	6
UK Singles (OCC)	45
