= My Thrawn Glory =

Studio album by James Grant
- Released: December 2000
- Length: 49:50
- Label: Vertical
- Producer: Donald Shaw; James Grant

James Grant chronology
| Sawdust in My Veins (1998) | My Thrawn Glory (2000) | I Shot the Albatross (2002) |

My Thrawn Glory is the second solo studio album by Scottish singer-songwriter James Grant, released in the UK by Vertical on 11 December 2000.

During February 2000, BBC Radio 2 picked My Thrawn Glory as an "album of the week". A single, "Hey Renée", was released in the UK on 2 April 2001. The song achieved some play on BBC Radio 2.

== Critical reception ==
Professional ratings
Review scores
| Source | Rating |
|---|---|
| The Guardian | 3/5 stars |
| Dotmusic | 3.5/5 stars |

On its release, James McNair of Mojo praised My Thrawn Glory for being "all that fans would expect and more". He wrote, "Grant's poetic lyrics don't squander a syllable, and with a dark night of the soul here and a sustaining epiphany there, much of what he conveys is a bit like life. Musically, there's an increasingly effortless classicism at play." Gary Crossing of Dotmusic described the album as a "romantic, life-affirming collection, awash with warm, gentle and spacious country-tinged rock tunes" and "laid-back, reflective, painstakingly crafted and tenderly touching". He praised Grant's "rich, dark and velvety croon" for "having seldom sounded better" and added that "crisp acoustic strumming, lush strings, lonely bar-room piano and subtle brass are the order of the day here".

Neil Spencer of The Observer felt that Malcolm's mixing had resulted in "something of the Blue Nile's slow, swooning style" to be found on the album, but added "Grant's rich tenor voice and stoic outlook is his own". He described the album's mood as "reflective" and added that the "only perverse note is Grant's habit of sliding into mid-Atlantic twang". John Aizlewood of The Guardian described it as a "a lush, string-fuelled album", but one that is "too bloodless", with its "clinical Catholicism [being] its downfall". He noted the wide variety of styles, with the material "nod[ding] variously towards country, AOR, kitsch, Tin Pan Alley", as well as Matt Johnson on "Blood Is Sweeter Than Honey". He described Grant's voice as "clear and deep", but added it "rarely succeeds in making the emotional connection". Aizlewood picked "Darkcountry" as the best track, noting that it "broods convincingly".

== Track listing ==
All tracks are written by James Grant except "I See All of You Now" by Grant and Donald Shaw, and "Blood Is Sweeter than Honey" by Grant and Douglas MacIntyre

| No. | Title | Notes | Length |
|---|---|---|---|
| 1. | "Minus 10" | | 1:33 |
| 2. | "Belle of My Burlesque" | | 4:04 |
| 3. | "Does It All Add Up to Nothing" | | 3:17 |
| 4. | "Darkcountry" | | 4:47 |
| 5. | "Jacqueline's Shoes" | | 4:55 |
| 6. | "Lodestar Rising" | | 2:52 |
| 7. | "Hey Renée" | | 3:58 |
| 8. | "I See All of You Now" | | 3:47 |
| 9. | "Religion" | | 5:09 |
| 10. | "Blood Is Sweeter Than Honey" | | 5:03 |
| 11. | "My Thrawn Glory" | | 5:31 |
| 12. | "Going Blank" | Unlisted bonus track | 4:54 |

== Personnel ==
Credits are adapted from the My Thrawn Glory CD booklet.

- James Grant – vocals, guitars, occasional bass
- Donald Shaw – Wurlitzer, piano, accordion, noises
- Ewen Vernal – bass, double bass
- James Mackintosh – drums, percussion
- The BT Scottish Ensemble – strings
- Kevin McCrae – string arrangement, string conductor
- Karen Matheson – backing vocals
- Neil Yates – trumpet, flugelhorn
- Howard McGill – saxophones
- Wilf Taylor – tambourine, shaker

Production

- Donald Shaw, James Grant – producers
- Kim Planert, Grant Milne – engineer
- Paul McGeechan – additional programming
- Calum Malcolm – mixing, mastering
- Robin Rankin – string recording

Other

- Tank Design – design
- Craig Mackay – photography
