= Urram =

Studio album by Karen Matheson
- Released: 28 September 2015 (Digital) 16 October 2015 (CD) (worldwide) 30 October 2015 (CD) (France) or 27 November 2015 (CD) (France) (Note: It is unclear whether the album was initially made available in France on 30 October 2015 via Amazon or on 27 November 2015 via Leclerc.)
- Genre: Folk rock
- Length: 54:55
- Label: Vertical Records (VERTCD102) (worldwide) Keltia Musique (France)

Karen Matheson chronology
Downriver (2005)	Urram (2015)	Still Time (2021)

Professional ratings
Review scores
Source	Rating
Folk Radio UK	very favourable
Herald Scotland	very favourable
The Scotsman	4/5 stars
Trad' Mag	5/5 stars

Urram (Gaelic for "Respect" as it is subtitled on the album front cover) is the fourth solo (studio) album by Karen Matheson, lead singer of the Scottish folk band Capercaillie, released on CD on 16 October 2015.

== Overview ==
This Karen Matheson's solo project is a musical love letter to her families' Hebridean roots, with a collection of timeless Gaelic songs that evoke the character and atmosphere of Island life, through work songs, love songs, lullabies, mouth music and evocative poems to the surroundings.

As Folk Radio UK's music critic Neil McFadyen stated in his Karen Matheson interview on 15 October 2015: «Heritage, family, poetry and friendship have all been significant factors during the [new album] creative process which started with an unexpected journey through family history, progressed to a treasury of Hebridean music and culture, and culminated in recordings that saw Karen united with old friends and forging new, exotic musical partnerships.»

As Herald Scotland's music critic Rob Adams stated on 18 October 2015 in his review of the new album : «Karen Matheson's latest solo album [...] is a collection of songs both traditional and from the bardic canon that simultaneously looks inward and outward.»

== Origins ==
Regarding the genesis of Urram, Karen Matheson recalled in July 2015: «This album came about after finding old photographs when my parents died. They sent me on a journey of discovery about their early lives, their ancestors, the tales of hardship, emigration and the losses of war, which compelled me to connect musically with what was important to them. The songs themselves are a mixture of those learnt as a child and songs gathered from the amazing archives of digitized recordings by the School of Scottish Studies. It is the first time that I have recorded a solo album of purely Gaelic material and it's been a joy to collaborate with such great musicians from the World music scene.»

In an interview by Neil McFadyen on 15 October 2015 for Folk Radio UK, Karen Matheson explained further: «I had been in the middle of a solo album when my mother got ill. [The album] was the usual mix of English contemporary song and traditional material, but the subsequent emotional journey made me want to explore the more traditional elements and the passing down of a culture and a heritage. The parallel between the Gaelic culture and that of other indigenous cultures was key. [...] The opportunity to work with Seckou Keita and Soumik Datta was very exciting. The ancient sounds of the African harp and the Indian sarod sit so beautifully with the traditional Gaelic melodies.» [...] «Things have gone full circle in that [Capercaillie and I] we started out with purely Gaelic trad material, went on to explore more contemporary song and now I find myself driven to look back again at the things that have made me who I am, the culture my parents left me, and the humbling effect of being able to sing these [old] songs.»

In his Karen Matheson interview, Neil McFadyen added: «Ten years on from [her previous solo album Downriver], Karen [Matheson] has [recorded] her fourth solo album and, perhaps surprisingly, her first to be composed entirely of Gaelic song. There is, of course, a very good reason for this. The main inspiration behind the album came as a result of exploring some very old family photographs that came from her late parents. The ensuing voyage of family discovery resulted in Urram (Respect). Many of the photo's adorning the sleeve of the album were unearthed by Karen at the time her parents both passed away within a short time of each other.»

In his review of the new album on 18 October 2015, Herald Scotland's music critic Rob Adams also explained: «Karen Matheson's latest solo album – her first album of all Gaelic material – is inspired by the recent loss of her parents and the music and stories that accompanied their early lives and those of their ancestors.»

Thus, the passing of Karen Matheson's parents and the discovery of the old photos were crucial factors leading to the all Gaelic orientation of the new album.

== Album cover ==
Album cover photography by Jannica Honey.

== Critical reception ==
On 1 October 2015, the new album received a warm review from the Folk Radio UK's music critic Neil McFadyen, calling it an «outstanding new album» and stating: «With the release of her fourth solo album, Urram, Karen [Matheson] takes the music and song of the Hebridean islands, mixes it with inspiration from her own family history, injects influences from three continents, and presents an album that is inventive, unique and utterly captivating.» Moreover, upon the release of the new album, Folk Radio UK made in October 2015 Karen Matheson their "artist of the month".

On 18 October 2015, Herald Scotland's music critic Rob Adams stated: «Karen Matheson's latest solo album [...] is the voice of Capercaillie exploring and revisiting her roots but with her relaxed, quietly commanding singing partnered superbly by musicians and instruments from outside her tradition. Soumik Datta's marvellously searching, soulful sarod playing brings out the heartbreak in opening waulking song, "Gura mise tha gu dubhach"'s dark narrative [while] the more humorous tale of "Ca na dh'fhag thu m'fhichead gini" steps all the more lightly as Seckou Keita's kora dances around Matheson's lightsome vocal. Elsewhere, Brendan Power's harmonica and Sorren MacLean's electric guitar perform similar roles in arrangements that also feature strings, courtesy of Mr McFall's Chamber, and a well-tempered band - all expertly piloted by pianist, accordionist and producer Donald Shaw.»

On 20 October 2015, Urram received a four star album review (out of 5) from The Scotsman's music critic Jim Gilchrist, stating: «In her first solo album of purely Gaelic material, Karen Matheson delves into her family's past, their songs and others gleaned from archive recordings. At the same time, she's enlisted the musicianship not only of usual suspects such as husband and producer Donald Shaw on piano and Ewen Vernal on bass, but the strings of Mr McFall's Chamber and the more exotic sounds of Seckou Keita on kora or African harp-lute, and Indian slide guitarist Soumik Datta. The result combines the personal with some highly cosmopolitan connections. Matheson's singing is as warm-toned and beautifully nuanced as ever in songs such as the yearning of "'Eilean Fraoich" or "Cadal cha Dean mi". Occasionally, there's a risk of over-egging the pudding, as when a waulking song risks smothering in lush strings and the plangent whine of sarod. Elsewhere however, Keita's kora rings effectively through a Barra flyting song while the ensemble builds up a fine head of steam as east and west skip together through some puirt à beul.»

In the January–February 2016 issue of (French magazine) Trad' Mag, folk critic Philippe Cousin awarded Urram full marks (giving the album a "Bravo!!!" award), praising the album's «thirteen tracks of pure beauty sublimated by Karen's crystalline voice.» and describing Urram as «a sensitive and stylish album with a modern sound which proves once again Karen Matheson's immense talent.»

In his 6 November 2020 article about the lead single "Cassiopeia Coming Through" from Karen Matheson's following album Still Time (later released on 12 February 2021), Folk Radio UK's music critic "FRUK Staff" stated: «Karen Matheson's last studio album Urram was released in 2015 and was hailed by Neil McFadyen, in his Folk Radio UK review, as the 'next step in a fascinating journey' on which Karen united the voices of the Hebrides with traditional and classical musicians from Scotland, Senegal, and India.»

== Track listing ==
1. "Gura mise tha gu dubhach" - 4:58 (5:08) (Trad. Arr Shaw/Matheson)
2. "A' Bhirlinn Bharrach" - 4:30 (4:31) (Trad. Arr Shaw/Matheson)
3. "Ca na dh'fhag thu m'fhichead gini" - 4:02 (4:07) (Trad. Arr Shaw/Matheson)
4. "Ci an Fhidheall/Cupair thu, taillear thu" - 3:55 (3:59) (Trad. Arr Shaw/Matheson)
5. "Urnaigh a bhan Thigreach" ("The Tigrean Woman's Prayer") - 3:30 (3:33) (Words: Catriona Montgomery / Music: Donald Shaw - Arr. Robert McFall)
6. "Cha teid mor a Bharraigh Bhronach" - 3:49 (3:53) (Trad. Arr Shaw/Matheson)
7. "Maol Ruanaidh Ghlinneachain" - 4:08 (4:11) (Trad. Arr Shaw/Matheson)
8. "Saoil a mhor am pos thu" - 4:20 (4:23) (Trad. Arr Shaw/Matheson)
9. "Taladh Throndairnis" - 3:37 (3:44) (Neil Matheson arr. Robert McFall)
10. "Chuir iad an t-suil a Pilot ban" - 3:36 (3:39) (Duncan MacDougal)
11. "'Eilean Fraoich" - 4:47 (4:50) (William MacKenzie)
12. "S i nochd a'chiad oidche 'n fhoghair" - 3:00 (3:02) (Trad. Arr Shaw/Matheson)
13. "Cadal cha Dean mi" - 5:52 (5:55) (Trad. Arr Shaw/Matheson)
- Off brackets are the durations as displayed on the album back cover.
- In brackets are the correct durations.

== Personnel ==
Musicians

- Karen Matheson – Lead vocals
- Innes White – Guitar & Mandolin
- Sorren MacLean – Acoustic & Electric Guitar
- Donald Shaw – Piano & Production
- Ewan Vernal - Double Bass
- Matheu Watson - Bouzouki & Fiddle
- Brendan Power - Harmonica

Guest musicians

- Seckou Keita (Senegal) – African kora on tracks 3, 7, 8, 11 & 12 & Percussion on tracks 6 & 12
- Soumik Datta (India) – Sarod on tracks 1, 4, 12 & 13
- John Doyle - Guitar on track 8
- Anna Massie - Guitar on track 8
- Alyn Cosker - Percussion on track 8
- Michael McGoldrick - flute on track 9
- Signy Jakobsdottir - percussion on track 13
- Scotland's Mr.McFall's Chamber group (string quartet) – Strings on tracks 5 & 9
