= Up Escalator =

Single by Love and Money

from the album Strange Kind of Love
- Released: 16 October 1989
- Length: 4:11 (album version); 3:51 (single version); 6:05 (extended version)
- Label: Fontana
- Songwriter(s): James Grant
- Producer(s): Gary Katz

Love and Money singles chronology
"Jocelyn Square" (1989)	"Up Escalator" (1989)	"My Love Lives in a Dead House" (1991)

"Up Escalator" is a song by Scottish band Love and Money, which was released in 1989 as the fourth and final single from their second studio album Strange Kind of Love (1988). The song was written by James Grant and produced by Gary Katz. "Up Escalator" reached number 79 in the UK Singles Chart and remained in the Top 100 for two weeks.

== Release ==
For its release as a single, "Up Escalator" was remixed by Chris Lord-Alge. The B-side "Soon" and the two additional tracks on the 12-inch and CD versions, "Thistlekiss" and "History", were all new tracks exclusive to the single. At the time of its release, the band revealed that the three new tracks marked the beginning of their move towards a more blues and country-orientated sound.

Grant revealed that "Soon" was a difficult song for the band to complete. He told The Kilmarnock Standard, "[It] had been a thorn in our side for some time – we simply could not get it together. We broke out the cheap champagne the night it was completed." "Thistlekiss" originated as a "ragtime tune" that bassist Bobby Paterson had written. While recording Strange Kind of Love in New York, Grant decided to develop the song and "display the hammier side of my nature". He described the song at the time as being "the most relaxed I've been on record without external sedation". Grant was inspired to write "History" after he was unable to see his sister and her husband when they travelled from Canada to Dundee to attend a family gathering. Grant wrote the song in the summer of 1989 "by way of an apology".

"Up Escalator" received airplay on BBC Radio 1 after being added to the station's B-list.

== Critical reception ==
On its release as a single, Iestyn George of Record Mirror described "Up Escalator" as "a typical example of Love and Money's funked up brand of R&B". He felt the band's material in general failed to live up to Grant's earlier work with Friends Again and predicted the song would fail to become a hit, stating, "I'll eat my record collection if this is a hit". Marcus Hodge of the Cambridge Evening News felt the song had "more than enough hooks even if it does not quite have the atmosphere of [the band's] earlier singles". He added that the song's "urgency compensates for any shallowness".

== Track listing ==
7-inch single (UK and Europe)

1. "Up Escalator" – 3:51
2. "Soon" – 4:34

Cassette single (UK and Europe)

1. "Up Escalator" (Extended Mix) – 6:05
2. "Soon" – 4:34

12-inch single (UK)

1. "Up Escalator" (Extended Mix) – 6:05
2. "Soon" – 4:37
3. "Thistlekiss" – 1:58
4. "History" – 2:22

CD single (Four Songs from Love and Money) (UK and Europe)

1. "Up Escalator" – 3:51
2. "Soon" – 4:37
3. "Thistlekiss" – 1:58
4. "History" – 2:22

== Personnel ==
Credits are adapted from the UK CD single liner notes and the Strange Kind of Love booklet.

Love and Money

- James Grant – lead vocals, backing vocals, electric guitar, horn arrangement
- Paul McGeechan – organ
- Bobby Paterson – bass, backing vocals, horn arrangement

Additional musicians on "Up Escalator"

- Jeff Porcaro – drums
- Ronnie Goodman – percussion
- Paul Griffin – clavinet
- Dave Tofani – horns
- Don Brooks – harmonica
- Ronnie Cuber, Dave Bargeron, Lou Sollof – horns
- Merle Miller, Kati McGunigle – backing vocals
- Rick Derringer – slide guitar
- Dave Chesky – horn arrangement charting

Production

- Gary Katz – producer on "Up Escalator"
- Chris Lord-Alge – remix of "Up Escalator"
- Love and Money – producers of "Soon", "Thistlekiss" and "History"

Other

- Stylorouge – design
- Trev Rogers – photography

== Charts ==
Chart (1989)	Peak position
UK Singles (OCC)	79
