= Still Time =

Still Time may refer to:

- Still Time (book), a 1994 photography book by Sally Mann
- Still Time (band), an American rock band from San Luis Obispo, California
- Still Time (album), a 2021 album by Karen Matheson
- Still Time (film), a 2022 fantasy comedy-drama film
