= River of People =

Single by Love and Money

from the album All You Need Is...
- B-side: "Desire"
- Released: 9 January 1987
- Length: 4:42 (album version); 4:25 (single version); 7:03 (extended version)
- Label: Mercury
- Songwriter(s): James Grant; Bobby Paterson
- Producer(s): Tom Dowd

Love and Money singles chronology
"Dear John" (1986)	"River of People" (1987)	"Love and Money" (1987)

"River of People" is a song by Scottish band Love and Money, which was released in 1987 as the third single from their debut studio album All You Need Is.... The song was written by James Grant and Bobby Paterson, and produced by Tom Dowd. "River of People" reached No. 82 in the UK Singles Chart and remained in the Top 100 for four weeks.

== Critical reception ==
On its release as a single, William Shaw of Smash Hits described "River of People" as "very enjoyable" and an "optimistic, soulful thing that swings along at a joyful pace". Kid Jensen, writing for Number One, noted the song's "loose arrangement which sounds effortlessly slick and is not too dissimilar to the Style Council's recent offering". He concluded, "It's the sort of white dance music I favour and which could even have some impact in the American market."

Lesley O'Toole of Record Mirror felt the song was "less overtly aggressive" than "Candybar Express" and "less Hall & Oates" than "Dear John". She wrote, "'River of People' sees Grant drawing in his quiff (metaphorically speaking), toning down the squealing guitars a mite and unravelling his most conventional rocker to date. Forceful, fixating and damned wearing on the toes." She concluded that the song "should give them the shortest odds on a hit yet". Jerry Smith of Music Week described "River of People" as a "bright and lively dance track". He added, "Its strong vocal and irresistible, bubbling beat within a crisp production should pick up plenty of exposure and follow 'Candybar Express' at least to the lower reaches of the charts." Music & Media picked the song as one of their "records of the week" during April 1987.

== Track listing ==
7-inch single

1. "River of People" – 4:25
2. "Desire" – 4:40

12-inch single

1. "River of People" (Extended Mix) – 7:03
2. "Candybar Express" (Shep Pettibone Mix) – 5:59
3. "Desire" – 4:40

Double 12-inch single

1. "River of People" (Extended Mix) – 7:03
2. "Candybar Express" (Shep Pettibone Mix) – 5:59
3. "Desire" – 4:40
4. "River of People" (Acapella Version) – 5:

12-inch single (UK promo)

1. "River of People" (Extended Mix) – 7:03
2. "Candybar Express" (Shep Pettibone Mix) – 5:59

== Personnel ==
Credits are adapted from the UK 12-inch single sleeve notes and the All You Need Is... booklet.

Love and Money

- James Grant – lead vocals, lead guitar
- Paul McGeechan – keyboards
- Bobbie Paterson – bass
- Stuart Kerr – drums, backing vocals
- Ronnie Goodman – percussion

Production

- Tom Dowd – producer on "River of People"
- Dave Buscombe – mixing engineer on "River of People"
- Mark Berry – mixing on "River of People"
- Love and Money – producers on "Desire"
- Shep Pettibone – mixer on "Candybar Express"

== Charts ==
Chart (1987)	Peak position
UK Singles (OCC)	82
