= Love and Money (song) =

Single by Love and Money

from the album All You Need Is...
- B-side: "Home Is Where the Heart Is"
- Released: 30 March 1987
- Length: 3:48
- Label: Mercury
- Songwriter(s): James Grant
- Producer(s): Love and Money

Love and Money singles chronology
| "River of People" (1987) | "Love and Money" (1987) | "Halleluiah Man" (1988) |

"Love and Money" is a song by Scottish band Love and Money, released on 30 March 1987 as the third and final single from their debut studio album, All You Need Is... (1986). The song was written by James Grant and was produced by Love and Money. "Love and Money" reached number 68 in the UK Singles Chart and remained in the top 100 for four weeks.

For its release as a single, "Love and Money" was given a new mix by Brian New.

== Critical reception ==
Upon its release as a single, Peter Kinghorn of the Evening Chronicle called "Love and Money" "gritty, fuzzy rock". Mark Barden of the Dorset Echo described it as a "polished slice of funk-rock which isn't a million miles away from the Power Station". Simon Warner of the Halifax Evening Courier noted that the "excellent Love and Money [are] still trying hard, but I don't think this tight slice of funk rock is the one".

Kevin Murphy of Sounds stated, "Pulsating club sound with all the predictable moves made in all the right places. In other words, I've heard it all before." Simon Mayo, writing for Number One, felt "Love and Money" was a "boring song", but noted the "good production". He added, "Love and Money are a perfect example of a band who really need a good song to launch them." Nancy Culp of Record Mirror was also critical and advised readers to "forget the records, go and see them [live]". She wrote, "This sounds like yet more ditch water running into the canal, but live they've got something the rest of the bunch haven't."

== Track listing ==
7-inch single (UK)

1. "Love and Money" – 3:48
2. "Home Is Where the Heart Is" – 4:06

Free cassette with limited edition 7-inch single, recorded on the Radio Clyde Mobile, Barrowlands, 14 March 1987 (UK)

1. "Jane"
2. "Twisted"
3. "You're Beautiful"
4. "Temptation Time"

12-inch single (UK)

1. "Love and Money" – 5:21
2. "Love and Money" (Exclusive Mix) – 5:28
3. "Home Is Where the Heart Is" – 4:06

12-inch single (UK #2)

1. "Love and Money" – 5:21
2. "Love Is a Million Miles Away" – 4:15
3. "She Carved Her Name" – 4:51

12-inch limited edition double-pack single (UK)

1. "Love and Money" – 5:21
2. "Love and Money" (Exclusive Mix) – 5:27
3. "Home Is Where the Heart Is" – 4:06
4. "Cheese Burger" (Live Version) – 4:21
5. "You're Beautiful" (Live Version) – 5:06

== Personnel ==
Love and Money

- James Grant – lead vocals, guitar
- Paul McGeechan – keyboards
- Stuart Kerr – drums

Additional musicians

- Bobby Paterson – bass
- Ronnie Goodman – percussion
- Pepsi, June, Jackie – backing vocals

Production

- Love and Money – production ("Love and Money", "Home Is Where the Heart Is"), mixing (exclusive mix of "Love and Money")
- Brian New – mixing ("Love and Money")

== Charts ==
| Chart (1987) | Peak position |
|---|---|
| UK Singles (OCC) | 68 |
