= Dear John (Love and Money song) =

Single by Love and Money

from the album All You Need Is...
- B-side: "Jane"
- Released: 1 August 1986
- Length: 4:29
- Label: Mercury
- Songwriter(s): James Grant
- Producer(s): Tom Dowd

Love and Money singles chronology
"Candybar Express" (1986)	"Dear John" (1986)	"River of People" (1987)

"Dear John" is a song by Scottish band Love and Money, released in 1986 as the second single from their debut studio album All You Need Is.... The song was written by James Grant and produced by Tom Dowd.

Despite the band's moderate success with their debut single "Candybar Express", which cracked the top 75 of the UK Singles Chart, "Dear John" failed to reach the top 100, stalling at number 103. It achieved a small amount of airplay on BBC Radio 1 as well as regional radio. For the 12-inch version of the single, an extended mix of the song was made by John Potoker.

== Critical reception ==
Upon its release as a single, Jerry Smith of Music Week considered "Dear John" to be as "equally memorable" as "Candybar Express". He added, "With its smooth vocal and swaying funk rhythm, it should go further than their debut managed." William Leith of NME was mixed in his review, commenting, "This refined mix of soft and hard noises, of daft lyrics and processed sax that comes out in slices, this soft, stacked Big Mac of a record is rather pleasant, if refusable, to listen to. There's a lot going on – little production dramas between rhythm and melody, for the most part – but it's not enough to be engaging."

Frank Hopkinson of Number One awarded the song two out of five stars and described it as "fragile, uncommercial, slightly cultish rock". He added, "If 'Candybar Express' couldn't crack it for talented Scots Love and Money, then trying to make the breakthrough with this is about as worthwhile as hitting yourself on the head with a scaffolding pole." Jim Reid of Record Mirror was also critical, describing it as being "hooked to such an old Hall & Oates bass line you can smell the carcass all the way from Glasgow". He noted that, alongside Brother Beyond's "I Should Have Lied" and Curiosity Killed the Cat's "Misfit", it was an example of a "gutless imitative record" and concluded, "When young bands try so hard to be neutered and colourless, you can only spit on their lack of ambition."

== Track listing ==
7-inch single (UK)

1. "Dear John" – 4:29
2. "Jane" – 4:01

12-inch single (UK)

1. "Dear John" (Extended Mix) – 5:09
2. "Jane" – 4:01
3. "Fame" (Live from the Palace) – 3:52
4. "The Shape of Things to Come" (Live from the Palace) – 4:56

== Personnel ==
Credits are adapted from the UK 7-inch and 12-inch single sleeve notes and the All You Need Is... vinyl LP sleeve notes.

Love and Money

- James Grant – lead vocals, lead guitar
- Paul McGeechan – keyboards
- Bobbie Paterson – bass
- Stuart Kerr – drums, backing vocals
- Ronnie Goodman – percussion

Production

- Tom Dowd – producer on "Dear John"
- David Bascombe – mixing engineer on "Dear John"
- John Potoker – mixing on extended mix of "Dear John"
- Love and Money – producers on "Jane", "Fame" and "The Shape of Things to Come"
- Buster – engineer on "Fame" and "The Shape of Things to Come"

Other

- Chris Garnham – front cover photography
- Tim Brettday – back cover photography
- The Leisure Process – design

== Charts ==
Chart (1986)	Peak position
UK Singles Chart	103
