= Down River =

Down River may refer to:

- Down River (1931 film), a British crime film
- Down River (2013 film), a Canadian drama film

== See also ==
- Downriver, a region located in Wayne County, Michigan
- Downriver (album), a 2005 album by Karen Matheson
- Downriver (film), a 2015 Australian film
- Downriver League, an athletic conference
- Downriver Stars, a minor professional ice hockey team
