= Dogs in the Traffic =

Studio album by Love and Money
- Released: 1991
- Length: 45:06
- Label: Fontana; Phonogram
- Producer: Steve Nye; Tony Phillips; Love and Money

Love and Money chronology
Strange Kind of Love (1988)	Dogs in the Traffic (1991)	Littledeath (1993)

Dogs in the Traffic is the third studio album by Scottish band Love and Money, released by Fontana in 1991. The album reached No. 41 on the UK Albums Chart.

Three singles were released from the album: "My Love Lives in a Dead House", "Looking for Angeline" and "Winter". "Looking for Angeline" also served as the lead track on the band's 1991 EP Wishing Waters. "Winter" peaked at No. 52 on the UK Singles Chart.

In 2022, Dogs in the Traffic received a 30th anniversary reissue on CD and vinyl by Past Night from Glasgow. Three different editions of the vinyl were released: black, transparent red and limited edition transparent green vinyl. The CD contains six bonus tracks.

== Background ==
Following the release of 1988's Strange Kind of Love, Love and Money returned to the studio to record their follow-up, The Mother's Boy. However, when the new material was delivered to the band's record label, it was not warmly received. The release was scrapped and the band returned to the studio to start afresh. One of the tracks, "Pappa Death", was included on Dogs in the Traffic. Grant told Vox in 1991: "I just wanted to change the way the band was perceived but I really went overboard. It was nervous breakdown material. At the time, I was really getting into a misanthropic swing; it was like Bukowski, Celine, Rimbaud."

Speaking of Dogs in the Traffic to Brian Hogg, Grant recalled in 1993: "Much of the record is like an open wound. People have said it's grim and depressing and I take that as a compliment. I'm glad that's come across. It's the first record I've made that I felt truly represented me and the way I feel."

Grant had to persuade Phonogram to allow some of the tracks for Dogs in the Traffic to be included on the release. He recalled to The Scotsman in 1993: "I'm not averse to being patted on the back but Phonogram never said: 'That's good.' They said: 'We're looking for something more commercial.' I had to get down on my knees and beg, basically, for some of the stuff to be included on Dogs in the Traffic."

== Critical reception ==
Professional ratings
Review scores
Source	Rating
NME	6/10
Q	3/5 stars
Vox	7/10 stars

On its release, Philip Thomas of Q wrote, "The production and musicianship live up to the quality of the songs, and James Grant is in possession of an almost faultless set of vocal cords. Further, Grant's pre-occupations (relationships, human frailty, loneliness) and his soulful warble are engaging." Craig McLean of Vox concluded, "Dogs in the Traffic is relaxingly refreshing, gently evincing that this soft-on-the-ears lovelorn lark doesn't have to be flaccid pap." Peter Kinghorn of the Evening Chronicle praised each track for being "a well crafted gem with no trace of a flaw or weakness" and added that "their emphasis on melody, combined with quality performance, is such a refreshing change". Tonia Macari of the Evening Express described it as "a welcome new chapter in Love and Money's distinct style and musical originality". He added, "Throughout the album they have managed to retain their distinctive heavenly melodies but show a more mature depth and diversity to both their sound and lyrics."

David Quantick of New Musical Express noted how, with Dogs in the Traffic, the band had "refined their sound" from "Glaswegian post-'Let's Dance' funk rock" to "a sort of skeletal post-Nick Cave jazz rock groove". He praised the album's "pleasantness", "tasteful production" and "lack of excess", but felt there are "no great songs to speak of" and "a muted sense of striving towards an unattained result". He added, "Everything is nearly fine, but at no time does a hook or a feel or even a bit of spirit kick in to any of these songs." Adam Sweeting of The Guardian stated, "Dogs in the Traffic finds Love and Money playing down their Scots-funk inclinations in favour of smoothly-turned adult rock-pop, frequently picking out their easeful melodies on acoustic guitars and tinting them with fastidiously-wrought vocal harmonies. Grant's songs are never quite bland, but never exciting. File under Easy Listening."

== Track listing ==
All tracks are written by James Grant except "Wanderlust II" by Grant and Bobby Paterson

No.	Title	Length
1.	"Winter"	4:09
2.	"Johnny's Not Here"	4:34
3.	"My Love Lives in a Dead House"	4:44
4.	"Cheap Pearls"	5:06
5.	"You're Not the Only One"	5:16
6.	"Looking for Angeline"	3:52
7.	"Sometimes I Want To Give Up"	4:10
8.	"Lips Like Ether"	5:09
9.	"Whiskey Dream"	3:29
10.	"Pappa Death"	4:40

2022 Past Night from Glasgow CD reissue bonus tracks
No.	Title	Length
11.	"Winter '89"	3:53
12.	"Blue Eyed World"	4:39
13.	"Who in Their Right Mind"	4:50
14.	"Hubcap to Blue Town"	2:27
15.	"Treasure and Treason"	3:53
16.	"Wanderlust II"	3:51

== Personnel ==
Love and Money

- James Grant – vocals, guitar
- Douglas MacIntyre – guitar, backing vocals
- Paul McGeechan – keyboards
- Bobby Paterson – bass, backing vocals
- Gordon Wilson – drums

Additional musicians

- Louise Rutkowski – backing vocals (tracks 2, 5–6)
- The Kick Horns – brass (track 3)
- Fraser Speirs – harmonica (tracks 4, 6)
- B. J. Cole – pedal steel (track 5)
- Ronnie Goodman – percussion (track 6)
- Beatrice Colin – backing vocals (track 6)
- Dave Pringle – string arrangement (track 9)

Production

- Steve Nye – producer (tracks 1, 3, 5, 7, 10), mixing (tracks 1, 3–10)
- Tony Phillips – producer (tracks 2, 4, 8)
- Love and Money – producers (tracks 6, 9)
- Barry Hammond – engineer (tracks 1, 3, 5, 7, 10)
- Brian Young – engineer (tracks 6, 9), mixing engineer (track 2)
- Bobby Paterson – mixing (track 2)
- Stuart Bruce – mixing engineer (tracks 1, 3–10)
- Robin Rankin – mixing engineer (track 2)

Other

- Stylorouge, Love and Money – design
- Nigel Schermuly – front cover photography
- Gavin Evans – photography

== Charts ==
Chart (1991)	Peak position
UK Albums Chart	41
