= Thrum (band) =

Scottish indie rock band

- Origin: Bellshill, Lanarkshire, Scotland, United Kingdom
- Genres: Indie Rock, Alt Country
- Years active: 1992–1995, 2011–present
- Labels: Fire, PRA Records, Mecca Holding Co
- Members: Monica Queen; Johnny Smillie; Gary Johnston
- Past members: Dave McGowan

Thrum are an indie rock band from Bellshill, Lanarkshire, Scotland, formed in 1992. They released four singles and an album before splitting up in 1995. Singer Monica Queen went on to a solo career. Since 2011, Thrum have reformed, releasing a single and album and undertaking a number of live appearances.

== History ==
The group were formed in 1992 by Johnny Smillie (guitar, vocals), Dave McGowan (bass guitar, vocals), Gary Johnston (drums), and Monica Queen (vocals, guitar). Smillie had met Queen while she was singing in a youth theatre performance of Godspell, and she had previously sung in a Christian rock band. Smillie was strongly influenced by Neil Young while Queen cited Patsy Cline, Johnny Cash and Tammy Wynette as influences.

They signed to Fire Records at the start of 1993, and Fire issued their début self-titled EP in April 1993. Singles "So Glad" (which they performed on The Word) and "Here I Am" were critically well-received, and they recorded their début album Rifferama in San Francisco. "Purify" was taken from the album as the band's final single. Thrum recorded a radio session for Mark Radcliffe in which they previewed tracks from a forthcoming second album provisionally entitled "Archangel". However, they split up and it remains unreleased. Queen went on to provide guest vocals on Belle & Sebastian's "Lazy Line Painter Jane" single in 1997, recorded duets with The Jayhawks, Grant Lee Buffalo and Shane MacGowan, and performed with Snow Patrol in Glasgow (June 2010). In addition to her guest vocal work, Queen signed to Creeping Bent and spent the 2000s as a solo artist (with Smillie still on guitar), releasing an EP in 2000 and albums in 2001 and 2004.

The group reformed after a 16-year hiatus in 2011 and released a new album, Elettrorama, making a live appearance at that year's T in the Park festival. Ian Greher replaced McGowan on bass guitar, following the latter's decision not to take part in the reunion. In May 2013, with Rory McGregor now on bass, Thrum released a two-track single All Over Again on new record label Mecca Holding Co and continue sporadic live appearances, concurrent to Queen's solo activities.

== Discography ==
=== Albums ===
- Rifferama (1994), Fire
- Elettrorama (2011), PRA

=== Singles, EPs ===
- Thrum EP (1993), Fire
- "So Glad" (1994), Fire
- "Here I Am" (1994), Fire
- "Purify" (1994), Fire
- "All Over Again" (2013), Mecca Holding Co
