= The Honeythief =

Single by Hipsway

from the album Hipsway
- B-side: "Wild Sorrow"
- Released: 1986
- Genre: New wave; sophisti-pop
- Length: 3:10
- Label: Mercury
- Songwriters: Grahame Skinner; Harry Travers; Johnny McElhone; Ally McLeod
- Producer: Gary Langan

Hipsway singles chronology
"Ask the Lord" (1985)	"The Honeythief" (1986)	"Long White Car" (1986)

"The Honeythief" is a 1986 song performed by the Scottish band Hipsway.

== Background ==
The song's title was inspired by a 16th-century painting, "Venus and Cupid, the Honey Thief", found in the Burrell Collection art museum in Glasgow.

The lyrics are based on Vladimir Nabokov's book Lolita. In 1987, singer Grahame Skinner said, "It's just written from the point of view of a lecherous man who has an attraction for an innocent young girl — 'She's the honey and I'm the thief'."

== Chart performance ==
It was included on their 1986 self-titled debut album and released as a single, which reached number 17 on the UK Singles Chart, and number 19 on the Billboard Hot 100. Its remix reached number 9 on the US Dance Club Play Singles chart.

"The Honeythief" was the band's only top 40 hit in the US. It has since appeared on over a dozen '80s music compilations.

Chart (1986–1987)	Peak position
Australian (Kent Music Report)	91
Canada Top Singles (RPM)	49
Ireland (IRMA)	20
Netherlands (Dutch Top 40)	33
New Zealand (Recorded Music NZ)	26
UK Singles (Official Charts)	17
US Billboard Hot 100	19
US Billboard Hot Dance Club Play	9
US Cash Box	28
