= The Dreaming Sea =

Studio album by Karen Matheson
- Released: 1996
- Genre: Folk rock
- Length: 53:58
- Label: Survival Records
- Producer: Donald Shaw

Karen Matheson chronology
| The Dreaming Sea (1996) | Time to Fall (2002) |

The Dreaming Sea is the debut solo studio album by Karen Matheson, lead singer of the Scottish band Capercaillie. The album was released in 1996 by Survival Records and reissued in North America by Valley Entertainment in 2000.

== Track listing ==
1. "There's Always Sunday" – 4:09
2. "Rithill Aill" – 3:42
3. "The Dreaming Sea" – 4:38
4. "Mi Le M' Uilinn" – 5:30
5. "Early Morning Grey" – 4:27
6. "'Ic Iain 'Ic Sheumais" – 5:05
7. "One More Chance" – 3:42
8. "Fac Thu Na Feidh" – 4:44
9. "An Fhideag Airgid" – 4:18
10. "At the End of the Night" – 4:20
11. "Move On" – 3:19
12. "Calbharaigh" – 3:41
13. "Evangeline" – 2:26
