= Candybar Express =

Single by Love and Money

from the album All You Need Is...
- B-side: "Love & Money (Dub)"
- Released: 1986
- Length: 3:30 (album/single version); 5:55 (extended mix)
- Label: Mercury
- Songwriter: James Grant
- Producer: Andy Taylor

Love and Money singles chronology
"Candybar Express" (1986)	"Dear John" (1986)

"Candybar Express" is a song by Scottish band Love and Money, which was released in 1986 as the debut single from their debut studio album All You Need Is.... The song was written by James Grant and produced by Andy Taylor. "Candybar Express" reached number 56 in the UK Singles Chart and number 10 on the Billboard Hot Dance/Disco Club Play chart.

== Background ==
Grant wrote "Candybar Express" while on tour with his former band Friends Again. He wanted to write something similar to Wham!'s 1982 hit "Young Guns (Go for It)", but "more cynical". The song was first recorded by Love and Money in 1985, which along with other demo tracks, resulted in them signing to Phonogram's Mercury Records. When Duran Duran's Andy Taylor happened to hear the song, he insisted on producing it and the song was then re-recorded with Taylor as the producer.

Soon after its release, Grant was critical of the song and openly stated that it, along with the other tracks on the band's debut album All You Need Is...', was below his ability as a songwriter. He told Scotland on Sunday in 1993, "'Candybar Express' was a joke that backfired. It wasn't meant to be taken so seriously, and I ended up, stupidly, being captain of that ship and steering it into the great beyond. And it didn't happen and it ended up looking silly, because the whole thing was one great advertising slogan." Grant also felt working with Taylor on the track was a mistake, later describing him as "an exponent of the corruption I was singing about". For his role as producer, Taylor told Smash Hits in 1986, "I don't care, as long as I got paid, haha! I did enjoy making it – it's a good record and they have talent".

In more recent years, Grant's view of "Candybar Express" has mellowed. He told Nicola Meighan in 2013, "I think it's one of the most sarcastic songs ever written, I'm proud to say. The unfortunate thing is that it wasn't a worldwide smash, which defeated the purpose to a point, and made it a bit of an albatross around my neck."

== Music video ==
The song's music video was commissioned for the North American market and was shot in the Mojave Desert. It largely features the band performing the song on a stage, behind which is a large billboard featuring the band's name. Other sequences show crew members setting up the stage and painting the billboard. The video achieved medium rotation on MTV.

== Critical reception ==
Upon its release, Anna Martin of Number One awarded the song four out of five stars and described it as "a versatile chunk of endearingly sharp funk" and "mean, meaty and menacing". Jerry Smith of Music Week praised it as a "catchy and very danceable debut single, all competently done and rather in the vein of a less subtle Hipsway". Mark Putterford of Kerrang! stated, "Dirty geetar, sweet sax, fittingly funky(ish) beat... and a surprisingly good song. One of the better 'Short Kutz' this week, to be sure." Richard Cook of Sounds called the song "one of those hoodoo sin metropolis odes" and a "good try, clattery and insecure enough to suggest that they don't expect the world to dump everything in their hands". He continued, "Andy Taylor's production veers towards intercontinental funk – can't decide whether the HM guitar suits or not – but it sounds like they're leering because they want to, not because some fool's paid them to do it".

The Middleton Guardian believed it was "a strong song in the style of B.A.D.", which "spreads a bit thin over 12 inches but is still cocky, catchy and rhythmic". David Swift of New Musical Express felt the band were "shoving a typically useless metaphor over another lame, heavy dancefloor mix". He added, "A fearfully-raked guitar, piled on extra thick, stabs around a P-L-O-D of a beat." Stuart Bailie of Record Mirror was also critical of the song, noting that it "works a basic funk riff to death" and "rel[ies] wholly on New York studio men to sustain the record's interest". He added, "It has a pumping kick drum and a fair smattering of sex; it sounds like the kissing cousin of 'The Honeythief', and that's bad."

== Track listing ==
7-inch single

1. "Candybar Express" – 3:30
2. "Love & Money" (Dub) – 4:40

7-inch promotional single (US)

1. "Candybar Express" – 3:30
2. "Candybar Express" – 3:30

12-inch single (UK, France, Germany and Canada)

1. "Candybar Express" (Extended Mix) – 5:55
2. "Candybar Express" (LP Version) – 3:30
3. "Love & Money" (Dub) – 4:40

12-inch single (US)

1. "Candybar Express" (New York Remix) – 6:05
2. "Candybar Express" (New York Dub) – 5:05
3. "Candybar Express" (Extended Mix) – 5:55

12-inch single (Australasia)

1. "Candybar Express" (Pettibone Mix) – 6:06
2. "Candybar Express" (LP Version) – 3:30
3. "Love & Money" (Dub) – 4:40

== Personnel ==
Credits are adapted from the UK 12-inch single sleeve notes and the All You Need Is... booklet.

Love and Money

- James Grant – lead vocals, guitar
- Paul McGeechan – keyboards
- Stuart Kerr – drums

Additional musicians

- Bobby Paterson – bass
- Ronnie Goodman – percussion
- Pepsi, June, Jackie – backing vocals

Production

- Andy Taylor – producer
- Shep Pettibone – remix ("Pettibone Mix", "New York Remix" and "New York Dub")
- Michael Hutchinson – remix engineer ("New York Remix" and "New York Dub")

Other

- Health and Efficiency – sleeve design
- Chris Garnham – photography

== Charts ==
Chart (1986)	Peak position
Australia Kent Music Report	96
UK Singles (OCC)	56
US Hot Dance/Disco Club Play (Billboard)	10
