= Halleluiah Man =

Single by Love and Money

from the album Strange Kind of Love
- Released: 5 September 1988 (UK); February 1989 (US)
- Length: 4:37 (album version); 3:59 (single version)
- Label: Fontana; Mercury
- Songwriter(s): James Grant
- Producer(s): Gary Katz

Love and Money singles chronology
"Love and Money" (1987)	"Halleluiah Man" (1988)	"Strange Kind of Love" (1989)

"Halleluiah Man" is a song by Scottish band Love and Money, which was released in 1988 as the lead single from their second studio album Strange Kind of Love. The song was written by James Grant and produced by Gary Katz. "Halleluiah Man" reached No. 63 in the UK Singles Chart and No. 75 on the US Billboard Hot 100.

== Release ==
Phonogram promoted the single's UK release with full-page adverts in music magazines, national fly-posting and in-store displays. The single was released to coincide with the band's British tour dates and an appearance on the Channel 4 programme Wired.

== Music video ==
The song's music video was directed by Pete Cornish and produced by Pete Chambers for Fugitive TV. It achieved breakout rotation on MTV and medium rotation on VH1.

== Critical reception ==
On its release as a single, Jerry Smith of Music Week wrote, "This single is sharp and stylish enough to realise this Scottish band's obvious potential." Tim Nicholson of Record Mirror was unfavourable in his review, describing the song as "the worst kind of cod soul complete with a flawless production and about as much emotion as you'll find in a Gold Blend advert". He drew comparisons to Curiosity Killed the Cat and concluded that Love and Money "never sounded so dull". James Hamilton, writing for the Record Mirror DJ directory, considered it to be "rather pleasant if lyrically obscure atmospheric lazily swaying 0-91 1/6 jiggly jogger". He added, "I can't help thinking Hall & Oates would have concocted a sharper song with the same feel".

Marcus Alton of the Newark Advertiser wrote, "A meaty bass fails to make this the succulent morsel it could be. It's about a born again guy but it will need a lot of praying to get in the charts." In a review of Strange Kind of Love, Dennis Dillon, writing for The Advocate-Messenger, commented, "The song opens with Grant singing of his working class background and his feelings toward the spiritual and monetary corruption of certain television evangelists in America. Sure it's sung with sarcasm, but I can't help but detect a note of sadness in Grant's voice for all the people with checkbook in hand trying to find salvation."

== Track listing ==
7-inch single

1. "Halleluiah Man" – 3:59
2. "Love Is a Million Miles Away" – 4:15

12-inch single

1. "Halleluiah Man" – 4:37
2. "Love Is a Million Miles Away" – 4:15
3. "She Carved Her Name" – 4:51

12-inch single (UK limited edition)

1. "Halleluiah Man" – 4:37
2. "Love Is a Million Miles Away" – 4:15
3. "She Carved Her Name" – 4:51
4. "Wanderlust 2" – 3:53

CD single

1. "Halleluiah Man" – 4:37
2. "Love Is a Million Miles Away" – 4:15
3. "She Carved Her Name" – 4:51
4. "Wanderlust 2" – 3:53

CD single (US promo)

1. "Halleluiah Man" (7" Version) – 3:59
2. "Halleluiah Man" (LP Version) – 4:37

== Personnel ==
Credits are adapted from the UK CD single liner notes and the Strange Kind of Love booklet.

Love and Money

- James Grant – lead vocals, backing vocals, electric guitar
- Paul McGeechan – keyboards
- Bobby Paterson – bass
- Ronnie Goodman – percussion

Additional musicians

- Jeff Porcaro – drums
- Paul "Smilemaker" Griffin – clavinet on "Halleluiah Man"
- Frank "Goldshoe" Floyd, Lani Groves, Dennis Collins – backing vocals on "Halleluiah Man"

Production

- Gary Katz – producer on "Halleluiah Man"
- Wayne Yurgelun – engineer on "Halleluiah Man"
- Eric Eckley – assistant engineer on "Halleluiah Man"
- Bill Price – mixing on "Halleluiah Man"
- Love and Money – producers on "Love Is a Million Miles Away", "She Carved Her Name" and "Wanderlust 2"
- Brian Young – engineer on "Love Is a Million Miles Away"
- Kenny McDonald – engineer on "She Carved Her Name" and "Wanderlust 2"

Other

- Stylorouge – design, art direction
- Avid Images – photography

== Charts ==
=== Weekly charts ===
Chart (1988–89)	Peak position
Australia (ARIA)	47
Austria (Ö3 Austria Top 40)	27
France (SNEP)	41
Italy Airplay (Music & Media)	1
New Zealand (Recorded Music NZ)	47
UK Singles (OCC)	63
US Billboard Hot 100	75
US Billboard Adult Contemporary	44
US Cash Box Top 100 Singles	74
