= All You Need Is... =

Studio album by Love and Money
- Released: 4 July 1986 (UK)
- Length: 38:51
- Label: Mercury
- Producer: Tom Dowd; Andy Taylor

Love and Money chronology
All You Need Is... (1986)	Strange Kind of Love (1988)

All You Need Is... is the debut studio album by Scottish band Love and Money, released by Mercury in 1986.

== Background ==
Love and Money formed in 1985 and quickly signed to Phonogram's Mercury Records. In 1986, the band released their debut single "Candybar Express" which was then followed with the album All You Need Is... Although "Candybar Express" gained some attention and reached No. 56 on the UK Singles Chart in May 1986, the album was not a commercial success. A further three singles were released from the album: "Dear John", "River of People" (reached No. 82 in February 1987) and "Love and Money" (reached No. 68 in April 1987). Speaking of the album to Brian Hogg, Grant recalled in 1993: "I can't listen to our first record. I just don't think its very good."

== Critical reception ==
Professional ratings
Review scores
Source	Rating
The Everett Herald	3/5 stars
The Orlando Sentinel	4/5 stars
The Ottawa Citizen	2/4 stars
Record Mirror	2.5/5 stars
Sounds	3.5/5 stars

Upon its release, Roger Holland of Sounds stated that, although it had its moments, All You Need Is was "such a calculated attempt to produce a perfect dance/rock/pop album that it could not help but fail". He summarised, "The blueprint was there. This much is self-evident. But as so often happens when young men with cheekbones and Ray-Bans decide to make the pop album of the year, their intentions never quite translate onto vinyl." In the US, Billboard praised the group for its "strong songwriting ability and the chops to get it across". They added that Grant, as the group's "focal point", "is capable of impressing even the most casual listener". Bill Henderson of the Orlando Sentinel wrote: "The combinations of hard, punchy rhythms, psychedelic blues guitar and a '60s soul sound recall the best of that era without regurgitating it. The obvious fun that Love and Money had in the recording of this album is contagious."

Jim Kelton of The Everett Herald praised the album as "an honest and straightforward pop record", which contains "satire without sarcasm" and "crackles with anger and excitement", but "is never hysterical, self-indulgent [or] self-righteous". He concluded the album was "catchy, likeable, entertaining and highly promising". Mike Abrams of the Ottawa Citizen praised the "promising start" of "Candybar Express" but felt the following three songs were "weak soul-pop offerings". He also praised the "hot-rocking" "Cheeseburger" as showing the "band at its best". He concluded: "All Love and Money needed was a little more consistency and this would have been a good debut album."

== Track listing ==
All tracks are written by James Grant except "Cheeseburger" by Bobby Paterson and Grant, and "You're Beautiful" by Paul McGeechan and Grant.

No.	Title	Length
1.	"Candybar Express"	3:29
2.	"River of People"	4:42
3.	"Twisted"	3:57
4.	"Pain Is a Gun"	3:48
5.	"Love & Money"	4:08
6.	"Dear John"	4:29
7.	"Cheeseburger"	5:22
8.	"You're Beautiful"	4:47
9.	"Temptation Time"	4:15

== Personnel ==
Love and Money

- James Grant – lead vocals, lead guitar
- Paul McGeechan – keyboards
- Bobby Paterson - bass
- Stuart Kerr - drums, backing vocals
- Ronnie Goodman - percussion

Production

- Tom Dowd - producer (tracks 2, 3, 4, 6, 8, 9)
- Dave Bascombe - mixing engineer (tracks 2, 3, 4, 6, 7, 8, 9)
- Andy Taylor - producer (track 1)

Other

- The Leisure Process - design
- Steve Golin – photography
