= Strange Kind of Love =

Studio album by Love and Money
- Released: October 1988
- Length: 51:23 (original CD); 47:33 (vinyl)
- Label: Fontana; Mercury
- Producer: Gary Katz

Love and Money chronology
All You Need Is... (1986)	Strange Kind of Love (1988)	Dogs in the Traffic (1991)

Strange Kind of Love is the second studio album by Scottish band Love and Money, released in October 1988.

The album's lead single "Halleluiah Man" reached number 63 in the UK Singles Chart and number 75 on the US Billboard Hot 100. The following singles, "Strange Kind of Love", "Jocelyn Square" and "Up Escalator" were all released in 1989 and reached number 45, number 51 and number 79 respectively in the UK Singles Chart.

Strange Kind of Love was reissued by Cherry Red Records in 2010. The reissue includes six demo recordings from 1987 plus new sleeve notes written by producer Gary Katz, with recollections from band members James Grant and Paul McGeechan.

== Background ==
For the recording of Strange Kind of Love, Love and Money relocated from Scotland to New York City for half a year to work with American producer Gary Katz. With the departure of the band's drummer Stuart Kerr, session drummer and founding member of Toto, Jeff Porcaro, played on the album, reducing Love and Money to a trio of vocalist and guitarist James Grant, keyboardist Paul McGeechan and bassist Bobby Paterson.

In 1993, Grant revealed his mixed feelings for the album, "It's a good set of songs, but we didn't go the whole way. It still clung on to a rock/funk sort of thing [as heard on the band's 1986 debut album All You Need Is...]. The sessions dragged on and on, and the songs were already a year and a half to two years old by the time we got to work with Katz. He was a really lovely guy but he made me feel I couldn't sing. Some of the tracks we did 30 times and at the end of the day we were dropping in on syllables. Parts of it were really enjoyable, but in retrospect I've had this paranoia about my voice ever since."

== Critical reception ==
Professional ratings
Review scores
Source	Rating
AllMusic	4.5/5 stars

In the United States, Billboard described the album as "Simply Red meets Steely Dan or a funkier Danny Wilson", with the "unmistakable production" of Katz. They concluded that the "dark-themed tunes play better as a suite than individual tracks", but singled out the title track and "Jocelyn Square" as two potential singles. In a retrospective review, Michael Sutton of AllMusic noted the mixture of funk, blues, jazz, and country, and added that the album is "distinctly American in style". He considered the songs to be "moody but never boring", with Grant's lyrics "often more miserable than the music suggests". He added that the album "takes its time to unfold" with "repeated spins needed for Love & Money's bar band grooves to be keenly felt".

== Track listing ==
All tracks are written by James Grant except "Jocelyn Square" by Grant and Bobby Paterson, and "Avalanche" by Grant and Paul McGeechan.

No.	Title	Length
1.	"Halleluiah Man"	4:40
2.	"Shape of Things to Come"	5:14
3.	"Strange Kind of Love"	5:15
4.	"Axis of Love"	5:06
5.	"Jocelyn Square"	4:02
6.	"Walk the Last Mile"	5:07
7.	"Razorsedge"	4:21
8.	"Inflammable"	4:21
9.	"Up Escalator"	4:13
10.	"Avalanche"	5:08

Bonus track on CD and some cassette/vinyl editions
No.	Title	Writer(s)	Length
11.	"Scapegoat"	Grant, Paterson	3:50

2010 Cherry Red bonus tracks
No.	Title	Length
12.	"The Hallelujah Man" (Demo)	4:12
13.	"Walk the Last Mile with You" (Demo)	4:47
14.	"Scapegoats" (Demo)	4:40
15.	"Up Escalator" (Demo)	4:15
16.	"Strange Kind of Love" (Demo)	5:15
17.	"Axis of Love" (Demo)	4:31

== Personnel ==
Credits are adapted from the Strange Kind of Love booklet.

Love and Money

- James Grant – lead vocals (1–11), backing vocals (1, 3–4, 6, 9–10), electric guitar (1–11), acoustic guitar (4, 6, 8, 10), wah guitar (5), dobro (5), horn arrangement (8–9)
- Paul McGeechan – keyboards (1–8, 10–11), piano (2–5, 7, 10), organ (9)
- Bobby Paterson – bass (1–11), backing vocals (3, 9–10), horn arrangement (9)

Additional musicians

- Jeff Porcaro – drums
- Ronnie Goodman – percussion (1, 3–4, 7–11)
- Donald Fagen – clavinet (1)
- Paul Griffin – clavinet (1, 9), Rhodes piano (10), keyboard bass (11)
- Frank Floyd – backing vocals (1, 3–4, 7)
- Lani Groves, Dennis Collins – backing vocals (1)
- Beatrice Colin – backing vocals (3, 6, 8, 10)
- Leroy Clouden – additional drums (3, 5)
- Tim Schmidt – backing vocals (5)
- Zak Sanders – backing vocals (7)
- Dave Tofani – horns (8, 9)
- Lou Marini – solo (8)
- Colin Tully – horn arrangement (8)
- Don Brooks – harmonica (9)
- Ronnie Cuber, Dave Bargeron, Lou Sollof – horns (9)
- Merle Miller, Kati McGunigle – backing vocals (9)
- Rick Derringer – slide guitar (9)
- Dave Chesky – horn arrangement charting (9)
- Eric Weissberg – pedal steel guitar (10)

Production

- Gary Katz – producer
- Wayne Yurgelun – engineer
- Bill Price – mixing
- Bob Ludwig – mastering
- Eric Eckley – assistant engineer
- Fred Tenny, Stan Katayama, Mike Harlow, K. K. Nodots, Ron Skies – additional assistants

Other

- Stylorouge – design, art direction
- Avid Images – photography

== Charts ==
Chart (1988–89)	Peak position
Australian Albums (ARIA)	71
UK Albums (OCC)	71
US Billboard Hot 100	175
