= Downriver (album) =

Studio album by Karen Matheson
- Released: 24 October 2005 (worldwide) 2 November 2005 (France)
- Genre: Folk rock

Karen Matheson chronology
Time to Fall (2002)	Downriver (2005)	Urram (2015)

Downriver is the third solo (studio) album by Karen Matheson, lead singer of the Scottish band Capercaillie.

== Track listing ==
1. "Chi Mi Bhuam" (I See Afar) – 4:27
2. "Cronan Bleoghainn" – 5:01
  - "Cronan Bleoghainn"
  - "'S moch an diugh gun d'rinn mi eirigh"
3. "Gleann Baille Chaoil" – 4:26
4. "I Will Not Wear the Willow" – 5:35
5. "O Mhairi's Tu Mo Mhairi" - 5:08
  - "O Mhairi's Tu Mo Mhairi (Mary, You Are My Mary)"
  - "Riobainean Riomhach (Gorgeous Ribbons)"
6. "Laoidh Fhearchair Eòghainn" – 3:36
7. "O Nach Éisdeadh" – 4:05
  - O Nach Éisdeadh Tu'n Sgeul le Aire (Oh that You Would Listen to the Tale Attentively)
8. "Singing in the Dark" – 3:25
9. "Puirt A Beul" (Mouthmusic) – 3:45
10. "Luadh An Toraidh" (Harvest Waulking) – 3:18
11. "Crucán Na bPáiste" (Burial Place of the Children) - 5:12
