= Vertical Records =

- Founded: 2000
- Founder: Donald Shaw
- Distributor(s): Cádiz
- Genre: Scottish Roots, Folk, Singer/Songwriter, Rock and Pop
- Country of origin: United Kingdom
- Location: Glasgow
- Official website: verticalrecords.co.uk

Vertical Records is an independent record label founded by Capercaillie member Donald Shaw in 2000, based in Glasgow, Scotland.

== Releases ==
The label has predominantly focused on Celtic and roots music, with releases from Michael McGoldrick (Fused, Wired, Aurora), Shooglenifty (Solar Shears), Harem Scarem (Fishcake, Storm in a Teacup), Karan Casey (Distant Shore, Chasing The Sun), Karen Matheson (Downriver), Capercaillie (Roses and Tears), Aidan O'Rourke (Sirius), but has also released albums by Love and Money frontman James Grant (My Thrawn Glory, Holy Love, Strange Flowers) and Scottish singer-songwriter Roddy Hart (Bookmarks, Sign Language, Road of Bones, The Dylan EP).

== Artists ==
- Aidan O'Rourke
- Altan
- Andrew White
- Breabach
- Buille
- Capercaillie
- Dean Owens
- Dolphin Boy
- Dreamers' Circus
- Marcelo Cuba & Lecter
- Donald Shaw & Charlie McKerron
- Future Trad Collective
- Harem Scarem
- James Grant
- John McSherry & Dónal O'Connor
- Karan Casey
- Karen Matheson
- Michael McGoldrick
- Michael McGoldrick & John McSherry
- Monica Queen
- Mystery Juice
- Nusa
- Patsy Reid
- Roddy Hart
- Róisín Elsafty
- Ross Ainslie & Jarlath Henderson
- Shooglenifty
- Sunhoney
- Usher's Island

== See also ==
- List of record labels
