= Friends Again (band) =

Scottish new wave band

- Origin: Glasgow, Scotland
- Genres: New wave
- Years active: 1981–1984
- Labels: Mercury
- Past members: Chris Thomson; James Grant; Neil Cunningham; Paul McGeechan; Stuart Kerr

Friends Again were a Scottish new wave band, formed in 1981 in Glasgow, Scotland.

They were formed by members Chris Thomson (guitar, vocals) and Paul McGeechan (keyboards), together with Neil Cunningham (bass), Andrew McGurk (guitar) and Colin McGowan (drums). McGurk and McGowan left the band in 1982. Shortly after, James Grant (guitar, vocals) and Stuart Kerr (drums) joined the band to complete the line-up. The group were known for their singles "State of Art", "Sunkissed" and "Honey at the Core". They released a self-titled EP in 1984, which peaked at No. 59 on the UK Singles Chart. They then recorded their debut album, Trapped & Unwrapped (1984).

After the demise of the band, Grant went on to form Love and Money in 1985 along with McGeechan and Kerr, while Thomson formed the Bathers.

== Discography ==
=== Albums ===
- Trapped and Unwrapped (1984)

=== Singles ===
- "Honey at the Core" (1983)
- "State of Art" (1983) - UK No. 93
- "Sunkissed" (1983)
- The Friends Again EP (1984) - UK No. 59
- "South of Love" (1984)
