= Monica Queen =

Scottish singer

Monica Queen is a singer from Glasgow, Scotland who has collaborated with Belle & Sebastian (e.g., on Lazy Line Painter Jane from the Lazy Line Painter Jane EP), Chris Coco, James Grant and Jim White, among others. She is listed on the Fire Records (UK) artists page as a contributing artist to their Chamber Music album, a 36-part tribute to James Joyce's Chamber Music.

She works with Johnny Smillie, with whom she co-founded Thrum, who were part of the indie scene in Glasgow in the 1990s. Thrum signed to Fire Records (UK) (home of Teenage Fanclub, Pulp and the Pastels), and released several records between 1990 and 1997. After Thrum broke up she left the music business, but returned after Stuart Murdoch from Belle & Sebastian asked her to sing with them. She returned under her name, working with Thrum's Johnny Smillie and released Ten Sorrowful Mysteries and Return of the Sacred Heart as Monica Queen.

She sang "Set the Fire to the Third Bar" with Snow Patrol at Bellahouston Park in Glasgow on 12 June 2010.

== Discography ==
- Ten Sorrowful Mysteries - Creeping Bent
- Return of the Sacred Heart (2005) - Vertical
