= Hipsway =

Scottish pop/new wave band

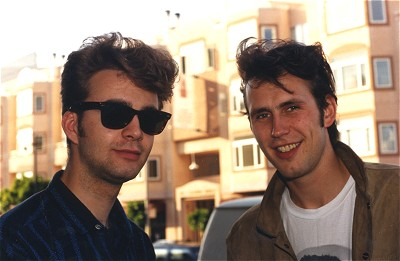
- Pim Jones and Grahame Skinner of Hipsway; San Francisco, California, US

Background information
- Origin: Glasgow, Scotland
- Genres: Pop; new wave
- Years active: 1984–1989, 2016–present
- Label: Mercury
- Past members: Johnny McElhone; Grahame Skinner; Pim Jones; Harry Travers; Stephen Ferrera; Gary Houston

Hipsway are a Scottish pop/new wave band.

== History and description ==
The band was formed in Glasgow in 1984 by ex-Altered Images member Johnny McElhone on bass, and featuring Grahame Skinner (vocals), Pim Jones (guitar) and Harry Travers (drums). Skinner and Travers had been members of the band Kites with Paul McGrath and Ian McGreevy before Hipsway formed. Their music was characterized by Skinner's deep vocals and Jones' rhythmic guitar style. They were quickly signed up by Mercury Records and by 1985 had released their first, eponymously titled album. The album was a moderate success on the UK Albums Chart; while the single "The Honeythief", made number 17 on the UK Singles Chart, and also reached the top 20 on the U.S. Billboard Hot 100 chart. Another song from the album, "Tinder", became well known in Scotland as the soundtrack to a McEwan's Lager commercial.

However the band failed to build on its success; McElhone founded Texas, and by the time the second album Scratch the Surface was recorded, Travers had also left (to be replaced by Stephen Ferrera). Released in 1989, the album was not as critically or commercially successful as its predecessor, and the band split up shortly afterwards.

Skinner and Jones subsequently went on to found the band Witness, releasing the album House Called Love (A&M), before Skinner joined former members of Glasgow peers Love and Money in the band, Cowboy Mouth. Pim Jones later formed Big Yoga Muffin with Ange Dolittle, formerly of Eat, releasing one album, Wherever You Go, There You Are (2000, The Echo Label).

In 2011, Grahame Skinner formed the band Skinner with Douglas MacIntyre (Love & Money, Cowboy Mouth and Sugartown), Gordon Wilson (Love & Money and Cowboy Mouth) and Andy Alston (Del Amitri).

In November 2016, Hipsway reformed, playing at Summerhall, Edinburgh then two dates at Glasgow O2 ABC, in support of the 30th anniversary deluxe reissue of their first album. As a result of the positive reception to the re-issue and the 2016 shows, the band played a limited number of gigs in 2017 and 2018, including sell-out shows at the reopened Glasgow Kelvingrove Bandstand and the Barrowland Ballroom.

Hipsway's first album for almost 30 years, Smoke & Dreams, was released in late 2018.

Post-reformation touring/recording band members have included Jim McDermott (drums), Gary Houston (bass), Stevie Christie (keyboards), Andy May (keyboards), Andy Gillespie (keyboards), David Robertson (percussion) and Louise Murphy (vocals).

== Discography ==
=== Albums ===
Title	Album details	Peak chart positions			
Title	Album details	UK	GER	NZ	US
Hipsway	Released: 11 April 1986; Label: Mercury; Formats: CD, LP, MC	42	62	45	55
Scratch the Surface	Released: August 1989; Label: Mercury; Formats: CD, LP, MC; Reissued in 1997 as The Rest of Hipsway	—	—	—	—
Smoke & Dreams	Released: 3 December 2018; Label: Oriel; Formats: CD, LP, digital download	—	—	—	—
"—" denotes releases that did not chart or were not released in that territory.

=== Singles ===
Title	Year	Peak chart positions							Album
Title	Year	UK	AUS	CAN	IRE	NZ	US	US Dance	Album
"The Broken Years"	1985	72	—	—	—	—	—	—	Hipsway
"Ask the Lord"	1985	72	—	—	—	—	—	—	Hipsway
"The Honeythief"	1986	17	91	49	20	26	19	9	Hipsway
"Ask the Lord" (new version)	1986	50	—	—	—	—	—	44	Hipsway
"Long White Car"	1986	55	—	—	—	—	—	—	Hipsway
"Your Love"	1989	66	103	—	—	—	—	—	Scratch the Surface
"Saturday Night (Down in the Garden)" (promo-only release)	2019	—	—	—	—	—	—	—	Smoke & Dreams
"—" denotes releases that did not chart or were not released in that territory.
