= Fife Free Press =

Local newspaper published in Fife, Scotland

- Type: Weekly newspaper
- Format: Tabloid
- Owner(s): National World
- Editor: Allan Crow
- Headquarters: Carlyle House; Carlyle Road; Kirkcaldy; Fife
- Circulation: 2,908 (as of 2023)
- Website: fifetoday.co.uk

The Fife Free Press is a local weekly newspaper published by National World. It is based in Kirkcaldy and is sold in central and southern Fife.

== History ==
The newspaper was first published in 1871. It was called the Fife Free Press, & Kirkcaldy Guardian until 1892 when the name was changed to the Fife Free Press. In November 2010, the format of the paper was changed from broadsheet, which had been the format since its first publication, to tabloid. In 2013 it had an average circulation of 11,510.

== See also ==
- List of newspapers in Scotland
