= Grahame Skinner =

- Born: 26 April 1962 (age 64); Glasgow
- Origin: Glasgow, Scotland
- Years active: 1980–present
- Labels: Rough Trade; Marina; A&M; Cheese; Mercury
- Website: grahameskinner.com

Grahame Skinner ("Skin") is a Scottish musician who currently fronts the band, The Skinner Group. He has been the lead singer for a number of bands.

He has been a member of:

- The Jazzateers (1983)
- The White Savages / Kites (1983)
- Hipsway (1984–1989, 2016 reunion)
- Witness (1991)
- The Pleasurelords / Sponge (1991)
- Cowboy Mouth (1994–1996)
- Bruise (2004)
- The Skinner Group (formerly Skinner, 2011–present)

He currently fronts The Skinner Group, a collective of Glasgow musicians. The other members are:

- Douglas MacIntyre (guitar)
- Gordon Wilson (drums)
- Campbell Owens (bass)
- Andy Alston (keyboards)
