= Karen Matheson =

Scottish folk singer

Karen Matheson OBE
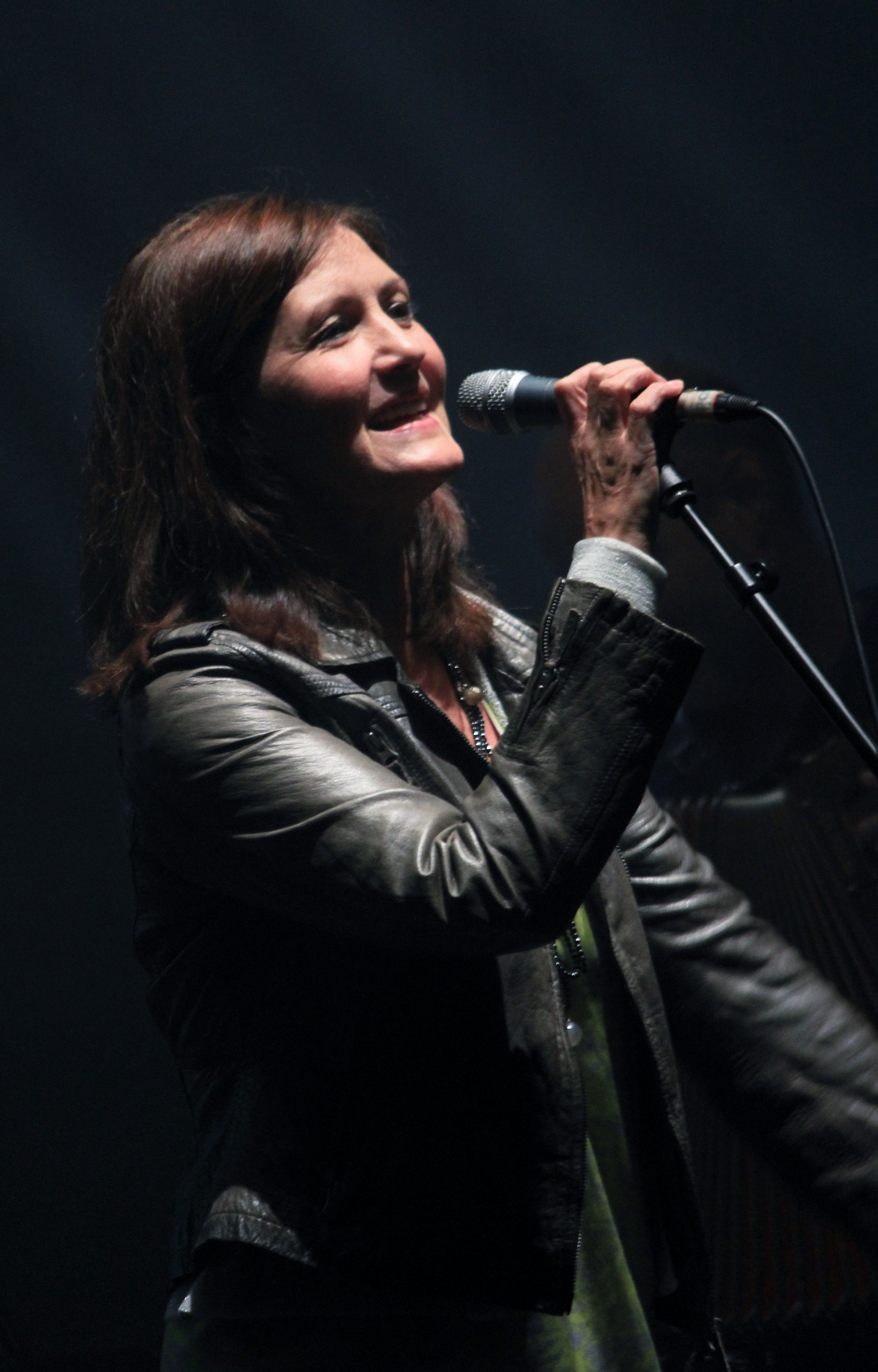
- Matheson performing with Capercaillie in 2013

Background information
- Born: 11 February 1963 (age 62)
- Origin: Taynuilt, Argyll, Scotland
- Genres: Folk
- Occupation: Singer
- Instrument: Vocals
- Years active: 1980s–present
- Member of: Capercaillie
- Formerly of: L'Héritage des Celtes
- Website: karenmatheson.com

Karen Matheson OBE (born 11 February 1963) is a Scottish folk singer who frequently sings in Gaelic. She is the lead singer of the group Capercaillie and was a member of Dan Ar Braz's group L'Héritage des Celtes, with whom she often sang lead vocals, either alone or with Elaine Morgan. She and Morgan sang together on the Breton language song "Diwanit Bugale", the French entry in the Eurovision Song Contest 1996. She made a cameo appearance in the 1995 movie Rob Roy singing the song "Ailein duinn".

== Biography ==
Matheson grew up in the small village of Taynuilt in the region of Argyll, western Scotland. She was appointed an OBE in the 2006 New Year's honours list. Matheson appeared as a guest musician on Spirit of the West's 1997 album Weights and Measures and performed on Secret Garden's song "Prayer" on their 1999 album Dawn of a New Century. She is married to fellow Capercaillie member Donald Shaw; they have a son.

In February 2010, Matheson made an appearance on Celtic Woman 4 and later in the year released her fourth solo album, Urram on Vertical Records. In support of the new album, she played a series of shows in Scotland and Ireland, and in early 2016 played shows across the UK as part of the Transatlantic Sessions before embarking on an 11-date UK tour.

In February 2021, Matheson released her fifth solo album. In September 2022, she sang a Gaelic psalm as part of a Service of Thanksgiving for the late Queen Elizabeth II, at St Giles' Cathedral in the Old Town, Edinburgh, which was attended by Charles III and other members of the British royal family.

== Solo discography ==
- The Dreaming Sea (1996)
- Time to Fall (2002)
- Downriver (2005)
- Urram (2015)
- Still Time (2021)
