= Fraser Speirs =

British musician

Fraser Speirs is a Glasgow-based harmonica player. Originally trained as a medical illustrator, Speirs has been performing for over 30 years and is now an internationally known performer and teacher.

He continues to perform with such musicians as Tam White, James Grant and Carol Kidd.
