= James Grant (musician) =

Scottish singer-songwriter

- Born: 22 November 1963 (age 62)
- Origin: Castlemilk, Glasgow, Scotland
- Occupations: Musician, vocalist, songwriter
- Instrument: Guitar
- Years active: 1982–present
- Member of: Love and Money
- Formerly of: Friends Again

James Grant (born 22 November 1963) is a Scottish musician, singer, and songwriter. He grew up in Glasgow's Castlemilk district and still resides in the city.

== Friends Again ==
James Grant's music career began in 1982 as songwriter and guitarist in the new wave band Friends Again, alongside Chris Thomson, later of the Bathers. The group had minor hit singles with "State of Art", "Sunkissed" and "Honey at the Core". They released a self-titled EP in 1983 which reached No. 59 in the UK and then recorded their debut album, Trapped & Unwrapped, in 1984. On 5 June 2015, as part of the BBC Music Day at the broadcaster's Pacific Quay HQ in Glasgow, Grant and Thomson reunited to play two Friends Again songs - "State of Art" and "Honey at the Core" - for a live studio audience. Their performance was broadcast live on the Music Through Midnight show presented by Billy Sloan, though it was also filmed, perhaps for online content or a future broadcast.

== Love and Money ==
When Friends Again split in 1985, Grant went on to form Love and Money along with drummer Stuart Kerr and keyboardist Paul McGeechan. In their nine years together, they recorded four moderately successful albums, All You Need Is..., Strange Kind of Love, Dogs in the Traffic and Littledeath, and had six chart hits in the United Kingdom.

In a newspaper interview in 2019, Grahame Skinner, the lead singer of Scottish pop / new wave band Hipsway, claimed that Grant should have had a credit on their debut single "The Broken Years", as he played lead guitar on the demo which won the band their first record deal with Mercury Records.

== Solo career ==
Grant's first solo album, Sawdust in My Veins, was released on Survival Records in 1998. It featured long term collaborator Donald Shaw, Karen Matheson, harmonica player Fraser Speirs, drummer James Mackintosh and the BT Scottish Ensemble. After a label change to Vertical, the same lineup was retained for My Thrawn Glory in 2000. I Shot the Albatross, a collection of poetry set to music, was released in 2002. It included interpretations of works by Edwin Morgan, E. E. Cummings, and William Blake. The gentle, introspective Holy Love followed in 2004, featuring contributions by dobro player Jerry Douglas and ex-Thrum vocalist Monica Queen. Strange Flowers, a more upbeat collection, was released in February 2009.

Grant also scored the film The Near Room and has collaborated with Capercaillie's Karen Matheson, performing live and writing songs for her solo records The Dreaming Sea, Downriver, and Time to Fall.

In conversation with radio presenter Billy Sloan on BBC Scotland's Music Through Midnight show on 5 June 2015, Grant revealed he was writing material and suggested it was more likely to be for a solo album than another Love and Money project.

== Love and Money reformation and new album ==
Love and Money reformed for a show at the Glasgow Royal Concert Hall as part of Celtic Connections 2011; this was intended to be a one-off but was very successful and the band subsequently decided to tour the UK. Following this, the band released their fifth studio album The Devil's Debt in 2012. A limited edition live album of their Royal Concert Hall show, Strange Kind of Love was also released.

== Butler, Blake & Grant ==
Upon being asked to perform at Celtic Connections in 2022, Grant accepted and mentioned that he would like to do a "songwriter's circle" type of show, which led to Teenage Fanclub's Norman Blake and original Suede guitarist Bernard Butler being suggested. At their debut show, Butler, Blake & Grant performed songs from each songwriter's back catalogue, with The Times calling it "a classic night." Initially agreeing to do two shows, the trio's enjoyment of the experience led to more gigs.

In March 2025, the trio released the album Butler, Blake & Grant on 355 Recordings. In March 2026 a further album, titled Murmurs, was released.

== Discography ==
=== Albums ===
- Sawdust in My Veins (Survival, 1998)
- My Thrawn Glory (Vertical, 2000)
- I Shot the Albatross (Vertical, 2002)
- Holy Love (Vertical, 2004)
- Strange Flowers (Vertical, 2009)
- James Grant & the Hallelujah Strings (Vertical, 2016)
- Butler, Blake & Grant [with Bernard Butler and Norman Blake] (355 Recordings, 2025)
- Murmurs [with Bernard Butler and Norman Blake] (355 Recordings, 2026)

=== Singles ===
- "Pray the Dawn" (Survival, 1998)
- "Hey Renee" (Vertical, 2001)
