= Stylorouge =

British graphic design studio

Stylorouge is a graphic design studio based in Yalding, Kent, formed in London by creative director Rob O'Connor in 1981.

Art work created by the studio has included record sleeve designs for bands such as Siouxsie and the Banshees for their 1981's Once Upon a Time/The Singles compilation vinyl which was certified gold, Enya, Blur (it designed the band's first logo, and was still working with them in 2013), the Cure, Gary Glitter, Morrissey, the Sisters of Mercy, Stereophonics, Killing Joke, Sandie Shaw, Adam Ant, Geri Halliwell, Catatonia, Jesus Jones, Squeeze, Crowded House, Dr. John, Simple Minds, Sarah Brightman and Menswear, as well as creating the artwork for the final Pink Floyd studio album, The Endless River (2014). It was also responsible for the design and art direction of the original posters for the British film Trainspotting, dubbed "some of the most iconic and memorable [film posters] of all time", and which inspired the poster by PolyGram for the sequel, T2 Trainspotting. The studio was also credited with adding the exclamation mark to the name of then teenage band Wham!

In 2012, an exhibition called Dream in Colour at the Aubin Gallery in London celebrated Stylorouge's thirtieth anniversary.
