= Donald Shaw (musician) =

Scottish musician (born 1967)

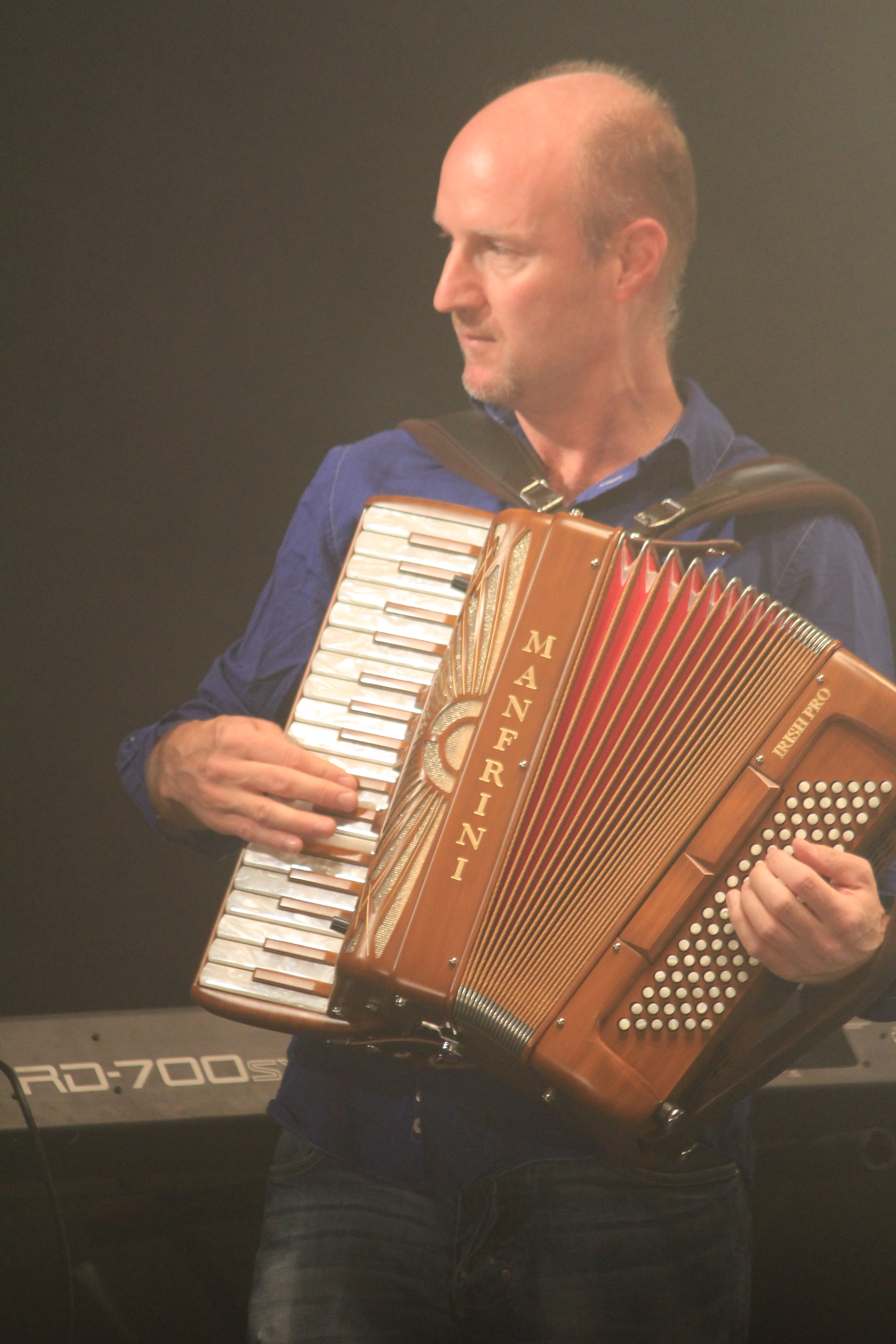
- Donald Shaw in 2013

Background information
- Born: 1967 (age 58–59)
- Origin: Taynuilt, Argyll, Scotland
- Genres: Folk music
- Occupation: Musician
- Instruments: Keyboards, accordion
- Years active: 1980s – present
- Member of: Capercaillie
- Spouse: Karen Matheson

Donald Shaw (born 1967) is a Scottish musician, composer, producer, and one of the founding members of the group Capercaillie. He has been the artistic director of Celtic Connections since 2006.

Shaw has composed for film and TV. In 2002, he won two Royal Television Society Craft and Design awards for Best Soundtrack and Best Theme for his work on the BBC Alba drama Gruth is Uachdar (Crowdie and Cream). His score for the 2000 film Transition was BAFTA nominated for best soundtrack. In 2004, he composed Harvest, a commission for the opening night of Celtic Connections. He won the Scots Trad Music Composer of the Year award in December 2006 and 2013.

== Origins ==
Brought up in Taynuilt, Argyll, a part of the world steeped in Gaelic song and traditional music, Shaw was involved in all styles of music from an early age and was initially taught the accordion by his father. After taking lessons from a local teacher, he studied under two-time All Britain Champion Sylvia Wilson. He entered the All Britain Championship at 16.

After playing in The Etives with Karen Matheson whilst at Oban High School, Shaw formed an instrumental band when he was 16, playing at the Mull Musical Festival. The band was asked to perform by the BBC and needed a singer. Shaw recruited Matheson, four years older than him, co-founding Capercaillie. He is married to Matheson; the couple have a son.

== Composing ==
Throughout his musical life, Shaw has been involved in composing for film and TV, most recently composing the music for the BAFTA nominated film, American Cousins. He also scored One Last Chance, a feature film written and directed by Stewart Svaasand. For the soundtrack of One Last Chance, Shaw recorded with Louisiana musician Dirk Powell (O Brother, Where Art Thou?) to create a score influenced by early American folk music.

In 2002, Shaw was rewarded with two Royal Television Society awards for 'Best Soundtrack' and 'Best Theme' in UK television. The RTS awards were for the drama, Crowdie and Cream, (co-composed with Charlie McKerron) and involved bringing over 20 musicians together from around the world, together with the BBC Scottish Symphony Orchestra. His 70-minute score for the feature film Transition (released in 2000) was also BAFTA nominated for best soundtrack. He won the Scots Trad Music 'Composer of the Year' award in December 2006 and in 2013.

== Producing ==
As well as film music, he has produced and recorded on more than 50 albums for artists in all areas of music, and collaborated with musicians including as Nanci Griffith, Peter Gabriel, Ornette Coleman, Dulce Pontes and Bonnie Raitt. He was musical director for the BBC arts show Tacsi, in which he produced collaborations with more than 200 musicians including Tommy Smith, Martyn Bennett and the BT Ensemble. In 2000, he launched the independent label Vertical Records.

== Celtic Connections ==
In January 2004, he composed Harvest, a commission for the opening night of the Celtic Connections festival, involving 100 young musicians from all Celtic regions of Europe. Harvest was also performed at Celtic Connections in 2006.

In 2006, Shaw was appointed Artistic Director of Celtic Connections 2007. The event celebrated its 25th year in 2018, and Shaw announced in February 2018 that he would be stepping aside as the Artistic Director of Celtic Connections.

== Discography ==
=== Appearances ===
- Hold Your Horses — Ella Edmondson (2009)
- Mark the Hard Earth - Kris Drever (2010)
- Avalanche – Ímar (2018)
