= Scottish music (2000–2009) =

During the decade of the 2000s many Scottish bands and individual performers made recordings in the rock, Scottish folk, Celtic fusion, and other genres. Scottish music received support from two public bodies: the Scottish Arts Council and Scottish Enterprise. Scotland's largest city Glasgow was described by Time magazine in 2004 as "Europe's capital of rock music", and became a UNESCO City of Music in 2008. The decade brought the deaths of Scottish musicians Kirsty MacColl and Martyn Bennett.

== Births and deaths ==
=== Deaths ===
- Kirsty MacColl (1959–2000)
- Martyn Bennett (1971–2005)

== Recordings ==
- 2000

Nàdurra, Capercaillie
Fold Your Hands Child, You Walk Like a Peasant, Belle & Sebastian
100 broken windows, Idlewild
The Great Eastern, The Delgados

- 2001

Da Farder Ben Da Welcomer, Fiddler's Bid
Loss, Mull Historical Society
The Invisible Band, Travis
Persevere, The Proclaimers
Outlaws and Dreamers, Dick Gaughan

- 2002

Time and Tide, Battlefield Band
The Remote Part, Idlewild
Storytelling, Belle & Sebastian
Blackened Sky, Biffy Clyro
Hate, The Delgados
Prentice Piece, Dick Gaughan

- 2003

Choice Language, Capercaillie
Dear Catastrophe Waitress, Belle & Sebastian
Vertigo of Bliss, Biffy Clyro
Us, Mull Historical Society
12 Memories, Travis
Born Innocent, The Proclaimers

- 2004

Franz Ferdinand, Franz Ferdinand
Young Forever, Aberfeldy
Infinity Land, Biffy Clyro
Universal Audio, The Delgados
This Is Hope, Mull Historical Society
Eye to the Telescope, KT Tunstall

- 2005

Eye To The Telescope, KT Tunstall
Push Barman to Open Old Wounds, Belle & Sebastian
Warnings/Promises, Idlewild
Croftwork, Peatbog Faeries
You Could Have It So Much Better, Franz Ferdinand
Restless Soul, The Proclaimers

- 2006

These Streets, Paolo Nutini
The Life Pursuit, Belle and Sebastian
Lucky For Some, Dick Gaughan
Esoteric Escape, Keser

- 2007

Templeton/Instinct, Desolation Yes
This Is the Life, Amy Macdonald

- 2008

Glasvegas, Glasvegas
The Midnight Organ Fight, Frightened Rabbit

- 2009

Sunny Side Up, Paolo Nutini
Tonight: Franz Ferdinand, Franz Ferdinand We'll Make Our History EP, The Void
