= Tobermory, Mull =

Largest town on the Isle of Mull, Scotland

Coordinates: 56.62°N 6.07°W

Tobermory: Scottish Gaelic: Tobar Mhoire
- Town and island capital
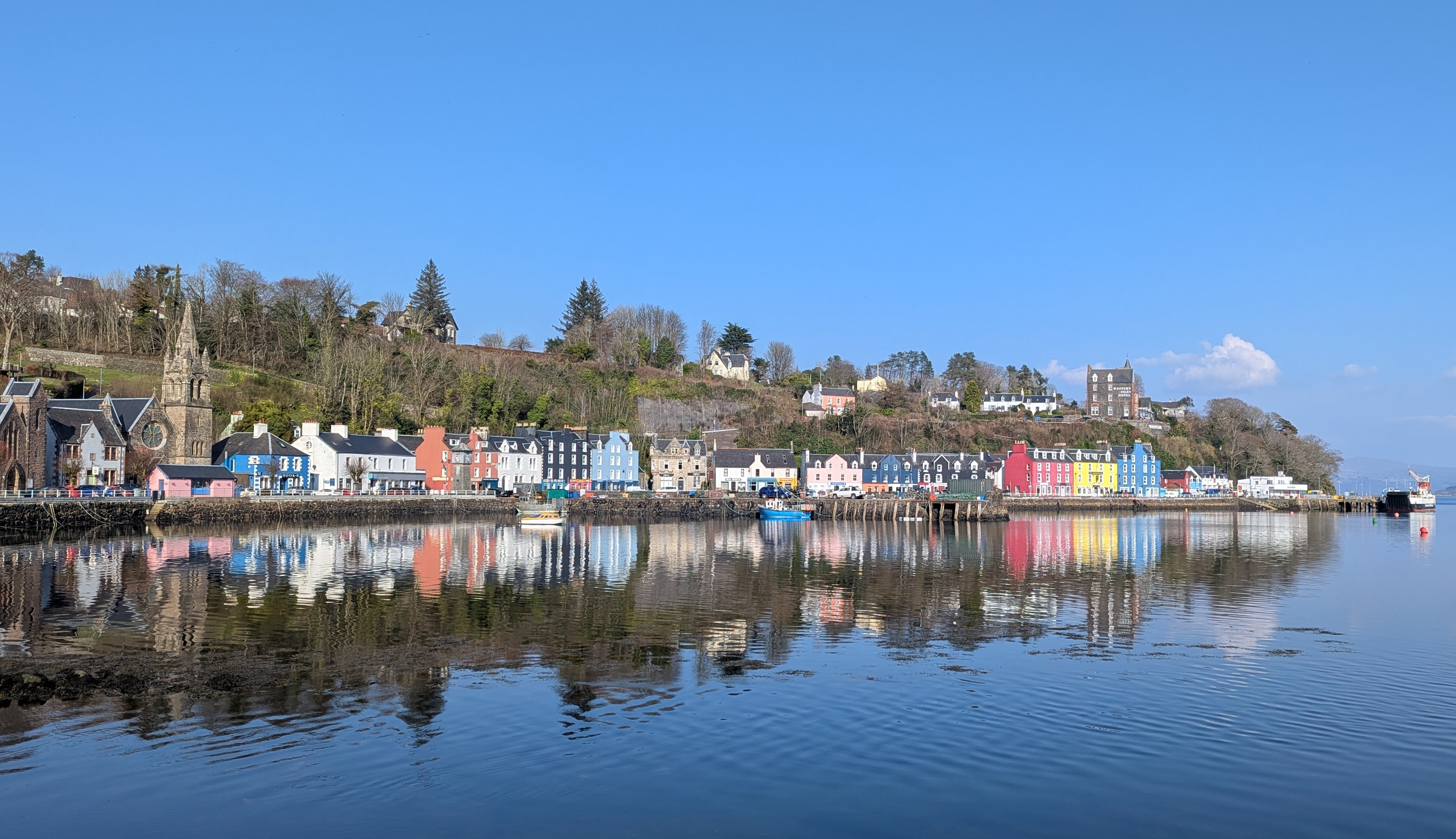
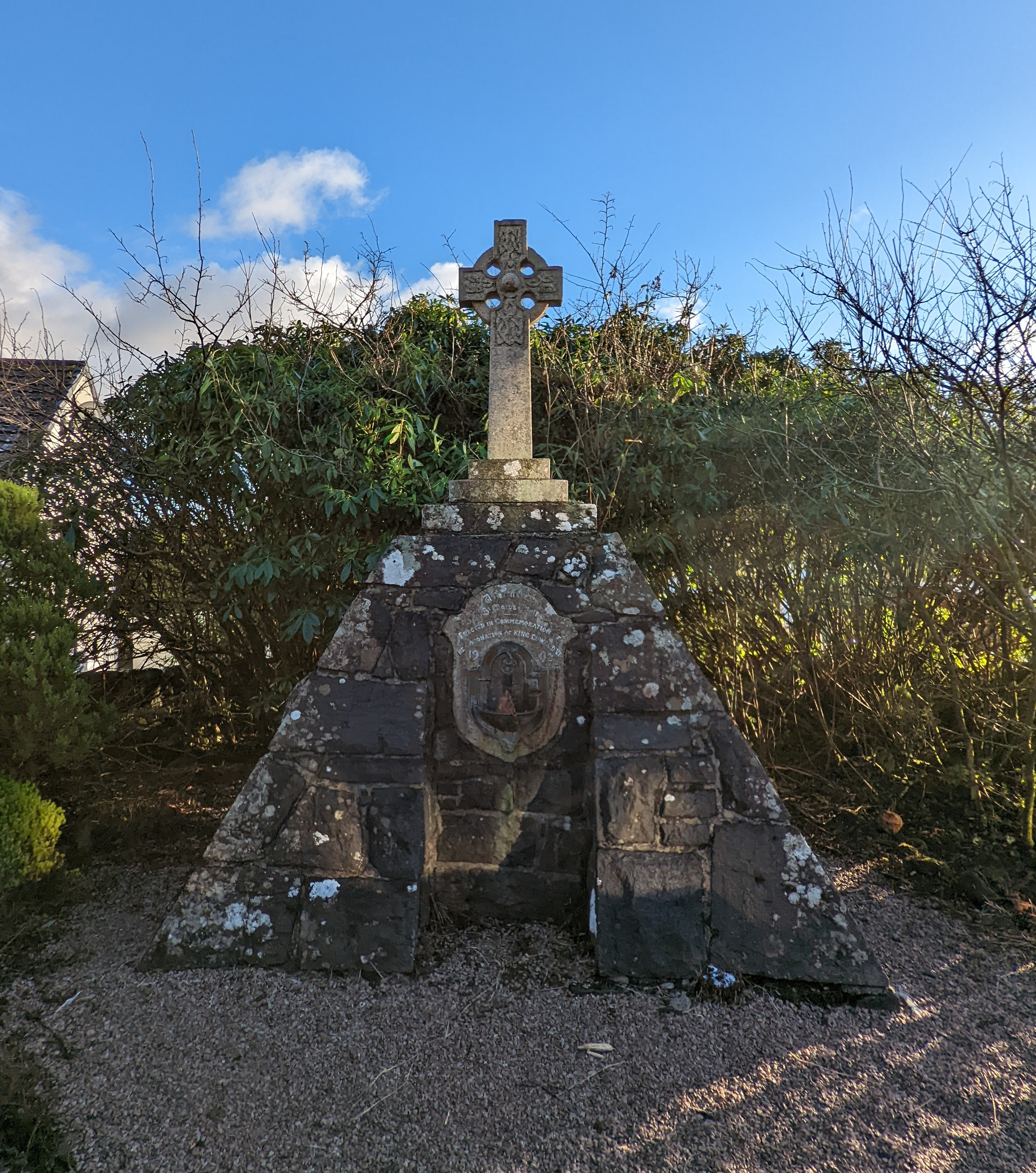
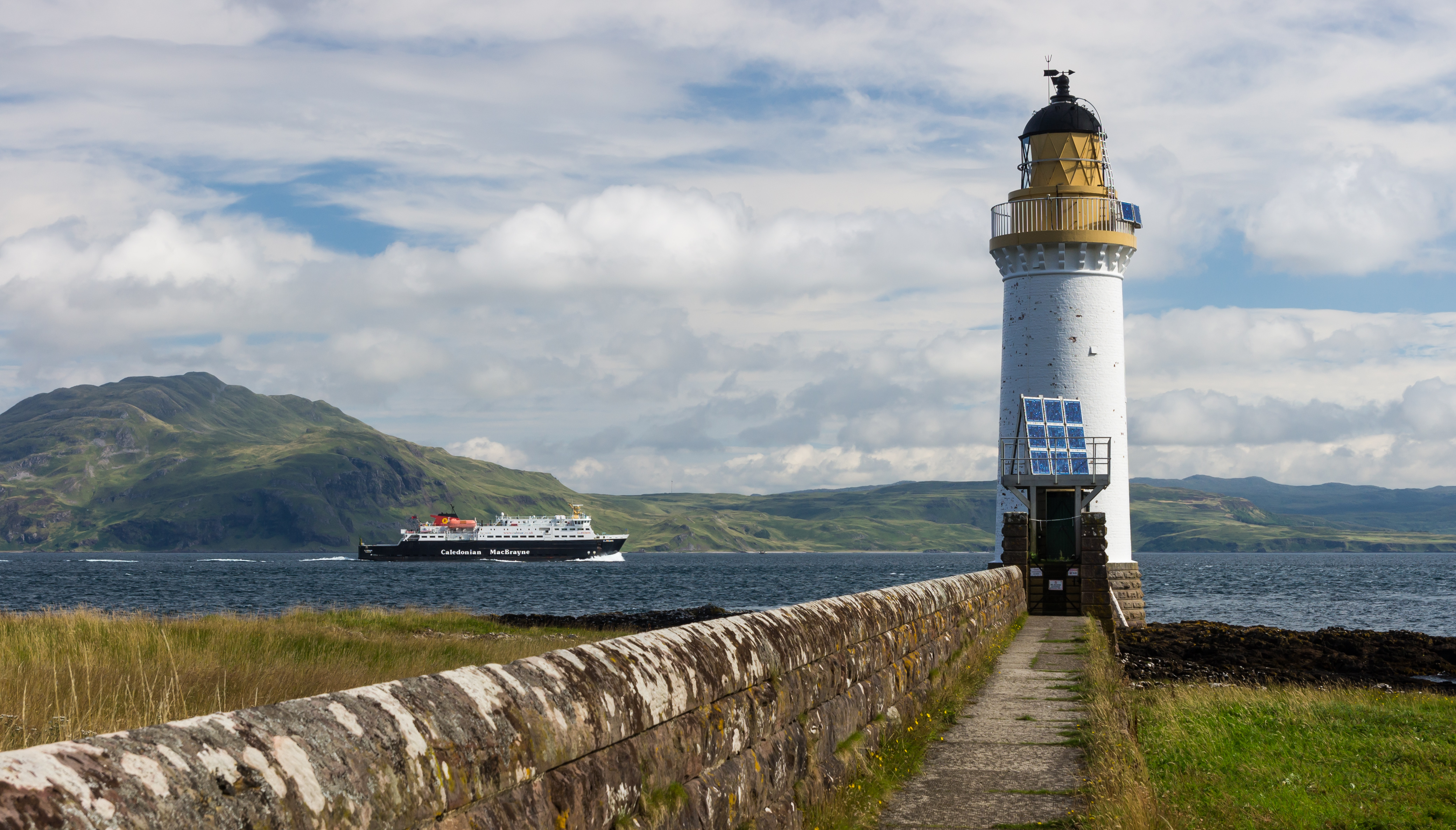
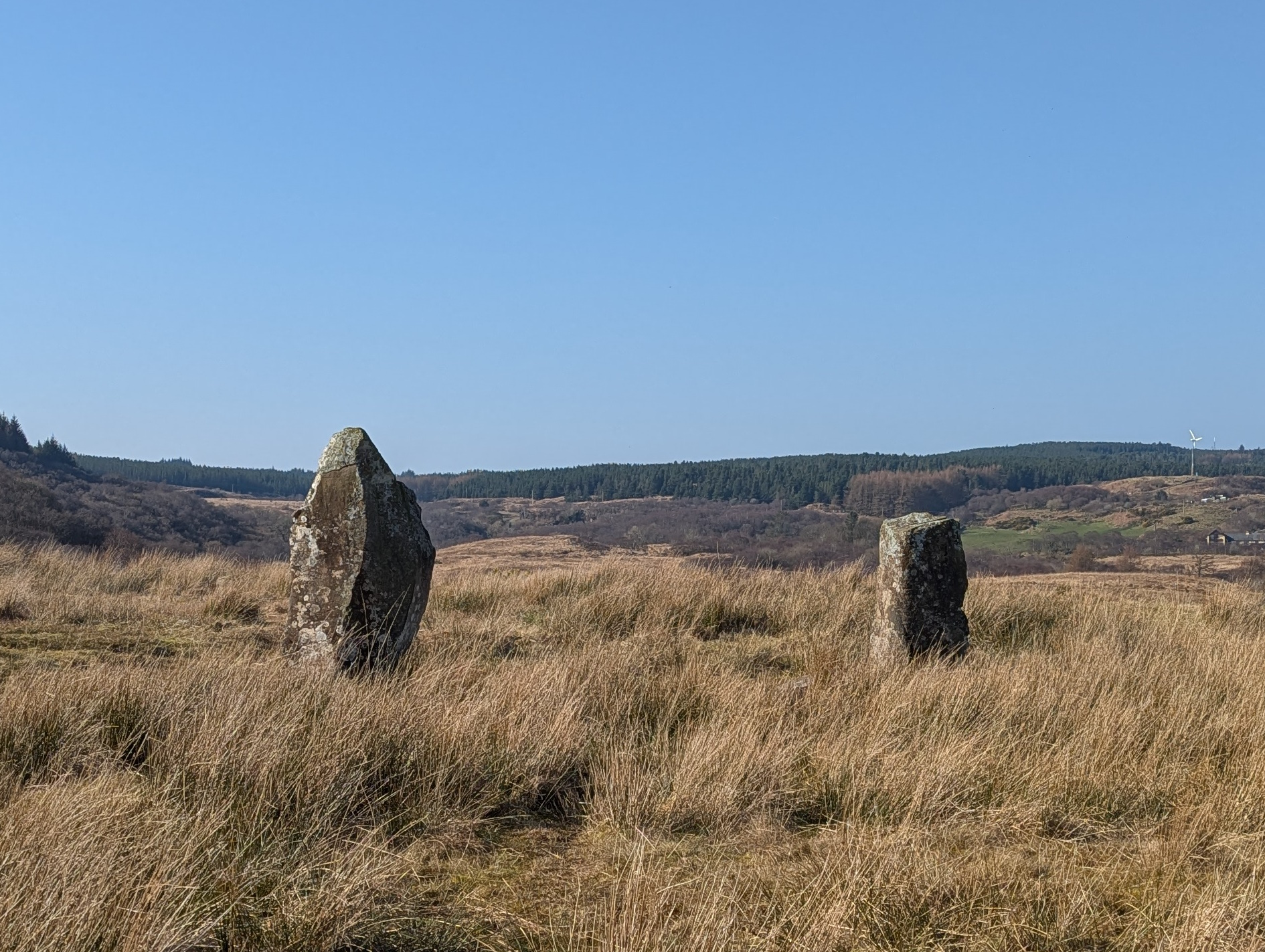
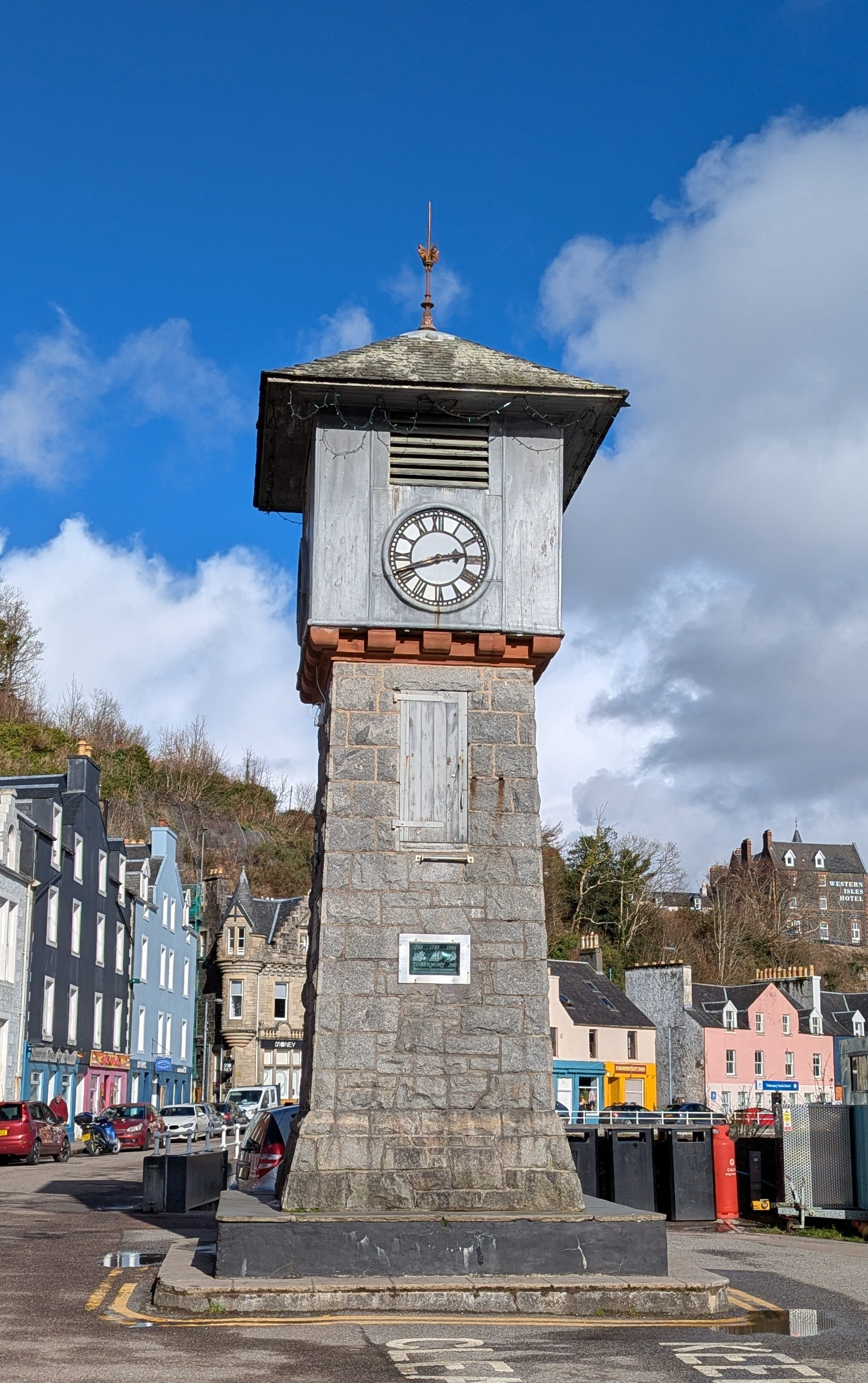
- Tobermory waterfront St. Mary's Well Nearby Rubha nan Gall lighthouse Baliscate standing stones Clock tower

- Location within Argyll and Bute
- Population: 1,045 (2022)
- OS grid reference: NM504551
  - Edinburgh: 120 mi (193 km)
  - London: 427 mi (687 km)
- Civil parish: Kilninian and Kilmore
- Council area: Argyll and Bute
- Lieutenancy area: Argyll and Bute
- Country: Scotland
- Sovereign state: United Kingdom
- Post town: ISLE OF MULL
- Postcode district: PA75
- Dialling code: 01688
- Police: Scotland
- Fire: Scottish
- Ambulance: Scottish
- UK Parliament: Argyll, Bute and South Lochaber
- Scottish Parliament: Argyll and Bute

Tobermory (Note: (/ˌtoʊbərˈmɔːri/; Scottish Gaelic: Tobar Mhoire)) (Scottish Gaelic: Tobar Mhoire) is a harbour town in the Inner Hebrides, Scotland. It is the main town and capital of the Isle of Mull, approximately 120 miles (193 km) northwest of Edinburgh, 76 miles (123 km) northwest of Glasgow, and 91 miles (146 km) west-southwest of Inverness. It had a population of 1,045 in 2022.

The mostly northerly of Mull's main settlements, it is located on the east coast of Mishnish, the most northerly part of the island, near the northern entrance of the Sound of Mull. It is here where a natural harbour, Tobermory Bay, is formed by the island meeting Calve Island. The town was founded as a fishing port in 1788 by the British Fisheries Society alongside Ullapool and Lochbay based on the designs of Dumfriesshire engineer Thomas Telford, and until 1973 was the only burgh on the island.

The area has been populated for thousands of years, however, the only visible traces of habitation before Tobermory are the Baliscate standing stones at the top of the Eas Brae in the south of the town, and the Iron Age fort of Dùn Urgadul near Sgriob Ruadh farm. Before the creation of the planned main street, Tobermory Bay was made up almost entirely of sheer cliffs, except for the flat area at Ledaig where the distillery is now located, which had to be cut away to create the main street, which was done alongside land reclamation. It gained prominence as the location for the 2000s children's programme Balamory by the BBC, which made the coloured houses of the main street famous, although they are not unique to Tobermory.

== Etymology ==
The name Tobermory is derived from the Gaelic Tobar Mhoire, meaning "Mary's well". The name refers to a well located nearby which was dedicated in ancient times to the Virgin Mary.

== Prehistory and archaeology ==
Archaeological excavations have taken place at Baliscate just outside of the town. The site was first noted by Hylda Marsh and Beverley Langhorn as part of the Scotland's Rural Past. In 2009, it was partially excavated by Time Team and a further longer excavation took place in 2012 as part of a community archaeology project through the Mull Museum.

The excavations found that there was a sixth-century agricultural settlement which was either adopted or replaced by a seventh-century Christian community with a chapel and cemetery. In the late 11th or early 12th century, a stone and turf structure was built which was probably a longhouse or hall. Then, in the late 13th or early 14th century, a wattle and turf structure was built over these earlier structures. That burnt down and was replaced by a new stone and turf structure. It was used from the 16th to 19th century intermittently. All of which showed that people had been living and working in the Tobermory area for over 1,000 years before the town was founded. The site is a listed monument.

== History ==
Legend has it that the wreck of a Spanish galleon, laden with gold, lies somewhere in the mud at the bottom of Tobermory Bay, although the ship's true identity and cargo are in dispute. By some accounts, the Florencia (or Florida, or San Francisco), a member of the defeated Spanish Armada fleeing the English fleet in 1588, anchored in Tobermory to take on provisions. Following a dispute over payment (or possibly, according to local folklore, a spell cast by the witch Dòideag), the ship caught fire and the gunpowder magazine exploded, sinking the vessel. In her hold, reputedly, was £300,000 worth of gold bullion. Other sources claim the vessel was the San Juan de Sicilia (or San Juan de Baptista), which, records indicate, carried troops, not treasure. Whatever the true story, no significant treasure has ever been recovered in Tobermory Bay.

Seventeenth-century efforts to salvage the treasure are well-documented. The Duke of Lennox gifted rights to Spanish wrecks near Tobermory to the Marquess of Argyll. In 1666, his son the Earl of Argyll engaged James Maule of Melgum to use diving bells to find treasure, and recover the valuable brass cannon. Maule had learnt diving in Sweden, but raised only two brass guns and an iron cannon, and left after three months. It was later said he had hoped to return, thinking he was the only expert diver. Argyll however raised six cannon by workmen under his direction, and next employed John Saint Clare (or Sinclair), son of the minister of Ormiston, in 1676 and a German sub-contractor, Hans Albricht van Treileben, who had worked on the wreck of the Vasa. The next year, the earl transferred the rights to Captain Adolpho E. Smith and Treileben. At this period the fore-part of the wreck was visible above water, and was called the Admiral of Florence. The project was beset with difficulties in 1678; the Admiralty disputed Argyll's rights to the wreck. Captain Smith refused to return the diving equipment to William Campbell, captain of the earl's frigate, the Anna of Argyll. The McLean clan fought the divers on land at Tobermory, led by Hector McLean, brother of Lachlan McLean of Torloisk.

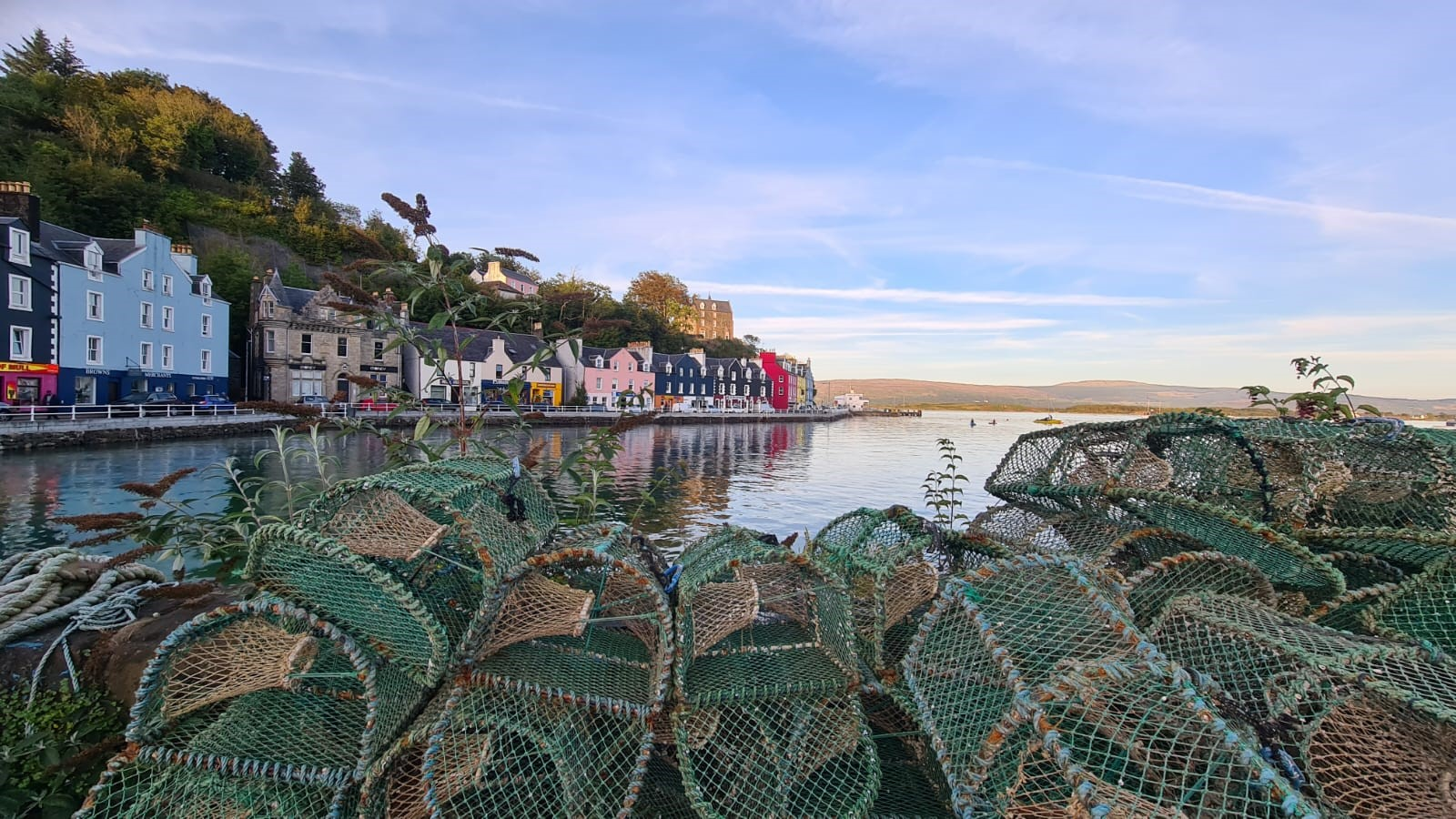
Lobster pots on the harbour wall at Tobermory

The largest attempt made to locate the galleon was in 1950 when the then Duke of Argyll signed a contract with the British Admiralty to locate the galleon. Nothing came of the attempt, apart from the development of equipment still used today to locate ancient sunk vessels. Owing to similarities in sailing conditions, in the mid-1800s emigrant sailors created the community of Tobermory in Ontario, Canada. This namesake town has twin harbours, known locally as "Big Tub" and "Little Tub", which sheltered ships from the severe storms of Lake Huron.

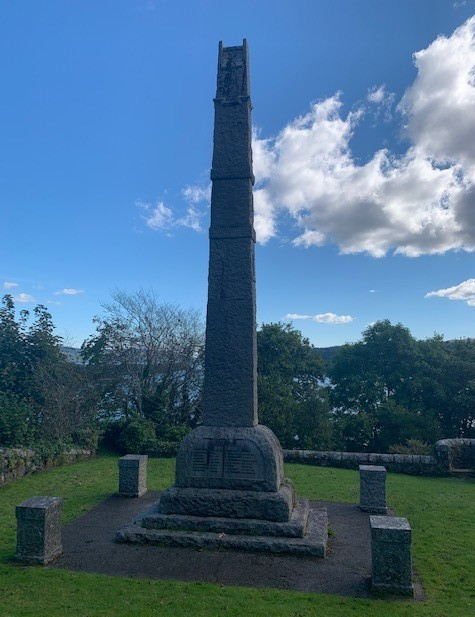
Tobermory war memorial

During the Second World War, Tobermory was home to the Royal Navy training base HMS Western Isles, under the command of the legendary Vice admiral Sir Gilbert Stephenson, the so-called "Terror of Tobermory". His biography was written by broadcaster Richard Baker, who trained under him.

== Demographics ==
In 2003, 71% of Tobermory residents were born in Scotland, 23% in England, and 6% elsewhere.

=== Population ===
At the 2022 Scottish census, Tobermory had a population of 1,045 inhabitants, making it the most populous settlement in the Isle of Mull.

== Attractions ==
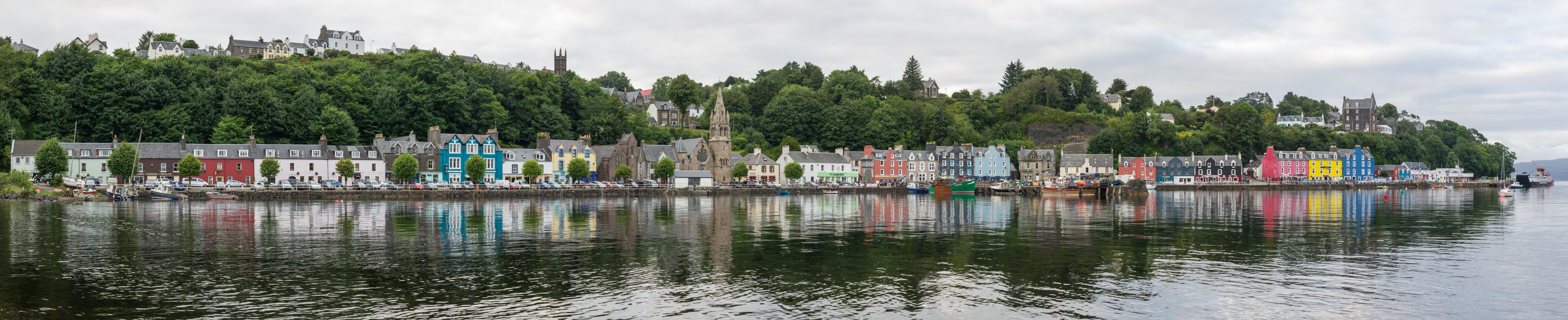
Tobermory's Main Street

Many of the buildings on Main Street, predominantly shops and restaurants, are painted in various bright colours, making it a popular location for television programmes, such as the children's show Balamory. The burgh hosts the Mull Museum, the Tobermory whisky distillery (and from 2005 to 2009 there was also a brewery, the Isle of Mull brewing company) as well as Mull Aquarium, the first catch and release aquarium in Europe. The clock tower on the harbour wall is a noted landmark. The town also contains an arts centre, An Tobar, the management of which was merged with Mull Theatre in 2012 to form the umbrella arts organisation Comar. The theatre remains based just outside Tobermory in Drumfin and is used by youth and adult dance and drama groups, hosting a wide variety of performances. Staffa Tours popular boat tours leave from Tobermory to visit the Treshnish Isles and Fingals Cave on Staffa.

Tobermorite, a calcium silicate hydrate found near Tobermory in 1880, was named after the town.

== Notable residents ==
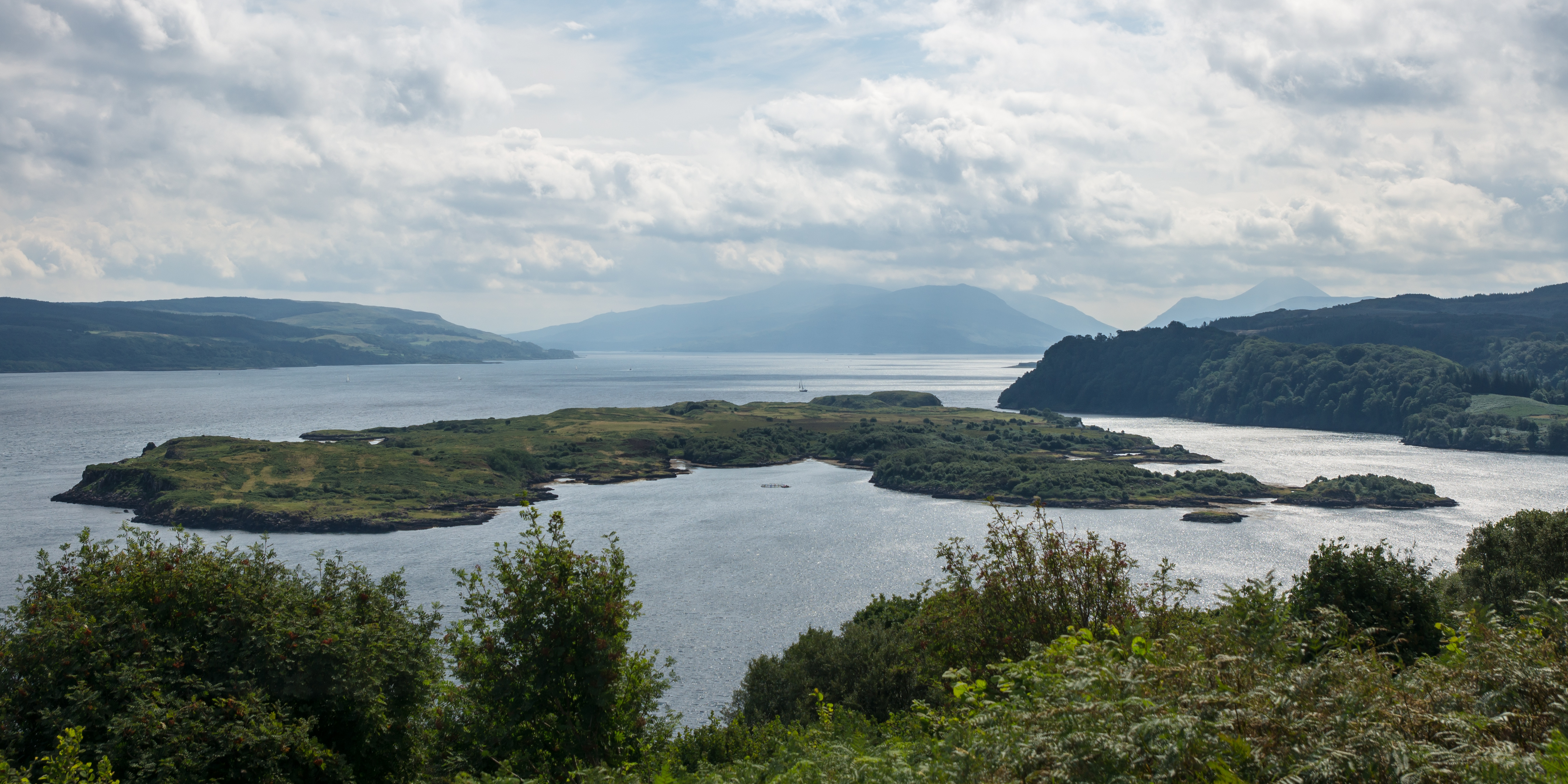
Calve Island shelters the harbour.

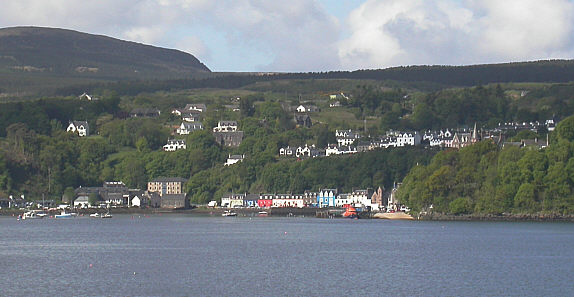
Tobermory, Mull – as viewed from the Sound of Mull

- Isabella Bird (1831–1904), the Victorian traveller and writer, frequently stayed in the town, where her sister Henrietta had a house. She often assisted the local doctor and, on at least one occasion, served as anaesthetist when he removed a tumour from a local woman. When Henrietta died, she funded the building of the clock tower as a memorial to her sister.
- Two generations of the MacIntyre family:
  - Colin MacIntyre, a singer-songwriter
  - Kenny Macintyre, sports broadcaster for BBC Scotland
  - Kenny Macintyre (1944–1999), political correspondent for BBC Scotland
- Donald McLean (1805–1864), emigrated to Canada before he was 20 and became a fur trader and explorer for the Hudson's Bay Company in the New Caledonia and Columbia Department fur districts, rising to the position of Chief Trader at Thompson's River Post (Fort Kamloops) in the then-Colony of British Columbia. He was the last casualty of the Chilcotin War of 1864; his "halfbreed" sons were known as the Wild McLean Boys and were tried and hanged for murder.
- Prof George Ritchie Thomson, military surgeon, born in Tobermory in 1865.
- John Sinclair of Lochaline (1770–1863) founded the Ledaig Distillery in Tobermory in 1798, now known as Tobermory distillery and one of Scotland's oldest surviving whisky distilleries.

== Annual events ==
The visit of the composer Felix Mendelssohn in 1829, en route to Staffa, is commemorated in the annual Mendelssohn on Mull Festival. Other highlights of the town's calendar include an annual Traditional Music Festival held on the last weekend in April, the local Mòd, which takes place on the second Saturday in September and has established itself as one of the best local Mòds on the circuit, the Mull Fiddler's Rally, also in September, and the traditional Mull Highland Games held every summer.

== Literary associations ==
The fictional town of Torbay in Alistair MacLean's novel When Eight Bells Toll was based on Tobermory, and much of the 1971 movie was filmed in the town and other parts of Mull. The writer Saki gave the name to a cat taught to speak English in one of his most famous short stories. and two well-loved children's TV series have made use of the town's name. Elisabeth Beresford called one of The Wombles 'Tobermory', and more recently the town played host to its almost-namesake Balamory for three years and when it was revived (2002–2005, 2026-). Other films made in the area include the 1945 Powell and Pressburger classic I Know Where I'm Going!. In the 44 Scotland Street series by Alexander McCall Smith (1933–), volume 7 - titled Bertie Plays the Blues - has baby triplets named Tobermory, Rognvald, and Fergus. In the children's animated feature, Nocturna, the Cat Shepherd's faithful cat, is called Tobermory.

== Transport ==
Ferries sail between Tobermory and the mainland to Kilchoan on the Ardnamurchan peninsula, but principal access to the island is via ferry between Oban and Craignure. Craignure is around 22 miles (35 kilometres) from Tobermory. This is the main route for visitors to the island. An additional ferry sails between Lochaline on the mainland and Fishnish.

Preceding station	Caledonian MacBrayne	Following station
Terminus	Tobermory–Kilchoan ferry	Kilchoan Terminus
