= Baluji Shrivastav =

Indian/British musician

Baluji Shrivastav OBE
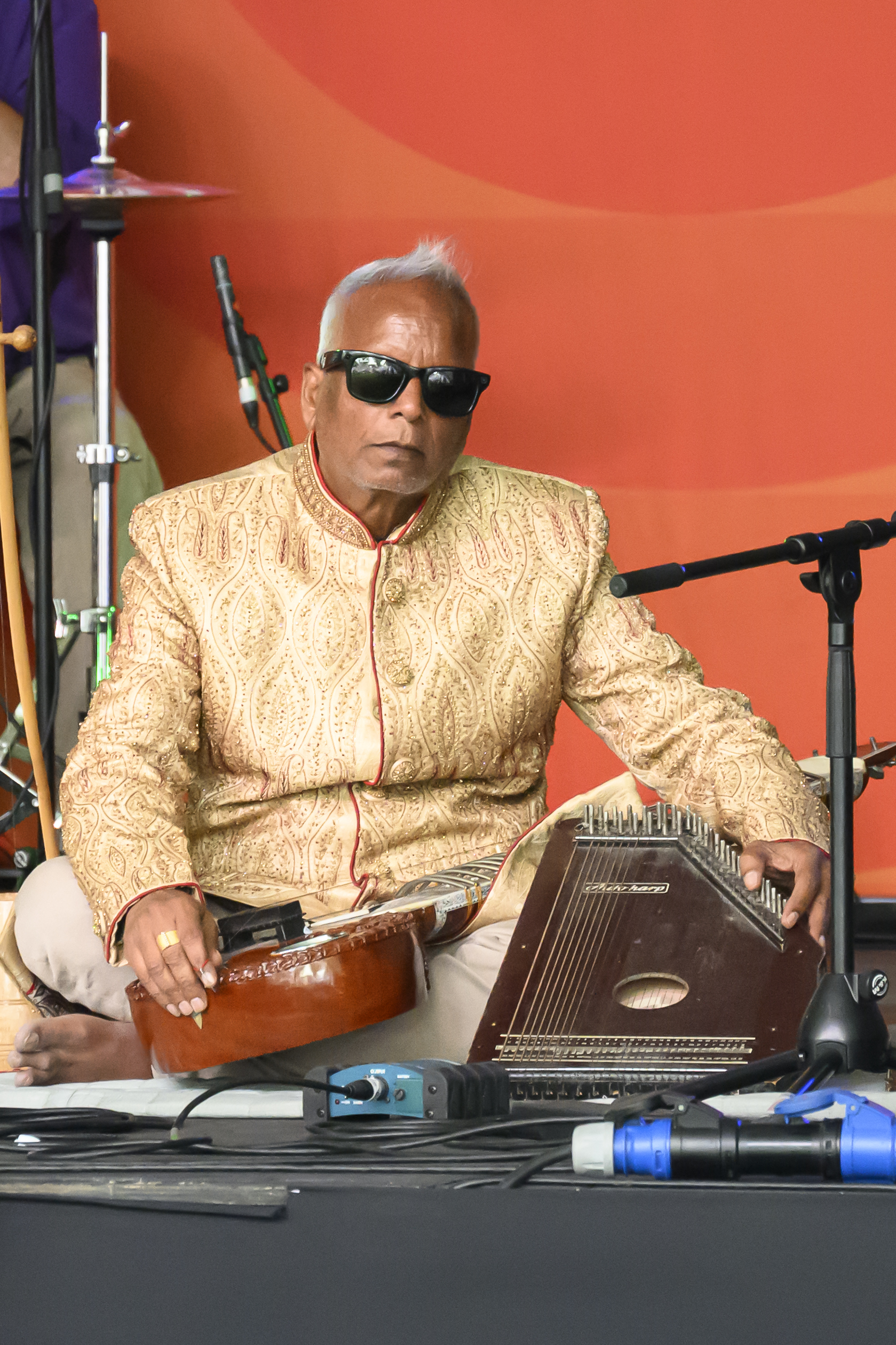
- Baluji Shrivastav 2025

Background information
- Born: Dhanoday Shrivastav; 23 January 1951 (age 75); Usmanpur, Uttar Pradesh, India
- Genres: Indian classical, rock, pop, jazz
- Occupations: Composer, musician
- Instruments: Sitar, tabla, dilruba, surbahar, pakhavaj
- Years active: 1983–present
- Label: ARC Music (1983)
- Website: www.baluji.com , www.balujimusicfoundation.org

Dhanoday Shrivastav (born 21 June 1959), known professionally as Baluji Shrivastav, is an Indian/British musician and instrumentalist who plays a variety of traditional Indian instruments including the sitar, dilruba, surbahar, pakhavaj and tabla.

== Personal life ==
Born in Usmanpur in Uttar Pradesh, Baluji Shrivastav began first studied music when he was sent away as a child to live and study at Ajmer Blind School after being blinded as a baby.

Shrivastav went on to graduate from University of Lucknow with a B.A. in Vocal Studies and Sitar. This was shortly followed by a further B.A. in Tabla and an M.A. in Sitar from Allahabad University.

Shrivastav is married to the jazz singer Linda Shanovitch.

== Musical career ==
Shrivastav performs and records with a number of different ensembles including his own group Jazz Orient/Re-Orient which has released seven albums to date. He joined Grand Union Orchestra in 1986, and has since recorded with many pop artists such as Boy George, Annie Lennox and Kylie Minogue.

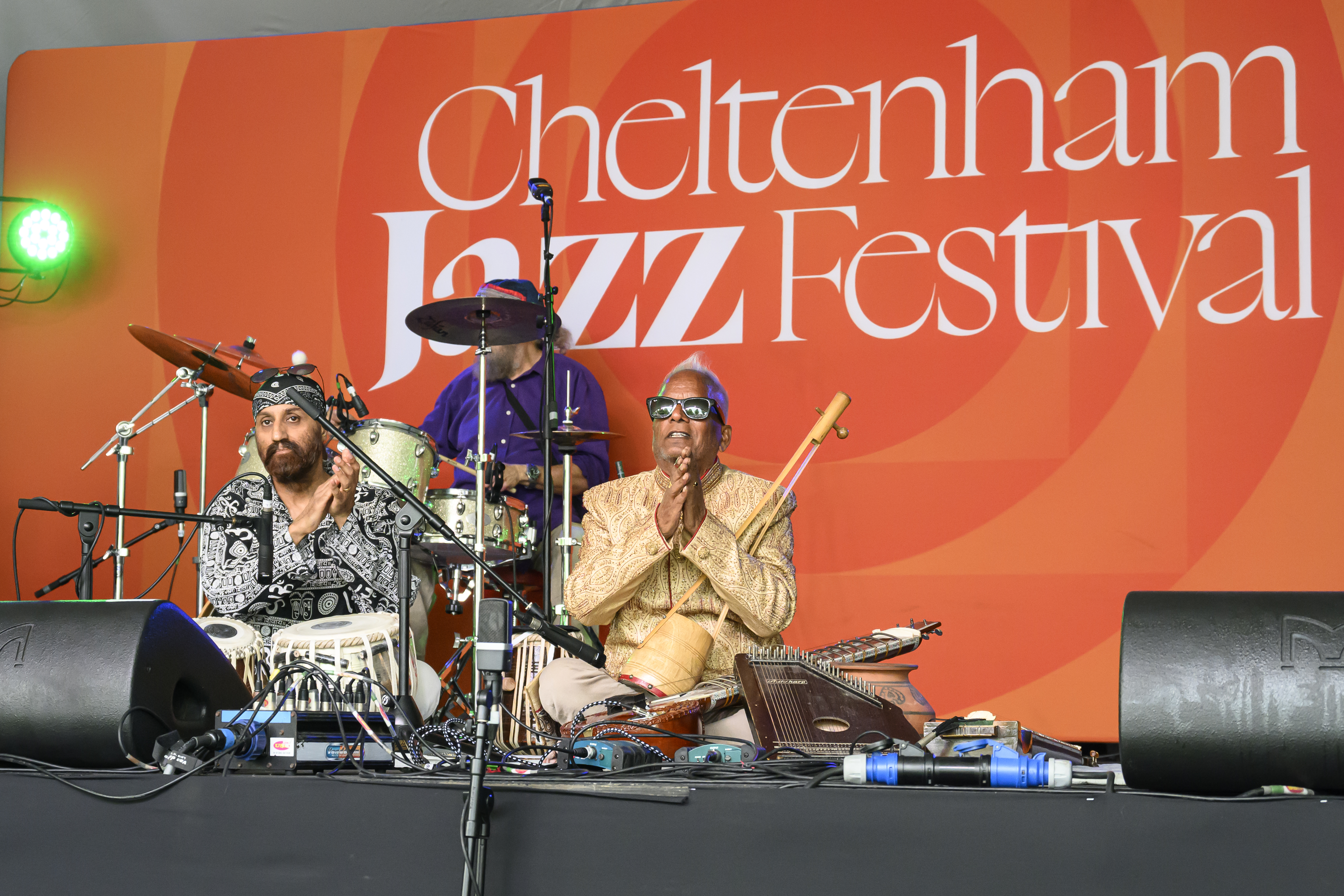
Baluji Shrivastav performing at Cheltenham Jazz Festival in 2025

In 2012, Shrivastav founded the Inner Vision Orchestra, comprising 14 blind musicians. The Inner Vision Orchestra was part funded by Arts Council England, the principal public funding body for the arts in England.

In 2012, Shrivastav performed at the closing ceremony of the London 2012 Paralympic Games alongside the British Paraorchestra and Coldplay.

Shrivastav has performed and taught all over the world and has recorded a number of albums with a wide range of contemporary artists including Doves, Stevie Wonder, Massive Attack, BT, Annie Lennox, Oasis, Kaiser Chiefs, Guy Barker and Andy Sheppard.

Shrivastav was appointed Officer of the Order of the British Empire (OBE) in the 2016 Birthday Honours for services to music.

== The Baluji Music Foundation ==
In 2008, Baluji Shrivastav established the Baluji Music Foundation, a London-based organisation which, as stated on its website, aims to promote “the understanding and enjoyment of music and performing arts from the Indian subcontinent in all its traditional and evolving forms”. The charity particularly encourages the participation of disabled people in music and has founded the Inner Vision Orchestra, composed of blind and visually impaired performers.

The Baluji Music Foundation is a charity registered with the Charity Commission in England and Wales, number 1130985.

== Discography ==
- Classical Indian Sitar & Surbahar Ragas – ARC Music (1999)
- Classical Indian Ragas: Shadow of the Lotus – ARC Music (2007)
- Indian in London – Colomna Musica (2008)
- Goddess – ARC Music (2010)
- The Art of the Indian Dilruba – ARC Music (2013)
- Re-Orient
  - Undiscovered Time – ARC Music (1997)
  - Seven Steps to the Sun – ARC Music (1999)
  - Re-Orient – ARC Music (2006)
  - Indian World Music Fusion – ARC Music (2010)
- Jazz Orient
  - Dangerous Ground – TRG Music (1991)
  - Live at the South Bank
  - Bird Dancer – Guild Music (1998)

=== Other credits ===
- Sea of Love – The Mission – Carved in Sand – Mercury Records (1990)
- Insha-Allah! (feat. Ofra Haza) – NASA – Sire – Warner Bros. Records (1990)
- The Miracle of Being – Capercaillie – Secret People – Arista (1994)
- Mizo to Abura (as Balugi) – Ken Morioka – Questions – XEO Invitation (1994)
- Volume V, Believe – Soul II Soul – Virgin Records America Inc. (1995)
- Face With Corn – Subsurfing – Frozen Ants – Apollo (1995)
- Let There Be Light (Hardfloor Dub) (as Belugi Shrivastav) – Mike Oldfield – The Songs of Distant Earth – Reprise Records (1995)
- Oi Muistatko Viela Sen Virren – Piirpauke – Ave Maria – Rockadillo Records (1996)
- Keltainen – Aikakone – Toiseen maailmaan – RCA (1996)
- The Rhythm Of Tides – Grand Union Orchestra – RedGold Records (1997)
- Now Comes The Dragon's Hour – Grand Union Orchestra – RedGold Records (2002)
- 12 For 12 – Grand Union Orchestra – RedGold Records (2011)
- If Paradise – Grand Union Orchestra – RedGold Records (2011)
