= Kenny Macintyre =

Kenny Macintyre may refer to:

- Kenny Macintyre (political journalist) (1944–1999), Scottish political journalist
- Kenny Macintyre (sports broadcaster), his son, Scottish sports broadcaster

== See also ==
- Kenny McEntyre (born 1970), American football player
