= Crosswinds (disambiguation) =

Crosswinds may refer to:

- The plural of crosswind, any wind that is blowing perpendicular to a line of travel

== Art, entertainment, and media ==
Music

- Crosswinds (Billy Cobham album), 1974
- Crosswinds (Peabo Bryson album), 1978
- Crosswinds (Capercaillie album), 1987

Other art, entertainment, and media

- Crosswinds (film), a 1951 adventure film
- Crosswinds series, a book series written by various authors, e.g., Joan Hess
- Crosswinds.net, an early free webhost and webmail provider

== Other uses ==
- Crosswinds East Metro Arts and Science School, an IB-certified middle school and high school serving nine districts in the state of Minnesota
