= At the Heart of It All =

At the Heart of It All may refer to:

- At the Heart of It All (Aphex Twin song), an Aphex Twin track that appears on the Nine Inch Nails remix album Further Down the Spiral
- At the Heart of It All (album), an album by Capercaillie, or the title track

== See also ==
- The Heart of It All
- Ohio, The Heart of It All
