= The Water =

The Water may refer to:

- The Water (Middle-earth), a river in J. R. R. Tolkien's legendarium
- The Water (Colin MacIntyre album), a 2008 album by Colin McIntyre
- The Water (San Cisco album), a 2017 album by San Cisco
- "The Water" (Feist song), a song by Canadian singer Feist
- "The Water" (Hands Like Houses song), 2020 song by Hands Like Houses
- The Water (2009 film), a short film directed by Kevin Drew
- The Water (2022 film), a drama film directed by Elena López Riera
- The Waters (stylized: "The Water[s]"), 2014 mixtape by Mick Jenkins

== See also ==
- Water (disambiguation)
