= Both sides the Tweed =

"Both sides the Tweed" is a song about the Treaty of Union between Scotland and England. Dick Gaughan made minor changes to the words and added his own tune. The song was written in 1979 and first appeared on Gaughan's 1981 album Handful of Earth. Though Gaughan's recording was embraced by music critics at the time, the song achieved wide popularity only later when it was recorded by the Scottish group Capercaillie on their 1989 album Sidewaulk.

Gaughan wrote the song in response to the result of the first Scottish Parliament referendum in 1979, which had the controversial ruling whereby a simple majority was not enough to win a devolved parliament for Scotland. Instead it required that 40% of the entire Scottish electorate, not just those who voted, had to vote yes. A non-vote was therefore effectively a "no" vote. In the referendum 52% of those who voted voted yes, but as this only amounted to 33% of the electorate, the scheme could not be realised.

"Both sides the Tweed" speaks of the corruption involved in the negotiations leading up to the Act of Union of 1707, which linked Scotland and England on terms that nationalists believe did much damage to Scottish culture. The tone of the song, however, is conciliatory and may be read as a reaction against the anti-Englishness of some Scottish nationalistic songs. The title refers to the River Tweed, which marks part of the border between Scotland and England. The song has been mentioned as a candidate in discussions about a possible new Scottish national anthem.

The song was covered by Mary Black and can be found on her albums Collected (1984) and the compilation Song for Ireland (1998).

== Authorship ==
The song was adapted by Gaughan from a traditional song attributed to James Hogg. The historic version of the song can be found in The Jacobite Relics of Scotland by James Hogg, published in 1819. Quoting a local Borders press article on the festival of the same name, Lori Watson notes that: "I've heard Dick himself acknowledge, 'when I came across it, it didn't have his name on it but Hogg's fingerprints are all over it'". Gaughan changed some lyrics and replaced the tune but the song's message is essentially the same. Gaughan himself says he is the composer, stating "So far as I am aware, I actually composed it and am highly flattered by the presumption that it is traditional, with people claiming to have known it for several decades, if not centuries...if someone can provide a printed or recorded source to prove the existence of this tune prior to 1979 then I'd be delighted to acknowledge that I unconsciously used a traditional tune."

== Original Song Text ==
Several performers have covered this song - all with slightly different lyrics. Following is the text of the original song from The Jacobite Relics of Scotland mentioned previously. Note the thematic coherence of the original words in the stanza beginning with "No sweetness".

Both sides the Tweed

What's the spring-breathing jas'mine and rose,

What's the summer, with all its gay train,

Or the splendour of autumn, to those

Who've barter'd their freedom for gain?

Let the love of our land's sacred rights,

To the love of our country succeed;

Let friendship and honour unite,

And flourish on both sides the Tweed.

No sweetness the senses can cheer,

Which corruption and bribery bind;

No brightness that gloom can e'er clear,

For honour's the sun of the mind.

Let the love, &c.

Let virtue distinguish the brave,

Place riches in lowest degree;:

Think him poorest who can be a slave,

Him richest who dares to be free.

Let the love, &c.

Let us think how our ancestors rose,

Let us think how our ancestors fell,

The rights they defended, and those

They bought with their blood we'll ne'er sell.

Let the love, &c.
