= Secret People =

Secret People may refer to:

- Secret People (album), a 2003 album by Capercaillie
- Secret People (film), a 1952 British drama film
- The Secret People, a novel by John Wyndham
