= Capercaillie (disambiguation) =

Capercaillie may refer to:

- Capercaillie, birds in the genus Tetrao
  - Western Capercaillie, often known just as "capercaillie"
- Capercaillie (band), the Scottish folk band
  - Capercaillie, an album by the Scottish folk group
