= Calve Island =

Uninhabited island on the west coast of Scotland

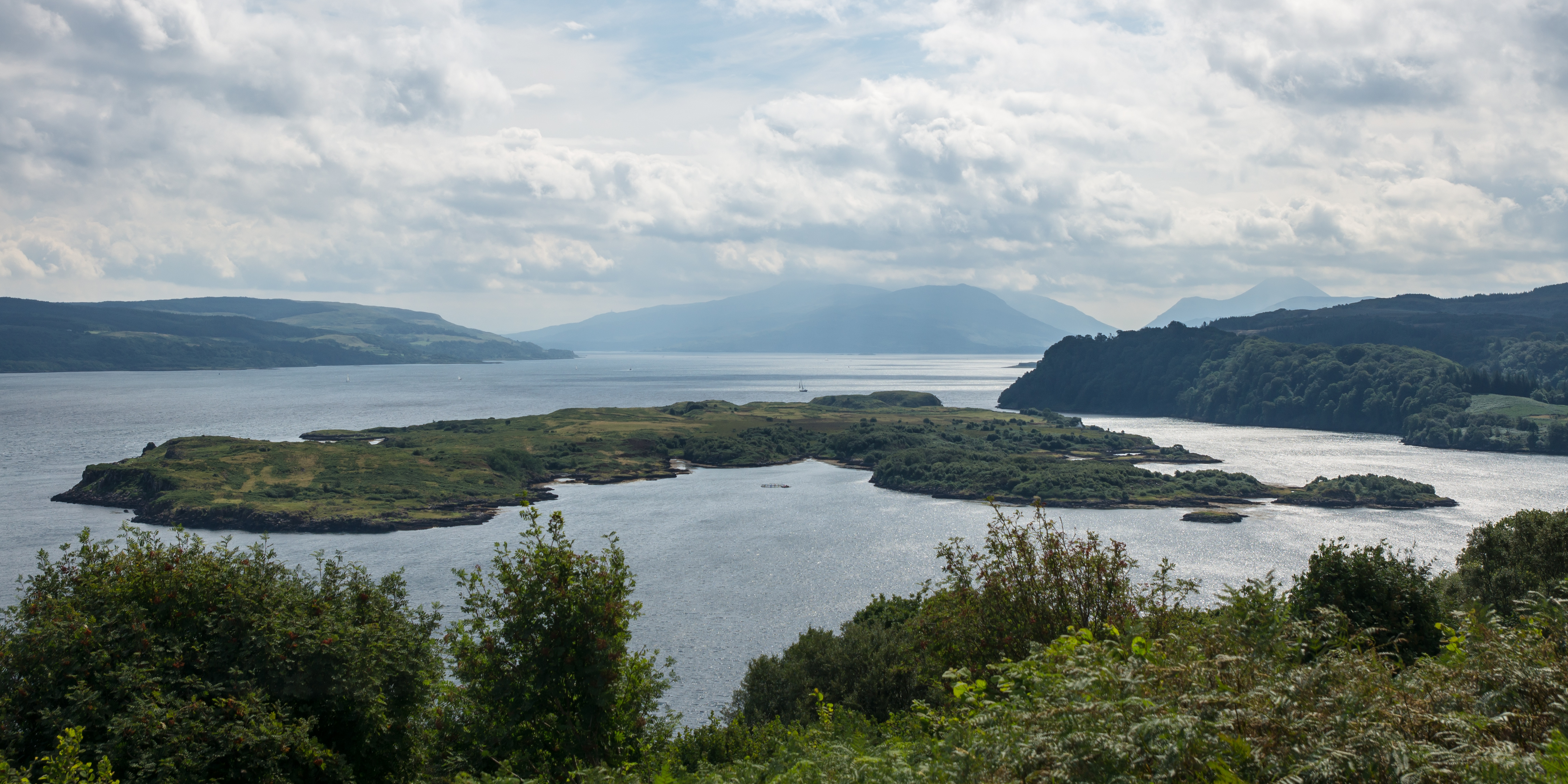
- Calve Island viewed from Tobermory Golf Course

Location
- Calve Island shown in Argyll and Bute
- OS grid reference: NM521546
- Coordinates: 56.62°N 6.04°W

Physical geography
- Island group: Mull
- Area: 72 ha (180 acres)
- Area rank: 171=
- Highest elevation: 20 m (66 ft)

Administration
- Council area: Argyll and Bute
- Country: Scotland
- Sovereign state: United Kingdom

Demographics
- Population: 0

Calve Island is an uninhabited low-lying island off the east coast of the Isle of Mull in Argyll and Bute on the west coast of Scotland. A whitewashed farmhouse with substantial outbuildings stands on the western shore, used as a summer residence. The island is 1 1/4 miles (2 kilometres) in length, and 1/2 mile (800 metres) wide at its widest point. Calve is owned by the Cotton family who make use of it in the summer months.

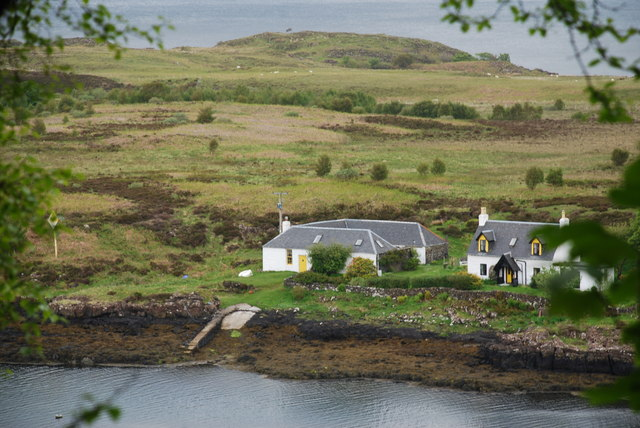
Calve Island, viewed from Afon Park, Mull

== Tidal offshore islands ==
Calve is classed as a separate island from Mull, although at its south-western point there are extreme low tides that would allow land access to it, via the small tidal island of Cnap a' Chailbhe. Between Mull and Calve runs the channel known as Dòirlinn a' Chailbhe. Calve provides some shelter for Tobermory Bay, helping to make it a safer anchorage. At the north-west of Calve is another small tidal island called Eilean na Beithe.

== Diving ==
The waters around Calve provide various popular diving sites, both on the rocky walls and reefs and at the wreck of the Pelican. The sheer wall of submerged rock, over 44 metres in depth, at the north-eastern point of the island, was named 4th in a top ten of Scotland's 'Wall dives'. It was given top marks for depth, marine life, visibility and the rock wall itself. It was only the absence of dangerous tidal currents that kept it off top spot.

== Wrecks ==
There are three wreck sites close to the coast of Calve, all of them between Calve and Mull. The oldest and most substantial is the Pelican, a steel-built paddle steamer built in Cork in 1850 and used by Caledonian MacBrayne as a passenger ferry/liner. By 1895 she was in use as a Coal Hulk in Tobermory Harbour. In a storm in December 1895 she broke her moorings and was driven across Tobermory Bay and onto rocks on Calve. When the tide fell, she slipped off the rocks and sank in 20 metres of water. At the south end of Dòirlinn a' Chailbhe lies the wreck of the Strathbeg, a motor fishing vessel which sank at mooring during a gale in May 1984. A third wreck, a single-masted smack called Anna Bhan has been identified by divers, but there is no date or details of loss.

In May 2009 the speedboat (RIB) Sooty ran aground on the northern tip of Calve at 23:30, having left Tobermory shortly before, after an evening of drinking by its crew at a local pub. It is thought that the boat was travelling at around twenty knots (40 km/h) at the point of impact, driving it a further 11 metres onto the rocky shore. Of the four men on board, one was thrown out of the boat onto the rocks and died of his injuries. It is thought that reckless speeds, insufficient attention to the GPS device, an absence of lookout and failure to prepare a passage plan all resulted from and were exacerbated by the influence of alcohol.

== Symbol of depopulation ==
In 1934 a pioneering kayak expedition was made by Alastair Dunnett and Seamus Adam around the Inner Hebrides, sending back their expedition reports to the Daily Record and Evening News. Amidst the depopulation and poverty of the islanders they found that Calve Island was farmed by a single extended family, and stayed to help with the harvest, meeting two sisters, Margaret and Janet McDonald, who were locally renowned as competitive rowers. Alistair Dunnett (who went on to become editor of The Scotsman) wrote of how Calve showed the Scottish island not as a beautiful barren waste. "It was on the contrary, a rich land, if neglected; fertile in all but faith". Undertaking another such kayak expedition in 2018, the historian David Gange was disappointed to find that, unlike the signs of revival across so much of the Hebrides, Calve has no population and minimal agricultural activity. It stood for him as symbol of the fragility and lack of resilience in the current re-population of the Scottish Islands compared to the situation before the Clearances of the previous two centuries.

== Stamps ==
Local stamps were issued for Calve Island in 1984 bearing the image of a Basset Hound. The nearest GPO post box is at Tobermory, on mainland Mull.

== Bibliography ==
- Haswell-Smith, Hamish (2004). The Scottish Islands. Edinburgh: Canongate. ISBN 978-1-84195-454-7.
