= Delirium (Capercaillie album) =

Studio album by Capercaillie
- Released: 1991
- Recorded: October 1990 at Palladium Studios, Edinburgh
- Genre: Folk rock
- Length: 48:45
- Label: Survival Records
- Producer: Dónal Lunny and Capercaillie

Capercaillie chronology
| Sidewaulk (1989) | Delirium (1991) | Get Out (1992) |

Professional ratings
Review scores
| Source | Rating |
|---|---|
| Allmusic | 4/5 stars |

Delirium is the fourth studio album by folk rock band Capercaillie released in 1991 by Survival Records. It was issued in North America by Valley Entertainment in 2002.

== Track listing ==
1. "Rann Na Móna" (Manus Lunny) – 3:50
2. "Waiting For The Wheel To Turn" (Donald Shaw) – 4:36
3. "Aodann Srath Bhàin (The Slopes of Strath Ban)" (Trad. Arr. Capercaillie) – 4:05
4. "Cape Breton Song" (Trad. Arr. Capercaillie) – 3:02
5. "You Will Rise Again" (John Saich) – 3:31
6. "Kenny MacDonald's Jigs" (N. MacDonald) – 3:58
7. "Dean Sàor An Spiórad" (Shaw) – 4:24
8. "Coisich A Rùin (Come On My Love)" (Trad. Arr. Capercaillie) – 3:13
9. "Dr. MacPhail's Reel" (Trad. Arr. Capercaillie) – 2:50
10. "Heart Of The Highland" (Saich) – 3:48
11. "Breisleach (Delirium)" (Aonghas MacNeacall/Shaw) – 2:41
12. "Islay Ranter's Reels" (Trad. Arr. Capercaillie) – 3:03
13. "Servant To The Slave" (M. Lunny) – 5:44

== Credits ==
=== Capercaillie ===
- Karen Matheson - vocals
- Marc Duff - Whistles, Bodhran, Wind Synthesiser
- Manus Lunny - Bouzouki, Guitar, Vocals on tracks 1 and 13
- Charlie McKerron - Fiddle
- John Saich - Bass, Guitar on track 10, Vocals on tracks 5 and 10
- Donald Shaw - Accordion, Keyboards

=== Guest musicians ===
- Ronnie Goodman - Percussion and drums
- Noel Bridgeman - Drums on track 3
- Graham Dickson - Drum programming
- Jon Turner - Drum programming
