= Nadurra =

Studio album by Capercaillie
- Released: 2000
- Genre: Folk rock
- Label: Survival Records

Capercaillie chronology
Glenfinnan (Songs of the '45) (1998)	Nadurra (2000)	Live in Concert (2002)

Professional ratings
Review scores
Source	Rating
AllMusic	4/5 stars

Nadurra is the eighth studio album by folk rock band Capercaillie. It was released in 2000.

== Track listing ==
1. "Skye Waulking Song" - 4:38
2. "Hope Springs Eternal" - 4:36
3. "Michael's Matches" - 4:15
4. "Tighinn Air A'Mhuir Am Fear A Phosas Mi" - 3:45
5. "Hoireann O" - 4:01
6. "Truth Calling" - 4:57
7. "Argyll Lassies" - 4:47
8. "Mo Chailin Dileas Donn" - 3:56
9. "Rapture" - 3:52
10. "The Hollybush" - 5:23
11. "Gaol Troimh Aimsirean" - 5:13
12. "The Cockerel in the Creel" - 5:07
