= Beautiful Wasteland =

Studio album by Capercaillie
- Released: 1997
- Genre: Folk rock

Capercaillie chronology
To the Moon (1995)	Beautiful Wasteland (1997)	Glenfinnan (Songs of the '45) (1998)

Professional ratings
Review scores
Source	Rating
Allmusic	3/5 stars

Beautiful Wasteland is the seventh studio album by folk rock band Capercaillie. It was reissued in North America by Valley Entertainment in 2002.

== Track listing ==
1. "M'Ionam"
2. "Inexile"
3. "The Tree"
4. "Am Mur Gorm (The Blue Rampart)"
5. "Beautiful Wasteland"
6. "Co Ni Mire Rium (Who Will Flirt With Me?)"
7. "Shelter"
8. "Hebridean Hale-Bopp"
9. "Kepplehall/25 Kts"
10. "Thiocfadh Leat Fanacht"
11. "Finlay's"
12. "Sardinia"
