= George Ritchie Thomson =

Lieutenant-Colonel George Ritchie Thomson CMG FRSE

Professor of Surgery, University College, Johannesburg/University of the Witwatersrand
- In office 1920–1930

Personal details
- Born: 18 November 1865 Tobermory, Mull, Scotland
- Died: 14 March 1946 (aged 80) Edinburgh Royal Infirmary, Scotland
- Occupation: Surgeon

George Ritchie Thomson (18 November 1865 – 14 March 1946) was a Scottish military surgeon and expert on tropical medicine who served in the Second Boer War and First World War and advanced public health in South Africa.

== Life ==
He was born on 18 November 1865 near Tobermory, the son of Isabella Ritchie and her husband, John Alexander Thomson. His family moved to Glasgow in his youth and his father became headmaster of Green Street School. The family lived at 8 Morris Place on Monteith Row. He attended Glasgow High School.

He studied medicine at the University of Edinburgh graduating with an MB ChB in 1887. He undertook his internship at Glasgow Royal Infirmary then went to Tottenham Hospital in north London. In 1891 he returned to Glasgow as Assistant Surgeon to the Hospital for Sick Children, also assisting Prof Sir William MacEwan at the University of Glasgow

In 1896 he was elected a Fellow of the Royal Society of Edinburgh. His proposers were John Gray McKendrick, James Bottomley, Magnus Maclean and Alexander Galt.

In 1900 he joined the Second Boer War as a surgeon in South Africa, serving in Estcourt and Pretoria as a lt colonel in the South African Medical Corps. In 1902, at the end of the war, he was elected President of the Transvaal Medical Society. In the First World War he served in South Africa, then returned to Britain in 1915 to take charge of the South African General Hospital in Bournemouth. From there he moved to Abbeville in France as commanding officer of the South African Hospital there.

At the end of the war he set up in private practice in Johannesburg back in South Africa.

He was created a Companion of the Order of St Michael and St George in 1919.

In 1920 he was appointed as the first Professor of Surgery at the Witwatersrand University in South Africa, assisted by Dr Joseph J. Levin and the anaesthetist F. D. Mudd.

He retired in 1931 being succeeded by Prof Innes Wares Brebner.

In later life he lived at 63 Alnwickhill Road in Liberton, Edinburgh.

He died on 14 March 1946 in Edinburgh Royal Infirmary.

== Family ==
In September 1897 he married Mabel Alice Powys (1870-1943), originally from Youghal in Ireland.

They had two daughters and two sons: Kenneth Cameron Powys Thomson; Morag Eleanor Ritchie-Thomson; Commander Charles Richard Powys Thomson RN DSO - killed in WW2; and Isabello Powys Ritchie Thomson.

Eleanor married Adrian Alexander Hope in 1926. He was a barrister but became a major in the Transvaal Scottish and was killed in action in the Second World War.
