= Get Out (album) =

Compilation album by Capercaillie
- Released: 1992
- Recorded: Oct 1990 – Apr 1992
- Genre: Folk rock
- Label: Green Linnet
- Producer: Iain Morrow, Capercaillie and Dónal Lunny

Capercaillie chronology
Delirium (1991)	Get Out (1992)	Secret People (1993)

Professional ratings
Review scores
Source	Rating
Allmusic	4/5 stars

Get Out is the first compilation album of remixed studio and live tracks by folk rock band Capercaillie originally issued in 1992 and rereleased in 1999 by Survival Records with five bonus tracks. It was reissued in North America by Valley Entertainment in 2002 with new artwork.

== Track listing ==
1. "Waiting for the Wheel to Turn ('92 version)"
2. "Pige Ruadh (The Brown Whiskey Jar) (live)"
3. "Dean Cadalan Sàmhach/Servant to the Slave ('92 version)"
4. "Silver Spear Reels (live)"
5. "Outlaws (live)"
6. "Coisich, A Rùin (Walk My Beloved) (live)"
7. "Fear a' bhàta (My Boatman) (original version)"
8. "Dr. MacPhails Trance ('92 version)"

=== Reissue bonus tracks ===
9. "Distant Hill"
10. "The Reel Northern Light"
11. "Mo Bhean Chomuinn"
12. "A Cur Nan Gobhar As A' Chreig (Herding the Goats from the Rocks)"
13. "Shanbally Castle/Caberfeidh"

== Credits ==
- Karen Matheson - vocals
- Charlie McKerron - Fiddle
- John Saich - Bass, Guitar
- Manus Lunny - Bouzouki, Guitar
- Marc Duff - Whistles, Bodhran, Wind Synth)
- Donald Shaw - Accordion, Keyboards
- James Mackintosh - drums on tracks 2, 4, 5 and 6
