= The Blood Is Strong =

Soundtrack album by Capercaillie
- Released: 1988
- Genre: Folk rock

Capercaillie chronology
Crosswinds (1987)	The Blood Is Strong (1988)	Sidewaulk (1989)

Professional ratings
Review scores
Source	Rating
Allmusic	3/5 stars

The Blood Is Strong is the first soundtrack album by folk rock band Capercaillie originally issued in 1988 and reissued in 1995 with six extra tracks by Survival Records. It was issued in North America by Valley Entertainment in 2000.

== Track listing ==
1. "Aignish" (J A Morrison/Kennedy-Fraser)
2. "The Hebrides"
3. "Arrival Theme"
4. "Cumha Do Dh'Uilleam Siosal"
5. "Iona Theme"
6. "Oh Mo Dhùthaich" (Trad. Arr. Capercaillie)
7. "Calum's Road"
8. "Callinish, Picts, Celts"
9. "Fear a Bhàta" (Trad. Arr. Capercaillie)
10. "Alasdair Mhic Cholla" (Trad. Arr. Capercaillie)
11. "Dean Cadalan Sàmhach" (J MacRae)
12. "Lordship of the Isles"
13. "Grandfather Mountain"
14. "Arrival Reprise"
15. "An Ataireachd Ard"
16. "Colum Cille"
17. "'S Fhada Leam An Oidhche Gheamhraidh" (M McFarlane)
18. "Downtown Toronto"
19. "Maideanan Na h-Airidh" (Trad. Arr. Capercaillie)

=== Reissue track listing ===
1. "An Gille Ban" (Trad. Arr. Capercaillie)
2. "Domhnall"
3. "An t-Eilean Mu Thuath (The Isle to the North)" (John Macleod)
4. "Fagail Bhernaraidh (Leaving Berneray)" (Macleod/Shaw)
5. "Lorn Theme: Instrumental/Moladh Bhearnaraidh (In Praise of Berneray)" (Shaw/Duff)
6. "Gun Teann Mi Ris Na Ruinn Tha Seo (Remembrance)" (MacLeod/Shaw)
7. "Aignish"
8. "Hebrides"
9. "Arrival Theme"
10. "Cumha Do Dh'uilleam Siosal"
11. "Iona Theme"
12. "Oh Mo Dhùthaich"
13. "Calum's Road"
14. "Callinish, Picts, Celts"
15. "Fear a Bhàta"
16. "Alasdair Mhic Cholla Ghasda"
17. "Dean Cadalan Sàmhach"
18. "Lordship of the Isles"
19. "Grandfather Mountain"
20. "Arrival Reprise"
21. "Am Ataireachd Ard"
22. "Columcille"
23. "'s Fhada Leam an Oidhche Gheamhraidh"
24. "Downtown Toronto"
25. "Maideanan Na H-Airdidh"

== Credits ==
- Karen Matheson - Vocals
- Charlie McKerron - Fiddle
- John Saich - Bass, Guitar
- Manus Lunny - Bouzouki, Guitar
- Marc Duff - Whistles, Bodhran, Wind Synthesiser
- Donald Shaw - Accordion, Keyboards
- Anton Kirkpatrick - electric / acoustic guitar
