= Capercaillie Live in Concert =

Live album by Capercaillie
- Released: 2002
- Genre: Folk rock

Capercaillie chronology
Nadurra (2000)	Capercaillie Live in Concert (2002)	Choice Language (2003)

Capercaillie Live in Concert is the only live album by folk rock band Capercaillie. It features a recording of the band's performance at celtic Connections in 2002. It was released by Survival Records and issued in North America by Valley Entertainment.

== Track listing ==
1. "Mo Chailin Dìleas Donn"
2. "Finlay's"
3. "Kepplehall"
  - "Kepplehall"
  - "The Osmosis Reel"
4. "Níl Sí I nGrá"
5. "The Miracle of Being"
6. "Dr. MacPhail's Reel/Cape Breton Song"
7. "The Weasel Set"
  - "Granny Hold the Candle While I Save the Chicken's Lips II"
  - "The Weasel in the Dyke"
  - "MacLeod's Farewell"
8. "Inexile"
9. "Iain Ghlinn Cuaich"
10. "Bonaparte"
11. "The Rob Roy Reels"
  - "The Road to Rio"
  - "Bulgarian Red"
  - "Shetland Reel"
  - "The Gesto Reel"
  - "Kiss the Maid Behind the Barrel"
  - "The Rob Roy Reel"
12. "Coisich A Rùin"
13. "Crime of Passion"
14. "The Tree"
