= Sidewaulk =

Studio album by Capercaillie
- Released: 1989
- Genre: Folk rock
- Label: Green Linnet
- Producer: Dónal Lunny

Capercaillie chronology
The Blood Is Strong (1988)	Sidewaulk (1989)	Delirium (1991)

Professional ratings
Review scores
Source	Rating
Allmusic	link

Sidewaulk is the third studio album by folk rock band Capercaillie.

== Track listing ==
1. "Alasdair Mhic Cholla Ghasda" (Trad. Arr. Capercaillie) – 2:30
2. "Balindore" – 4:00
3. "Fisherman's Dream" (John Martyn) – 3:56
4. "Sidewaulk Reels" – 4:49
5. "Iain Ghlinn' Cuaich" (Trad. Arr. Capercaillie) – 3:20
6. "Fosgail an Dorus/Nighean Bhuidh' Ruadh" (Trad. Arr. Capercaillie) – 3:00
7. "The Turnpike" – 6:30
8. "Both Sides the Tweed" (Dick Gaughan) – 4:57
9. "The Weasel" – 5:17
10. "Oh Mo Dhùthaich" (Trad. Arr. Capercaillie) – 2:44
