= Roses and Tears =

Studio album by Capercaillie
- Released: April 2008
- Genre: Folk rock
- Label: Vertical Records

Capercaillie chronology
Choice Language (2003)	Roses and Tears (2008)	At the Heart of It All (2013)

Professional ratings
Review scores
Source	Rating
Allmusic	4/5 stars

Roses and Tears is the tenth studio album by the folk rock band Capercaillie, and their first one in five years. The working title of the album was Call it a Day, a reference to the band's plans to wind down their performances and eventually disband completely in 2008.

== Track listing ==
1. "Him Bo"
  - "Him Bo Hug I O (I Am in Distress)"
  - "Aman"
2. "Turas An Ànraidh"
  - "Turas An Ànraidh" (The Stormy Voyage)
  - "The Ortigueira Waltz"
  - "Gheibh Sinn Ribinnean Mora Mora" (We'll Get Great Big Ribbons)
3. "Don't You Go" (written by John Martyn)
4. "The Aphrodisiac"
  - "Hardiman The Fiddler"
  - "My Love's Wedding"
  - "The Aphrodisiac"
5. "Barra Clapping Song"
  - "O Lioba Co Leathag" (A Clapping Song From Barra)
  - "Mo Ghun Ur Sioda" (My New Silk Gown)
6. "Seinneam Cliù Nam Fear Ùr" (I Sing the Praises of the Brave Lads)
7. "Oran Sugraidh" (The Flirting Song)
8. "The Quimper Waltz"
  - "The Quimper Waltz"
  - "An Damez Kozh"
9. "Soldier Boy"
10. "A'racan a Bh'againne"
  - "Iain Mor Fada Gobhlach" (Big Tall Bow-legged Iain)
  - "A'racan a Bh'againne" (The Drake We Used To Have)
11. "Rose Cottage Reels"
  - "The Reverend"
  - "The Hare's Paw"
  - "Old New Year"
  - "Rose Cottage"
12. "Leodhasach an Tir Chein" (A Lewisman In A Foreign Country)

== Charts ==
Chart performance for Roses and Tears
Chart (2008)	Peak position
Scottish Albums Chart (OCC)	94
UK Independent Albums (OCC)	21
