= Dòideag =

Legendary Scottish witch

Dòideag (meaning "little frizzle", pronounced [ˈt̪ɔːtʲak]) was a famous legendary witch from the Isle of Mull in Scotland. According to local folklore and mythology, she was responsible for the demise of the Spanish Armada.

One legend says that Dòideag called upon her two sisters, the Islay Hag and Ladhrig Thiristeach, to help her sink the ship. They were still unable to, so they called Gormshuil of Moy. Gormshuil summoned an army of cats that ate the crew of the boat and chewed holes in the hull, sinking it.

According to another version, she was one of "Na Dòideagan" (the Doideags), who were connected with Maclean of Duart, and sank a Spanish armada ship off Tobermory, Isle of Mull. In this story, Dòideag was called upon to sink the ship by a woman who was angry that a princess onboard was trying to seduce her husband.

== Sources ==
- MacKillop, James (2017). A Dictionary of Celtic Mythology. Oxford University Press.
