= The Water (Colin MacIntyre album) =

Studio album by Colin MacIntyre
- Released: 2008
- Genre: Indie rock
- Label: Future Gods Recordings
- Producer: Nick Franglen

Colin MacIntyre chronology
This Is Hope (2004)	The Water (2008)	Island (2009)

Professional ratings
Review scores
Source	Rating
Clash	6/10 stars

The Water is the first solo album by Scottish indie pop singer Colin MacIntyre, who previously made three albums as Mull Historical Society. It was released on 4 February 2008, and produced by Nick Franglen from Lemon Jelly. MacIntyre had produced the first three albums himself. The last track, "Pay Attention to the Human", features a poem written and performed by Tony Benn. MacIntyre wrote the album in New York, his wife's home city. In 2009, Irvine Welsh used the track "You're a Star" from The Water in his comedy Good Arrows. The track "Be My Saviour" first appeared on the soundtrack of the film Stormbreaker.

== Track listing ==
1. "You're A Star"
2. "Be My Saviour"
3. "The Water"
4. "I Can I Will"
5. "Famous For Being Famous"
6. "Camelot Revisited"
7. "I Don't Have You To Ask"
8. "I Have Been Burned"
9. "Stalker"
10. "Future Gods And Past Kings"
11. "Faith No. 2"
12. "Pay Attention To The Human (featuring Tony Benn)"
