= Choice Language =

Studio album by Capercaillie
- Released: April 2003
- Genre: Folk rock
- Label: Survival Records

Capercaillie chronology
| Live in Concert (2002) | Choice Language (2003) | Roses and Tears (2008) |

Choice Language is the ninth studio album by folk rock band Capercaillie. The promo CD was issued in a cardboard sleeve with a different track listing and one alternate song title that differed from the final release ("Homer's Reel" vs "Mooney's").

== Final track listing ==
1. "Mile Marbhaisg Air A Ghaol (A Thousand Curses On Love)" - 4:34
2. "Homer's Reel" - 3:53
3. "The Old Crone (Port Na Caillich)" - 3:45
4. "Little Do They Know" - 5:28
5. "At Dawn of Day" - 5:11
  - "Air Fair An La (At Dawn of Day)"
  - "Cailleach Liath Rathasai (Grey-haired Woman from Raasay)"
6. "The Boy Who" - 4:31
7. "The Sound of Sleat" - 4:29
  - "The Sound of Sleat"
  - "The Fear"
  - "Dans Plinn"
8. "Nuair a Chì Thu Caileag Bhòidheach (When You See a Pretty Girl)" - 4:58
9. "Who Will Raise Their Voice?" - 4:48
10. "(I am in) A State of Yearning (Tha Fadachd Om Fhin)" - 4:41
11. "Sort of Slides" - 5:14
  - "Choice Language"
  - "Bring Out the Will"
  - "Come Ahead Charlie"
12. "I Will Set My Ship in Order" - 6:04

== Promo track listing ==
1. "Mìle Marbhaisg (A Thousand Curses)" - 4:34
2. "Mooney's" - 3:53
3. "The Boy Who" - 4:31
4. "A State of Yearning" - 4:41
5. "Little Do They Know" - 5:28
6. "The Old Crone (Port Na Caillich)" - 3:45
7. "Sound of Sleat" - 4:29
8. "Who Will Raise Their Voice" - 4:48
9. "Nuair a Chì Thu Caileag Bhòidheach" - 4:58
10. "At Dawn of Day" - 5:11
11. "Sort of Slides" - 5:14
12. "I Will Set My Ship in Order" - 6:04
