= Crosswinds East Metro Arts and Science School =

Former art school in Woodbury, Minnesota

Coordinates: 44°56′16.5″N 92°58′18″W

- 600 Weir Drive; Saint Paul, Minnesota 55125; United States

Information
- Established: 2000
- Closed: July 1, 2017
- Grades: 6–10

Crosswinds East Metro Arts and Science School was a year-round arts and science magnet school located in Woodbury, Minnesota, United States. Crosswinds focuses on cultural diversity, alternative learning styles, and environmental science as the foundations of its education. It provides academic and artistic opportunities for students from urban and suburban neighborhoods to achieve continuing success in a year-round program. The Perpich Center for Arts Education manages Crosswinds. Crosswinds teaches students from ages 11 to 16 (grades 6 through 10). In the beginning of the 2000s there were large gains for students of color, and with the recent conveyance, student achievement has declined significantly according to standardized state testing results.

== Houses ==
The student body of Crosswinds had been divided into six houses (Sun, Sol, Earth, Pangaea, Water, and Aquarius) before the Perpich Center for the Arts took over management.

The Crosswinds calendar is divided into four quarters, and each quarter is separated by a break. The effect of this is that Crosswinds is a year-round school, with school in June and July. Instead of a traditional summer vacation, Crosswinds students have part of the months of November, February, May, and August off. Students have the option to take elective classes called "intersession" during these break periods.

== Mission ==
Crosswinds aims to offer artistic and academic opportunities to children from urban and suburban neighborhoods to create a culturally diverse environment recognizing each student's individual learning style. The school also places emphasis onto the study of the environment.

== Arts and the Performing Arts ==
Students at Crosswinds can take one of four visual or performing art tracks. The tracks consist of Visual Art, Band, Orchestra, or Theater. The visual and performing art classes meet every day. All art areas teach the human experience through their own lenses.

== Science ==
Crosswinds teaches science with hands-on, inquiry-based experiments.

== Administration and faculty ==
Administration is shared between Perpich Center for the Arts and Crosswinds, although there is a full-time administrator at Crosswinds.

== Environment ==
Crosswinds is located next to a farm in Woodbury, MN. The building is surrounded by forest and wildlife. The school was designed specifically as an arts and environmental science integration magnet and its architecture has won awards. It sits on a beautiful 37-acre property just off I-94 and I-494 that includes wooded areas, a lake and wetlands. Students maintain a vegetable and herb garden that provides fresh produce for use in the school's kitchen. The site also includes a peace garden, butterfly garden and tree nursery, all maintained by students and staff.

== Statistics and Data ==
Crosswinds has a student body of 179 students. The student population by race is divided into 46.9% Caucasian, 19.0% Black, 20.7% Hispanic, 12.3% Asian/Pacific Islander and 1.1% Native American.

== History and Facilities ==
While its core curriculum and values have stayed the same, Crosswinds has gone through many structural changes in its history.

In 2001, Crosswinds moved to its current location — A $17 million 34.5-acre (140,000 m^{2}) site in Woodbury, Minnesota. At that time it was known as the Crosswinds Arts and Science Middle School. Before 2001, classes were held at Arlington High School in Saint Paul. During the first several weeks of the 2001-2002 school year, classes were held in the 3M headquarters in Maplewood, MN. From when the Crosswinds building opened and up until 2004 the houses of Sun, Water, and Earth each taught students from the sixth, seventh, and eighth grades in one integrated classroom. The Sol house was created the year after, to accommodate more students. As such, Sol house had only sixth and seventh graders during the 2002-2003 school year.

At the beginning of the 2004-2005 school year, the school was reorganized and the Sun house was re-purposed to contain only sixth graders, while Sol, Earth, and a new house called Pangaea became for the seventh and eighth grades only. The 9th grade was also added in the 2004-2005 school year, and the Water house was re-purposed to accommodate the high school students. In the 2005-2006 school year, the tenth grade was added and given a portion of the water house that was christened the Aquarius house.

Crosswinds has been under management of Perpich Center for Arts Education since Spring 2014. Crosswinds originally was created as part of the East Metro Integration District (EMID), made up of the St. Paul and the school districts listed above. The EMID board at several points in its governance of the school reduced funding for the school and considered closure in order to focus its integration services within its districts. In late 2012, when none of its member districts wanted to take over running the school as an integration magnet program, EMID approached Perpich to request a proposal. After managing the school under a one-year contract during the 2013-14 school year, Perpich was granted official conveyance during the 2014 state legislative session.

The new building received the international annual design award of the Council of Educational Facilities Planners International for 2002, the James D. MacConnell Award for outstanding new educational facilities, as well as awards from other organizations such as the American Institute of Architects
