= Crosswinds (Capercaillie album) =

Studio album by Capercaillie
- Released: 1987
- Recorded: CAVA studio 1 Glasgow
- Genre: Folk rock
- Producer: Shaun/The Band/Bryan Young

Capercaillie chronology
Cascade (1984)	Crosswinds (1987)	The Blood is Strong (1988)

Professional ratings
Review scores
Source	Rating
Allmusic	4/5 stars

Crosswinds is the second studio album by the folk rock band Capercaillie. It was recorded in three days and mixed in two.

== Track listing ==
1. "Puirt a Beul/Snug in a Blanket (Jigs)" – 6:11
2. "Soraidh Bhuam Gu Barraidh" – 3:28
3. "Glen Orchy/Rory MacLeod" – 3:40
4. "Am Buachaille Ban" – 3:36
5. "The Haggis (Reels)" – 6:01
6. "Brenda Stubbert's Set" – 3:35
7. "Ma Theid Mise Tuilleagh" – 3:02
8. "David Glen's" – 4:33
9. "Urnaigh a' Bhan-Thigreach" – 3:08
10. "My Laggan Love/Fox on the Town" – 4:26
11. "An Ribhinn Donn" – 2:56

== Personnel ==
- Martin MacLeod - Bass, Fiddle, Backing Vocals
- Charlie McKerron - Fiddle, Backing Vocals
- Shaun Craig - Guitar, Bouzouki, Backing Vocals, Percussion
- Donald Shaw - Keyboards, Accordion, Backing Vocals
- Karen Matheson - Lead Vocals
- Marc Duff - Recorder, Whistle, Bodhrán, Bouzouki, Backing Vocals
