= At the Heart of It All (album) =

Studio album by Capercaillie
- Released: 12 August 2013
- Genre: Celtic music
- Length: 48:20
- Label: Vertical

Capercaillie chronology
Roses and Tears (2008)	At the Heart of It All (2013)

Professional ratings
Review scores
Source	Rating
The Guardian	3/5 stars

At the Heart of It All is the eleventh studio album by Celtic music band Capercaillie.

== Track listing ==
1. "S' Och A' Dhomhnaill Òig Ghaolaich (Waulking Song)"
2. "The Strathspey Set"
3. "Ailein Duinn Nach Till Thu An Taobh-Seo"
4. "The Jura Wedding Reels"
5. "At the Heart of It All"
6. "Abu Chuibhl' (Spinning Song)"
7. "The Marches"
8. "Nighean Dubh Nighean Donn"
9. "Fainne An Dochais (Ring of Hope)"
10. "Cal's Jigs"
11. "Lament for John 'Garve' MacLeod of Raasay"

== Charts ==
Chart performance for At the Heart of It All
Chart (2013)	Peak position
Scottish Albums Chart (OCC)	55
