= Gaelic folk music =

Music of the Gaelic people

- Cultural origins: Gaelic Culture
- Typical instruments: Accordion; acoustic guitar; bagpipes; banjo; bodhrán; fiddle; flute; harp; tin whistle

Other topics
- Cape Breton Gaelic folk music; Irish folk music; Manx folk music; Scottish folk music

Gaelic folk music or Gaelic traditional music is the folk music of Goidelic-speaking communities in Ireland, Scotland, and the Isle of Man, often including lyrics in those languages. Characteristic forms of Gaelic music include sean-nós and puirt à beul singing, piobaireachd, jigs, reels, and strathspeys.

== Relation with Brythonic music ==
The six Celtic nationalities are divided into two musical groups, Gaelic and Brythonic, which according to Alan Stivell differentiate "mostly by the extended range (sometimes more than two octaves) of Irish and Scottish melodies and the closed range of Breton and Welsh melodies (often reduced to a half-octave), and by the frequent use of the pure pentatonic scale in Gaelic music".

== Gaelic music in the Americas ==
The emigration of Scottish Gaels to Cape Breton has also resulted in a unique strain of Gaelic music evolving there. A number of fiddle tunes of Irish and Scottish Gaelic origin have entered the American bluegrass and country repertoires.

== Performance ==
The session is a common setting for Gaelic music, where musicians from a given locality gather to play music in a public setting. Gaelic music is also commonly heard at folk festivals, by pipe bands and at competitions such as mods and the Fleadh Cheoil.

== Keys and modes ==
In Traditional Gaelic music, the Ionian, Dorian, Mixolydian and Aeolian modes dominate, with the keys of D Ionian, G Ionian, A Dorian and E Dorian among those popular with session musicians.

== Harmonization ==
Unlike Classical and Jazz music, modal harmonisation avoids diminished chords, as seen below for the seventh scale degree of the major scale. Seventh chords are generally limited to the II and the V positions of the chord scale.

Roman numeral	I	ii	iii	IV	V	vi	V^{6}(first inversion)
Scale degree	tonic	supertonic	mediant	subdominant	dominant	submediant	subtonic
