= Loss (Mull Historical Society album) =

Studio album by Mull Historical Society
- Released: 15 October 2001
- Recorded: February–April 2001 at Gravity Studios, Glasgow
- Genres: Indie pop, electropop, electronica
- Labels: Blanco y Negro (UK), XL (US)
- Producer: Colin MacIntyre

Mull Historical Society chronology
Loss (2001)	Us (2003)

Singles from Loss
- 1. "Barcode Bypass" Released: 13 November 2000; 2. "I Tried" Released: 19 March 2001; 3. "Animal Cannabus" Released: 9 July 2001; 4. "Watching Xanadu" Released: 28 January 2002

Professional ratings
Review scores
Source	Rating
AllMusic	3/5 stars
Drowned in Sound	8/10
The Guardian	4/5 stars
The Independent	(favourable)
NME	8/10
Pitchfork	6.1/10
PopMatters	(favourable)
Rock Sound	3.5/5 stars

Loss is the debut album of Scottish indie pop band Mull Historical Society. It includes the singles "Barcode Bypass", "I Tried", "Animal Cannabus" and "Watching Xanadu". The album reached number 43 in the UK album chart. It was inspired by the sudden death of his father in 1999 and his upbringing on the Isle of Mull. It contains samples from a Caledonian MacBrayne ferry and the waves on Calgary Bay in Mull. "Barcode Bypass" is about a small shopkeeper threatened by the supermarkets, and "Watching Xanadu" is about watching the film Xanadu.

== Track listing ==
All tracks are written by Colin MacIntyre.

No.	Title	Length
1.	"Public Service Announcer"	4:22
2.	"Watching Xanadu"	4:29
3.	"Instead"	5:43
4.	"I Tried"	4:40
5.	"This Is Not Who We Were"	3:26
6.	"Barcode Bypass"	7:05
7.	"Only I"	4:10
8.	"Animal Cannabus"	4:45
9.	"Strangeways Inside"	4:15
10.	"Mull Historical Society"	4:50
11.	"Paper Houses/Loss"	10:15

- "Loss" is a hidden unlisted track at the end of the album - "Paper Houses" ends at 5:18, and "Loss" begins after a 30-second gap.

The CD version of the album was released as an enhanced CD-ROM containing footage of Colin MacIntyre performing live acoustic versions of the songs "Barcode Bypass" and "I Tried".

== Personnel ==
- Colin MacIntyre - all vocals, electric guitars, acoustic guitars, bass guitar, keyboards, programming, tapes, baritone guitar on "Instead", whistling on "Instead"
- Emma Barlow - additional vocals on "Strangeways Inside"
- Phil Cunningham - accordion on "Only I"
- Michael Ghia - cello on "Instead"
- Brian MacNeil - additional keyboards on "Watching Xanadu", "Only I", "Paper Houses"
- Alan Malloy - bass guitar on "I Tried", "Barcode Bypass", "Paper Houses"
- Debbie Martin - flute on "Instead", "Mull Historical Society"
- Stewart Nisbet - pedal steel guitar on "Only I"
- Euan Sinclair - drums on "Barcode Bypass", "Mull Historical Society"
- Tony Soave - drums and percussion on all tracks except "Barcode Bypass"
- Iain Stewart - additional keyboards on "I Tried", "Barcode Bypass", "Strangeways Inside", "Mull Historical Society"
- Graham Weir - trombone on "Only I", "Mull Historical Society"
- Neil Weir - trumpet on "Only I", "Mull Historical Society"
- David Lee, Graham McCusker, Cameron Dick - choirboys on "Instead"

== Reception ==
Q listed Loss as one of the best 50 albums of 2001.
