= Us (Mull Historical Society album) =

Studio album by Mull Historical Society
- Released: 2003

Mull Historical Society chronology
Loss (2001)	Us (2003)	This Is Hope (2004)

Professional ratings
Review scores
Source	Rating
AllMusic	4/5 stars
Pitchfork	(5.1/10)

Us is the second album from Scottish indie band Mull Historical Society, and the follow-up to Loss. It includes the singles "The Final Arrears" and "Am I Wrong". Us (2003) received generally positive reviews; NME called it "a joyous slice of orchestral prozac". The track "The Supermarket Strikes Back" is a riposte to "Barcode Bypass" from Loss. After the album was released the record label, Warners, dropped the band.

== Track listing ==
1. "The Final Arrears" – 5:02
2. "Am I Wrong" – 3:29
3. "Oh Mother" – 3:05
4. "Asylum" – 4:38
5. "Live Like the Automatics" – 4:09
6. "Don't Take Your Love Away from Me" – 3:52
7. "Minister for Genetics & Insurance M.P." – 5:25
8. "5 More Minutes" – 3:32
9. "Gravity" – 4:04
10. "Can" – 3:42
11. "The Supermarket Strikes Back" – 4:23
12. "Clones" – 4:33
13. "Her Is You" – 1:58
14. "Us/Whiting of the People" – 7:38
15. "Can’t Do It (CD-ROM track)"
16. "You Asked Her to Marry You (CD-ROM track)"
17. "MHS Lady (CD-ROM track)"
18. "When I’m Awake (Cavum) (CD-ROM track)"
