= This Is Hope =

Studio album by Mull Historical Society
- Released: 19 July 2004
- Recorded: London
- Genre: Indie rock
- Length: 48:00
- Label: B-Unique Records
- Producer: Colin MacIntyre

Mull Historical Society chronology
Us (2003)	This Is Hope (2004)

Professional ratings
Review scores
Source	Rating
Drowned in Sound	7/10 stars
NME	8/10 stars

This Is Hope (2004) is the third album from Scottish indie band Mull Historical Society.

This Is Hope was inspired by a two-month visit to the United States, ending in New Orleans. One of its songs is about the death of David Kelly and the album also includes a recording of his grandmother.

It also contains the single "How 'Bout I Love You More" which reached no. 37 in the UK charts.

== Track listing ==
1. "I Am Hope"
2. "Peculiar"
3. "How 'Bout I Love You More"
4. "Treescavengers"
5. "This Is the Hebridies"
6. "Tobermory Zoo"
7. "Death of a Scientist (A Vision of Man over Machine 2004)"
8. "Your Love, My Gain"
9. "Casanova at the Weekend"
10. "My Friend the Addict"
11. "Len"
12. "In the Next Life (A Requiem)"
