= Secret People (album) =

Studio album by Capercaillie
- Released: 1993
- Genre: Folk rock
- Label: Green Linnet
- Producer: Dónal Lunny and Calum Malcolm

Capercaillie chronology
Get Out (1992)	Secret People (1993)	Capercaillie (1994)

Professional ratings
Review scores
Source	Rating
Allmusic	3/5 stars

Secret People is the fifth studio album by folk rock band Capercaillie. It reached number 40 in the UK album charts. It was re-released in North America by Valley Entertainment in 2003.

== Track listing ==
1. "Bonaparte" (Trad. Arr. Capercaillie) – 4:43
2. "Grace and Pride" (Manus Lunny) – 5:12
3. "Tobar Mhoire (Tobermory)" (Trad. Arr. Capercaillie) – 3:48
4. "Four Stone Walls" (John Saich) – 3:16
5. "Crime of Passion" (Donald Shaw) – 4:58
6. "The Whinney Hills Jigs" (Trad. Arr. Capercaillie) – 6:10
7. "An Eala Bhàn (The White Swan)" (Trad. Arr. Capercaillie) – 5:30
8. "Seice Ruairidh (Roddy's Drum)" (Trad. Arr. Capercaillie) – 4:24
9. "Stinging Rain" (M. Lunny) – 4:50
10. "Hi Rim Bo" (Trad. Arr. Capercaillie) – 3:34
11. "The Miracle of Being" (Shaw) – 6:12
12. "The Harley Ashtray" (Charlie McKerron/Marc Duff) – 4:06
13. "Oran" (Words: Aonghas MacNeacail Music: Shaw) – 2:24
14. "Black Fields" (John Saich) – 4:33

== Credits ==
- Karen Matheson - vocals
- Charlie McKerron - Fiddle
- John Saich - Bass, Guitar, Backing vocals, Synthbass on track 1
- Manus Lunny - Bouzouki, Guitar, Backing vocals, Vocals on tracks 2 and 9
- Marc Duff - Whistles, Bodhran, Wind Synth
- Donald Shaw - Accordion, Keyboards, Backing vocals
- James Mackintosh - drums and percussion except for track 11
- Ian Murray - Drums on track 11, additional percussion
- Donal Lunny - Bodhran on track 12
