= Kenny Macintyre (political journalist) =

Scottish political journalist

- Portrait
- Born: 19 July 1944; Oban
- Died: 30 May 1999 (aged 54); Glasgow
- Occupation: Political journalist

Kenny Macintyre (19 July 1944 – 30 May 1999) was a Scottish political journalist. Born in Oban, he spent most of his life on Mull, and became a journalist in his 30s. He was known for his work ethic and sense of humour. He was Political and Industrial Correspondent for BBC Scotland for 10 years and was also a keen sportsman. He was a son of Angus Macintyre, a poet and bank manager. Before he entered journalism he was a bank clerk, and ran a gift shop and a building business. He was the father of Colin MacIntyre, the musician, and Kenny Macintyre who is also a BBC journalist. During his career as a journalist, he charmed John Major into giving him an interview by telling him that if he refused, Chelsea F.C. would be defeated. He ambushed Margaret Thatcher by hiding in a hotel cupboard to get an interview with her. He refused an OBE. He died of a heart attack while jogging in Glasgow. Then-prime minister Tony Blair called him "an institution". He also received eulogies from Donald Dewar, Charles Kennedy, Gordon Brown, George Robertson, Alex Salmond, Michael Forsyth and Tam Dalyell. He was buried at Taynuilt with a mobile phone.
