= Kenny Macintyre (sports broadcaster) =

Scottish sports broadcaster

- Occupation: Sports broadcaster
- Notable credit: BBC Scotland
- Spouse: Abeer Macintyre
- Parent: Kenny Macintyre (father)
- Relatives: Colin MacIntyre (brother)

Kenny Macintyre is a Scottish sports broadcaster who works for BBC Scotland.

Macintyre provides match reports for Sportsound on BBC Radio Scotland and occasionally hosts the programme. He is married to former BBC Scotland colleague and Reporting Scotland presenter Abeer Macintyre.

Kenny's brother is Mull Historical Society's Colin MacIntyre and his late father, also called Kenny, was an acclaimed BBC Scotland Political Correspondent prior to his death. His grandfather was poet Angus Macintyre.
