= Capercaillie (band) =

Scottish folk band

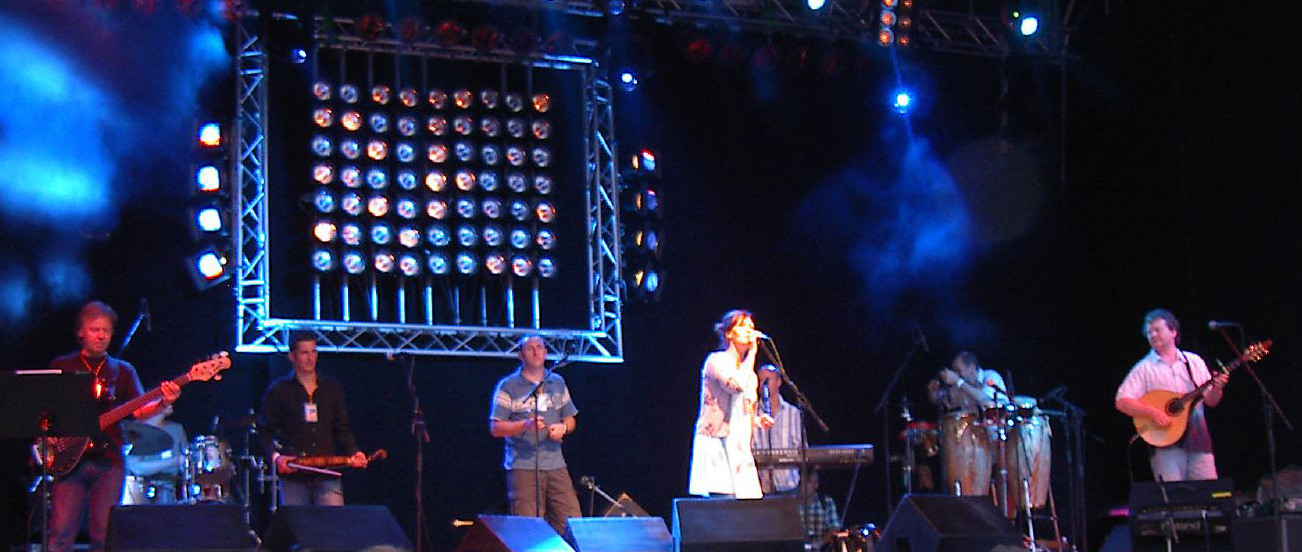
- Capercaillie at Nuremberg, 2005

Background information
- Origin: Oban, Argyll, Scotland
- Genres: Scottish folk music, traditional Gaelic music
- Years active: 1984–present
- Labels: Survival, Vertical, Valley Entertainment
- Members: Karen Matheson; Charlie McKerron; Michael McGoldrick; Manus Lunny; Donald Shaw; Ewen Vernal; Che Beresford; David Robertson
- Past members: Joan McLachlan; Anton Kirkpatrick; Shaun Craig; Martin Macleod; Marc Duff; John Saich; Wilf Taylor; James Mackintosh; Fred Morrison
- Website: capercaillie.co.uk

Capercaillie are a Scottish folk band, founded in 1984 by Donald Shaw and led by Karen Matheson, and which performs traditional Gaelic and contemporary songs in English. The group adapts traditional Gaelic music and traditional lyrics with modern production techniques and instruments such as electric guitar and bass guitar, though rarely synthesizers or drum machines.

They have sold over a million albums world-wide, including "three silver and one gold album in the UK". The BBC notes that the band has "achieved enormous global success both as a group and as individual musicians."

== Origins ==
Originating from Argyll, a region of western Scotland, the band is named after the western capercaillie, sometimes called a wood grouse, a native Scottish bird. Donald Shaw formed the band aged 16 to play at the Mull Musical Festival. After the BBC asked the band to play a singer was needed. Shaw recruited Matheson, with whom he had played in a band called The Etives whilst at Oban High School together.

== Career ==
Their first album, Cascade, was recorded in 1984. Prior to the COVID-19 pandemic, the band gave their last performance on 17 August 2019 at the Festival des Filets Bleus in Concarneau, Brittany, France. They performed live for the first time in two years on 6 August 2021 at the Wickham Festival in Hampshire.

After a further nine months off the road the band resumed touring, and between April and August 2022 performed in France, including Paris, Condette, Pas-de-Calais, Hauts-de-France, Lorient in Brittany, and on the Tatihou islet in Normandy. They also performed concerts in Inverness and Glasgow.

They performed on 26 August 2023 at the Shrewsbury Folk Festival in the town of Shrewsbury in Shropshire, England.

On 19 April 2024, it was announced the release the following month of a new album, ReLoved (on double vinyl on 10 May and on CD & streaming platforms on 31 May). The album marks the band's fortieth anniversary and is their first studio release in 11 years since 2013's At the Heart of It All. It contains new arrangements of some of the band's work recorded with the BBC Scottish Symphony Orchestra. On the same day, the album's first single, "Tobar Mhoire", was released online.

== Musical style ==
Capercaillie's repertoire includes both traditional Gaelic songs and tunes, as well as modern English-language songs and tunes, composed by other folk writers and musicians, or by members of the band. The group often adapt traditional Gaelic songs and music using modern production techniques, and often mix musical forms, combining traditional lyrics and tunes with modern techniques and instruments such as synthesisers, drum machines, electric guitar and bass.

Capercaillie's first two albums, Cascade and Crosswinds featured few modern instruments and the tunes and songs were played in a more traditional arrangement. However beginning with later albums such as Sidewaulk, and the soundtrack of The Blood Is Strong, Capercaillie began to experiment with adding funk bass-lines into certain tracks, as well as synthesisers and electric guitar. This fusion style gained Capercaillie chart success in the 1990s, on albums such as Delirium and Secret People (see Chart Success, below) and reached its peak in the albums To the Moon and Beautiful Wasteland, with the remix albums Get Out and Capercaillie being released during this period.

Capercaillie have drawn back slightly from the heavy fusion style featured on their albums the 1990s, and their more recent albums from Nàdurra (2003) up to At the Heart of It All (2013) feature more traditional arrangements and instruments, while still retaining a slight fusion feel.

The opening track from their 2000 album Nàdurra, "Skye Waulking Song", was used in the Edexcel Music GCSE Specification from 2009 to 2016. The song was in the world music section, and was used as a representation of traditional folk music combined with rock music.

== Chart success ==
Their 1992 EP, A Prince Among Islands, was the first Scottish Gaelic-language record to have a single that reached the Top 40 of the UK Singles Chart: "Coisich A Ruin" peaked at No. 39. Another single, "Dark Alan (Ailein duinn)" reached No. 65 in the UK Singles Chart in June 1995.

The album Secret People (1993) reached No. 40, and To the Moon (1995) peaked at No. 41 in the UK Albums Chart.

== Discography ==
=== Studio albums ===
1. Cascade (1984)
2. Crosswinds (1987)
3. Sidewaulk (1989)
4. Delirium (1991)
5. Secret People (1993)
6. To the Moon (1995)
7. Beautiful Wasteland (1997)
8. Nàdurra (2000)
9. Choice Language (2003)
10. Roses and Tears (2008)
11. At the Heart of It All (2013)
12. ReLoved (2024) (re-recording of previously released tracks)

=== Live albums ===
- Live in Concert (2002)

=== Soundtrack albums ===
- The Blood Is Strong (1988)
- Glenfinnan (Songs of the '45) (1998, recorded in 1995)

=== Remix albums ===
- Get Out (1992) (a compilation album of B-sides, remixes & unreleased studio and live tracks)
- Capercaillie (1994) (a compilation album of re-worked and remixed tracks)

=== Compilation albums ===
- Dusk till Dawn: The Best of Capercaillie (1998)
- Waulk Roots (1998) Tracks from early albums Crosswinds and Sidewaulk
- Grace and Pride: The Anthology 2004-1984 (2004)

== Band members ==
=== Current members ===
- Karen Matheson – vocals (1984 – present)
- Charlie McKerron – fiddle (1986 – present)
- Michael McGoldrick – flute, whistle, uilleann pipes (1997 – present)
- Manus Lunny – bouzouki, guitar (1989 – present)
- Donald Shaw – keyboards, accordion (1984 – present)
- Ewen Vernal – bass (1998 – present)
- David "Chimp" Robertson – percussion (1997 – present)
- Che Beresford – drums (1998 – present)
- James Mackintosh – drums (1992 – 1993, 2000, 2013)
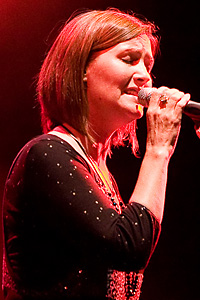
Karen Matheson

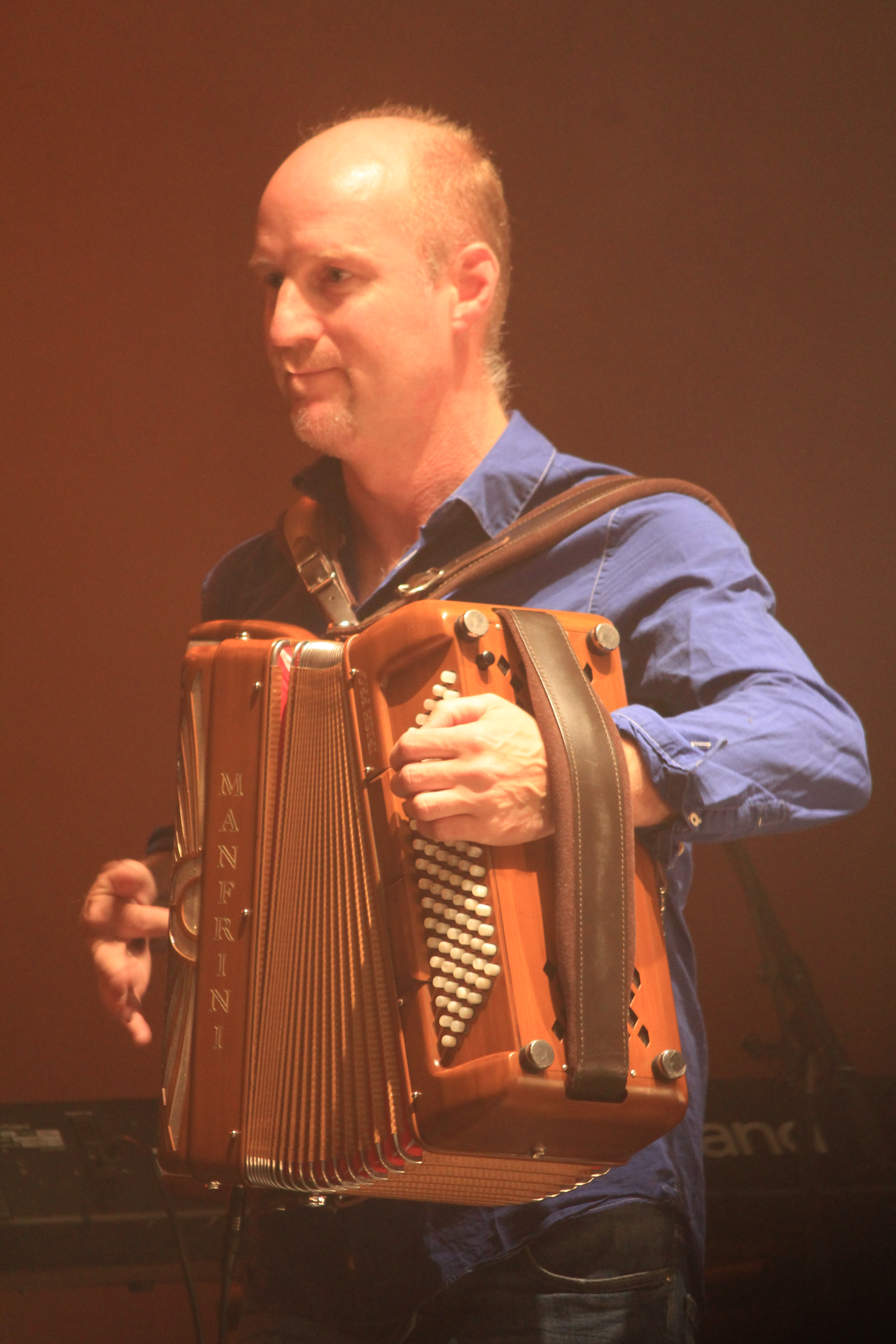
Donald Shaw

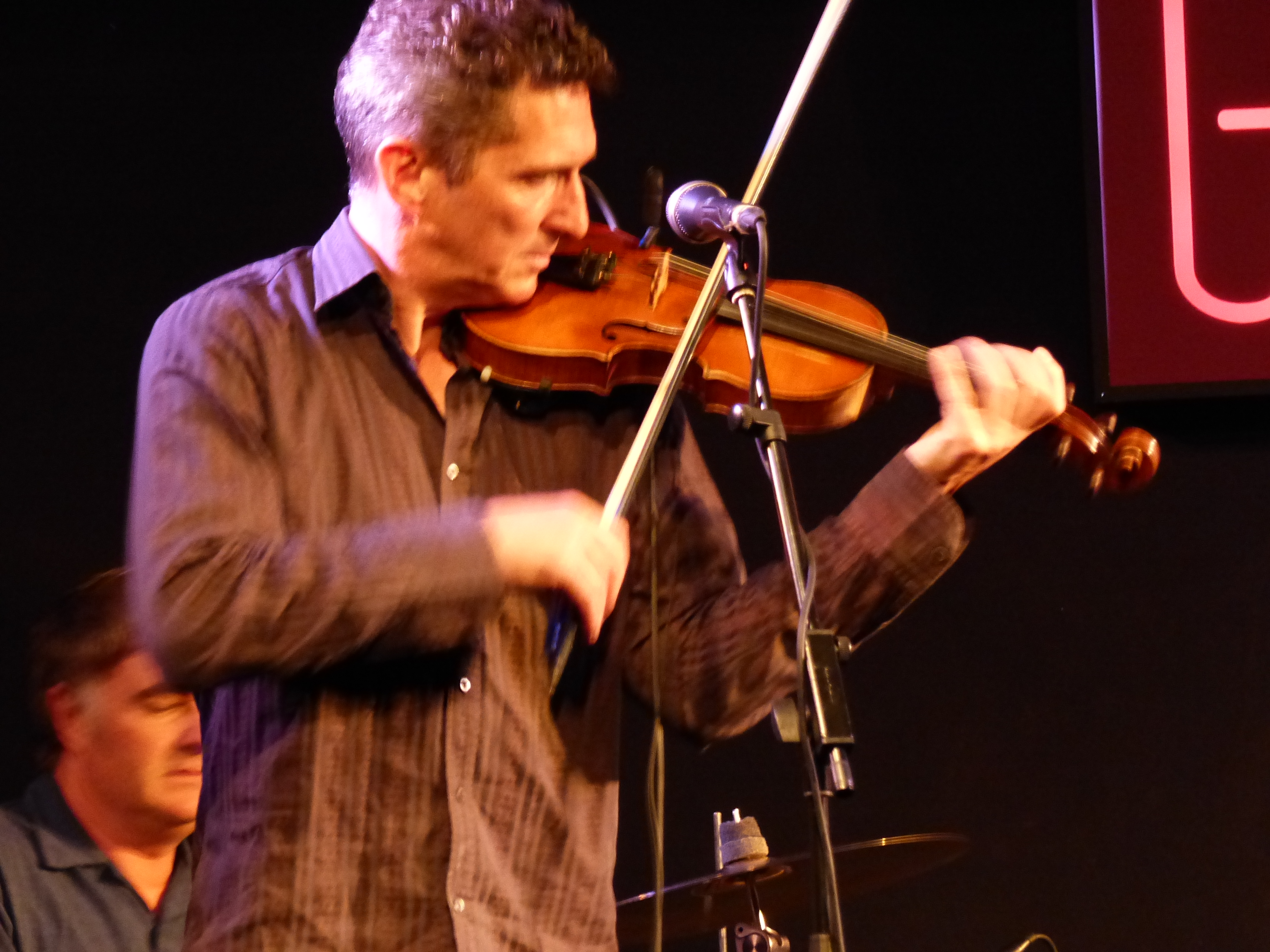
Charlie McKerron

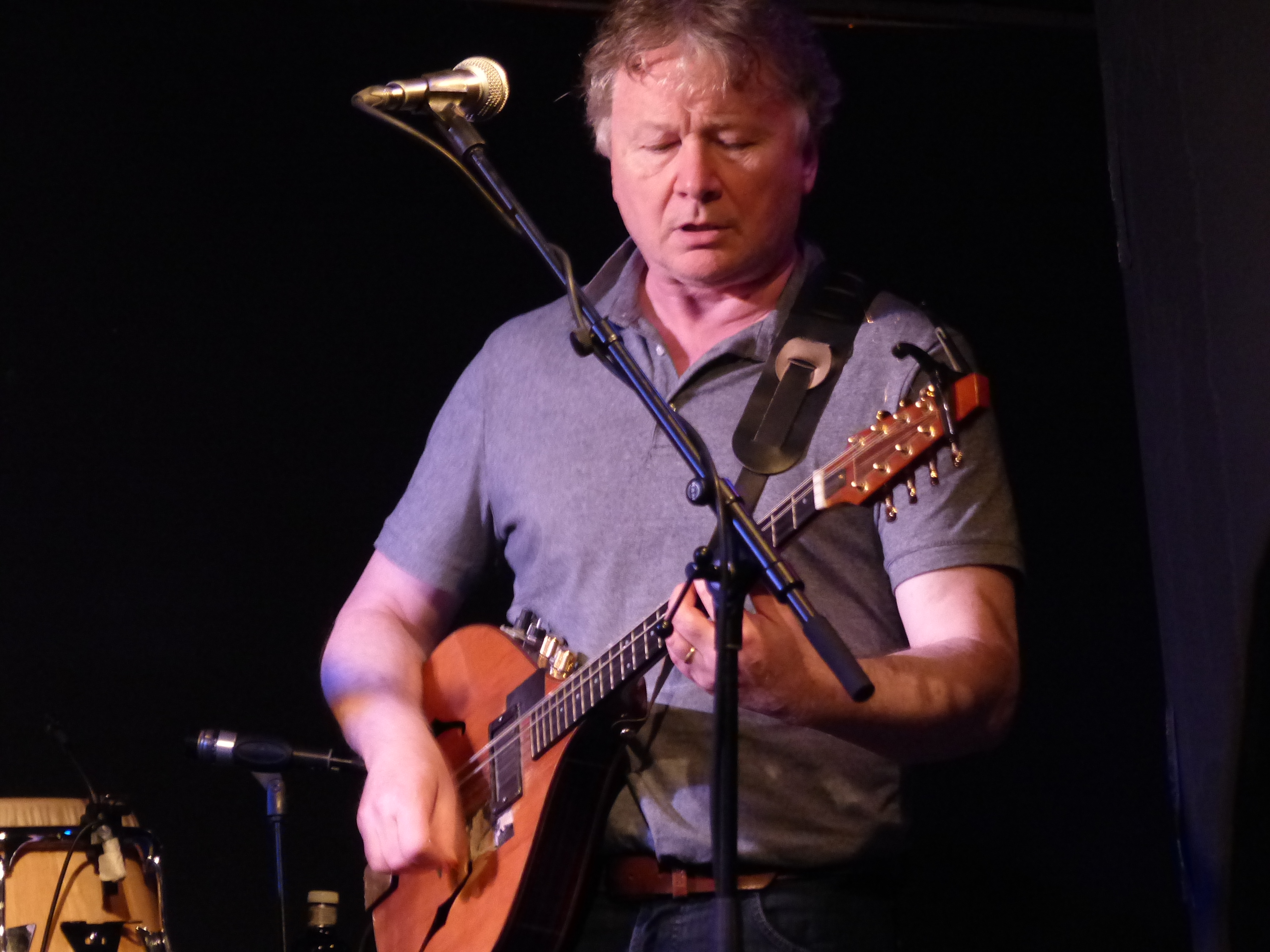
Manus Lunny

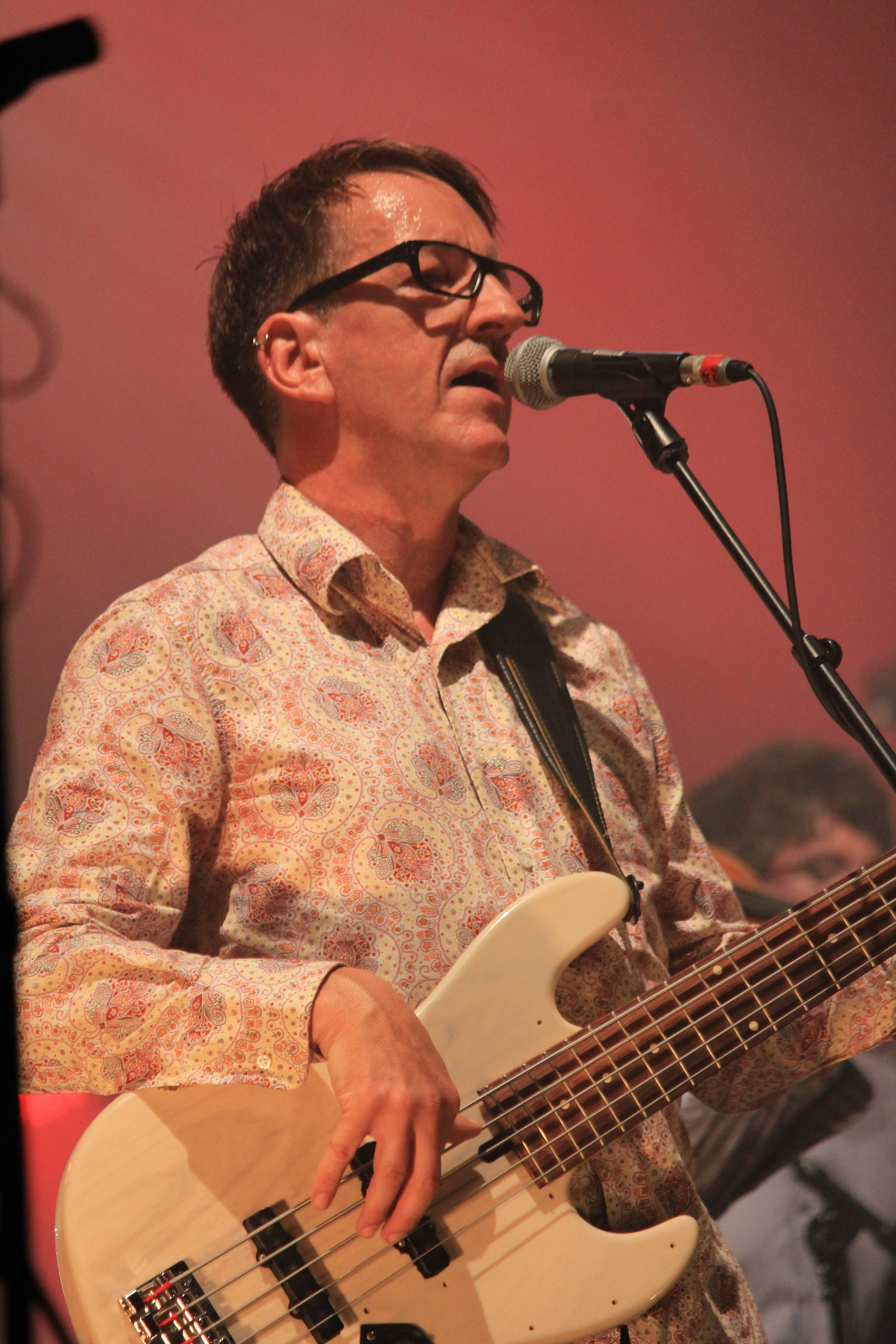
Ewen Vernal

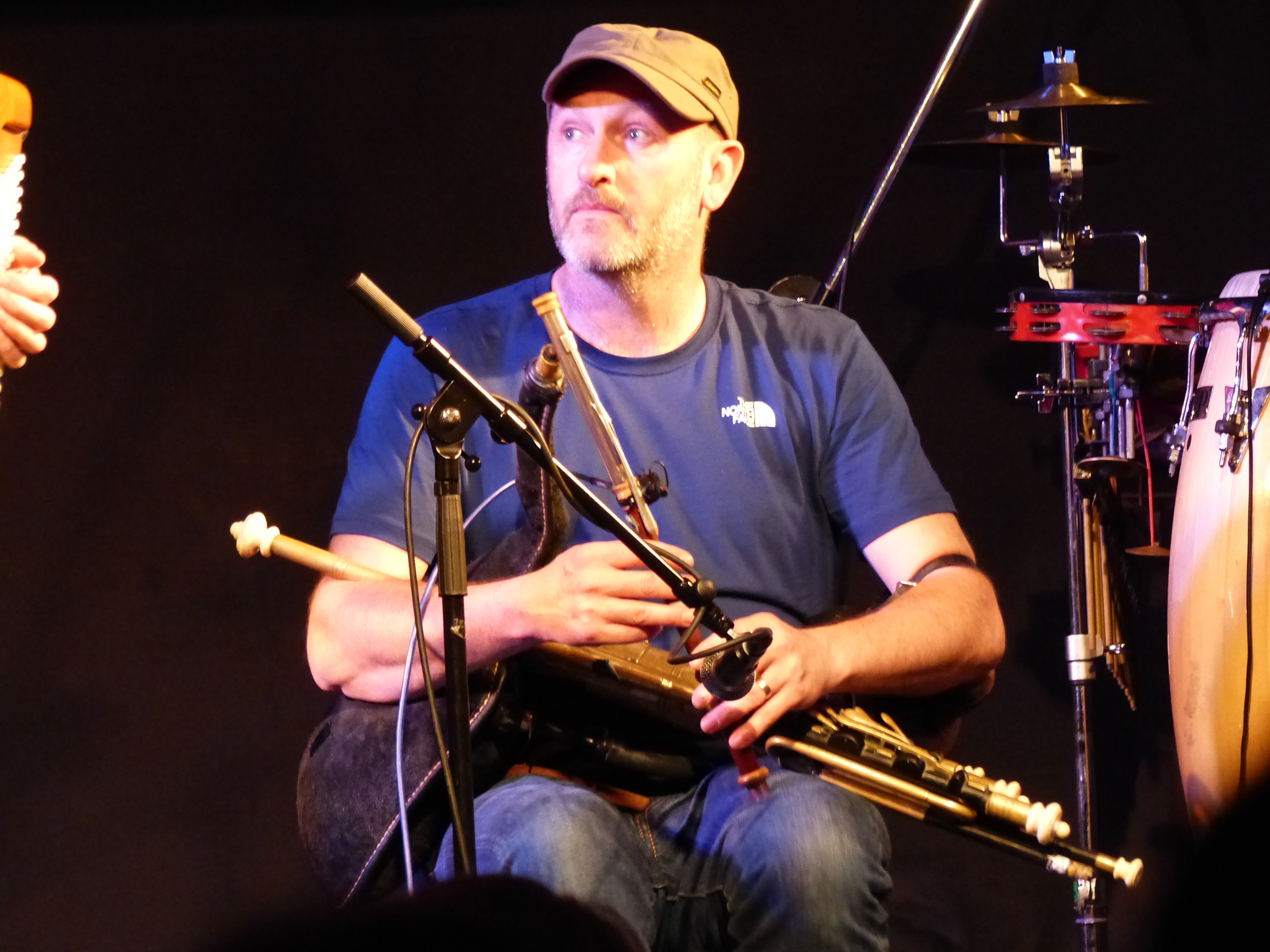
Michael McGoldrick

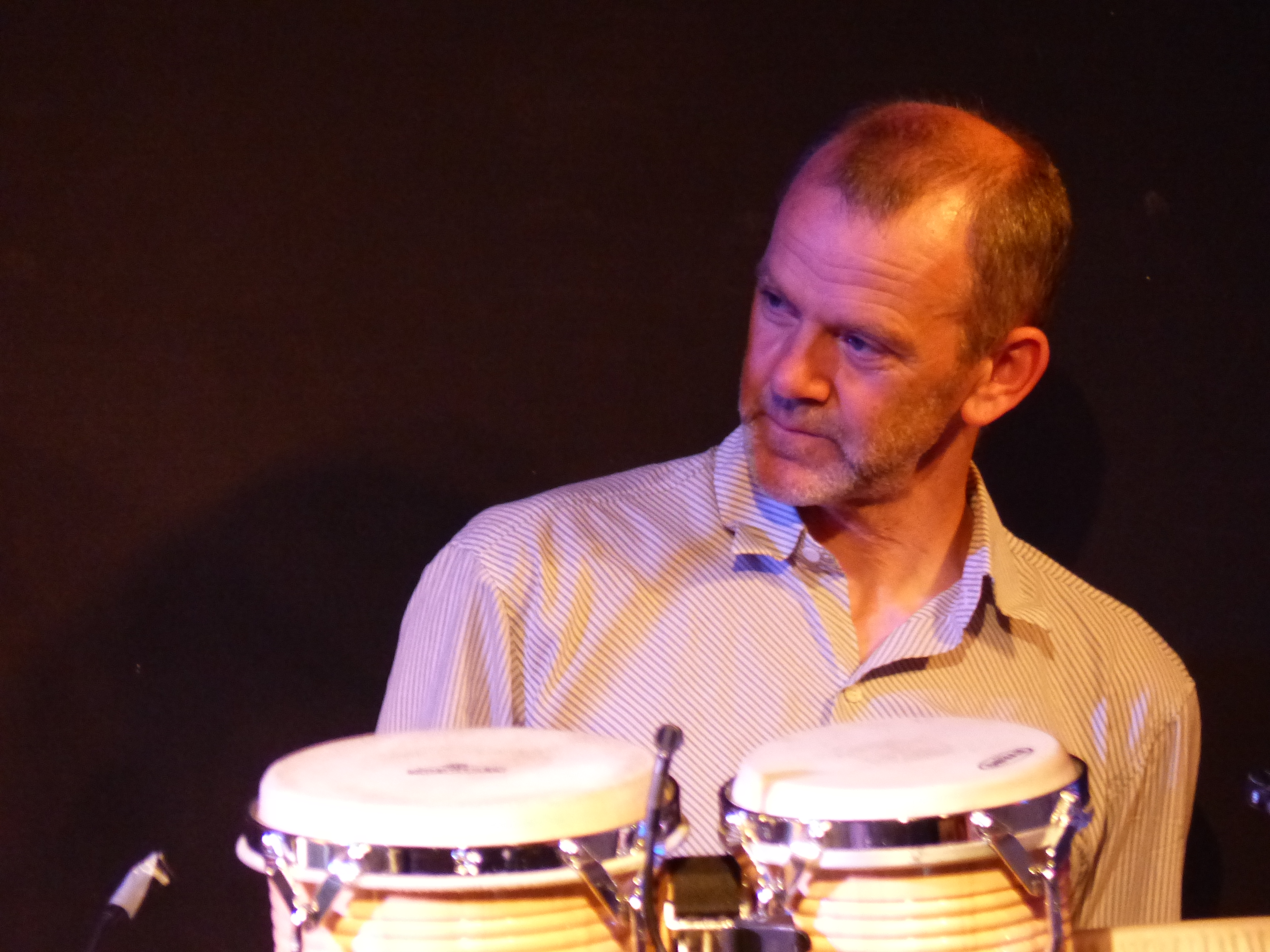
David Robertson

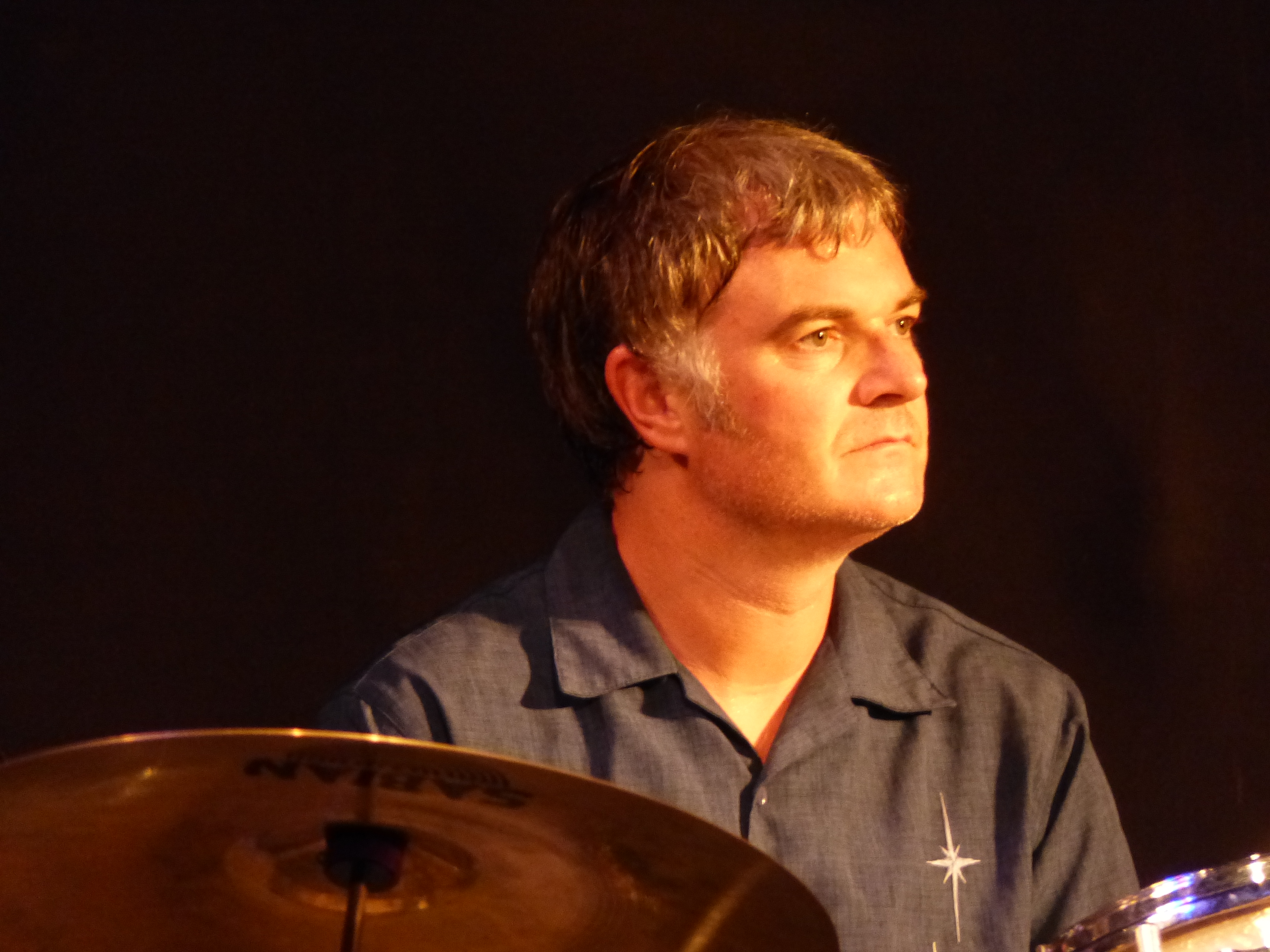
Che Beresford

=== Former members ===
- Marc Duff – whistle, recorder, wind synthesizer, bodhrán (1984–1995)
- Fred Morrison – Highland small pipes and low whistle (1995–1997)
- John Saich – bass, guitar (1988–1998)
- Shaun Craig – guitar, bouzouki (1984–1988)
- Anton Kirkpatrick – guitar (1988–1989)
- Martin MacLeod – bass, fiddle (1984–1988)
- Joan Maclachlan – fiddle, vocals (1984–1986)
