= Davy Steele =

- Born: 10 December 1948; Summerlee by Prestonpans, Scotland
- Died: 11 April 2001 (aged 52)
- Genres: Scottish Folk
- Occupations: Musician, songwriter
- Instruments: vocals, guitar, bouzouki, bodhrán
- Years active: 1980s–2000

Davy Steele (10 December 1948 – 11 April 2001) was a Scottish folk musician and songwriter. He sang with Drinkers Drouth, Ceolbeg, and was a founding member of the Scottish folk supergroup Clan Alba. In 1998, Steele joined the Battlefield Band as lead vocalist and guitarist, and he also played the bouzouki and bodhrán. He was married to Patsy Seddon, a founding member of The Poozies. They had one child together and Steele had three more children from an earlier marriage. Steele was diagnosed with a brain tumor and died on April 11, 2001, in a hospice in Edinburgh.

== Tributes ==
In 2011, ten years after his death, a tribute to Steele was presented at Glasgow's Old Fruitmarket as part of the Celtic Connections festival and subsequently released as an album, Steele the Show. Performers included Patsy Seddon, Phil Cunningham, Dick Gaughan, Andy M. Stewart, Karine Polwart, Kate Rusby, Sally Barker, Siobhan Miller, Mary Macmaster, Karen Tweed and Eilidh Shaw.

Rusby wrote and recorded the song Who Will Sing Me Lullabies? for her 2001 album Little Lights. The song is sung from the point of view of Steele's young son following his father's death.

Steele was inducted into the Scottish Traditional Music Hall of Fame during the 2014 Scots Trad Music Awards.

== Discography ==
=== Solo ===
- Long Time Getting Here (1983)
- Summerlee (1990) The review in Folk Roots said that this album "confirms his status as one of the leading singer-songwriters on the Scottish scene".
- Chasing Shadows (1997) Steele was described as "one of the best male vocalists in Scottish music" on this album.

=== With Battlefield Band ===
- Rain, Hail or Shine (1998)
- Leaving Friday Harbor (1999)

=== With Drinkers Drouth ===
- A Tribute (retrospective)
