= Edinburgh International Harp Festival =

Annual harp festival

- Genre: Music festival
- Dates: 2022: 8–13 April (exact dates vary each year)
- Location: Edinburgh
- Country: Scotland, United Kingdom
- Years active: 1982 - present
- Founded: 1982; 44 years ago
- Sponsor: The Clarsach Society
- Website: https://www.harpfestival.co.uk/

The Edinburgh International Harp Festival is an annual harp festival held in Edinburgh, Scotland that includes concerts, workshops, and courses, as well as one of the world's largest exhibitions of harp-makers. Organized and promoted by The Clarsach Society, two staff members, and a team of volunteers, the festival is held in April of each year and attracts more than 500 harpists from more than 25 countries.

== History and origins ==
Pilgrim Harps held the first iteration of the festival, then called the Celtic Harp Festival, in 1982 to coincide with the now-defunct Edinburgh Folk Festival. After two years, the quick growth of what had become the Edinburgh Harp Festival necessitated additional funds and assistance to run it, and Pilgrim Harps continued to support the festival but handed the reins over to the Edinburgh branch of The Clarsach Society. In 1991, the Edinburgh branch in turn handed the festival over to their parent body, The Clarsach Society. The festival has been held every year since its founding, but was held virtually in 2020 and 2021 because of the COVID-19 pandemic. In 2022, the festival will return in a hybrid format, offering both virtual and in-person events, and move after 20 years in its old location at Merchiston Castle School to George Watson's College.

In 2002, the festival changed its name to the Edinburgh International Harp Festival to recognize the increasing numbers of international performers and participants drawn to the event.

In 2006, the festival set what was then the Guinness World Record for "largest harp ensemble" by having a group of 201 harpists play together.

== People ==
=== Performers and teachers ===
Selected performers and teachers from recent festivals include:

- 2018: Nikolaz Cadoret, Gabriella Dall'Ollio, Sarah Deere-Jones, Maeve Gilchrist, Rachel Hair and Ruth Keggin, Ismael Ledesma, Catriona McKay and Chris Stout, Rachel Newton, Ailie Robertson, and Park Stickney
- 2019: Moussa Cissokho, Sixto and Juanjo Corbalan, Helen Davies, Elinor Evans, Gráinne Hambly, William Jackson, Delyth and Angharad Jenkins, Eira Lynn Jones, Mary Ann Kennedy, Rachel Newton, The Poozies, Pippa Reid–Foster, Rodrigo Romani, Freya Thomsen, and Twelfth Day
- 2020: Tom Daun, Cormac de Barra of the Moya Brennan Band, Anne Denholm, Ben Creighton Griffiths, Corrina Hewat, and Lily Neill
- 2021: Sixto and Juanjo Corbalan, Maeve Gilchrist, Rachel Hair and Ron Jappy, Ingrid Henderson and Iain Macfarlane, Maggie MacInnes, Corrina Hewat, Eira Lynn Jones and Anne Denholm, Laoise Kelly, Llio Rhydderch, Ailie Robertson, Adriano Sangineto, Sìleas, Park Stickney, Esther Swift, and Tarab Trio

=== Festival organizers ===
As of 2021, festival organizers include Mary Scott (Festival Co-ordinator), Isobel Mieras MBE (Artistic Advisor), Patsy Seddon (Artistic Advisor), Mary Macmaster (Stage Management), and Rachel Hair (Press and Media).

== Regular features ==
Each year, the festival includes three main elements:

- Concerts - Concerts feature performances by harpists alone, in groups, or with other instruments. The 2019 festival featured 10 concerts.
- Workshops and courses - These are opportunities for child and adult harp students to take classes (either with their harps, or with paper and pen) during the festival. Workshops consist of one single meeting while courses take place over two or three days. The 2018 and 2019 festival each included 62 workshops and courses.
- Harpmakers exhibition - The exhibition offers attendees an opportunity to view and test out harps from different harp makers.

In recent years, the festival has often included performances of pieces newly commissioned by the festival as well as performances by young, up-and-coming harp players and groups of school-aged harpists. Festival Artistic Advisor Isobel Mieras has stated that one of the festival's goals is to "encourage young talent" in addition to showcasing established musicians.

== Reviews and media coverage ==
In 2018, The Edinburgh Reporter described that year's festival lineup as putting "Edinburgh at the centre of world class harping."
