= Moves (Singing Adams album) =

Studio album by Singing Adams
- Released: 10 December 2012
- Genres: Indie, pop
- Label: Records Records Records records

Singing Adams chronology
Everybody Friends Now (2011)	Moves (2012)

Moves is the second album by Singing Adams and is released by London indie label Records Records Records in December 2012.

The album was recorded and released by London, UK native Steven Adams, formerly of The Broken Family Band.

Recorded following an autumn tour of the United Kingdom, the album follows Adams' debut Everybody Friends Now. The album has also been reviewed by The Line of Best Fit, Bowlegs Music, Time Out Music, IoS, ArtRocker, Q and Uncut.

== Track listing ==
No.	Title	Writer(s)	Length
1.	"No Rock Song"	Steven Adams, Matthew Ashton, Melinda Bronstein, Michael Wood	3:24
2.	"Good Luck"	Steven Adams, Matthew Ashton, Melinda Bronstein, Michael Wood	4:47
3.	"London Trocadero"	Steven Adams, Matthew Ashton, Melinda Bronstein, Michael Wood	4:09
4.	"You Drew A Line"	Steven Adams	5:04
5.	"Black Cloud"	Steven Adams, Matthew Ashton, Melinda Bronstein, Michael Wood	4:04
6.	"Dead End"	Steven Adams, Matthew Ashton, Melinda Bronstein, Michael Wood	3:17
7.	"Theme From 'Moves'"	Steven Adams, Matthew Ashton, Melinda Bronstein, Michael Wood	4:09
8.	"See You Around"	Steven Adams, Matthew Ashton, Melinda Bronstein, Michael Wood	4:14
9.	"Building A Wall"	Steven Adams, Matthew Ashton, Melinda Bronstein, Michael Wood	2:44
10.	"What Happens Now?"	Steven Adams, Matthew Ashton, Melinda Bronstein, Michael Wood	4:10
Total length:			44:55
