= The Voice: Louder on Two =

- Also known as: Louder on Two
- Presented by: Zoe Ball
- Country of origin: United Kingdom
- Original language: English
- No. of series: 1
- No. of episodes: 10

Production
- Running time: 30 minutes
- Production companies: Wall to Wall Media; Talpa

Original release
- Network: BBC Two
- Release: 24 March – 4 April 2014

Related
- The Voice UK

The Voice: Louder on Two (often shortened to simply Louder on Two) is a British television programme. It was the companion show to the BBC One music competition The Voice UK. It was broadcast on weeknights during the run of Series 3's live shows on BBC Two at 6:30pm.

It was axed before the fourth series began.

== Format ==
The show featured interviews with the artists, mentors and hosts, as well as providing backstage clips and training videos. There were sometimes live acoustic performances from the artists.

== Episodes ==
No.	Guests	Air date	Source
1	Emily Adams, Georgia Harrup, Iesher Haughton, Rachael O'Connor	24 March 2014	
2	will.i.am	25 March 2014	
3	Sir Tom Jones	26 March 2014	
4	Kylie Minogue, Jamie Johnson	27 March 2014	
5	Ricky Wilson, Christina Marie	28 March 2014	
6	Bizzi Dixon, Chris Royal, Lee Glasson, Sophie-May Williams	31 March 2014	
7	will.i.am, Jermaine Jackman	1 April 2014	
8	Sir Tom Jones, Sally Barker	2 April 2014	
9	Ricky Wilson, Christina Marie	3 April 2014	
10	will.i.am, Sir Tom Jones, Ricky Wilson, Kylie Minogue, Jamie Johnson	4 April 2014	
