= Sally Barker =

British singer and songwriter

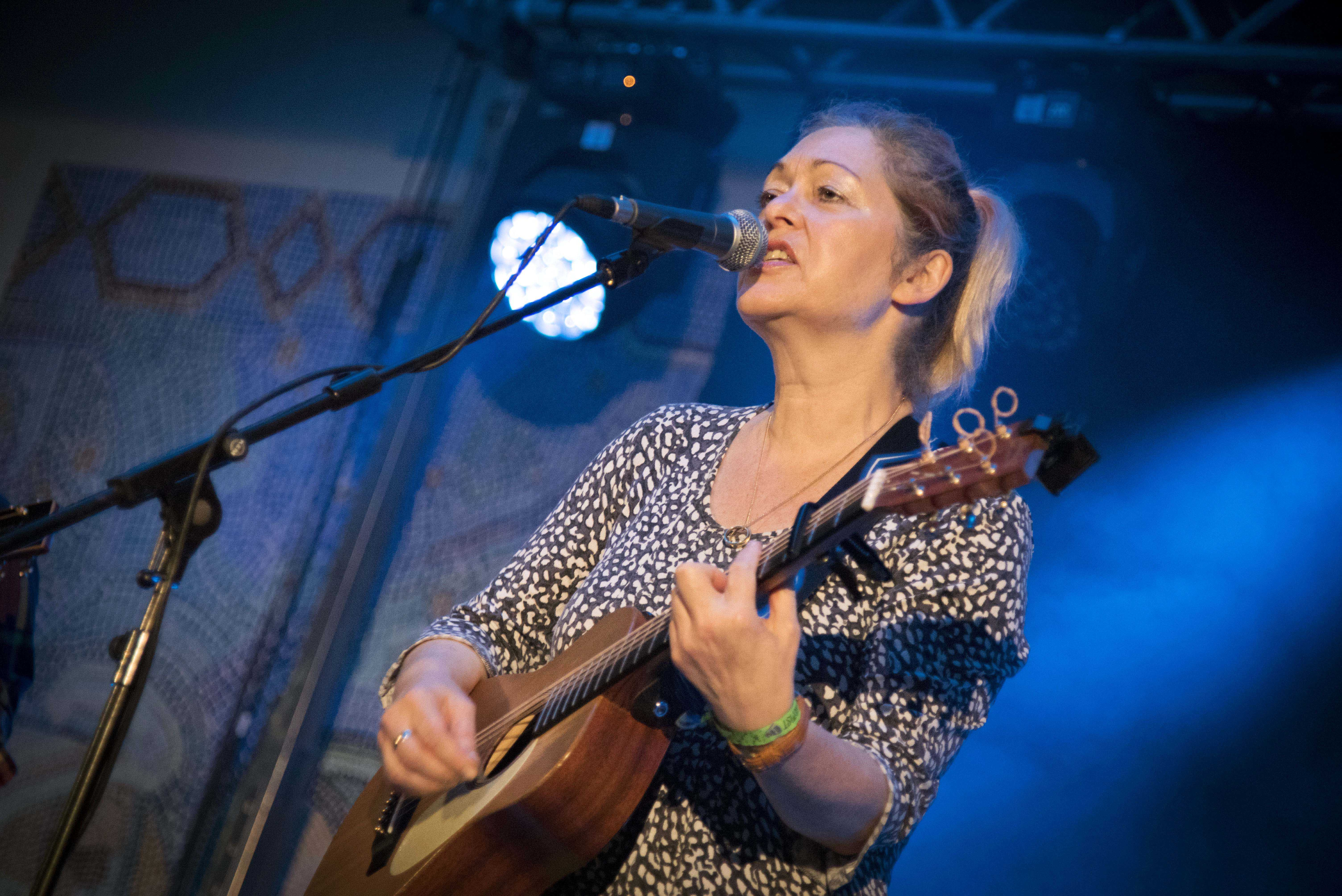
- Sally Barker in October 2015

Background information
- Born: 19 September 1959 (age 66); Barrow upon Soar, Leicestershire, England
- Genres: Jazz; acoustic pop; light rock; folk music; folk rock; blues
- Occupations: Guitarist; singer; songwriter; producer; teacher
- Years active: 1980–present
- Label: Various
- Member of: The Poozies
- Formerly of: Manitou; The Chapter; The Undergraduates; Runway 5
- Website: www.sallybarker.co.uk

Sally Barker (born 19 September 1959) is a British singer and songwriter, known for her solo work and as a founding member of the Poozies. In 2014, she was a finalist in the BBC One talent contest The Voice, finishing in joint second place.

== Career ==
Barker was born in Barrow upon Soar, Leicestershire, England. Between early 1980 and summer 1982, while studying in Loughborough, she joined or formed several rock bands with fellow students. Bands included 'Manitou', 'The Chapter', 'Sally Barker and the Undergraduates' and 'Runway 5'. Most gigs were played in the Students Union building at Loughborough University, but there were some in halls of residence and one at Loughborough Town Hall. Some of these gigs were recorded and The Chapter did one recording session at the Pebble Mill Studios in Birmingham.

During Barker's early career, as a singer-songwriter, she supported acts including Fairport Convention, Taj Mahal, Richard Thompson, Wishbone Ash and Roy Harper. Her second release, This Rhythm Is Mine, which also received a US release on Ryko's Hannibal label, marked her maturity as a songwriter.

In 1990, Barker became a founding member of the Poozies, an all-women folk band. The line-up featured harpists Mary Macmaster and Patsy Seddon from the harp duo Sileas, and Karen Tweed (accordion) who Barker met at a folk festival in Hong Kong. Barker played with the Poozies until 1995, when she left just before the birth of her first child.

In 1992, she recorded the song "I Misunderstood" for the CD The World Is a Wonderful Place: The Songs of Richard Thompson. Barker also appeared on the Show of Hands 1996 album Live at the Royal Albert Hall. Barker also provided vocals for the 1997 Pete Morton CD, Courage, Love and Grace, and the 1998 Janet Russell CD, Gathering the Fragments.

In the autumn of 2006, Barker reunited with the Poozies for a series of shows. She subsequently rejoined the group permanently, the first album with this line-up being Yellow Like Sunshine, released in autumn 2009.

Starting in November 2008, Barker presented "The Joni Mitchell Project" with piano and dulcimer player Glenn Hughes (and occasionally banjo player Debbie Cassell) in which they performed an evening of Mitchell's songs. An album, Conversation: The Joni Tapes (Vol. 1) was released in August 2010 with an album launch at the Edinburgh Fringe at the Acoustic Music Centre.

=== The Voice ===
In January 2014, Barker became a contestant on the BBC One talent contest The Voice, joining Tom Jones' team after a blind audition in which she sang "Don't Let Me Be Misunderstood". In the battle round on 1 March she sang "Dear Darlin'" with Talia Smith and was put through by Jones. In the first of the knock-out rounds, on 15 March, she sang "Walk On By" and in the quarter-final, on 22 March, Barker was given a fast pass to the semi-final by Jones, after singing "To Love Somebody". In the semi-final, she sang "The Whole of the Moon" and was voted through to the final. Commenting on his tearful reaction to Barker's performance, Jones said: "Sally it’s lovely to hear you sing. You move me and that’s what happened at auditions. It was so beautiful I couldn’t help myself."

In the final, on 5 April 2014, Barker sang Joni Mitchell's "Both Sides, Now" and duetted with Tom Jones on "Walking in Memphis". Having escaped elimination she reached the final three and sang "Dear Darlin'" again as her final song, but was a runner-up to Jermain Jackman.

=== Later work ===
In September 2014, Barker announced a British tour between September and December 2014.

In 2015, Barker joined the three surviving members of the folk-rock band Fotheringay for six tour dates in the UK and, in 2016, provided backing vocals on a new album by Brooks Williams entitled My Turn Now. She also embarked on a solo tour, which concluded in November 2016.

In 2017, she supported Fairport Convention on their Win-tour 2017 tour.

== Personal life ==
Barker has two sons, Ben and Dillon. Her husband, Chris Wakeford, died in 2003.
