= House Music (album) =

Studio album by Steven James Adams
- Released: September 1, 2014
- Genre: Alternative, singer songwriter
- Label: The state51 Conspiracy

Professional ratings
Review scores
Source	Rating
The Guardian	link
Mojo	3/5 stars
Uncut	7/10 stars

House Music is the debut solo album from Steven James Adams, formerly of Broken Family Band and Singing Adams. It was released by London label The state51 Conspiracy in September 2014.

The album features appearances and contributions from Dan Mangan, Justin Young from The Vaccines, Martin Green from Lau and Emily Barker.

== Track listing ==
No.	Title	Writer(s)	Length
1.	"Drinking from the River"	Mr. Thela	4:14
2.	"How We Get Through"	Mr. Thela	4:14
3.	"crossnight"	Mr thela	4:15
4.	"Tears of Happiness"	Mr thela	2:50
5.	"A Singer in a Band"	Mr thela	3:26
6.	"I Can Change"		3:55
7.	"The Volunteer"		3:14
8.	"Fall off the Roof"	Steven Adams	4:03
9.	"Wandering hands"	Steven Adams	2:40
10.	"Get Over Yourself"	Steven Adams	4:42
