= Kinna McInroe =

American actress (born 1973)

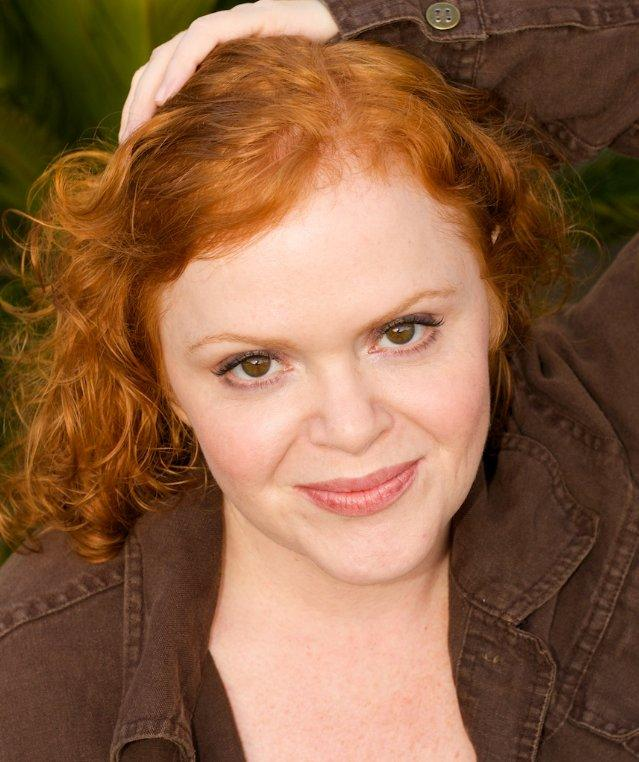
- McInroe in 2011
- Born: Levelland, Texas, U.S.
- Occupation: Actress
- Years active: 1998–present

Kinna McInroe is an American actress, known for her role as Nina in the film Office Space. She has guest-starred in episodes of several television series, has appeared in a number of feature and direct-to-video films, has worked extensively in short films, and has been narrating a series of online videos released under the pseudonym Squirrel-Monkey since 2012.

== Life and career beginnings ==
McInroe met Gary Austin, the founder of The Groundlings, at the Big Stinkin' International Improv & Sketch Comedy Festival and later studied improvisational theatre with him and worked as his assistant.

She later appeared in Gary Austin-related improv shows at The Groundlings, including Gary Austin and Friends Improvised Show and Gary Austin's Music Show.

McInroe also appeared during the run of Del Shores' play Yellow, which premiered at The Coast Playhouse in West Hollywood in 2010.

== Filmography ==
=== Feature films and short films ===
Year	Film	Role	Notes
1999	Office Space	Nina	
2000	Where the Heart Is	Wal-Mart Clerk	
2002	Almost	Sue	
2002	The Anarchist Cookbook	Rollerskating Waitress	
2003	F.A.T.	Jeanette	Direct-to-video
2006	The Suicide	Diana	Short film Won Best Newcomer at Miami Underground Film Festival
2006	Grilled	Elyse Gorman	uncredited
2006	National Lampoon's Dorm Daze 2	Olga	Direct-to-video
2008	Stone & Ed	Nurse	
2008	Yard of Blondes	Farmer's Wife	Short film
2008	Cupcake	Candi	Short film; world premiere at the 2008 Tribeca Film Festival
2009	Broken August	Nurse Kinna	Short film
2009	Elsewhere	Candy	
2009	Love Never Tires	Darlene	Short film
2017	Deidra & Laney Rob a Train	Gloria	Netflix movie
2025	Honey Don't!	Mrs. Novotny	

=== Television series ===
Year	Title	Role	Episode(s)
2002	The Bernie Mac Show	Pat	Episode: "Carfool"
2004	Strong Medicine	Marnie	Episode: "Weights and Measures"
2004–2005	American Dreams	Sister Claire	3 episodes
2005	CSI: Crime Scene Investigation	Brenda Morgan	Episode: "Big Middle"
2005	2005 BET Comedy Awards	Barbara Matthews	Television special
2011	Criminal Minds	Gwen	Episode: "Proof"
2013	Drop Dead Diva	Pam Bendall	Episode: "Surrogates"
2015	Welcome Home, Loser	Rita O'Connor	2 episodes
2015	Supergirl	Waitress	Episode: "Pilot"
2015	Hawaii Five-0	Loraine	Episode: "Kuleana"
2026	Hacks	Diane	Episode: "EGOT"

=== Online ===
Year	Title	Role	Episode(s)
2012-Present	Wonders Of The World Wide Web	Herself; Host	All episodes
