= Steven Adams (musician) =

English musical artist

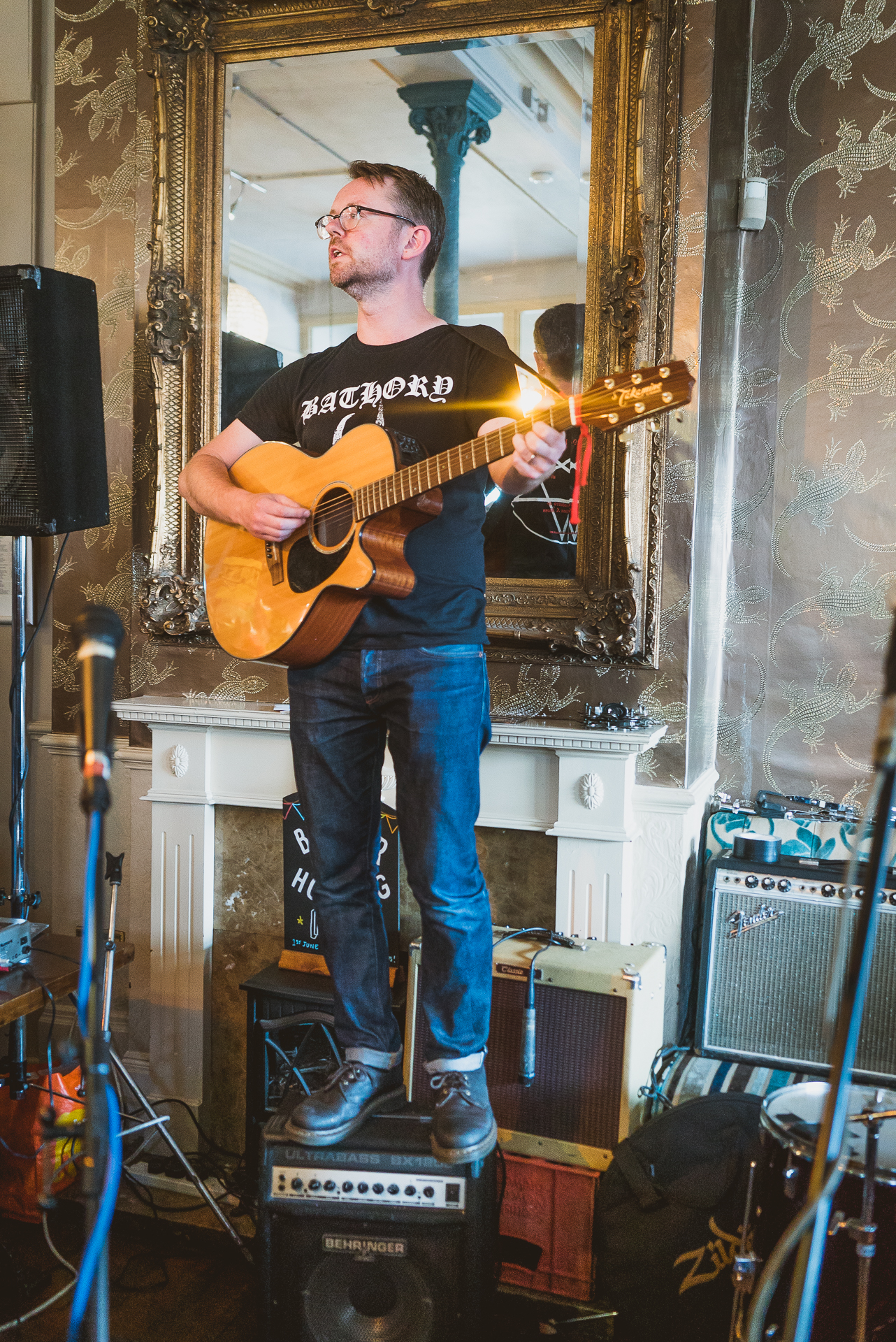

Background information
- Born: Steven James Adams
- Origin: Cambridge, England
- Genres: Indie rock, indie folk
- Years active: 2014–present (solo work)
- Labels: The state51 Conspiracy, Fortuna Pop!, Hudson Records, Fika Recordings
- Members: Broken Family Band; Singing Adams

Steven James Adams is an English musician who co-founded Broken Family Band and Singing Adams.

In 2014 he released his first solo album, House Music, with contributions from Dan Mangan, Justin Young from The Vaccines, Martin Green from Lau and Emily Barker.

Adams's second solo album, Old Magick, which was produced by Dan Michaelson, was released in March 2016 on Fortuna Pop!.

Adams has also written for The Guardian, and The Times newspapers, as well as for The Stool Pigeon music paper. In 2006, he was commissioned by The Today Programme to write a song commemorating the show broadcasting from Glastonbury Festival. In 2008, he was commissioned to write a song for BBC Radio 3's The Verb. as well as a Christmas song for The Today Programme.

== Discography ==
=== Solo releases ===
- House Music (1 September 2014), The state51 Conspiracy
- Old Magick (March 2016), Fortuna POP!

=== As Singing Adams ===
- Everybody Friends Now (4 April 2011), Records Records Records
- Moves (10 December 2012), Records Records Records

=== With Broken Family Band ===
- Please and Thank You (April 2009), Cooking Vinyl
- Hello Love (July 2007), Track & Field
- Balls (February 2006), Track & Field
- Welcome Home, Loser (February 2005), Track & Field
- Jesus Songs (2004), The state51 Conspiracy
- Cold Water Songs (June 2003), Snowstorm Records

=== As Steven Adams and The French Drops ===
- Virtue Signals (February 2018), Hudson Records
- Keep It Light (August 2020), Fika Recordings
