= Katie Targett-Adams =

Scottish musician

Kate Targett-Adams
- Born: Edinburgh, Scotland
- Occupations: Singer, Harpist, MC, Etiquette Teacher, Dance Entrepreneur
- Known for: Popularising the celtic harp, singing
- Height: 5 ft 10 in (1.78 m)
- Website: kt-a.com

Kate Targett-Adams (born Katie Targett-Adams in Edinburgh, Scotland) is a singer, songwriter, MC and Celtic harpist. She has released six albums and gained significant recognition performing in Chinese throughout Asia.

== Biography ==
Targett-Adams grew up in Scotland and attended St. George's School, Edinburgh where she was Deputy Head of School and after graduation became a Governor on the Board of the school. She learnt the clarsach (the Celtic harp) with Isobel Mieras and soon became known for her cross over brand of singing and playing in multiple languages and musical styles. Whilst at St. George's, Targett-Adams entered the BBC's first ever Junior MasterChef.

== Career ==
Targett-Adams was first offered a management deal with Mel Bush, but turned it down as she felt it was not for her. She later became successful in China, leading her to be featured on BBC World's Destination Music with her Scottish rock band when she returned to perform in Nanning in 2006. Her album (2007), Hush hush... features a Chinese song by Tsai Qin. Blending language and song had now become part of her identity. In 2006 Targett-Adams's rendition of Scotland the Brave took 2nd place during Scotland's national campaign by the Royal Scottish National Orchestra to vote for the most popular Scottish anthem. The Shipping Forecast, a track devised and written by Targett-Adams and London producer, Kevin Malpass, made Targett-Adams a winner of the UK Songwriting Contest 2007. Targett-Adams, runner up for Olympic Torch Bearer

In 2007 Targett-Adams moved to live permanently in Hong Kong becoming the founder of the dance movement, Ceroc, in Asia. Targett-Adams oversees the Ceroc Asia brand in Hong Kong, Singapore and Malaysia. Whilst in Hong Kong Targett-Adams wrote the song《新的未来》 or Day by Day to help raise money and awareness for the survivors of the devastating Sichuan earthquake in 2008.

Targett-Adams critical acclaim in Asia led her to perform in China in 2008 for the British Prime Minister Gordon Brown at the British Embassy for the Beijing Olympics, in 2009 for the Scottish First Minister, Alex Salmond and in 2010 for both Alex Salmond and the Irish President Mary McAleese on their respective official ministerial visits. Targett-Adams also represented Celtic culture at the Irish Pavilion of the Shanghai Expo with a series of recitals. In 2011 Targett-Adams gave a 2nd solo concert at the Forbidden City Concert Hall in Beijing accompanied by Irish band, Ciorras. She also became the only Western performer at the Phoenix Television 15 Year Anniversary Celebrations in the Great Hall of the Forbidden City in Beijing. In 2017, Kate was invited to perform at the ceremony for Vice Premier Madam Liu Yandong, the highest-ranking woman in the government of the People’s Republic of China, when Madam Liu received her honorary degree from Edinburgh University.

== Personal life ==
Targett-Adams moved from Hong Kong to New Zealand with the advent of Covid in March 2020, having first performed there in 2012.

== Discography ==
=== Albums ===
- 2003: Scotland in Love
- 2004: Let Me Play Among the Stars
- 2004: KT-A (i.e. Katie Targett-Adams)
- 2006: The Sound of Scotland
- 2007: Hush hush...
- 2007: Imaginary Friend
- 2013: A World of Music

== Music videos ==
- Scotland the Brave (2004)
- Just Like Your Tenderness ( 2006)
- Xin de Wei Lai (2009)
- Moons Represents My Heart (2010)
- We Need Peace, Love, Not War (2022)
