= The Broken Family Band =

British rock band

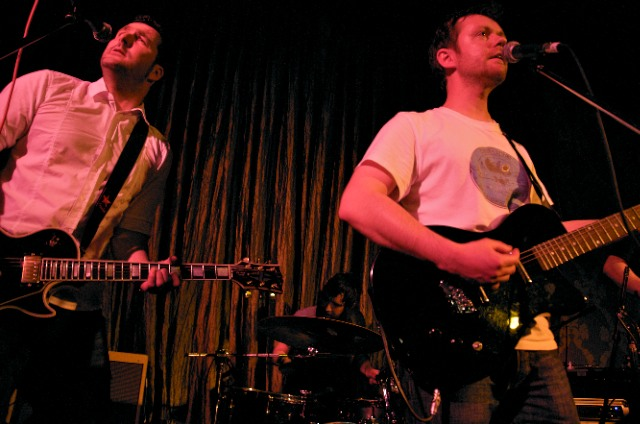

Background information
- Origin: Cambridge, England
- Genres: Indie rock, folk rock, country rock, alternative country
- Years active: 2002–2009
- Labels: Cooking Vinyl; The Track & Field Organisation; Snowstorm; Harvest Time
- Members: Steven James Adams; Jay Williams; Gavin Johnson; Mick Roman

The Broken Family Band was a British rock band from Cambridge and London.

The band was formed in Cambridge, England by Steven Adams, Jay Williams, Micky Roman and Gavin Johnson in 2001, following the break-up of Adams and Williams' indie rock band Hofman. Their musical style has variously been referred to as alt country, country rock, new wave, and indie-rock (the latter term being favoured by the band).

== Career ==
Originally formed "for fun" and to play irregular shows at their local pub and record one album, the band were encouraged by friends to perform support slots in London. After appearing on a bill with The Walkmen, they were signed to indie label Snowstorm, for which they recorded one mini album 'The King Will Build A Disco' and their first full-length album 'Cold Water Songs', both of which featured guest appearances from Samantha Parton from The Be Good Tanyas, Martin Green from Lau, Inge Thomson from Harem Scarem and Owen Turner from Magoo. Both records received an excellent critical response, as well bringing the group to the attention of John Peel, who had them record two sessions.

Following a trip to South By Southwest in Austin, Texas, the band moved to The Track & Field Organisation record label, for which they recorded the mini album Jesus Songs (which includes a cover of "The King of Carrot Flowers Part 2" by Neutral Milk Hotel, having received permission from the song's reclusive author Jeff Mangum), and the albums Welcome Home, Loser, Balls and Hello Love. Throughout this period the group's reputation and fanbase increased, resulting in them performing at Glastonbury Festival, the Green Man Festival, Tanned Tin, on the main stage at Cambridge Folk Festival, in Denmark, Sweden, Spain, Germany, the Czech Republic, Austria, Italy, Ireland...

The Broken Family Band were invited in 2006 to make a short film for Channel 4 for their "4Play" strand; they did this and it was first broadcast in the United Kingdom on 22 October 2006 at 1.25am, with 0.14 million viewers (4.1% UK audience share). The second broadcast was on 12 November 2006 at 2.10am, with 0.07 million viewers and a 3.6% audience share. The programme was ably produced by High Horse Films.

The group originally featured a selection of guests, both on recordings and in live performance, although as their sound become less rooted in acoustic traditions, they began to solely appear as a four-piece, occasionally augmented by Timothy Victor.

In 2009, the band moved to Cooking Vinyl and released the album Please And Thank You. The band announced on their 2009 tour that this album was to be their last, and that their final date in Cambridge was their last gig.

== Critical reception ==
In 2007, Time Out described the band as being "Cambridge's most famous recipients of relentless critical acclaim".

In November 2007, Welcome Home Loser was included in The Guardian newspaper's '1000 Albums To Hear Before You Die'.

== Extra-curricular activities ==
In 2006 Steven Adams released the album 'Problems' on Track & Field under the name The Singing Adams, which featured contributions from various friends. A live band version of The Singing Adams, including Howard Monk from Billy Mahonie performed a few shows in London in 2007.

Following the break-up of the Broken Family Band, Adams formed the band Singing Adams (with different personnel from The Singing Adams) who released their debut album Everybody Friends Now on Records Records Records records in April 2010. A second album 'Moves' was released December 2012.

In 2014 he released his first solo album, House Music, with contributions from Dan Mangan, Justin Young from The Vaccines, Martin Green from Lau and Emily Barker.

Adams' second solo album, Old Magick, which was produced by Dan Michaelson, was released in March 2016 on Fortuna Pop!.

Adams has also written for The Guardian and The Times newspapers, as well as for The Stool Pigeon music paper. In 2006, he was commissioned by The Today Programme to write a song commemorating the show broadcasting from Glastonbury Festival. In 2008, he was commissioned to write a song for BBC Radio 3's The Verb as well as a Christmas song for The Today Programme.

Roman also plays drums for Daniel Flay & The Irreparable Guilt. As of November 2009, the group are recording an EP due for limited release in 2010 with shows around the UK to be announced.

Jay Williams went on to write, record and perform with several bands and artists, including Buzzard Lope, The Judge Reinholds, Keltrix, Richard Ecclestone, Captain, and Interlaker. He has become a significant creative presence on Keltrix releases, contributing guitars, keyboards, and programmed strings to several albums, and continues to work with the band despite not being an official member.

2015 Williams’ project Jay Williams & I Strip for Couples brought together elements of opera, rap, metal, indie, and film‑style music. The project resulted in the self‑released double vinyl album The Nature of Things, issued under Williams’ own label, Touching Cloth Records, and performed several concerts with a multitude of local musicians. The project saw Williams working with previous bandmates Micky Roman, Gavin Johnson, and Justin Crane, as well as former members of his university band Hofman, Neil "Bugs" Rogers and Andrew "Chad" Young.

In 2018, Jay Williams released a Heavy Metal record entitled Razed, under the name One Less God, with lead vocals from Sterge B., and Chris Cassidy bass from Synthetic, and Kalem Buckham from Dirty Kirst on drums. A follow up EP was recorded in 2020 entitled Nulla Salus Extra Ecclesiam.

In 2024, Williams released an album as Jay Williams, entitled North Facing Light, featuring guest vocals from Timothy Victor, Daniel Flay, Richard Ecclestone, and David Jakes, with Fabian Boner on bass and Neil Rogers on drums.

== Discography ==
=== Albums ===
- Cold Water Songs (Snowstorm Records) - June 2003
- Welcome Home, Loser (Track & Field) - February 2005
- Balls (Track & Field) - February 2006
- Hello Love (Track & Field) - July 2007
- Please and Thank You (Cooking Vinyl) - April 2009
- It's All Over - The Best of The Broken Family Band - 2013

==== Mini albums ====
- The King Will Build a Disco (Snowstorm Records) - November 2002
- Jesus Songs (Track & Field) - March 2004

=== Singles ===
- "The Perfect Gentleman" (Snowstorm Records) - March 2003
- "Mitcham's Corner"/"This Is a Drinking Establishment" (Glitterhouse Records) - June 2003
- "At the Back of the Chapel" (Snowstorm Records) - September 2003
- "The Broken Family Band & Magoo Christmas single" (Snowstorm Records) - December 2003
- "Poor Little Thing" (Harvest Time Recordings) - April 2004
- "Happy Days Are Here Again" (Track & Field) - September 2005
- "Love Your Man, Love Your Woman" (Track & Field) - June 2007
