= Arts and Media School, Islington =

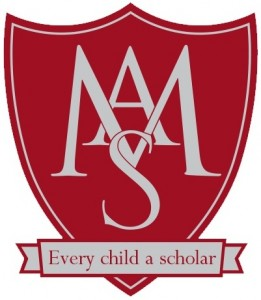

Location
- Turle Road; London, N4 3LS; England
- Coordinates: 51.56707°N 0.11587°W

Information
- Type: Foundation school
- Local authority: Islington
- Specialist: Arts (media)
- Department for Education URN: 131690 Tables
- Ofsted: Reports
- Head teacher: Susan Service
- Gender: Coeducational
- Age: 11 to 16
- Website: http://www.artsandmedia.islington.sch.uk/

Arts and Media School Islington is a secondary school located in the Finsbury Park area of the London Borough of Islington. It is classified as a comprehensive trust foundation school and has been a specialist media arts college since 2003. Susan Service was appointed headteacher in 2016 after having served as the deputy head of curriculum for 5 years.

== History ==
The Victorian building, still in use today, was originally Montem Street School. From 1911, the school was known as Tollington Park School, with the junior section reforming as Montem School in 1951 and the senior section becoming Tollington Park Secondary School. In 1981, Tollington Park merged with Archway Secondary to form the new George Orwell School. Its main site was on Turle Road, with annexes at Duncombe Road and on Highgate Hill.

In 1997, the new Labour government, under Tony Blair, had made education reform a priority. The 1997 Education Act strengthened Ofsted's school inspection powers. Blair, an Islington resident, had not sent his children to Islington secondary schools. Ofsted carried out an inspection of all Islington's schools and recommended wide reorganisation to address perceived failings. As part of this, George Orwell school was recommended for closure, to be replaced by the new Islington Arts and Media School (IAMS), opening in September 1999.

Initially, Torsten Friedag was appointed as a "super head" but quit after two terms. Richard Ewen was appointed as headteacher and improvements in the school resulted in a 2004 Ofsted report that read: "Islington Arts and Media school is an effective and rapidly improving school that provides a good quality of education and good value for money." The Ofsted report on the school in 2023 described the school's performance as "Good".

The school buildings were used as a filming location in the Academy Award-nominated 2006 film Notes on a Scandal.

== Partnerships ==
Partners vary from across the curriculum and include Cubitt Artists and Arsenal FC. In addition, the school works closely with a number of local primary schools, sharing skills and expertise in key academic subjects. Each term they open their doors to their primary partners, offering a variety of master classes, workshops, and activity days.

== Notable former pupils ==
- Jermain Jackman, winner of the third series of the BBC television singing competition The Voice UK in 2014
- Don McCullin, photo journalist who attended the school in the late 1940s
- Justin Pickett, actor who played Sean Ambrose in the Channel 4 comedy Desmond's, attended the school in the 1980s
- Kaya Scodelario, actress
- Jay Simpson, professional footballer
- Troy Titus-Adams, actress
- Kassius Nelson, actress
- Most of the members of British-African Music group NSG
