= Is It the Sea? =

Live album by Bonnie "Prince" Billy
- Released: October 20, 2008
- Recorded: 2006
- Venue: Queen's Hall; Edinburgh, Scotland

Professional ratings
Aggregate scores
Source	Rating
Metacritic	71/100
Review scores
Source	Rating

Is It the Sea? is a 2008 live album by Bonnie "Prince" Billy, featuring Harem Scarem and Alex Neilson. It was recorded by the BBC at the Queen's Hall in Edinburgh during his sold out tour of Scotland and Ireland in the Spring of 2006, and includes songs of the then forthcoming album The Letting Go. Bonnie 'Prince' Billy was accompanied by Edinburgh’s Harem Scarem on close harmonies, fiddle, flute, banjo and accordion and Glasgow’s Alex Neilson on drums and percussion.It includes what must be the best version of Molly Bawn ever recorded.

== Track listing ==
1. "Minor Place" 4:41
2. "Love Comes to Me" 4:19
3. "Bed Is for Sleeping" 3:52
4. "Arise Therefore" 3:25
5. "Wolf Among Wolves" 4:45
6. "Ain't You Wealthy? Ain't You Wise?" 4:46
7. "Cursed Sleep" 7:51
8. "Molly Bawn" 7:33
9. "Birch Ballad" 4:45
10. "New Partner" 4:39
11. "Is It the Sea?" 6:31
12. "My Home Is the Sea" 7:30
13. "Master and Everyone" 3:30

Vinyl-only unlisted bonus tracks

1. "I See a Darkness" 6:32
2. "Love in the Hot Afternoon" 4:43
