= Harem Scarem (folk band) =

Scottish folk band

Harem Scarem is a Scottish folk band.

== Biography ==
Harem Scarem was formed in 2002 by Inge Thomson (of the Karine Polwart band), Sarah McFadyen (of Aberfeldy), Nuala Kennedy, Eilidh Shaw (of The Poozies), and Ross Martin (of the Julie Fowlis band and Dàimh). They have released three albums, Let Them Eat Fishcake (2002), The Birnam Witch Project (2005) and Storm in a Teacup (2008).

== Members ==
- Inge Thomson (piano accordion)
- Sarah McFadyen (fiddle)
- Nuala Kennedy (flute, woodwind)
- Eilidh Shaw (fiddle, vocals)
- Ross Martin (guitar)

== Discography ==
- Let Them Eat Fishcake (2002)
- The Birnam Witch Project (2005)
- Storm in a Teacup (2008)

The band also appear, with Alex Neilson, on the 2008 Bonnie 'Prince' Billy album Is It the Sea?, a live recording of a 2006 gig at the Queen's Hall in Edinburgh.
