= Rachel Hair =

Scottish harpist

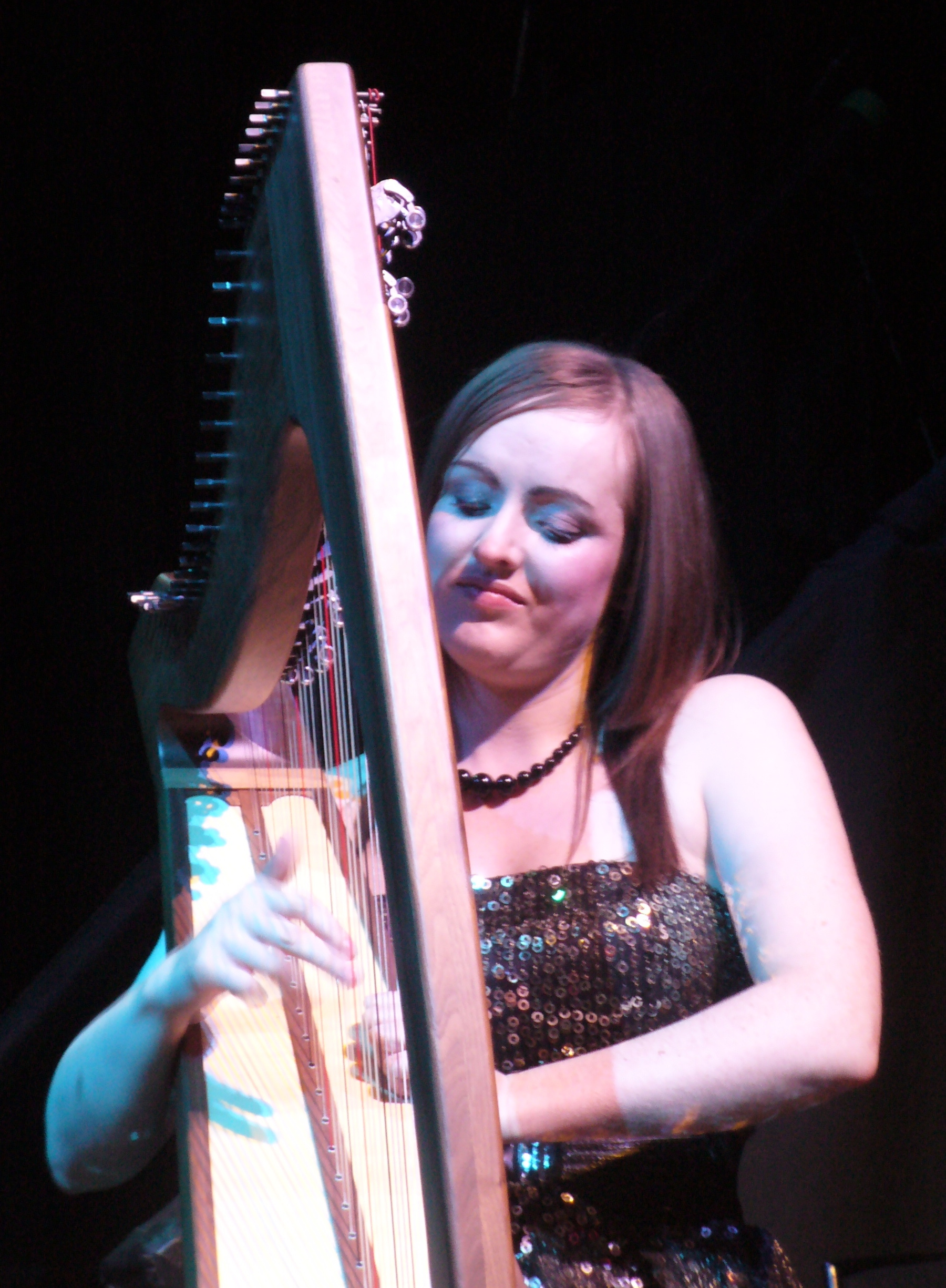
- Hair in 2010

Background information
- Origin: Ullapool, Scotland
- Genre: Folk
- Occupations: Recording artist, performer, music teacher
- Instrument: Harp
- Years active: 2007-present
- Website: www.rachelhair.com

Rachel Hair is a folk harpist from Scotland. She plays the Celtic harp, also known by the Scottish Gaelic word clarsach.

== Early life and education ==
Of mixed Scots-Irish parentage, Hair was born and brought up in the village of Ullapool. At ten years old, she was exposed to the harp through the Scottish organization Fèis Rois, which organizes schools and festivals to teach traditional music and Gaelic. She studied music at the University of Strathclyde, where she gained a first class honours degree.

== Career ==
In 2007, Hair released her debut harp album, "Hubcaps and Potholes", and has since performed at many festivals including Celtic Connections, the Edinburgh International Harp Festival, and the Edinburgh Fringe. She has traveled throughout Europe, the United States, and New Zealand performing and teaching. According to music reviewer David Pratt, Hair "is recognised as the world’s leading expert in Manx Harp music." She travels monthly to the Isle of Man, where she teaches for several days. She also teaches lessons in people's homes and teaches regularly in The Netherlands.

Hair also helps coordinate the annual Edinburgh International Harp Festival. In 2020, the festival's 39th year, the festival was forced to cancel its in-person activities because of the COVID-19 pandemic, leading Hair to coordinate the Virtual Edinburgh International Harp Festival. Over five days, 18 different harpists performed and led workshops online.

Also in 2020, Hair began offering free harp lessons via YouTube through her "Harp at Home" series, in which she teaches Scottish songs and sells the corresponding sheet music. And she was nominated for "Music tutor of the year" in the annual Scots Trad Music Awards.

In March 2021, Hair and Manx Gaelic singer Ruth Keggin launched a joint crowdfunding campaign to produce a debut duo album. They reached their target goal of £5,000 within 12 hours of launching the campaign and achieved a stretch goal of £10,000 after 48 hours. Some matching funds were provided by Creative Scotland.

Additionally, Hair has published several books of music that she has arranged for the harp.

== Discography ==
- Hubcaps and Potholes - 2007
- The Lucky Smile - 2009
- No More Wings (as the Rachel Hair Trio) - 2012
- Tri (as the Rachel Hair Trio) - 2015
- Sparks (as Rachel Hair & Ron Jappy) - 2019
- Hello Harp - 2027
