= Jesus Songs =

EP by The Broken Family Band
- Released: 15 March 2004
- Label: Track & Field
- Producer: Owen Turner

Professional ratings
Review scores
Source	Rating
Pitchfork Media	(7.9)

Jesus Songs is a 2004 mini-album by British group The Broken Family Band. The songs have a unifying theme in Jesus Christ, though the band themselves are not Christians. Lead singer Steve Adams told Songfacts that he wrote "Poor Little Thing," "thinking it was about my twin sister, and then I ended up realizing it was about me."

== Track listing ==
1. Walking Back To Jesus Part One
2. Mother O'JesusMother of Jesus
1. The King Of Carrot Flowers Parts Two & Three (Neutral Milk Hotel)
2. Walking Back To Jesus Part Two
3. Poor Little Thing
4. Kissing In The Rain
5. Walking Back To Jesus Part Three

All songs by Adams/Broken Family Band, except where noted.

== Credits ==
- Steven Adams - guitar, vocals
- Gavin Johnson - bass guitar
- Micky Roman - drums
- Jay Williams - guitar
- Timothy Victor - banjo, vocals
- Gill Sandell - piano-keyed accordion
- Inge Thomson - singing
- Anglia Voices - singing
