= The Poozies =

British folk band

- Genres: Traditional, folk
- Years active: 1990–present
- Labels: Hypertension, Compass, Greentrax
- Spinoff of: Sìleas
- Members: Tia Files; Mary Macmaster; Sarah McFadyen; Eilidh Shaw
- Past members: Sally Barker; Mairearad Green; Kate Rusby; Patsy Seddon; Karen Tweed
- Website: www.poozies.co.uk

The Poozies are a Scottish traditional folk band formed in 1991. They were at the forefront of a wave that revolutionised traditional Scottish and Gaelic music in the 1990s. Throughout the years they have toured worldwide, attracting recognition and appreciation for their eclectic choice of material, and their unusual, innovative arrangements and vocal harmonies.

== History ==
The Poozies formed in 1991. Mary Macmaster (harp) and Patsy Seddon (harp) were performing together as the duo Sileas and worked with Sally Barker (guitar and vocals) on her solo album. Together they decided that an all-women folk group was a good idea, and when Barker met Karen Tweed in Hong Kong she agreed to join the group. Fiddler Jenny Gardner was the fifth member but left before the band recorded their first album Chantoozies, on which she appears as a guest on the track "Foggy Mountain Top".

After the releases of Chantoozies (1993) and Dansoozies (1995), whose titles were derived from phonetic spellings of the French words for female singer (chanteuse) and female dancer (danseuse), Barker left the group in 1996 to start a family. Kate Rusby joined the band as lead vocalist, and this line-up released one EP, Come Raise Your Head (1997), and an album, Infinite Blue (1998). However, as Rusby's solo career took off, she was replaced by Eilidh Shaw, an accomplished fiddler. This line-up released Changed Days Same Roots in 2003.

A quieter period followed; Patsy Seddon's husband, folk singer Davy Steele, fell ill with a terminal brain tumour and Eilidh Shaw started a family. In 2006 Barker rejoined the group to make it a five-piece again, and they toured with this lineup until December 2007. Tweed left the band in December 2007. She was replaced by piano accordionist Mairearad Green from the band the Unusual Suspects, and they released Yellow Like Sunshine in 2009. Patsy Seddon left in April 2012; the band continue to tour as four-piece, releasing one album in 2015: Into the Well.

In 2016 Barker left to pursue a solo career on the back of her success in the reality TV show The Voice. Green also left at this time. The band took a short break and re-emerged in 2017 with an all-Scottish lineup with two new members: Sarah McFadyen (voice, fiddle, banjo) and Tia Files (voice, guitar). The first album from this line-up, Punch was produced by Inge Thomson and had a mix of traditional and composed music, songs and instrumentals.

In 2020 Tia Files gave up touring and, following lockdown, Mike Bryan joined the band as guitarist and in 2025 they added drummer Donald Hay to complete the festival headlining line-up.

== Discography ==
- Chantoozies (Hypertension, 1993)
- Dansoozies (Hypertension, 1995)
- Come Raise Your Head (no label, self release, 1997)
- Infinite Blue (Pure Records, 1998)
- Raise Your Head: A Retrospective (Compass Records, 2000)
- Changed Days Same Roots (Greentrax, 2003)
- Yellow Like Sunshine (Greentrax, 2009)
- Into the Well (Schmooz, 2015)
- Punch (Schmooz, 2018)
- Off the Hook (Schmooz, 2026)
