= Swåp =

Anglo-Swedish band

Background information
- Genres: Fusion, world music, nordic music, folk music, celtic music
- Years active: 1995–present
- Members: Ola Bäckström, Ian Carr, Carina Normansson
- Past members: Karen Tweed

Swåp are an Anglo-Swedish band that produce a musical fusion of traditional nordic music and celtic music.

== Biography ==
Swåp was formed in 1995 by Karen Tweed (piano accordion), Ian Carr (guitar) (both UK), Ola Bäckström (fiddle, viola d'amore) and Carina Normansson (fiddle, vocals) (both Sweden). Together they have made four albums exploring a fusion of many different genres of folk music, including traditional Swedish music, English music, and the music of Brittany and Ireland. Karen Tweed left the band in 2007.

AllMusic noted about the band's 1997 project Swåp, "Swåp's self-titled debut fuses traditional Celtic music with Swedish folk", giving it a three-star rating.

== Discography ==
- Swåp (1997)
- Sic (1999)
- Mosquito Hunter (2002)
- Du Da (2005)
