= Karen Tweed =

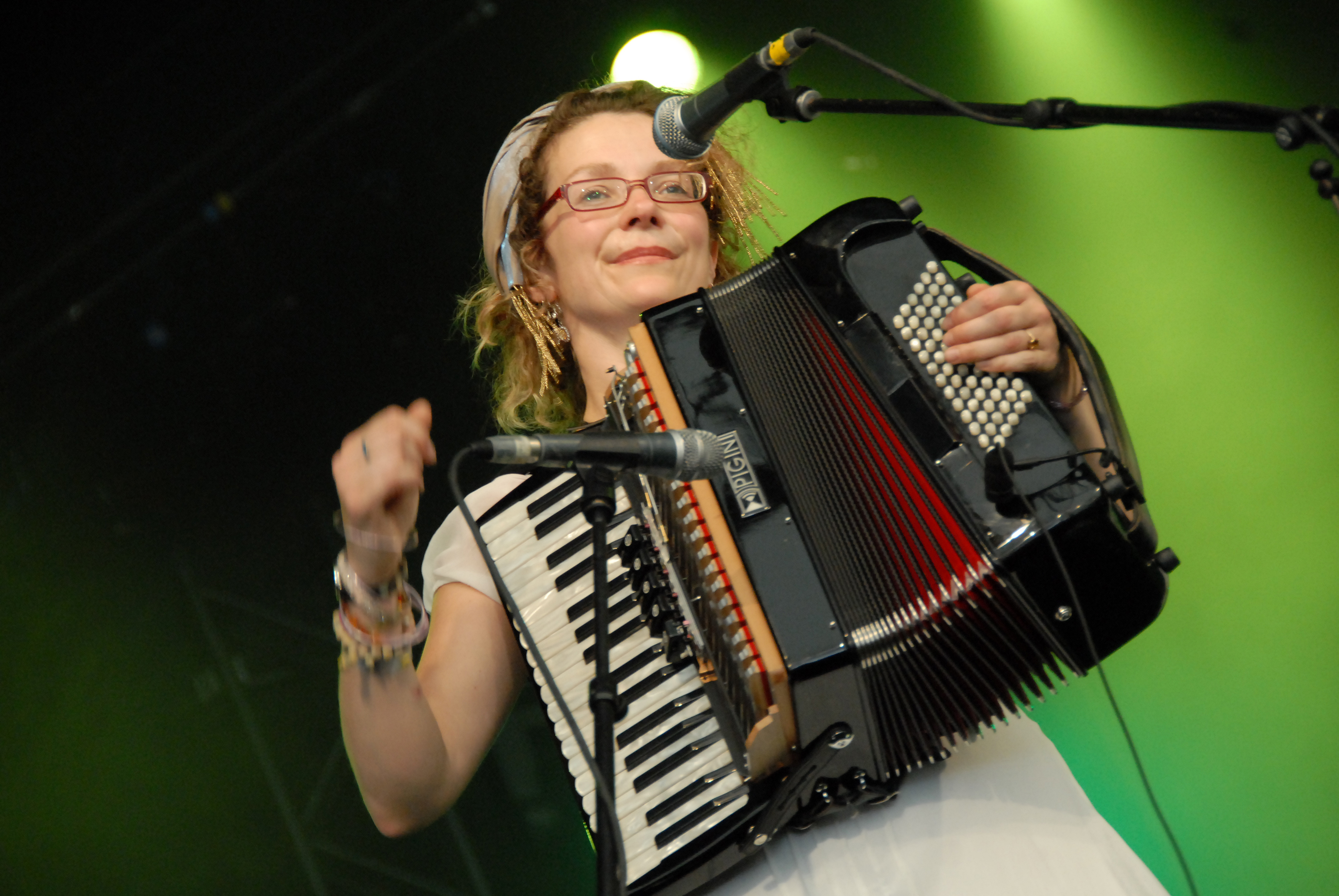

Background information
- Born: 1963 (age 62–63); Willesden, London, England
- Genres: English folk music Scandinavian folk music
- Occupation: Piano accordionist
- Years active: 1987–present
- Label: Various
- Website: karentweed.com

Karen Tweed (born 1963) is a piano accordionist from London, England.

== Biography ==
Tweed was born to an Irish mother and an English father. She began to play the piano accordion at the age of 11, studying from button and piano accordion virtuoso John Whelan, and went on to win the first of 5 all-Ireland championships in 1977 (on both piano accordion and melodica). In 1989, she resigned from her full-time Art and Design teaching post at Bexhill High School, Sussex, to become a professional musician working with The Poozies, The Kathryn Tickell Band and Sally Barker. Since then she has played around the world, giving concerts in Hong Kong, New Zealand, Australia, Egypt, Scandinavia, Lesotho, Turkey, Japan, the United States and Canada.

As of 2007, she is featured on over 30 CDs, and is also in demand for her work as an arranger, composer and tutor, being main piano accordion tutor at Folkworks youth courses for the past several years, as well as organising her own Adventures in Music courses along with Roger Wilson. She is the main piano accordion tutor at the World Music Centre, University of Limerick, Ireland and a regular tutor at the BMus Degree in folk and traditional music at Newcastle University and The Sage Gateshead.

She left The Poozies and Swåp in 2007 in order to work on other projects. In 2012, she released a solo five-track album entitled Essentially Invisible to the Eye.

== Selected discography ==
- The Palm Of Your Hand - Roger Wilson (1987)
- Beating The Drum - Sally Barker & The Rhythm (1992)
- Signs - The Kathryn Tickell Band (1993)
- Chantoozies - The Poozies (1993)
- Drops Of Springwater (1994)
- The Silver Spire (1994)
- Irish Choice Tune Book (1994)
- Compilation: Across The Water (1994)
- Courage, Love and Grace - Pete Morton (1995)
- Dansoozies - The Poozies (1995)
- Shhh - Ian Carr & Karen Tweed (1995)
- Fyace - Ian Carr & Karen Tweed (1997)
- SWÅP - Swåp (1997)
- New Directions In The Old - Roy Bailey (1997)
- Come Raise Your Head - The Poozies (1998)
- Sic - Swåp (1999)
- Half As Happy As We - The Two Duos Quartet (1999)
- Infinite Blue - The Poozies (2000)
- Live på Halkaerkro: Compilation of live tracks - The Poozies, Swåp, Kathryn Tickell Band (2000)
- Coda - Roy Bailey (2000)
- Raise your head: A Retrospective - The Poozies (2001)
- May Monday - Karen Tweed & Timo Alakotila (2001)
- Mosquito Hunter - Swåp (2002)
- One Roof Under - Andy Cutting & Karen Tweed (2002)
- Faerd - Faerd (2003)
- Changed Days Same Roots - The Poozies (2003)
- Each Step on the Way - Tony Hilliard (2005)
- Du Da - Swåp (2005)
- Gastbud - Morten Alfred Hoirup and Harald Haaugaard (2005)
- Essentially Invisible to the Eye - Karen Tweed (produced by Bruce Molsky) (2012)
- Island Girls - Karen Tweed and Margaret Robertson (6 December 2021)
