= The Voice UK series 3 =

Third series of The Voice UK

The Voice UK
- Series 3
- Hosted by: Emma Willis (BBC One); Marvin Humes (BBC One); Zoë Ball (BBC Two; live shows only)
- Coaches: will.i.am; Sir Tom Jones; Kylie Minogue; Ricky Wilson
- Winner: Jermain Jackman
- Winning mentor: will.i.am
- Runners-up: Christina Marie and Sally Barker
- Finals venue: Elstree Studios
- No. of episodes: 15

Release
- Original network: BBC One; BBC Two (Louder on Two)
- Original release: 11 January – 5 April 2014

Series chronology
- ← Previous; Series 2 Next → Series 4

The Voice UK is a British television music competition to find new singing talent. The third series began airing on 11 January 2014 on BBC One, as opposed to the usual start in March. will.i.am and Tom Jones returned as coaches, while Kylie Minogue and Ricky Wilson joined the show as replacements for former coaches, Jessie J and Danny O'Donoghue. Emma Willis and Marvin Humes co-presented the show for the first time, replacing Holly Willoughby and Reggie Yates.

On 9 February 2014, it was announced that a new spin off show called The Voice: Louder on Two would air every weekday during the live shows on BBC Two hosted by Zoë Ball.

Jermain Jackman of Team Will was crowned as the winner of the series on 5 April 2014, making him the first male artist to win the show. Also, Jackman is the first winner in the show's history (before Ruti Olajugbagbe in the seventh series, Blessing Chitapa in the ninth series and Craig Eddie in the tenth series) to have only received one-chair turn in the blind auditions.

This series was the only series to feature Minogue as a coach.

== Coaches and presenters ==
Coaches and Presenters for Series 3 of The Voice UK

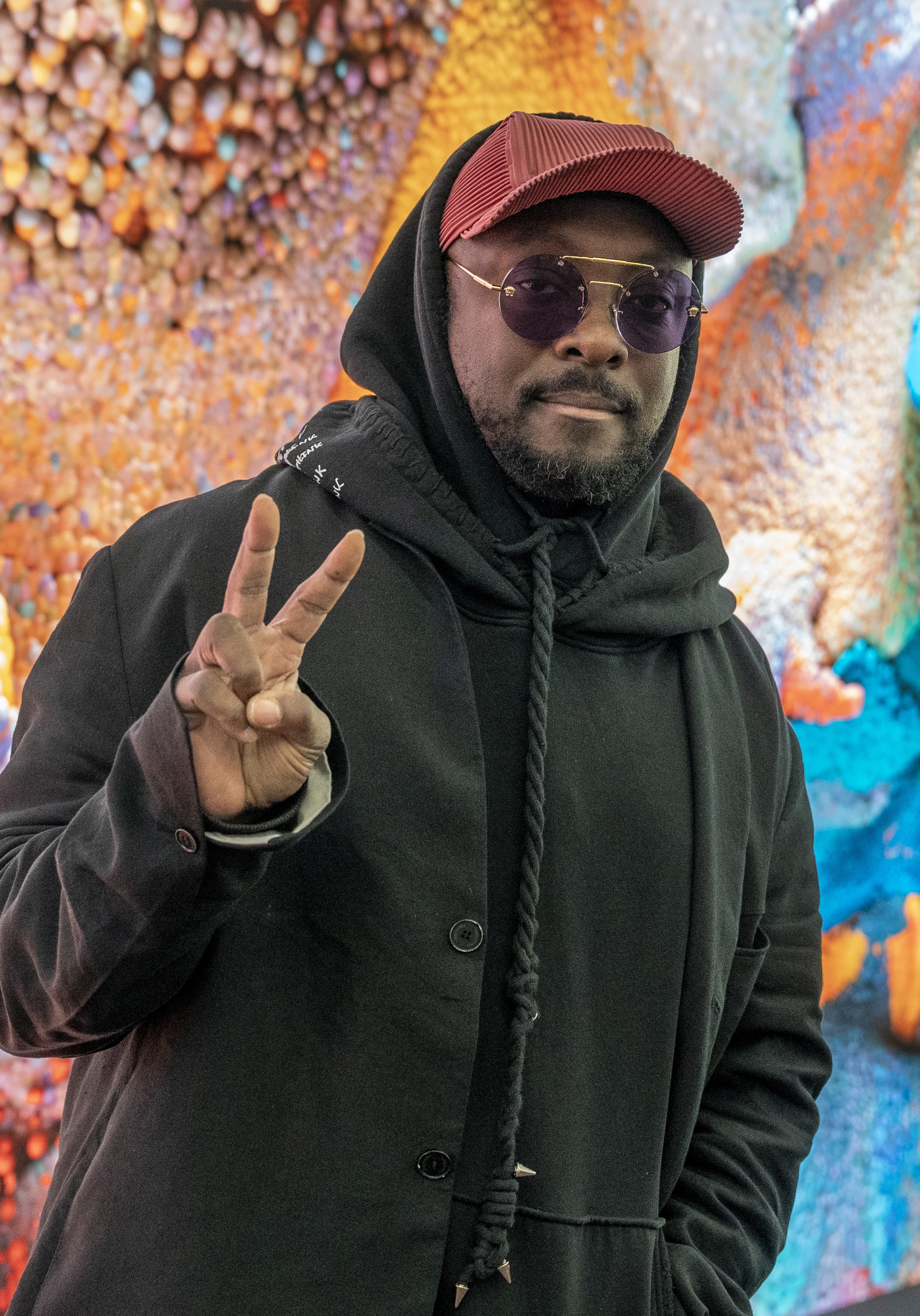
will.i.am

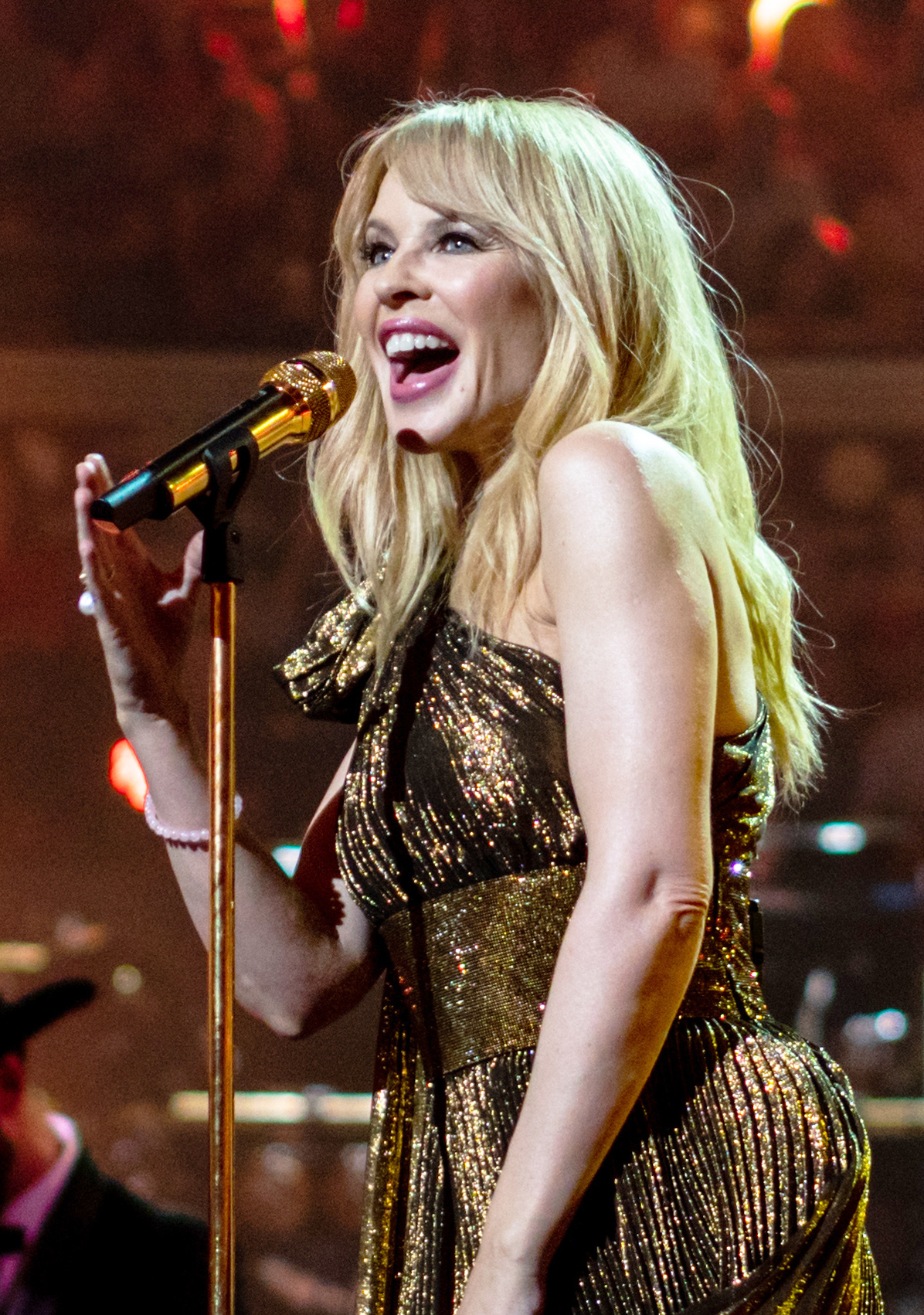
Kylie Minogue

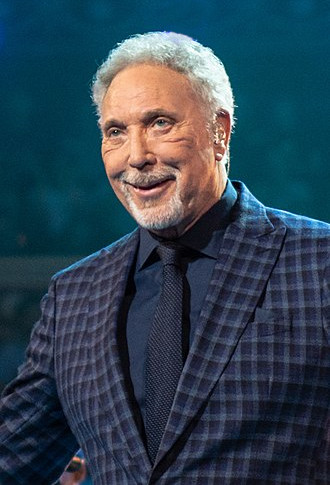
Sir Tom Jones

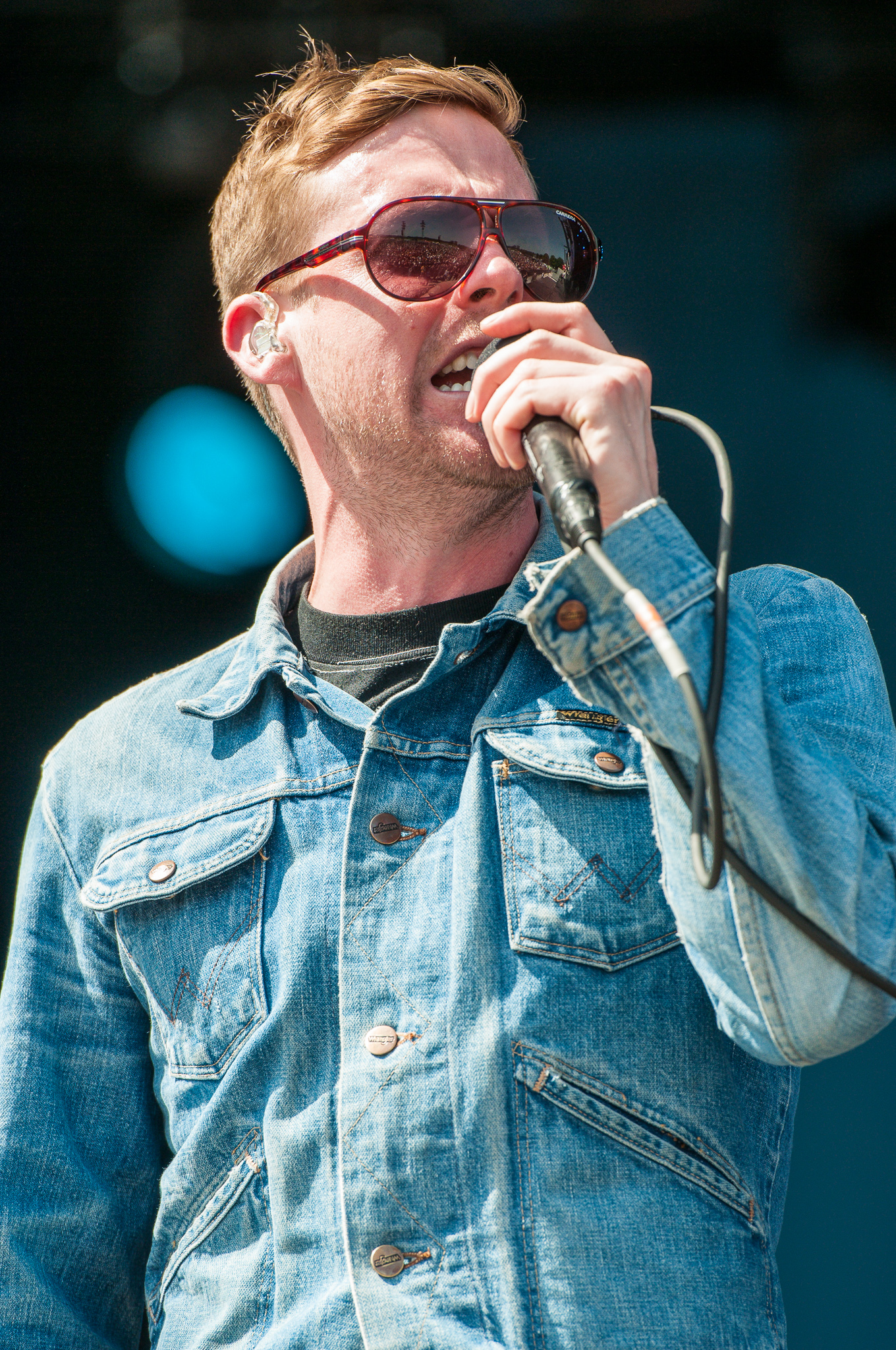
Ricky Wilson

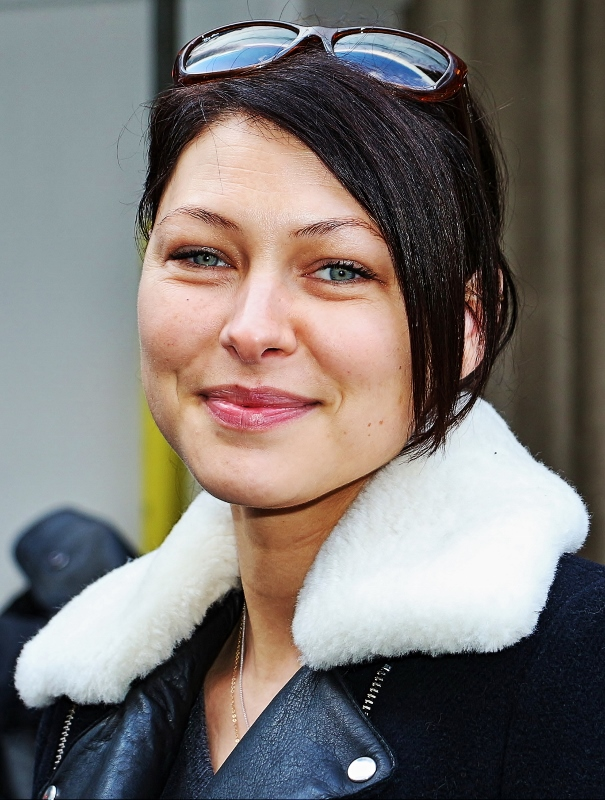
Emma Willis (host)

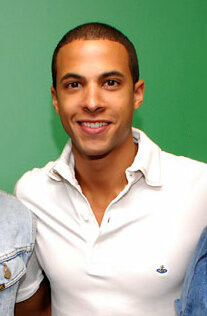
Marvin Humes (host)

On 5 July 2013, Jessie J announced that she would not be returning as a coach for the third series due to touring commitments in support for her second album, Alive. On 16 July, it was announced that Danny O'Donoghue would not be returning either as he wanted to concentrate on The Script. People rumoured to be in the running to join the panel as replacements for Jessie J and O'Donoghue included Rita Ora, Emeli Sande, Kylie Minogue, Marvin Humes, Melanie C and Cheryl Cole, though Cole was ruled out of the running after rejoining rival show, The X Factor. On 11 September, it was confirmed that Minogue would become a coach for the third series, along with the confirmation of returning coaches will.i.am and Tom Jones. On 15 September, Holly Willoughby and Reggie Yates announced that they would not be returning to co-present the third series, and Emma Willis was announced as Willoughby's replacement. On 17 September, Humes confirmed that he would replace Yates as Willis' co-presenter. On 19 September, Kaiser Chiefs singer Ricky Wilson confirmed that he would be a coach and O'Donoghue's replacement for the third series. On 9 February 2014, it was announced that Zoë Ball would present spin-off show The Voice: Louder on Two. The show was axed after the series.

== Promotion ==
On 21 December 2013, the first trailer for the series premiered following the final of Strictly Come Dancing at 21:50. The trailer features all four coaches dressed in different medical costumes. They overlook a hospital ward, as many babies cry behind them. Then, the sound of a beautiful voice is heard from the direction of the babies, and stops all the crying. The voice captures the attention of Minogue and Wilson, who both turn around to see who is singing. will.i.am and Jones then turn, as the voice is revealed to be one of the babies, prompting the tagline "A Star is Born". On 1 January 2014, a new edition of the trailer aired, where another baby sings, in a more R&B style, also impressing the coaches.

As part of BBC One's promotion of its 2014 schedule, The Voice UK aired the first clips of the Blind Auditions, featuring a male artist walking to the microphone, a mother being reunited with her daughter following her performance, Emma Willis with a family watching a performance, the coaches' opening performance, and Minogue opening the trailer saying "This waiting, it's killer. And the anticipation", and she also tells an artist (unknown to the viewer) that they have "done the thing which is the thing that we [coaches] are waiting for."

On 6 January 2014, the series had its press launch at Broadcasting House. All four coaches were present, as were the two new presenters. The coaches spoke to members of the press, and in the week leading up to the premiere, the show was highly publicised by the British media, with coaches giving interviews in the Radio Times, The Metro, Digital Spy and The Telegraph. Later that day, will.i.am and Kylie Minogue appeared on the new-look One Show, where they talked about the show and last year's finalist, Leah McFall.

== Teams ==
The teams were revealed during 22 February blind audition episode.

Colour key

- Winner
- Runner-up
- Fourth place
- Eliminated in the live shows
- Eliminated in the Knockout rounds
- Artist was stolen by another coach in the Battle rounds (Name is struck-through)
- Eliminated in the Battle rounds

Coach	Top 48 Artists				
will.i.am					
will.i.am	Jermain Jackman	Sophie-May Williams	Iesher Haughton	Anna McLuckie	James Byron
will.i.am	Callum Crowley	Nomakhosi Nkosi	~~Femi Santiago~~	~~Jessica Steele~~	Cherri Prince
will.i.am	Kiki de Ville	Tom Barnwell	Sarah Eden-Winn		
Kylie Minogue					
Kylie Minogue	Jamie Johnson	Lee Glasson	Rachael O'Connor	Jade Mayjean Peters	Jai McConnell
Kylie Minogue	Leo Ihenacho	Femi Santiago	~~Nomakhosi Nkosi~~	~~Steven Alexander~~	Gemyni
Kylie Minogue	Joe Keegan	Amelia O'Connell	Jimmy Weston		
Sir Tom Jones					
Sir Tom Jones	Sally Barker	Bizzi Dixon	Georgia Harrup	Celestine	Gary Poole
Sir Tom Jones	Melissa Gill	Steven Alexander	Elesha Paul Moses	Leverne Scott-Roberts	Vicky Jones
Sir Tom Jones	Mairead Conlon	Kenny Thompson	Talia Smith		
Ricky Wilson					
Ricky Wilson	Christina Marie	Chris Royal	Emily Adams	Jazz Bates-Chambers	Beth McCarthy
Ricky Wilson	Max Murphy	Jessica Steele	Luciee Marie Closier	Myles Evans	Jamie Lovatt
Ricky Wilson	Nathan Amzi	Kelsey-Beth Crossley	Tila & Tavelah		
Stolen artists are italicised.

== Blind auditions ==
The blind auditions returned to dock10, MediaCityUK on 1 October 2013. Each coach has the length of the artists' performance to decide if they want that artist on their team. Should two or more coaches want the same artist, then the artist will choose their coach.

Colour key
✔	Coach hit their "I WANT YOU" button
	Artist defaulted to this coach's team
	Artist elected to join this coach's team
	Artist eliminated with no coach pressing their "I WANT YOU" button
	Artist received an 'All Turn'.

=== Episode 1 (11 January) ===
The premiere was 90 minutes long, and aired from 7.00pm till 8.30pm.

- Group performance: The Voice UK coaches – Medley of "I Predict a Riot"/"Can't Get You Out of My Head"

Order	Artist	Age	Song	Coaches and artists choices			
Order	Artist	Age	Song	will.i.am	Kylie	Tom	Ricky
1	Lee Glasson	31	"Can't Get You Out of My Head"	✔	✔	✔	✔
2	Christina Marie	20	"I Have Nothing"	—	✔	✔	✔
3	Danielle Chevannes	25	"L-O-V-E"	—	—	—	—
4	Anna McLuckie	16	"Get Lucky"	✔	—	—	✔
5	Tara Lewis	43	"You Make My Dreams"	—	—	—	—
6	Ryan Green	16	"Don't Go"	—	—	—	—
7	Beth McCarthy	16	"Sexy and I Know It"	—	✔	—	✔
8	Sally Barker	54	"Don't Let Me Be Misunderstood"	—	—	✔	—
9	Leo Ihenacho	36	"Holding Back the Years"	—	✔	✔	—

=== Episode 2 (18 January) ===
The second episode was broadcast on 18 January, was 80 minutes long, and aired from 7.00pm till 8.20pm.

Order	Artist	Age	Song	Coaches and artists choices			
Order	Artist	Age	Song	will.i.am	Kylie	Tom	Ricky
1	Jamie Johnson	19	"So Sick"	—	✔	✔	✔
2	Mairead Conlon	31	"Purple Rain"	—	✔	✔	✔
3	Lewis Clay	31	"Cryin'	—	—	—	—
4	Jimmy Weston	39	"Desperado"	—	✔	✔	✔
5	Kelsey-Beth Crossley	21	"Fell in Love with a Girl"	—	✔	—	✔
6	Bob Blakeley	55	"Cry Me a River"	—	—	—	—
7	Miles Anthony	21	"I (Who Have Nothing)"	—	—	—	—
8	Sophie-May Williams	17	"Time After Time"	✔	—	—	—
9	Jermain Jackman	19	"And I Am Telling You I'm Not Going"	✔	—	—	—

=== Episode 3 (25 January) ===
This was the first show in which one coach did not get any artists. Kylie did not get any. This show was 75 minutes long, and aired from 7.00pm until 8.15pm.

Order	Artist	Age	Song	Coaches and artists choices			
Order	Artist	Age	Song	will.i.am	Kylie	Tom	Ricky
1	Andy Otley	20	"Dance with Me Tonight"	—	—	—	—
2	Iesher Haughton	19	"Who's Lovin' You"	✔	✔	✔	✔
3	Paul Black	45	"Jump"	—	—	—	—
4	Vicky Jones	29	"Bed of Roses"	—	✔	✔	—
5	Georgia Harrup	27	"Hallelujah I Love Her So"	—	—	✔	—
6	Celestine	30	"All This Love That I'm Giving"	—	—	✔	—
7	Si Genaro	42	"Down Under"	—	—	—	—
8	Nathan Kobierowski	19	"You Give Me Something"	—	—	—	—
9	John Rush	N/A	"Bad Romance"	—	—	—	—
10	Jeff Anderson	24	"Uprising"	—	—	—	—
11	Myles Evans	26	"High Hopes"	—	—	✔	✔
12	Leverne Scott-Roberts	31	"Explosions"	✔	✔	✔	✔

=== Episode 4 (1 February) ===
This show was 80 minutes long, and aired from 7.15pm till 8.35pm.

Order	Artist	Age	Song	Coaches and artists choices			
Order	Artist	Age	Song	will.i.am	Kylie	Tom	Ricky
1	Jessica Steele	22	"She Said"	✔	✔	✔	✔
2	Bunny Tan	56	"Rocket Man"	—	—	—	—
3	Sarah Eden-Winn	27	"One Night Only"	✔	—	✔	✔
4	Tila & Tavelah	18	"Just Can't Get Enough"	—	—	—	✔
5	Gemyni	26	"Fantasy"	—	✔	✔	✔
6	Vela	52&59	"Homeward Bound"	—	—	—	—
7	Milly J	N/A	"Summertime"	—	—	—	—
8	Charlie Wood	N/A	"I Can't Stand the Rain"	—	—	—	—
9	Jai McConnell	24	"Never Forget You"	✔	✔	✔	✔
10	John Quinn	31	"Lightning Bolt"	—	—	—	—
11	Melissa Gill	21	"Love Is A Losing Game"	—	✔	✔	✔
12	Leanne Jones	28	"Skyfall"	—	—	—	—
13	Rachael O'Connor	16	"Clown"	—	✔	✔	✔

=== Episode 5 (8 February) ===
This episode was 85 minutes long, and aired from 7.10pm till 8.35pm.

Order	Artist	Age	Song	Coaches and artists choices			
Order	Artist	Age	Song	will.i.am	Kylie	Tom	Ricky
1	Steven Alexander	27	"Your Game"	—	✔	✔	—
2	Fiona Kelly	56	"Rule the World"	—	—	—	—
3	Chris Royal	25	"Wake Me Up"	—	✔	✔	✔
4	Nick Dixon	17	"Home Again"	—	—	—	—
5	Elesha Paul Moses	32	"Everything Has Changed"	—	—	✔	—
6	Lucy Winter	29	"Somebody to Love""	—	—	—	—
7	Max Murphy	18	"Electric Feel"	—	—	—	✔
8	Joe Keegan	16	"Keep Your Head Up"	—	✔	—	✔
9	James Byron	24	"Cry Baby"	✔	—	—	—
10	Reece Bahia	18	"What Makes You Beautiful"	—	—	—	—
11	Jolan	18	"Beneath Your Beautiful"	—	—	—	—
12	Yinka Williams	24	"Paris (Ooh La La)"	—	—	—	—
13	Jade Mayjean Peters	21	"Sweet About Me"	✔	✔	✔	✔
14	Femi Santiago	27	"My Cherie Amour"	✔	—	—	—

=== Episode 6 (15 February) ===
This show was 80 minutes long, and aired from 7.10pm till 8.30pm.

Order	Artist	Age	Song	Coaches and artists choices			
Order	Artist	Age	Song	will.i.am	Kylie	Tom	Ricky
1	Emily Adams	18	"I'd Rather Go Blind"	—	—	—	✔
2	John Rafferty	35	"Take Me Home, Country Roads"	—	—	—	—
3	Talia Smith	31	"Hell on Heels"	—	—	✔	—
4	Buheiji	N/A	"Dog Days Are Over"	—	—	—	—
5	Leanne & Natalie	N/A	"My Man Music"	—	—	—	—
6	Shenton Dixon	49	"Ain't No Stoppin' Us Now"	—	—	—	—
7	Bizzi Dixon	42	"Use Somebody"	—	✔	✔	—
8	Nathan Amzi	32	"Gravity"	—	—	—	✔
9	Kiki de Ville	40	"Stone Cold Sober"	✔	—	—	—
10	Callum Crowley	22	"Climax"	✔	✔	—	✔
11	Marc William	24	"Whole Lotta Love"	—	—	—	—
12	Paul Raj	25	"Fine China"	—	—	—	—
13	Amrick Channa	40	"Pride (A Deeper Love)"	—	—	—	—
14	Jazz Bates-Chambers	17	"Crazy"	—	—	—	✔
15	Amelia O'Connell	16	"The First Time Ever I Saw Your Face"	—	✔	✔	✔

=== Episode 7 (22 February) ===
This episode was 90 minutes long, and aired from 7.00pm till 8.30pm.

Order	Artist	Age	Song	Coaches and artists choices			
Order	Artist	Age	Song	will.i.am	Kylie	Tom	Ricky
1	Tom Barnwell	26	"American Boy"	✔	✔	✔	✔
2	Johnny Kohlmeyer	30	"All Night Long (All Night)"	—	—	—	—
3	Jane Fraser	56	"Heard It Through The Grapevine"	—	—	—	—
4	Roxanne Yarnold	22	"Shake It Out"	—	—	—	—
5	Gary Poole	48	"Valerie"	—	—	✔	✔
6	Angie Brown	50	"I'm Gonna Get You"	—	—	—	—
7	Luciee Marie Closier	16	"Mama Do (Uh Oh, Uh Oh)"	—	—	—	✔
8	Teresa Vasiliou	61	"I Found Someone"	—	—	—	—
9	Bianca Nicholas	24	"One"	—	—	—	—
10	Aaliyah Dickens	17	"Read All About It"	—	—	—	—
11	Kenny Thompson	29	"New York State of Mind"	—	—	✔	✔
12	Joe West	19	"Mirrors"	—	—	—N/a	—
13	Jamie Lovatt	24	"Everybody's Free (To Feel Good)"	—	✔	—N/a	✔
14	Nomakhosi Nkosi	22	"Get Ready"	—	✔	—N/a	—N/a
15	Liz Oki	61	"A Different Corner"	—	—N/a	—N/a	—N/a
16	Pete Davies	N/A	"Roxanne"	—	—N/a	—N/a	—N/a
17	Erin	27	"White Flag"	—	—N/a	—N/a	—N/a
18	Cherri Prince	33	"Stop"	✔	—N/a	—N/a	—N/a

== Battle rounds ==
The Battle rounds were broadcast over two episodes on the 1 and 8 March 2014. Each coach was joined by an advisor, with Minogue being joined by Scissor Sisters frontman Jake Shears, Wilson by singer Katy B, Jones with Tinie Tempah and will.i.am with last year's runner up and from his own team, Leah McFall, and once again by Dante Santiago. The first episode was 130 minutes long, and aired from 7.00pm till 9.10pm, and the second was 130 minutes long, and aired from 7.00pm till 9.10pm. Like the previous season, each coach was given one steal, they can hit their button as many times as they like, but can only steal one artist from another coach.

Colour key

✔	Coach hit his/her "I WANT YOU" button
	Artist won the Battle and advanced to the Knockouts
	Artist lost the Battle but was stolen by another coach and advances to the Knockouts
	Artist lost the Battle and was eliminated

Episode	Coach	Order	Winner	Song	Loser	'Steal' result			
Episode	Coach	Order	Winner	Song	Loser	will.i.am	Kylie	Tom	Ricky
Episode 1 (1 March)	will.i.am	1	Jermain Jackman	"I Knew You Were Waiting (For Me)"	Sarah Eden-Winn	—N/a	—	—	—
Episode 1 (1 March)	Kylie Minogue	2	Lee Glasson	"When You Were Young"	Jimmy Weston	—	—N/a	—	—
Episode 1 (1 March)	Tom Jones	3	Sally Barker	"Dear Darlin'"	Talia Smith	—	—	—N/a	—
Episode 1 (1 March)	Ricky Wilson	4	Beth McCarthy	"Roar"	Tila & Tavelah	—	—	—	—N/a
Episode 1 (1 March)	Kylie Minogue	5	Leo Ihenacho	"Thunder in My Heart"	Steven Alexander	—	—N/a	✔	—
Episode 1 (1 March)	Tom Jones	6	Bizzi Dixon	"Hey Jude"	Kenny Thompson	—	—	Steal used	—
Episode 1 (1 March)	will.i.am	7	Callum Crowley	"P.Y.T. (Pretty Young Thing)"	Tom Barnwell	—N/a	—	Steal used	—
Episode 1 (1 March)	Kylie Minogue	8	Jai McConnell	"Tainted Love"	Nomakhosi Nkosi	✔	—N/a	Steal used	—
Episode 1 (1 March)	Ricky Wilson	9	Emily Adams	"Fighter"	Kelsey-Beth Crossley	Steal used	—N/a	Steal used	
Episode 1 (1 March)	Tom Jones	10	Celestine	"It's My Party"	Mairead Conlon	Steal used	—	Steal used	—
Episode 1 (1 March)	will.i.am	11	Anna McLuckie	"Good Riddance (Time of Your Life)"	Jessica Steele	Steal used	—	Steal used	✔
Episode 1 (1 March)	Ricky Wilson	12	Christina Marie	"The Power of Love"	Nathan Amzi	Steal used	—	Steal used	Steal used
Episode 2 (8 March)	Ricky Wilson	1	Chris Royal	"Rolling in the Deep"	Jamie Lovatt	Steal used	—	Steal used	Steal used
Episode 2 (8 March)	Kylie Minogue	2	Rachael O'Connor	"Holy Grail"	Amelia O'Connell	Steal used	—N/a	Steal used	Steal used
Episode 2 (8 March)	will.i.am	3	James Byron	"Because the Night"	Kiki de Ville	Steal used	—	Steal used	Steal used
Episode 2 (8 March)	Tom Jones	4	Melissa Gill	"Just Give Me a Reason"	Vicky Jones	Steal used	—	Steal used	Steal used
Episode 2 (8 March)	Ricky Wilson	5	Max Murphy	"Eleanor Rigby"	Myles Evans	Steal used	—	Steal used	Steal used
Episode 2 (8 March)	will.i.am	6	Sophie May Williams	"The Love Cats"	Cherri Prince	Steal used	—	Steal used	Steal used
Episode 2 (8 March)	Kylie Minogue	7	Jamie Johnson	"Counting Stars"	Joe Keegan	Steal used	—N/a	Steal used	Steal used
Episode 2 (8 March)	will.i.am	8	Iesher Haughton	"Stop, Look, Listen (To Your Heart)"	Femi Santiago	Steal used	✔	Steal used	Steal used
Episode 2 (8 March)	Tom Jones	9	Georgia Harrup	"22"	Leverne Scott-Roberts	Steal used	Steal used	Steal used	Steal used
Episode 2 (8 March)	Kylie Minogue	10	Jade Mayjean Peters	"...Baby One More Time"	Gemyni	Steal used	Steal used	Steal used	Steal used
Episode 2 (8 March)	Tom Jones	11	Gary Poole	"Caught Up"	Elesha Paul Moses	Steal used	Steal used	Steal used	Steal used
Episode 2 (8 March)	Ricky Wilson	12	Jazz Bates-Chambers	"Grenade"	Luciee Marie Closier	Steal used	Steal used	Steal used	Steal used

== Knockout rounds ==
The Knockout rounds were broadcast over two episodes on the 15 and 16 March 2014. This series, however, the show decided to drop the "fast pass", and instead of singing in groups of three, each contestant sang in front of everyone else on the team. At the end of each knockout round the coach then decided out of all their contestants which three contestants to take to the live shows. The first episode was 75 minutes long, and aired from 7.20pm till 8.35pm, and the second was 75 minutes long, and aired from 7.45pm till 9.00pm.

Colour key:

Artist won the Knockouts and advanced to the Live shows
Artist lost the Knockouts and was eliminated

Episode	Order	Coach	Artist	Song	Result
Episode 1 (15 March)	1	Kylie Minogue	Leo Ihenacho	"I Want to Know What Love Is"	Eliminated
Episode 1 (15 March)	2	Kylie Minogue	Jai McConnell	"Take Your Mama"	Eliminated
Episode 1 (15 March)	3	Kylie Minogue	Jade Mayjean Peters	"Blue Moon"	Eliminated
Episode 1 (15 March)	4	Kylie Minogue	Lee Glasson	"Careless Whisper"	Advanced
Episode 1 (15 March)	5	Kylie Minogue	Femi Santiago	"California Dreamin'"	Eliminated
Episode 1 (15 March)	6	Kylie Minogue	Rachael O'Connor	"New York"	Advanced
Episode 1 (15 March)	7	Kylie Minogue	Jamie Johnson	"Sex on Fire"	Advanced
Episode 1 (15 March)	1	Tom Jones	Celestine	"You Might Need Somebody"	Eliminated
Episode 1 (15 March)	2	Tom Jones	Melissa Gill	"I Love Rock 'n' Roll"	Eliminated
Episode 1 (15 March)	3	Tom Jones	Gary Poole	"Freedom! '90"	Eliminated
Episode 1 (15 March)	4	Tom Jones	Bizzi Dixon	"When I Need You"	Advanced
Episode 1 (15 March)	5	Tom Jones	Georgia Harrup	"Three Little Birds"	Advanced
Episode 1 (15 March)	6	Tom Jones	Steven Alexander	"Grace Kelly"	Eliminated
Episode 1 (15 March)	7	Tom Jones	Sally Barker	"Walk On By"	Advanced
Episode 2 (16 March)	1	Ricky Willson	Jessica Steele	"La La La"	Eliminated
Episode 2 (16 March)	2	Ricky Willson	Chris Royal	"Over The Rainbow"	Advanced
Episode 2 (16 March)	3	Ricky Willson	Beth McCarthy	"Teenage Dirtbag"	Eliminated
Episode 2 (16 March)	4	Ricky Willson	Christina Marie	"Vision of Love”	Advanced
Episode 2 (16 March)	5	Ricky Willson	Jazz Bates-Chambers	"Work It Out"	Eliminated
Episode 2 (16 March)	6	Ricky Willson	Max Murphy	"Home"	Eliminated
Episode 2 (16 March)	7	Ricky Willson	Emily Adams	"Slip"	Advanced
Episode 2 (16 March)	1	will.i.am	James Byron	"Love Hurts"	Eliminated
Episode 2 (16 March)	2	will.i.am	Iesher Haughton	"Try It on My Own"	Advanced
Episode 2 (16 March)	3	will.i.am	Callum Crowley	"Sound of the Underground"	Eliminated
Episode 2 (16 March)	4	will.i.am	Jermain Jackman	"A House Is Not a Home"	Advanced
Episode 2 (16 March)	5	will.i.am	Anna McLuckie	"Autumn"	Eliminated
Episode 2 (16 March)	6	will.i.am	Nomakhosi Nkosi	"Runaway Baby"	Eliminated
Episode 2 (16 March)	7	will.i.am	Sophie May Williams	"Moon River"	Advanced

== Live shows ==
The live performance shows were aired live from Elstree Studios and ran for three consecutive weeks, beginning on 22 March 2014. The final took place on 5 April 2014.

OneRepublic and Jason Derulo performed during the quarter-final, while Enrique Iglesias performed in the semi-final, alongside Shakira. Aloe Blacc and Paloma Faith performed during the final.

=== Results summary ===
Team's colour key
Team Will
Team Kylie
Team Tom
Team Ricky
Result's colour key
Artist given 'Fast Pass' by their coach and did not face the public vote
Artist received the fewest votes and was eliminated
Artist won the competition

Weekly results per artist
Contestant	Week 1	Week 2	Week 3	
Contestant	Week 1	Week 2	Round 1	Round 2
Jermain Jackman	Fast Pass	Safe	Safe	Winner (week 3)
Christina Marie	Fast Pass	Safe	Safe	Runner-up (week 3)
Sally Barker	Fast Pass	Safe	Safe	Runner-up (week 3)
Jamie Johnson	Fast Pass	Safe	4th	Eliminated (week 3)
Bizzi Dixon	Safe	Eliminated	Eliminated (week 2)	
Chris Royal	Safe	Eliminated	Eliminated (week 2)	
Lee Glasson	Safe	Eliminated	Eliminated (week 2)	
Sophie-May Williams	Safe	Eliminated	Eliminated (week 2)	
Emily Adams	Eliminated	Eliminated (week 1)		
Georgia Harrup	Eliminated	Eliminated (week 1)		
Iesher Haughton	Eliminated	Eliminated (week 1)		
Rachael O'Connor	Eliminated	Eliminated (week 1)		

=== Live show details ===
==== Week 1: Quarter-final (22 March) ====
After all three artists from each team have performed, the coach will then have to decide which artist they want to give a "fast pass" to and put straight through to the semi-final. The voting lines for the remaining artists will then open after all twelve artists have performed.

The first part of the episode was 125 minutes long, and aired from 6.45pm until 8.40pm. The second part aired from 8.50pm until 9.25pm.

- Group performances: Team Will ("Scream & Shout"), Team Kylie ("All The Lovers"), Team Tom ("Burning Down The House") and Team Ricky ("Oh My God")
- Special musical guests: Jason Derulo (medley of "Trumpets"/"Stupid Love"/"Talk Dirty") and OneRepublic ("Counting Stars")

Order	Coach	Artist	Song	Result
1	will.i.am	Jermain Jackman	"Treasure"	Fast pass
2	will.i.am	Sophie-May Williams	"Moondance"	Advanced
3	will.i.am	Iesher Haughton	"Rather Be"	Eliminated
4	Kylie Minogue	Jamie Johnson	"A Thousand Miles"	Fast pass
5	Kylie Minogue	Lee Glasson	"Help Me Make It Through the Night"	Advanced
6	Kylie Minogue	Rachael O'Connor	"Shine a Light"	Eliminated
7	Tom Jones	Bizzi Dixon	"If You Really Love Me"	Advanced
8	Tom Jones	Sally Barker	"To Love Somebody"	Fast pass
9	Tom Jones	Georgia Harrup	"Money on My Mind"	Eliminated
10	Ricky Wilson	Chris Royal	"One Day Like This"	Advanced
11	Ricky Wilson	Emily Adams	"Happy"	Eliminated
12	Ricky Wilson	Christina Marie	"Everlong"	Fast pass

==== Week 2: Semi-final (29 March) ====
This episode was 130 minutes long, and aired from 7.00pm until 9.10pm.

- Group performances: Team Tom with Tom Jones ("Dancing in the Street"), Team Ricky with Ricky Wilson ("You Really Got Me"); Team Kylie with Kylie Minogue ("Into the Blue") and Team will with will.i.am ("Let's Dance")
- Musical guests: Enrique Iglesias ("I'm a Freak") and Shakira ("Empire")

Order	Coach	Artist	Song	Result
1	Tom Jones	Sally Barker	"The Whole of the Moon"	Safe
2	Tom Jones	Bizzi Dixon	"Everything Must Change"	Eliminated
3	Ricky Wilson	Christina Marie	"Bang Bang (My Baby Shot Me Down)"	Safe
4	Ricky Wilson	Chris Royal	"Smile"	Eliminated
5	Kylie Minogue	Lee Glasson	"Strong"	Eliminated
6	Kylie Minogue	Jamie Johnson	"I Can't Make You Love Me"	Safe
7	will.i.am	Jermain Jackman	"Without You"	Safe
8	will.i.am	Sophie-May Williams	"Royals"	Eliminated

==== Week 3: Final (5 April) ====
This episode was 125 minutes long, and aired from 7.00pm until 9.05pm.

- Group performance: The Voice UK Coaches ("Rocks")
- Musical guests: Aloe Blacc ("The Man") and Paloma Faith ("Can't Rely on You")

Order	Coach	Artist	First song	Second song (duet)	Third song	Result
1	Ricky Wilson	Christina Marie	"Fix You"	"Coming Home" (with Ricky Wilson)	"The Power of Love"	Runner-up
2	Tom Jones	Sally Barker	"Both Sides, Now"	"Walking in Memphis" (with Tom Jones)	"Dear Darlin'"	Runner-up
3	Will.i.am	Jermain Jackman	"Wrecking Ball"	"Pure Imagination" (with will.i.am)	"And I Am Telling You I'm Not Going"	Winner
4	Kylie Minogue	Jamie Johnson	"Missing You"	"There Must Be an Angel (Playing with My Heart)" (with Kylie Minogue)	N/A (already eliminated)	Eliminated

== Post-show success ==
Bob Blakeley, who was originally rejected by all four coaches, was given a record deal on live television. He has since released an album.

Anna McLuckie's rendition of "Get Lucky" received much positive feedback particularly on YouTube, as the official BBC version of the audition received three million views only a month after it was released, and over twenty-eight million views up to now. Other users uploaded the video, each getting millions of views as well. This was particularly noted as none other from this series had achieved more than a million views yet, and had even surpassed videos from Series 1 and 2. When Anna was eliminated during the Knockout Rounds, her coach Will.i.am was subject to much criticism, particularly on Twitter and YouTube. Celebrities such as One Direction's Niall Horan even disagreed with his decision. Since the show, McLuckie has continued her studies.

During the live shows, the BBC released studio versions of the songs to iTunes. Christina Marie's rendition of Everlong reached the iTunes Top 40. This was particularly noted as the week prior to the live shows, she had been ill, and had rarely rehearsed it to preserve her voice.

== Reception ==
=== Critical reception ===
Following lukewarm responses from the British media after the first two series of the show, the response to the third series premiere was largely positive. Ed Power from The Daily Telegraph gave the series premiere 3 stars, praising Minogue for being "glamorous, agreeably giggly [and] a card-carrying national treasure". Power said that she "was a natural" and that she had "spontaneity to go with sass". He also complimented Wilson for being "chipper and unforced". Catriona Wightman from Digital Spy was very positive about the premiere, claiming that despite "reservations about whether Kylie would really manage to break through the nice girl mode" she was "brilliantly watchable", and that "Kylie's definitely a hit". The second blind audition continued to receive positive reviews from critics, receiving 4 (out of 5) stars by Michael Hogan from The Daily Telegraph, who commented that the "two new coaches add verve to The Voice UK and the newly confident singing contest seems to have found its feet" and that the new series "is a leap forward and the franchise has finally hit its stride." However, the Battle Rounds were criticised, with Gabriel Tate from The Daily Telegraph stating there were "few stand out moments" in the second battle round. He also said that "after such a promising start to the third series, it's a shame to see that The Voice falling foul once again of slack editing and familiarity of format." Keith Watson of The Metro gave the second battle round two stars, stating that the show was full of "overambitious [artists] being made promises of stardom that will never come true". The final received more positive reviews from the press, with Ed Power from The Daily Telegraph giving it 4 out of 5 stars, stating that the "tension was terrible" and it was a "drama soaked final". He also answered whether or not the addition of Kylie Minogue on the show would be successful, by saying that "we needn't have fretted. Kylie, it was clear from the very first episode, was a natural in the coaches chair." He concluded that "series three was assuredly a triumph – after much smoke and noise, The Voice has at last achieved lift-off."

=== Ratings ===
Episode	Date	Official ratings (in millions)	BBC One weekly rank	Weekly rank	Share	Source
Blind auditions 1	11 January	9.35	2	2	34.8%	
Blind auditions 2	18 January	8.88	3	3	32.8%	
Blind auditions 3	25 January	8.86	2	4	35.2%	
Blind auditions 4	1 February	9.37	2	2	36.6%	
Blind auditions 5	8 February	9.41	2	2	36.5%	
Blind auditions 6	15 February	8.77	3	3	33.7%	
Blind auditions 7	22 February	8.33	4	5	31.2%	
Battle rounds 1	1 March	8.06	6	8	30.4%	
Battle rounds 2	8 March	7.65	5	7	29.3%	
Knockout rounds 1	15 March	7.56	4	7	29.2%	
Knockout rounds 2	16 March	7.72	3	5	27.0%	
Live show 1	22 March	7.14	5	8	27.6%	
Live results 1	22 March	6.65	7	11	27.6%	
Live show 2	29 March	6.67	6	11	28.3%	
Live final	5 April	7.15	6	11	30.7%	
Series average	2014	8.10	—N/a	—N/a	31.6%	
