= Patsy Seddon =

Scottish musician

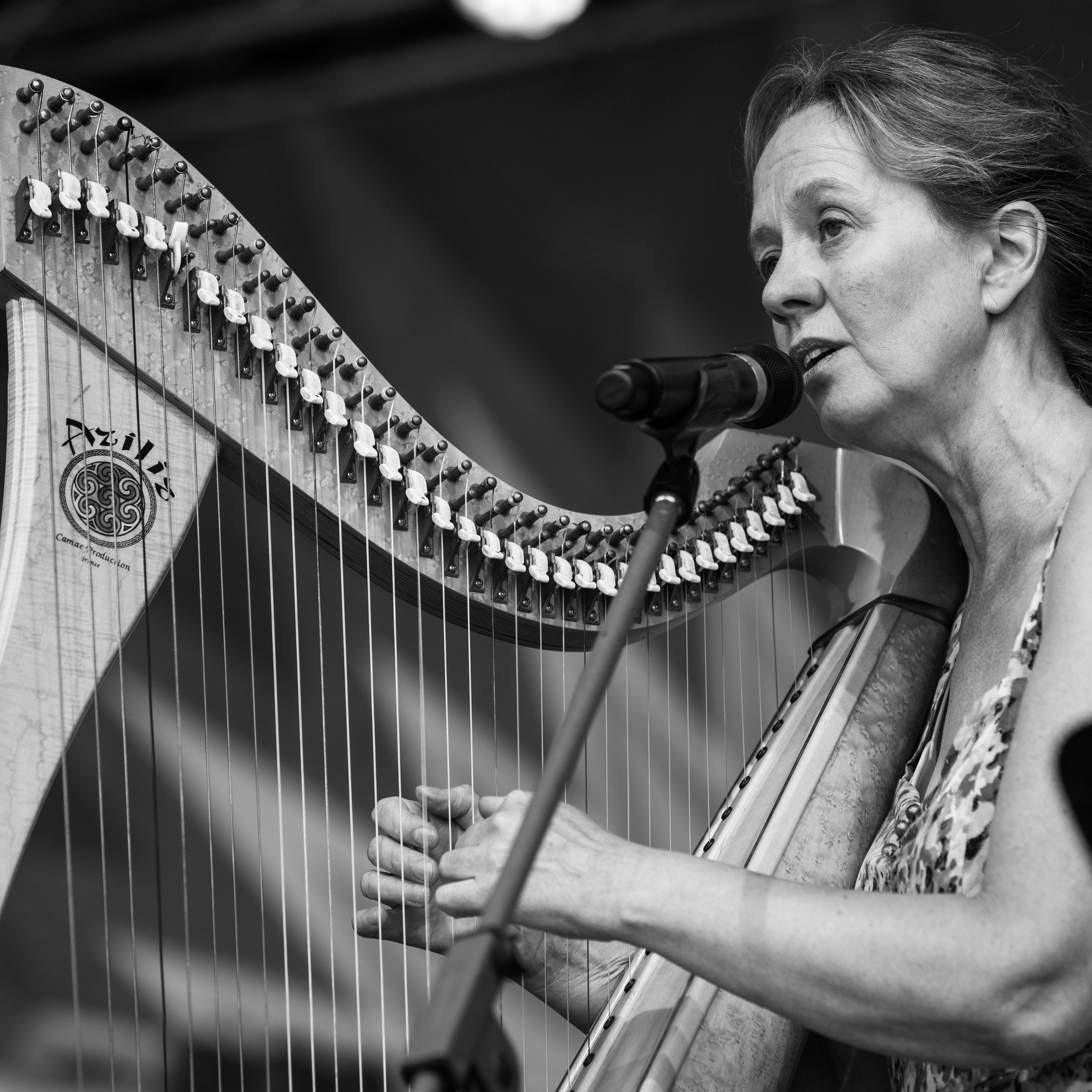
Seddon at the Rudolstadt-Festival 2017

Patsy Seddon is a Scottish harpist, violinist, and traditional singer in Scots and Gaelic.

== Biography ==
Seddon was born in Edinburgh, Scotland. She was a member of leading folk band The Poozies from 1990 until 2012, and the duo Sìleas with Mary Macmaster. She is a former member of Clan Alba and has collaborated with Dougie MacLean, Dick Gaughan, Gerda Stevenson and Karine Polwart. A Kodály-trained music teacher, she teaches harp and singing in Edinburgh schools. As of 2022, she is one of two Artistic Advisors for the Edinburgh International Harp Festival.

Sìleas were inducted into the Scottish Traditional Music Hall of Fame during the 2013 Scots Trad Music Awards.

She has a BA from the University of Edinburgh.

== Personal life ==
Seddon was married to the late Davy Steele of The Battlefield Band.
