= Inge Thomson =

Scottish singer, multi-instrumentalist and producer

Inge Thomson (born 23 October 1974) is a Scottish singer and multi-instrumentalist.

Born in Fair Isle, Shetland, Scotland, she is a founding member of Harem Scarem and plays accordion and percussion in Karine Polwart's band. She has played with groups including the Broken Family Band; she recorded on their albums The King Will Build a Disco, Jesus Songs and Cold Water Songs. She was a longtime member of Shetland band Drop the Box. She also collaborates with folk band Lau; her husband is band member Martin Green.

She released her first solo album, Shipwrecks & Static, in 2010, and her second, Da Fishing Hands, in 2015.

Inge has toured with Kentucky alt-artist Will Oldham 'Bonnie Prince Billy' and made commissioned works for multi-disciplinary artist Bill Drummond

A collaboration with Jenny Sturgeon saw the creation of the cross-arts project Northern Flyway], an ambitious stage show also featuring Jason Singh.

Inge was part of Counterflows artist in residency project Vietnam 2024 where she carried out extensive field recordings culminating in a new body of work 'Two Moons'

Inge is a founding member of Birdvox along with other Northern Flyway contributors, Jenny Sturgeon and Sarah Hayes they are joined by Charlotte Printer on bass.
