= Ruth Keggin =

Manx Gaelic singer-songwriter (born 1989)

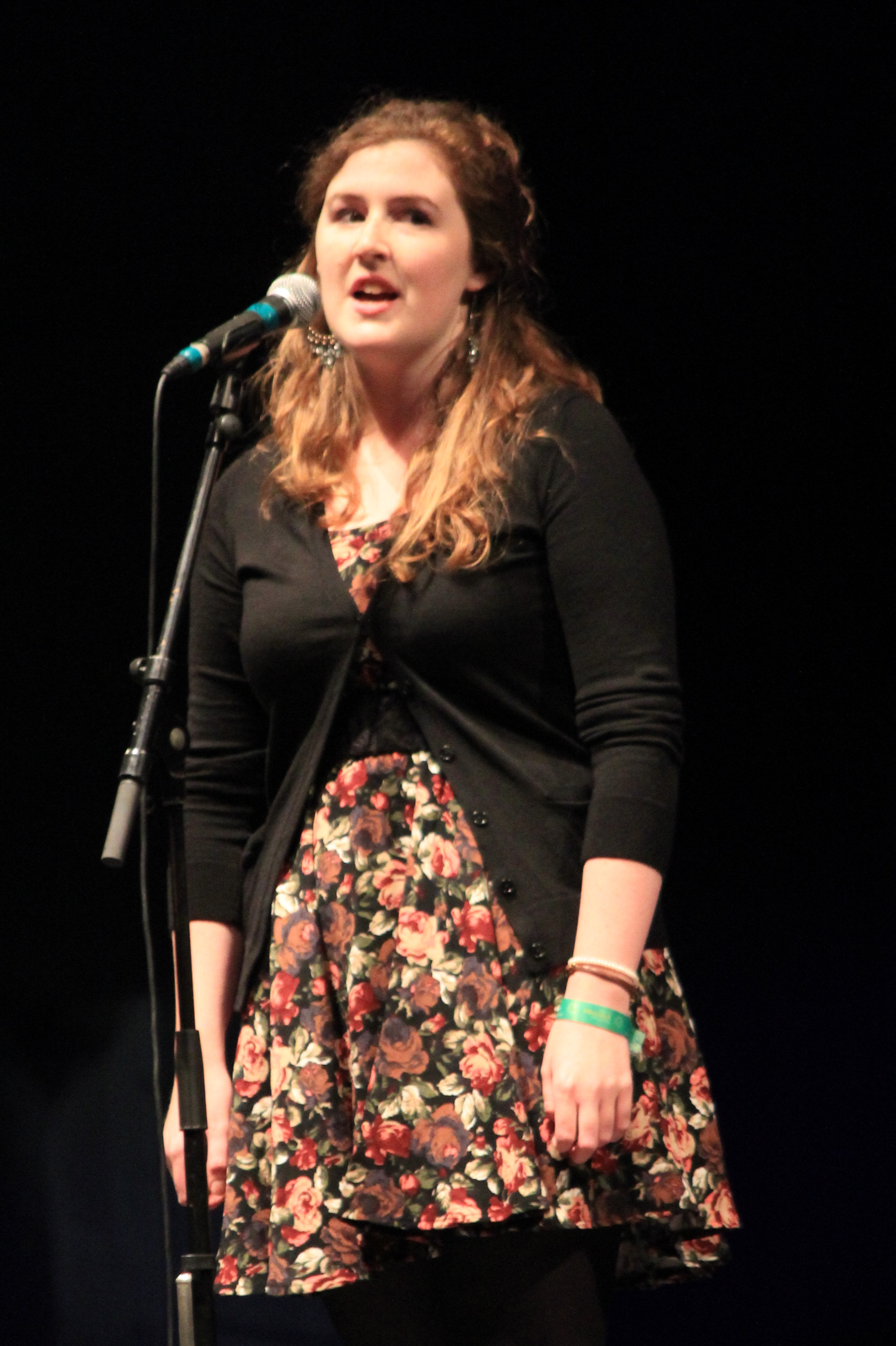
- Ruth Keggin performing with Nish As Rish at the Inter-Celtic Festival of Lorient in 2014

Background information
- Born: 1989 (age 36–37); Port Erin, Isle of Man
- Genres: Folk, Celtic
- Occupation: musician
- Instruments: vocals, piano, flautist, whistle
- Years active: 2011-present
- Label: Purt Sheearan Records
- Website: www.ruthkeggin.com

Ruth Keggin Gell is a Manx Gaelic singer-songwriter.

== Early life and education ==
Keggin was born in Port Erin, Isle of Man. She holds degrees from the University of York and the University of Cambridge.

== Career ==
In 2011, as a member of Nish As Rish, Keggin won in the Best Newcomers category at the 2011 Festival Interceltique de Lorient in Brittany, France.

Keggin was awarded a grant by Culture Vannin to produce her 2014 debut solo album, Sheear ("Westward"), a collection of traditional and contemporary Manx songs praised as "bringing new life into the language with her music." Keggin's album has held popularity in the Celtic genre, becoming album of the week on Celtic Music Radio and listed as number one in Japan’s ‘Top 10’.

Keggin released her second solo album, Turrys ("Journey"), in 2016. Critic Neil McFadyen, writing for the journal Folk Radio UK, praised the album and called her voice "clear, precise and a joy to hear."

In September 2020 Keggin became the Manx Language Development Officer for Culture Vannin, a foundation established by the government of the Isle of Man to promote Manx culture.

In March 2021, Keggin and Scottish harpist Rachel Hair launched a joint crowdfunding campaign to produce a debut duo album to consist primarily of songs in the Manx language. These will include both traditional songs and songs by contemporary Manx musicians. They reached their target goal of £5,000 within 12 hours of launching the campaign and achieved a stretch goal of £10,000 after 48 hours. Some matching funds were provided by Creative Scotland. The album has also received funding from the Isle of Man Arts Council.

== Current and former collaborators ==
- Erlend Apneseth - hardanger fiddle
- Tom Callister - fiddle
- David Kilgallon
- Vanessa McWilliam - double bass
- Margit Myhr - voice, hardanger fiddle
- Eoghan Ó Ceannabháin - Irish flautist and sean-nós singer
- David Pearce - guitar
- Rachel Hair - harp

== Discography ==
Title	Release
Sheear (‘Westward’)	2014
Turrys	2016

== See also ==
- Julie Fowlis, sings in Scottish Gaelic
- Mary Black, sings in Irish
- Gwenno Saunders, sings in Welsh and Cornish
