= Eilidh Shaw =

Scottish fiddle player and singer

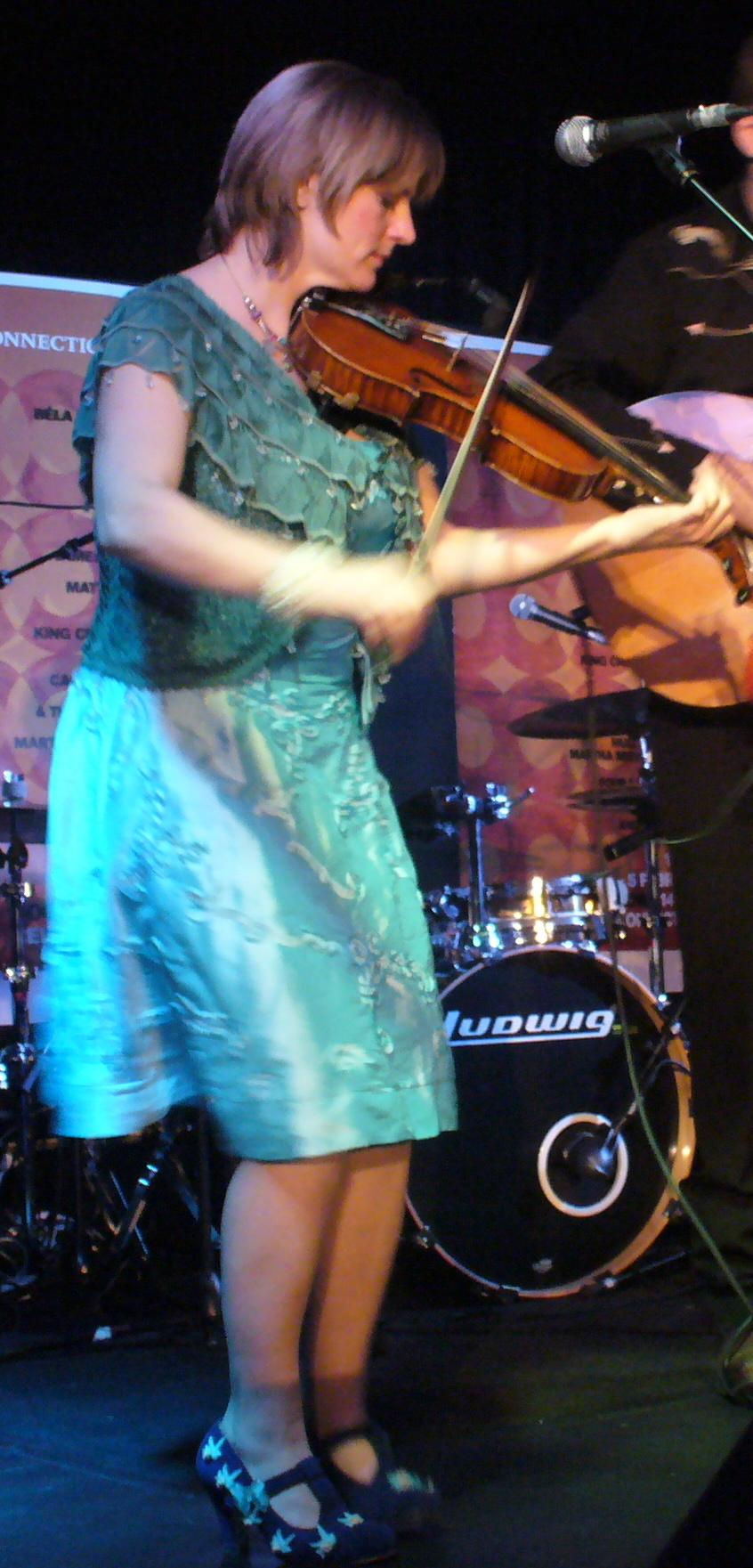
Shaw in 2012

Eilidh Shaw is a Scottish fiddle player and singer. She has performed with The Poozies, Harem Scarem and recorded a solo album, Heepirumbo, in 1997. Her brother Donald Shaw was a founding member of Capercaillie. She and The Poozies performed at 2008's Fèis an Eilein in the Isle of Skye. She joined Shooglenifty in 2018 to replace fiddler Angus R. Grant, who died in 2016.
