= Isobel Mieras =

Scottish folk harpist

- Born: 11 March 1940 (age 85); Edinburgh, Scotland
- Instrument: Clarsach

Isobel Mieras is a Scottish clarsach (Celtic harp) player. She is a member of the Scottish Traditional Music Hall of Fame, and in 2020, she was appointed a Member of the Order of the British Empire "for services to Music in Scotland and to the Revival of the Clarsach."

== Early life and education ==
Mieras was born on 11 March 1940 in Edinburgh, Scotland. She grew up learning many traditional Scottish songs from her mother, a voice teacher. Mieras went on to attend college to become a primary school teacher, and worked throughout school as a singer.

== Professional career ==
Mieras began seriously studying the harp in 1966, taking lessons from Jean Campbell. While still a primary school teacher, Mieras played music for her students and eventually left the classroom in order to teach the harp full-time. She created the harp programs at George Watson's College, St Mary's Music School, and City of Edinburgh Music School. She also taught private lessons to students who went on to become world-renowned harpists, including Catriona McKay, Maeve Gilchrist, Ailie Robertson, and Fiona Rutherford.

Cited as one of the most influential harpists of recent years, Mieras is president of The Clarsach Society, the organization founded in 1931 that is credited with helping spur the revival of the harp in Scotland. She also serves as one of two Artistic Advisors to the annual Edinburgh International Harp Festival.
