= Singing Adams =

British indie rock band

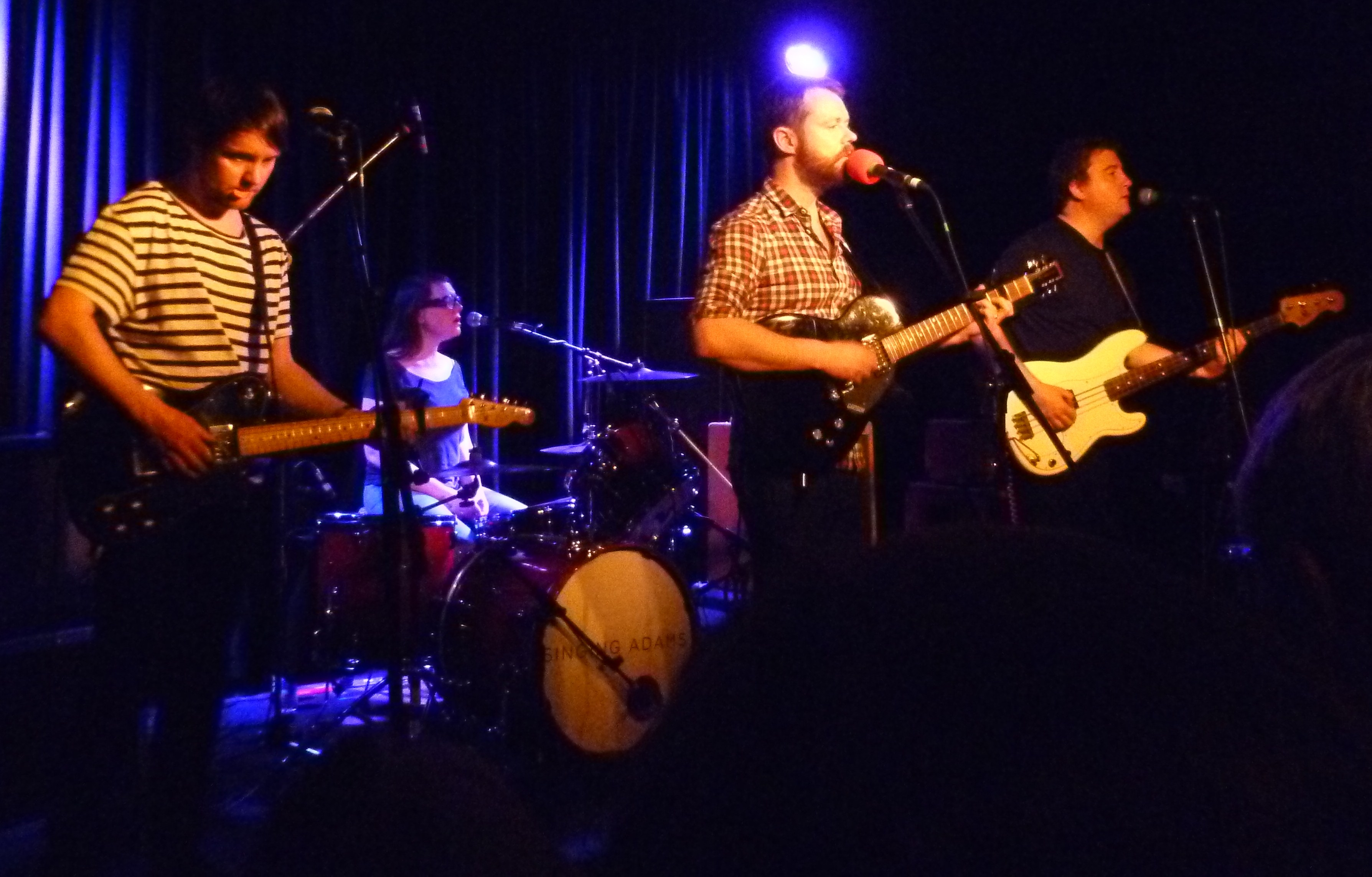
- Singing Adams in 2012.

Background information
- Origin: London, England, UK
- Genres: Indie rock, rock
- Years active: 2010 – present
- Label: Records Records Records records
- Members: Steven Adams; Melinda Bronstein; Matthew Ashton; Michael Wood

Singing Adams is a British indie rock band from London. The band was formed by Steven Adams following the break-up of The Broken Family Band. The band should not be confused with Adams' solo project The Singing Adams, which has a definite article in the title and no full-time band line up. Adams is joined by Matthew Ashton (Saloon, The Leaf Library) on guitar, Melinda Bronstein (Absentee, Wet Paint, The Bronsteins) on drums and Michael Wood (Michaelmas) on bass.

The band released "Everybody Friends Now" in 2011 and follow it with their second album "Moves" in December 2012.

== Discography ==
=== Singles ===
- "I Need Your Mind" – 6 December 2010
- "Bird on the Wing" – 28 March 2011
- "Injured Party" – 19 September 2011
- "Dead End" – 10 December 2012

=== Albums ===
- Everybody Friends Now – 4 April 2011
- Moves – 10 December 2012
