= Mary Macmaster =

Scottish harpist and singer (born 1955)

Mary Macmaster (born 22 November 1955, Glasgow, Scotland) is a Scottish harpist and singer. She performs on the clàrsach and the Camac electroharp, and she sings in English and Gaelic. She has worked with Sting, Kathryn Tickell, Norma Waterson, Donald Hay, the Poozies, and in the duo Sìleas with Patsy Seddon. In 2013, she and Seddon were inducted into the Scottish Traditional Music Hall of Fame.

As an adolescent, Macmaster bought an inexpensive harp that turned out to be wire-strung like the traditional Gaelic clàrsach. Lacking instruction in this older kind of harp, she mostly taught herself how to play it. In 1977, she studied at a Clàrsach Society summer school, and three years later she pursued Celtic studies at the University of Edinburgh. She recorded one album as a member of the band Sprangeen. She graduated in 1985, and with Patsy Seddon, a fellow student who also a member of Sprangeen, she formed the harp duo Sìleas, which was named for the 18th-century Scottish poet Sìleas na Ceapaich. During the same year, she started playing one of the first models of electric harp made by Joël Garnier. Macmaster has been a member of the folk band, The Poozies since 1990, and is the only remaining founder member.

As of 2022, she oversees stage management as part of the team running the Edinburgh International Harp Festival.

== Discography ==
- Sprangeen - (Springthyme SPR 1013 - 1984)
- Clan Alba - 1995
- Sugar Cane - with Shine - 2001
- Bright Shiny Morning - with Norma Waterson - 2000
- La Boum! Marionette (compilation album) - 2005
- Cold Blow These Winter Winds - (compilation album) - 2006
- Kathryn Tickell & Ensemble Mystical
- Songs of Separation - with Songs of Separation - (2016)

With Sìleas

- Delighted with Harps (Lapwing, 1986)
- Beating Harps (Green Linnet Records SIF 1089 - 1987)
- Harpbreakers (Lapwing Records LAP 127 - 1990)
- Play on Light (1996)

With The Poozies

- Dansoozies (1993)
- Chantoozies (1995)
- Come Raise Your Head (1997)
- Infinite Blue (1998)
- Raise Your Head: A Retrospective (2000)
- Changed Days Same Roots (2003)
- Yellow Like Sunshine (2009)
- Into the Well (2015)
- Punch (2018)

With Donald Hay

- Love and Reason (2009)
- Hook (2012)

As guest

- If on a Winter's Night..., Sting (2009)
