= Jermain Jackman =

British singer and political activist (born 1995)

- Born: 10 January 1995 (age 31); Hackney, London, England
- Years active: 2014–present
- Political party: Labour
- Musical career
- Genres: Pop; R&B
- Label: Will.i.am Music Group

Jermain Jackman (born 10 January 1995) is a British singer and political activist. He won the third series of the BBC television singing competition The Voice UK in 2014. His self-titled debut album, Jermain Jackman, was released on 23 March 2015. He was twice a candidate for the Labour Party National Executive Committee (NEC) in 2020. Jackman is a member of the Musicians' Union and Unite.

== Early life and education ==
Jackman was born in Hackney, London, to an Afro-Guyanese family. He has four older siblings and a twin sister. His eldest sibling, Orlan Jackman, is a basketball player and Commonwealth Games gold medallist. He attended the Islington Arts and Media School in Finsbury Park and Sir George Monoux College in Walthamstow, where he studied music. He later read Politics at the University of Leeds. He graduated from SOAS University of London in 2022.

== Music and television ==
=== 2014: The Voice UK ===
In April 2014, Jackman won series three of The Voice UK, becoming the first male contestant to win the competition. He defeated finalist Christina Marie. Following his victory, he received a £100,000 recording contract. His cover of "And I Am Telling You I'm Not Going" reached number 75 on the UK Singles Chart.

=== 2014–present: Recording career and media appearances ===
In December 2014, Jackman released the collaborative EP Jermain Jackman Sessions as a free download.

His debut studio album, Jermain Jackman, was issued on 23 March 2015. The lead single, "How Will I Know", was released the same day.

In 2015, he appeared as a panellist on CBBC's The Dog Ate My Homework. He later returned to The Voice UK to perform "How Will I Know" during the first live show of the 2015 series, alongside Olly Murs, who performed "Seasons".

In November 2017, Jackman and George Sampson won the jackpot on an episode of Pointless Celebrities.

== Politics and activism ==
Jackman has stated that he would like to become the first singing Prime Minister of the United Kingdom. In 2016, he said that he had been encouraged by Jeremy Corbyn after being seen performing at a school talent show in 2006, which influenced his decision to pursue politics.

In June 2017, he supported a Labour Party rally ahead of the 2017 United Kingdom general election.

Jackman chaired the Islington Fair Futures Commission from 2017 to 2018 and has chaired the Hackney Young Futures Commission since 2019. He has served as a youth adviser for the NCS Trust since 2019. In April 2020, he founded the 1987 Caucus, an organisation for young Black men in Labour, and is a member of Socialists of Colour.

In February 2020, Jackman announced his candidacy to succeed Keith Vaz as BAME Representative on the Labour Party National Executive Committee. He finished third in the subsequent by-election, receiving 10.66 per cent of the vote.

In July 2020, he announced a further candidacy for the NEC, initially seeking election as Youth Representative before standing instead for a Constituency Labour Party (CLP) Representative seat. His campaign was endorsed by Open Labour. He finished eleventh in the ballot for nine CLP seats.

In 2022, Jackman sought to challenge Carol Sewell for the BAME Representative position but later withdrew from the contest, citing concerns about internal party processes.

== Discography ==
=== Albums ===
Title	Details	Peak chart positions UK
Jermain Jackman	Released: 23 March 2015; Label: will.i.am, Universal Republic, Polydor; Formats: Digital download, CD	42

=== Extended plays ===
Title	Details
Jermain Jackman Sessions EP	Released: December 2014; Label: Universal Republic, London Records; Format: Free download

=== Singles ===
Year	Title	Peak chart positions UK	Album
2014	"And I Am Telling You"	75	—N/a
2015	"How Will I Know"	—	Jermain Jackman
