= Welcome Home, Loser =

Studio album by The Broken Family Band
- Released: 2005
- Label: Track & Field
- Producer: Owen Turner

The Broken Family Band chronology
Cold Water Songs (2003)	Welcome Home, Loser (2005)	Balls (2006)

Professional ratings
Review scores
Source	Rating
AllMusic	3.5/5 stars
XFM	Favourable

Welcome Home, Loser is the second full-length album by British group The Broken Family Band. It was released in 2005 by the Track & Field Organisation.

== Track listing ==
1. Happy Days Are Here Again – 2:54
2. Living in Sin – 3:10
3. O Princess – 3:15
4. Where the Hell Is My Baby? – 3:43
5. Yer Little Bedroom – 5:19
6. John Belushi (Adams, Williams) – 4:18
7. Cocktail Lounge – 3:10
8. Honest Man's Blues – 2:08
9. We Already Said Goodbye – 3:43
10. A Place You Deserve (Adams) – 3:32
11. Roman Johnson One (Johnson, Roman) – 0:36
12. The Last Song – 3:43
13. Wherever You Go – 3:12
14. Coping with Fear (Adams, Williams) – 6:00

All songs written by Adams/Broken Family Band, except where noted

== Credits ==
- Steven Adams – guitar, vocals
- Gavin Johnson – bass guitar
- Micky Roman – drums
- Jay Williams – guitar
- Timothy Victor – banjo, vocals
- Owen, Stacy and Andrew
