= Everybody Friends Now =

Studio album by Singing Adams
- Released: 4 April 2011
- Genre: Indie, pop
- Length: 44:47
- Label: Records Records Records records

Singing Adams chronology
Everybody Friends Now (2011)	Moves (2012)

Professional ratings
Review scores
Source	Rating
"BBC"	Positive link
"The Guardian"	link
Drowned In Sound	link
Music OMH	link

Everybody Friends Now is the debut album by Singing Adams and was released by London indie label Records Records Records records in 2011.

== Track listing ==
No.	Title	Writer(s)	Length
1.	"Move On"	Steven Adams, Matthew Ashton, Melinda Bronstein, Michael Wood	3:24
2.	"I Need Your Mind"	Steven Adams, Matthew Ashton, Melinda Bronstein, Michael Wood	4:47
3.	"Bird On The Wing"	Steven Adams, Matthew Ashton, Melinda Bronstein, Michael Wood	4:09
4.	"The Old Days"	Steven Adams, Matthew Ashton, Melinda Bronstein, Michael Wood	5:04
5.	"Injured Party"	Steven Adams, Matthew Ashton, Melinda Bronstein, Michael Wood	4:04
6.	"Giving It All Away"	Steven Adams, Matthew Ashton, Melinda Bronstein, Michael Wood	3:17
7.	"Red Carpet"	Steven Adams, Matthew Ashton, Melinda Bronstein, Michael Wood	4:09
8.	"Sit And Wait"	Steven Adams, Matthew Ashton, Melinda Bronstein, Michael Wood	4:14
9.	"Spit In The Sea"	Steven Adams, Matthew Ashton, Melinda Bronstein, Michael Wood	2:44
10.	"Elisabeth Frink"	Steven Adams, Matthew Ashton, Melinda Bronstein, Michael Wood	4:10
11.	"Married Woman"	Steven Adams	4:21
Total length:			44:55
