= Sìleas =

Scottish harp duo

Sìleas (pronounced sheelis) is a Scottish harp duo. Patsy Seddon plays electric harp and gut-strung harp, and Mary Macmaster plays electric harp and metal-strung harp. They sing in Gaelic and English.

The name of the band is explained on the back cover of the debut album, Delighted with Harps. Sìleas na Ceapaich was an 18th-century Gaelic poet. Her praise of harp music led Seddon and Macmaster to take "Sìleas" as their professional name.

They were inducted into the Scottish Traditional Music Hall of Fame in 2013.

== Discography ==
- Delighted with Harps (Lapwing, 1986 )
- Beating Harps (Green Linnet, 1987)
- Harpbreakers (1990)
- File Under Christmas (1991)
- Play on Light (1996)
