= The Go! Team discography =

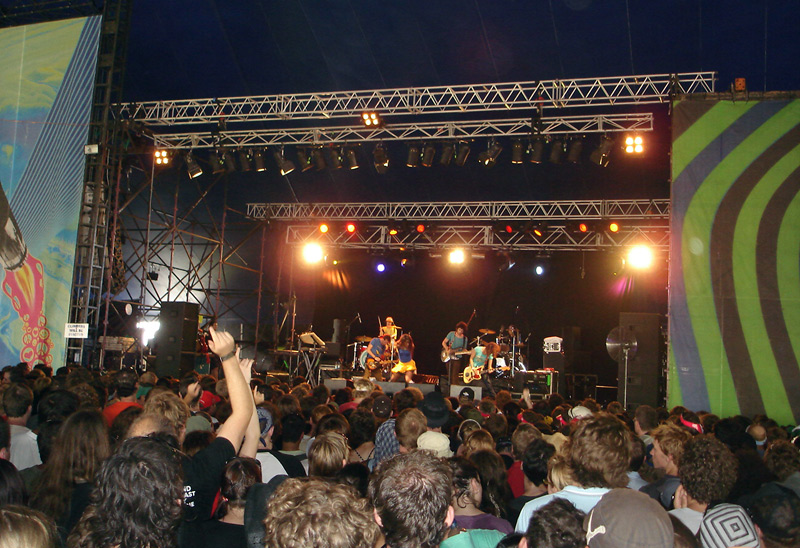
- The Go! Team performing at Big Day Out in 2006
- Studio albums: 7
- EPs: 5
- Singles: 13
- Music videos: 20

The discography of British indie rock band The Go! Team consists of six studio albums, five extended plays, thirteen singles and twenty music videos.

== Studio albums ==
List of studio albums, with selected chart positions and certifications
| Title | Album details | Peak chart positions | | | | | | | | | | Certifications |
| Title | Album details | UK | UK Indie | AUS | FRA | IRL | JPN | SCO | US | US Indie | US Rock | Certifications |
|---|---|---|---|---|---|---|---|---|---|---|---|---|
| Thunder, Lightning, Strike | Released: 13 September 2004 (UK); Label: Memphis Industries; Formats: CD, LP, digital download | 48 | 5 | — | — | — | — | 40 | — | — | — | BPI: Gold |
| Proof of Youth | Released: 10 September 2007 (UK); Label: Memphis Industries; Formats: CD, LP, digital download | 21 | 1 | 75 | 95 | 24 | 79 | 21 | 142 | 19 | — | |
| Rolling Blackouts | Released: 31 January 2011 (UK); Label: Memphis Industries; Formats: CD, LP, digital download | 50 | 5 | — | — | 59 | 84 | 44 | 162 | 18 | 33 | |
| The Scene Between | Released: 24 March 2015 (UK); Label: Memphis Industries; Format: CD, LP, digital download | 91 | 12 | — | — | — | 193 | 71 | — (Note: The Scene Between did not enter the US Billboard 200, but peaked at number 23 on the Heatseekers Albums chart.) | — | — | |
| Semicircle | Released: 19 January 2018 (UK); Label: Memphis Industries; Format: CD, LP, digital download, Cassette | 39 | 4 | — | — | — | — | 33 | — (Note: Semicircle did not enter the US Billboard 200, but peaked at number 24 on the Heatseekers Albums chart.) | — | — | |
| Get Up Sequences Part One | Released: 2 July 2021 (UK); Label: Memphis Industries; Format: CD, LP, digital download, streaming, Cassette | 93 | 4 | — | — | — | — | 12 | — | — | — | |
| Get Up Sequences Part Two | Released: 3 February 2023 (UK); Label: Memphis Industries; Format: CD, LP, digital download, streaming, Cassette | — (Note: Get Up Sequences Part Two did not enter the UK Albums Chart, but peaked at number 17 on the UK Album Sales Chart.) | 7 | — | — | — | — | 27 | — | — | — | |
"—" denotes a recording that did not chart or was not released in that territory.

== Extended plays ==
List of extended plays
| Title | EP details |
|---|---|
| Get It Together | Released: 28 August 2000 (UK); Label: Pickled Egg; Formats: 7" |
| Are You Ready for More? | Released: 8 August 2005 (AUS); Label: Memphis Industries; Formats: CD |
| Audio Assault Course | Released: 2006 (US); Label: Columbia; Formats: CD |
| Live at Lollapalooza 2006 | Released: 12 September 2006 (UK); Label: Memphis Industries; Formats: Digital download |
| Live at Lollapalooza 2008 | Released: 16 September 2008 (UK); Label: Memphis Industries; Formats: Digital download |

== Singles ==
List of singles, with selected chart positions, showing year released and album name
| Title | Year | Peak chart positions | | | | | | Album |
| Title | Year | UK | UK Indie | IRL | JPN | Tokio Hot 100 | SCO | Album |
|---|---|---|---|---|---|---|---|---|
| "Junior Kickstart" | 2003 | 103 | 23 | — | — | — | — | Thunder, Lightning, Strike! |
| "The Power Is On" | 2004 | — | — | — | — | — | — | Thunder, Lightning, Strike! |
| "Ladyflash" | 2004 | 26 | 4 | 37 | — | 37 | 25 | Thunder, Lightning, Strike! |
| "Bottle Rocket" | 2004 | 64 | 11 | — | — | — | 54 | Thunder, Lightning, Strike! |
| "Grip Like a Vice" | 2007 | 57 | 2 | — | — | — | 20 | Proof of Youth |
| "Doing It Right" | 2007 | 55 | 3 | — | — | 30 | 25 | Proof of Youth |
| "The Wrath of Marcie" | 2007 | — (Note: "The Wrath of Marcie" did not enter the UK Singles Chart, but peaked at number 68 on the UK Physical Singles Chart.) | 10 | — | — | — | 68 | Proof of Youth |
| "Milk Crisis" | 2008 | — | — | — | — | — | — | Proof of Youth |
| "Buy Nothing Day" | 2011 | — (Note: "Buy Nothing Day" did not enter the UK Singles Chart, but peaked at number 16 on the UK Physical Singles Chart.) | — | — | — | — | — | Rolling Blackouts |
| "Apollo Throwdown" | 2011 | — | — | — | — | — | — | Rolling Blackouts |
| "Ready to Go Steady" | 2011 | — | — | — | — | — | — | Rolling Blackouts |
| "T.O.R.N.A.D.O." | 2013 | — | — | — | 87 | 32 | — | Rolling Blackouts |
| "The Scene Between" | 2015 | — | — | — | — | 71 | — | The Scene Between |
| "Blowtorch" | 2015 | — | — | — | — | — | — | The Scene Between |
| "What D'You Say?" | 2015 | — | — | — | — | — | — | The Scene Between |
| "Ye Ye Yamaha" | 2015 | — (Note: "Ye Ye Yamaha" did not enter the UK Singles Chart, but peaked at number 79 on the UK Physical Singles Chart.) | — | — | — | — | — | Non-album single |
| "All the Way Live" | 2018 | — | — | — | — | 36 | — | Semicircle |
| "Cookie Scene" | 2020 | — (Note: "Cookie Scene" did not enter the UK Singles Chart, but peaked at number 8 on the UK Physical Singles Chart.) | — | — | — | — | — | Get Up Sequences Part One |
"—" denotes a recording that did not chart or was not released in that territory.

== Other appearances ==
List of guest appearances, showing year released and album name
| Title | Year | Album |
|---|---|---|
| Untitled | 2002 | Robots and Electronic Brains: 16k, 48k, 128k, Go! |
| "Phantom Broadcast" | 2005 | Help! A Day in the Life |
| "Templates from Home" | 2008 | Songs for Survival |

== Music videos ==
List of music videos, showing year released and director
| Title | Year | Director(s) |
|---|---|---|
| "Ladyflash" (version 1) | 2004 | Ian Parton |
| "Bottle Rocket" | 2004 | Ian Parton |
| "Ladyflash" (version 2) | 2005 | Good Times |
| "Junior Kickstart" | 2007 | Doug Schachtel |
| "Grip Like a Vice" | 2007 | James Slater |
| "Doing It Right" | 2007 | Good Times |
| "My World" | 2007 | Bob Jaroc |
| "Keys to the City" | 2007 | Bob Jaroc |
| "The Wrath of Marcie" | 2007 | Bob Jaroc |
| "Milk Crisis" | 2008 | Daniel Garcia |
| "Fake ID" | 2008 | Bob Jaroc |
| "T.O.R.N.A.D.O." | 2010 | James Slater |
| "Secretary Song" | 2011 | James Slater |
| "Buy Nothing Day" | 2011 | James Slater |
| "Rolling Blackouts" | 2011 | James Slater |
| "Super Triangle" | 2011 | James Slater |
| "Ready to Go Steady" | 2011 | James Slater |
| "Apollo Throwdown" | 2011 | James Slater |
| "Voice Yr Choice" | 2011 | James Slater |
