= Bottle rocket (disambiguation) =

A bottle rocket is a small skyrocket firework.

Bottle rocket or bottle rockets may also refer to:

- Bottle Rocket, a 1996 film
  - Bottle Rocket (soundtrack), the soundtrack to that film
- Bottle Rocket (album), by Guardian
- Bottle rocket (model), a type of model rocket using water as its reaction mass
- "Bottle Rocket" (single), a 2005 single by The Go! Team
- "Bottle Rockets", a song by Scotty McCreery featuring Hootie & the Blowfish
- The Bottle Rockets, an alt-country music group
- Bottlerocket Entertainment, a video game developer
- Bottle Rocket (company), a now defunct developer of Web-based casual games and advergames from 1996 until 2000
- Water rockets
