= The Scene Between =

Studio album by the Go! Team
- Released: 24 March 2015
- Genres: Indie pop; noise pop; lo-fi
- Length: 37:12
- Label: Memphis Industries
- Producer: Ian Parton

The Go! Team chronology
Rolling Blackouts (2011)	The Scene Between (2015)	Semicircle (2018)

Singles from The Scene Between
- 1. "The Scene Between" Released: 7 January 2015; 2. "Blowtorch" Released: 3 February 2015; 3. "What D'You Say?" Released: 25 February 2015

Professional ratings
Aggregate scores
Source	Rating
AnyDecentMusic?	6.8/10
Metacritic	75/100
Review scores
Source	Rating
AllMusic	4.5/5 stars
The A.V. Club	A−
The Guardian	4/5 stars
Mojo	4/5 stars
NME	7/10
Pitchfork	7.2/10
Q	4/5 stars
Rolling Stone	2.5/5 stars
Spin	8/10
Vice	A−

The Scene Between is the fourth studio album by English band the Go! Team. It was released on 24 March 2015 by Memphis Industries. The album was written and produced by leader Ian Parton after the band was officially dissolved after the promotion of their 2011 album Rolling Blackouts. Vocalists on the album include Emily Reo, Samira Winter, Casey Sowa, Atom, Doreen Kirchner, Glockabelle, The London African Gospel Choir and an Atlantan vocal trio.

== Background ==
Following the band's 2011-12 tour in support of their third album Rolling Blackouts, the then-current line-up decided to split. Says frontman Ian Parton, “We had a band meeting after that gig, and kind of decided it was the end of the line. [...] It was getting really hard to keep it together; people were having kids, there were side projects going on, and honestly, we’d kind of done everything that we wanted to. I knew I was going to keep on making music somehow, and it was kind of liberating to know that I could basically do what I wanted.” The demise of the band's classic line-up included the departure of lead vocalist Ninja, who Parton described as the "face of the band".

== Recording ==
The line-up's split inspired Parton to go back to the band's roots - similar to the production of the band's debut, Thunder, Lightning, Strike, the album was entirely written and produced by him, excluding the vocals. Says Parton, “I started the band myself, and did the first album alone, so I felt like I had the right to keep calling it The Go! Team. [...] Even on the last two records, I’d still written them, musically speaking, from start to finish, but The Scene Between is the first time I’ve gone right back to how things started. [...] I’ve always been the one who’s been arsed to listen to thousands of records, pluck some samples, and write songs around them.”

The album was a departure from the group's previous two albums, which were more band-oriented and groove-based. Parton instead decided to make a more straightforward, sample-based album with an emphasis on vocal melodies, saying “The original plan was to write a whole bunch of songs that I thought were melodically interesting - kind of curvy, kind of dense. From there, I was going to try to build the songs out of chords I’d taken from loads of different places; I’d get the G from a sixties psych record, or the B from an old funk track, or something. I was really into the idea of building it up. To some extent, I’ve always worked that way, but I wanted to pursue that properly this time, and it actually turned out a lot more subtle than I thought it would. It’s like a balance between everything I’ve always loved, musically. [...] I guess I’m just always interested in melodies, and the classic idea of the pop song, like The Monkees or something. I think The Scene Between picks up where songs like ‘Ready to Go Steady’ and ‘Buy Nothing Day’ left off on the last album, because there’s expansion and variation within an identifiable Go! Team blueprint.”

Parton expresses how he wished to avoid having any high-profile guest appearances on the album, as opposed to their previous two albums, which featured Chuck D (‘Flashlight Fight’ on Proof of Youth) and Bethany Cosentino (‘Buy Nothing Day’ and ‘Rolling Blackouts’ on Rolling Blackouts). “I figured that the last two records were getting overshadowed, at points, by namedroppy features. [...] [It] almost become the story of the album, and I wanted the songs to stand alone this time,” he says. Instead, he chose to scout out a collective of relatively unknown vocalists, a process which included putting out open calls on the Drowned in Sound message board. Says Parton, “It just involved a lot of scouring the world. [...] I listened to a hell of a lot of different bands, mainly obscure ones. [...] I was looking for something bordering on amateurishness. [...] I knew some songs had to be quite full-on and bratty, and others needed to be smoother, or have a little bit of an accent on them. I was open to how it would ultimately turn out, but I had a vague idea of what I was gunning for. Take a song like ‘Did You Know?’; because that’s a slower one, I knew that a straightforward vocal might be too sickly, or too cute, and that I’d need to take the edge off it. I needed to kind of Moe Tucker-ify it.”

== Release ==
The album was released on label Memphis Industries on 24 March 2015. The band went on a tour to support the album, which notably included the return of classic line-up members Ninja and guitarist Sam Dook. Says Parton, “A live show without [Ninja] would be a complete different ball game, so I’m glad we’ve got her; I know she loves doing it. We want to get to Japan and America, and do as much as we realistically can.”

Between the Scene Between, a free cassette with download card, was given with copies of the album at independent record shops. It is a two-track release containing excerpts of songs from The Scene Between mixed together.

== Track listing ==
All tracks are written by Ian Parton.

No.	Title	Length
1.	"What D'You Say?"	4:13
2.	"The Scene Between"	3:48
3.	"Waking the Jetstream"	4:03
4.	"Rolodex the Seasons"	0:58
5.	"Blowtorch"	3:28
6.	"Did You Know?"	4:50
7.	"Gaffa Tape Bikini"	0:43
8.	"Catch Me on the Rebound"	2:52
9.	"The Floating Felt Tip"	0:52
10.	"Her Last Wave"	3:52
11.	"The Art of Getting By (Song for Heaven's Gate)"	3:46
12.	"Reason Left to Destroy"	3:47

Between the Scene Between
No.	Title	Length
1.	"Cassette Mix 2-01"	8:53
2.	"Cassette Mix 2-02"	10:32

== Personnel ==
Credits for The Scene Between adapted from album liner notes.

The Go! Team

- Jamie Bell
- Sam Dook
- Rob Jones
- Ian Parton

Additional musicians

- Samira Winter – vocals on "What D'You Say?"
- The London African Gospel Choir – vocals on "The Scene Between" and "The Art of Getting By (Song for Heaven's Gate)"
- Casey Sowa – vocals on "Waking the Jetstream"
- Doreen Kirchner – vocals on "Blowtorch" and "Reason Left to Destroy"
- Shi Lu (Atom) – vocals on "Did You Know?"
- Annabelle Cazes – vocals on "Catch Me on the Rebound"
- Emily Reo – vocals on "Her Last Wave" and "Reason Left to Destroy"

Production

- Gareth Parton – mixing
- Ian Parton – production
- Streaky – mastering
- Sam Williams – mixing

Artwork and design

- Mark Jessett – artwork
- Christian Pinchbeck – design

== Charts ==
Chart (2015)	Peak position
Japanese Albums (Oricon)	193
Scottish Albums (Official Charts)	71
UK Albums (Official Charts)	91
UK Independent Albums (Official Charts)	12
