= Nitty Scott =

American rapper (born 1990)

- Also known as: Nitty Scott, MC
- Born: Nitzia Cecilia Scott; October 10, 1990 (age 35); Grand Rapids, Michigan, U.S.
- Origin: Orlando, Florida, U.S.
- Genres: Hip hop; underground hip hop; spoken word
- Occupations: Rapper; poet
- Years active: 2004–present
- Member of: No Panty

Nitzia Cecilia Scott (born October 10, 1990), known professionally as Nitty Scott (formerly known as Nitty Scott, MC), is an American rapper and spoken word poet. Raised in Orlando, Florida, she rose to prominence through her freestyle over Kanye West's single "Monster" (2010). She has released three studio albums, which have received praise from music critics, and performed at the BET Hip Hop Awards and Brooklyn Hip-Hop Festival. In 2016 she formed the group No Panty, with Bodega Bamz and Joell Ortiz, and released the mixtape Westside Highway Story, produced by Salaam Remi.

== Biography ==
Scott was born in Michigan and raised in Orlando, Florida. Her mother is Puerto Rican and her father is African American from New Orleans.

Scott started rapping at the age of 14, while she was attending art school with a major in creative writing. She found writing to be an effective form of personal expression and was creating poetry before transitioning to become a musician.

She graduated from the Secondary School for Journalism at John Jay High School in Park Slope, Brooklyn. In an interview with MSN, she stated that if she hadn't pursued a career as a musician, she would have attended college to study Journalism and Broadcast Communications.

== Career ==
At the age of 17, Scott moved to Brooklyn, New York to pursue a career as a rapper. While in New York, Scott created the Boombox Family hip-hop movement to "preserve and progress hip-hop culture". Due to internal changes, Nitty dissolved the Boombox Family label in 2014 and began other independent business ventures.

In 2011, she performed at the BET Hip Hop Awards participating in one of several cyphers among DJ Premier, Estelle and Lecrae. She was also part of the 2011 Brooklyn Hip Hop Festival lineup, headlined by Q-Tip. In 2012, Scott performed at the Royal Arena Festival in Switzerland among Ice Cube and Mos Def.

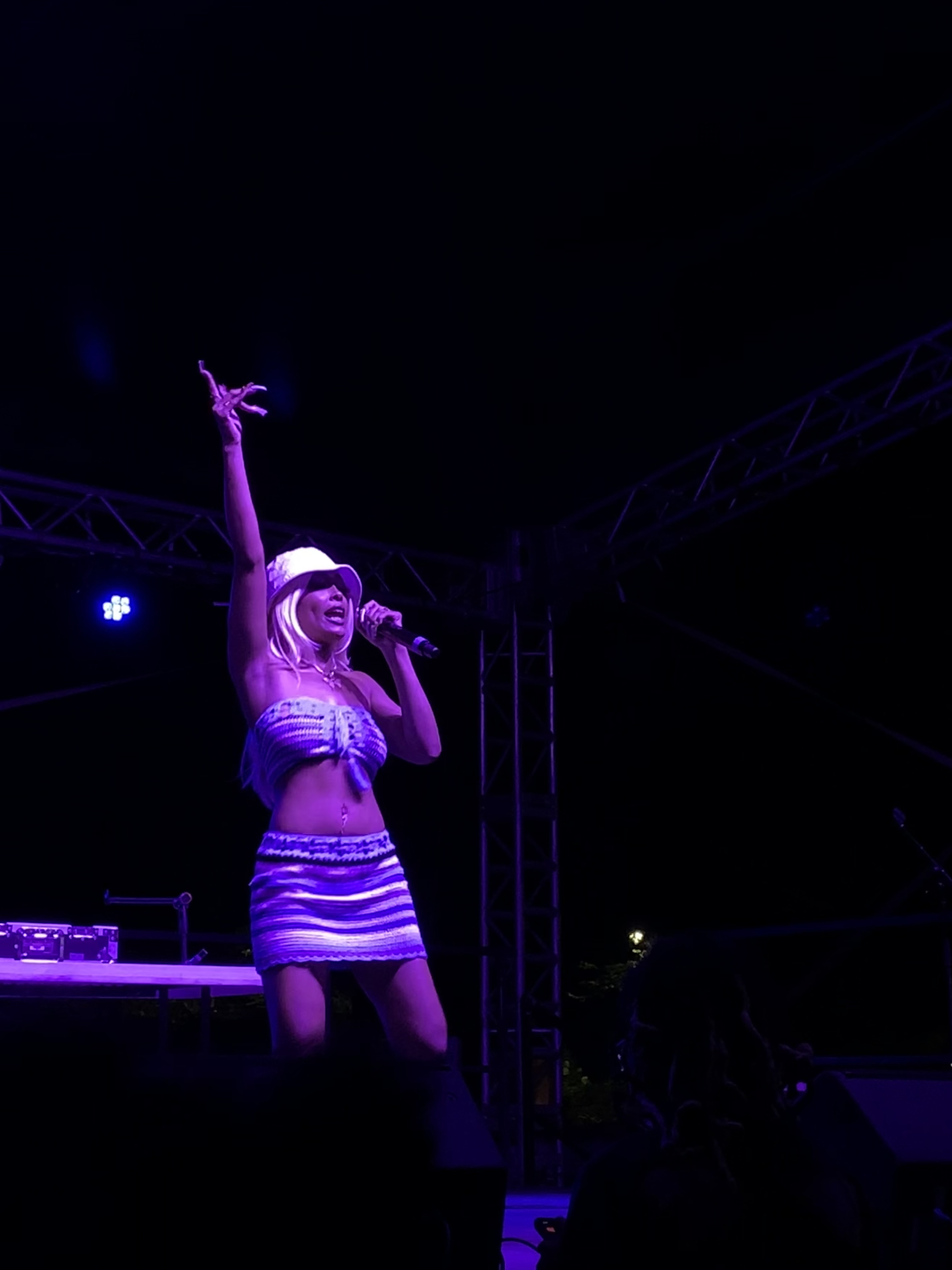
Nitty Scott performing live in Cincinnati, Ohio in 2021

Scott released her first official EP The Boombox Diaries, Vol. 1 on August 28, 2012. The record features production from 6th Sense, AraabMuzik, Cassius Clay, DJ Tedsmooth, !llmind and J57, and has guest appearances by Kendrick Lamar, Action Bronson and The Kid Daytona, among others. It was supported by the lead single "Auntie Maria's Crib". The EP received the Editor's Pick at DJ Booth. In a positive review, Nick De Molina of XXL gave it an XL rating, describing Nitty as a "conscious rapper" and praised the production as "strong and diverse".

On June 16, 2013, Scott released her video for the song "Flower Child" featuring Kendrick Lamar on MTV Jams. The video shoot was completely funded through the support of fans and contributors to her Kickstarter campaign. On May 23, 2014, Scott released her debut album The Art of Chill.

In 2017, Scott released her second full length album, Creature!

In 2021, Scott released her third album, Jiggy Mami.

On September 18, 2021, Scott performed at Miami Beach Pride.

On September 25, 2021, Scott performed live in Cincinnati, Ohio for the second annual “In Her Voice” community music event hosted by Queens Village and Underworld Jazz Festival where she opened for Sa-Roc.

Scott featured on The Go! Team's 2022 single "Whammy-O," also a track on their 2023 album Get Up Sequences Part Two.

== Musical style and influences ==
Scott's rapping style has been compared to that of MC Lyte, Lauryn Hill, Ladybug Mecca, and Big Pun. She has stated that she is influenced by the Wu-Tang Clan, A Tribe Called Quest and Slum Village, among others. In Creature!, Scott explores her Afro-Boricua identity through sonic references to Afro-Caribbean musical cultures; tracks on the album include collaborations with Taíno artists, recordings of indigenous coquí frogs, and tumba drums, all meant to evoke a pre-colonial past.

== Discography ==
=== Solo albums ===
Title	Album details
The Art of Chill	Released: May 23, 2014; Genres: Jazz rap, Underground hip hop; Length: 47:20; Labels: Nitty Scott; Track listing: 1. "Wanderlust (Intro)" - 1:01; 2. "Generation Now (Psychedelic Little Buddha)" - 3:08; 3. "Apex" - 3:22; 4. "Feng Shui" - 4:51; 5. "Princess Celestia (Interlude)" - 0:36; 6. "Lily of the Valley" - 3:54; 7. "Gone Girl" - 3:25; 8. "The Unlearning" - 3:46; 9. "Knowbody Knows" - 3:28; 10. "U.F.O. (Unfiltered Offering)" - 4:00; 11. "Pyrexxx Pink" - 2:36; 12. "Return to Indigo (Interlude) - 0:31; 13. "Little Sister" - 4:36; 14. "Still I Rise" - 3:49; 15. "Afterglow (Outro)" - 4:17
CREATURE!	Released: July 21, 2017; Genres: Hip-Hop/Rap; Length: 32:07; Labels: Indigenous Digital; Track listing: 1. "Coquí Song"; 2. "La Diaspora"; 3. "Creature!"; 4. "Pxssy Powah!"; 5. "Negrita" - 0:36; 6. "PinkPalmTrees"; 7. "For Sarah Baartman"; 8. "Write!"; 9. "In The Water"; 10. "Don't Shoot!"; 11. "Kaleidoscopes!"; 12. "Indígena"; 13. "Mango Nectar"
Jiggy Mami	Released: 2021; Genres: Hip-Hop/Rap; Length: 31:50; Labels: Indigenous Digital; Track listing: 1. "Mami Universe"; 2. "BLACKARITA"; 3. "Jiggy Mami (ft. Mya)"; 4. "Bag Lady 2.0"; 5. "Get Twisted"; 6. "$pace Cowgirl"; 7. "Thought It Was"; 8. "The Frightening Parts"; 9. "Wilkinson County Wildcats"; 10. "Broken Savior"; 11. "I'm Sawwy"; 12. "Hereditary"

=== Collaborative albums ===
Title	Album details
Westside Highway Story (with Salaam Remi, Joell Ortiz and Bodega Bamz as No Panty)	Released: September 30, 2016; Genres: Underground hip hop; Length: 49:27; Labels: Louder Than Life LLC; Track listing: 1. "Hola" - 5:19; 2. "Singin My Song" - 4:12; 3. "Spanish Fly" - 2:54; 4. "Westside Highway Story" - 4:39; 5. "Icey's on Deck" - 3:00; 6. "Mother's Mark" - 7:11; 7. "Built Like This" - 4:16; 8. "Shots" - 2:29; 9. "Gato" - 2:44; 10. "Levitate (Remix)" - 2:32; 11. "Rrraahh" - 3:26; 12. "The Afterparty (Live at Jimmy's, Pt. 2)" - 4:15; 13. "No Panty Anthem" - 3:12

=== EPs ===
- 2012 – The Boombox Diaries, Vol. 1
- 2019 – 7 (A collaborative EP with The Polish Ambassador, real name David Sugalski)

=== Mixtapes ===
- 2011 – The Cassette Chronicles
- 2011 – Doobies x Popsicle Sticks

=== Singles ===
- 2011 – "Truth"
- 2012 – "Auntie Maria's Crib"
- 2016 – "Hieroglyphics"
- 2016 – "Negrita"
- 2016 – "All The Flowers"
- 2016 – "We Are One"
- 2017 – "BBYGRL"
- 2017 – "Buddhaveli"
- 2021 – "Changing That"
- 2021 – "Beeper (Remix)" (with Sos B4L)
- 2021 – "BLACKARITA"

=== Featured singles ===
- 2013 – "Dusk Till Dawn" (Syler feat. DJ JS-1 and Nitty Scott, MC)
- 2015 – "Not Impressed" (with Julie Anne San Jose)
- 2016 – "No Darkness Tonight" (with Blasco Says)
- 2020 - "Danger" (RDGLDGRN featuring Nitty Scott & Alexandra Stan)
- 2021 – "Four Better or Worse" (with Damu the Fudgemunk)
- 2019 – “So Hot/So Cold” by R/E (feat. Nitty Scott)

=== Guest appearances ===
- 2010 – "Pop a Bottle (Remix)" (Paris Jones feat. Nitty Scott, MC and VA)
- 2011 – "Daydream" (Rocky Rivera feat. Nitty Scott, MC)
- 2011 – "Black Swan" (Statik Selektah feat. Nitty Scott, MC and Rapsody)
- 2012 – "How I Fly" (Styles P feat. Nitty Scott, MC, Currensy and Avery Storm)
- 2012 – "Paid Dues" (Esohel feat. Nitty Scott, MC)
- 2012 – "Fatal Attraction" (Jared Evan feat. Nitty Scott, MC)
- 2012 – "Never Back Down" (Rah Digga feat. Nitty Scott, MC)
- 2012 - "Red Sky Morning" (Gangstagrass feat Nitty Scott, MC)
- 2012 - "Country Blues" (Gangstagrass feat Brandi Hard & Nitty Scott, MC)
- 2012 – "Any Means Necessary" (Kinetics feat. Nitty Scott, MC)
- 2012 – "Strangers" (Kinetics & One Love feat. Nitty Scott, MC)
- 2013 – "World Premiere" (Megadon feat. Nitty Scott, MC and Mr. Cheeks)
- 2013 – "Like a Prayer" (J57 feat. Nitty Scott, MC)
- 2013 – "We Ain't You" (Troy Ave feat. Nitty Scott, MC and CJ Fly)
- 2013 – "Bars For Days" (Termanology feat. Nitty Scott, MC and Easy Money)
- 2013 – "Boyz II Men" (Blu & Nottz feat. Nitty Scott, MC)
- 2015 – "Not Impressed" (Julie Anne San Jose feat. Nitty Scott, MC)
- 2019 – "SONIA" (Jamila Woods feat. Nitty Scott)
- 2019 – "Get Together" (Gang Starr feat. Ne-Yo & Nitty Scott)

=== Videos ===
- 2010 – "Monster (Freestyle)"
- 2011 – "Tell Somebody" (Directed by Conor Shillen)
- 2011 – "Auntie Maria's Crib" (Directed by Giuliano Jules)
- 2012 – "Bullshit Rap" (Directed by Donald Robinson Cole and Robert Adam Mayer)
- 2012 – "Express Yourself" (Directed by Ulysses)
- 2012 – "Planes, Trains and Automobiles" (Directed by Luke Wilson and Alexander Akande)
- 2012 – "Paid Dues" (Directed by Sense Hernandez)
- 2013 – "World Premiere" (Directed by Donald Robinson Cole)
- 2013 – "Bath Salt (Freestyle)" (Directed by Streets Riley)
- 2013 – "Flower Child" (Directed by Anthony Sylvester)
- 2013 – "Skippin Clouds" (Directed by Kendra MacLeod)
- 2015 – "Generation Now" (Directed by Nitzia Scott)
- 2015 – "U.F.O. (Unfiltered Offering)" (Directed by John Greene)
- 2017 – "Pxssy Powah!" (Directed by Damien Sandoval)
- 2017 – "La Diaspora" (Directed by Cutter Hodierne)
