= Star Feminine Band =

Beninese band

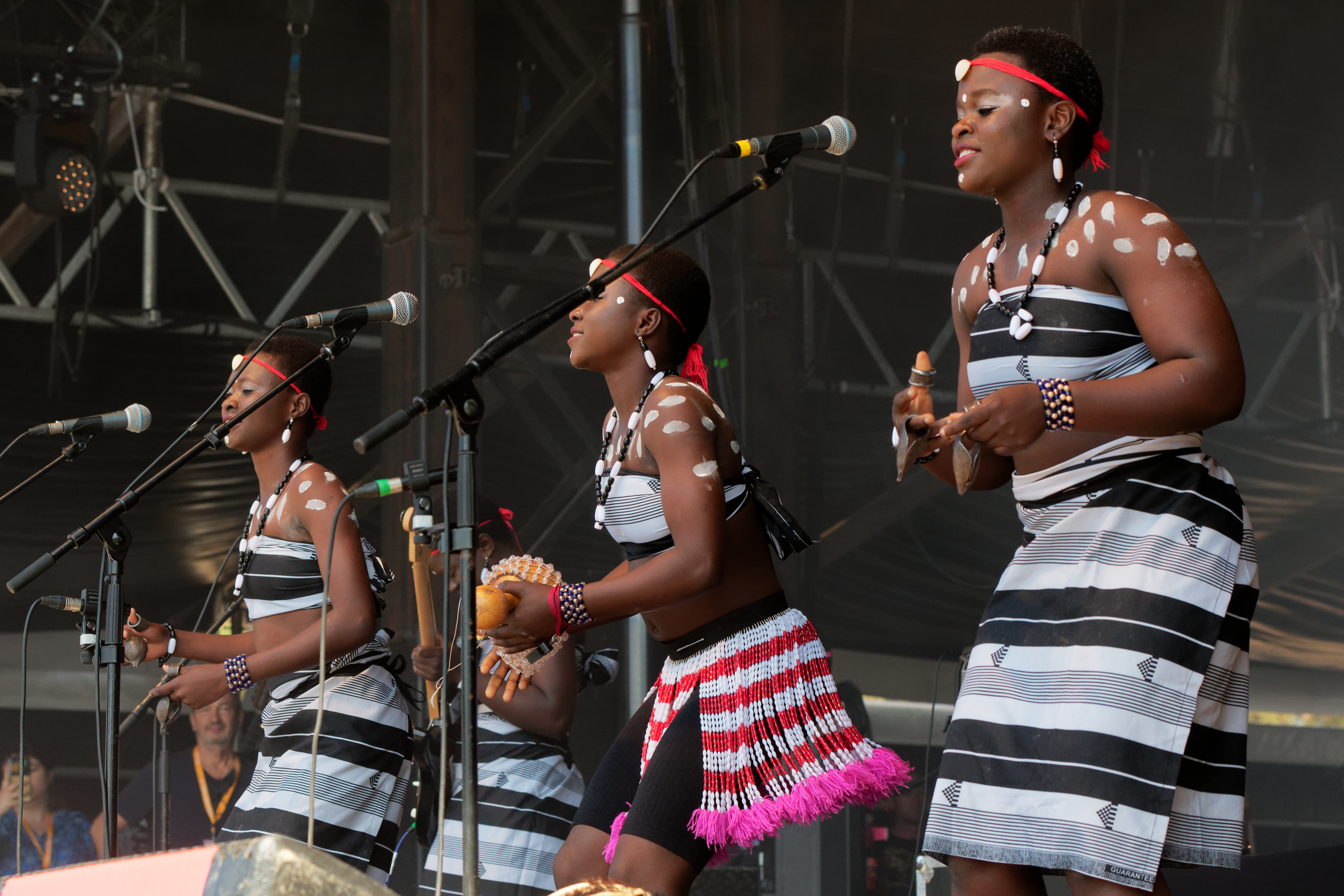
- Star Feminine Band performing at Festival du Bout du Monde 2022

Background information
- Origin: Natitingou, Benin
- Years active: 2016-present
- Label: Born Bad Records
- Members: Julienne; Grace; Benie; Urrice; Angélique; Marguerite; Anne; Sandrine
- Website: bornbadrecords.net/artists/star-feminine-band/

Star Feminine Band are a band consisting of eight female musicians from Benin, born between 2003 and 2010. The group sing songs on social topics, often with a feminist message.

== Formation ==
Star Feminine Band was the brainchild of Beninese musician André Balaguemon. Balaguemon, who moved from central Benin to Natitingou, collaborated with the city's mayor to organise music workshops for local girls, using Balaguemon's own instruments and advertising the project on local radio. The project had the aim of empowering local girls and defending their rights; Balaguemon stated that the band was about addressing the way women are mistreated by men. The group sing in a number of languages, including English, French, Waama, Peul, Ditammari and Fon. At first locals rejected the idea of girls playing music, but according to Balaguemon, after their first concert they were widely accepted.

== Musical career ==
Having rehearsed together for two years, the group came to the attention of French musical engineer Jéremie Verdier, who was volunteering in Benin at the time and heard the group rehearsing. Verdier, now the manager of the group, recorded demo tapes for the groups. The band signed to Born Bad Records in 2020, and released their first self-titled album. They released their second album, In Paris, in 2022. Later that year, the band featured on the track "Look Away, Look Away" by The Go! Team. A second single with The Go! Team, "The Me Frequency," was released in January 2023. Both songs feature on the album Get Up Sequences Part Two.

The band's songs are often about social topics, including the rights of women, female genital mutilation and forced marriage. Their musical style has been described as a mix of genres including garage rock, psychedelia, highlife and Congolese rumba. The group have performed at numerous major festivals, including Glastonbury and Roskilde.

In 2023, Star Feminine Band were named as UNICEF Young Champions for their activism.

== Members ==
- Julienne
- Grace
- Benie
- Urrice
- Angélique
- Marguerite
- Anne
- Sandrine

== Discography ==
=== Albums ===
- Star Feminine Band (2020)
- In Paris (2022)
- Jusqu'au bout du monde (2025)
