= Gillin =

Gillin may refer to:

== People ==
- Hugh Gillin (1925–2004), American actor
- John Gillin, American oilman who commissioned Frank Lloyd Wright to design the John Gillin Residence
- Margaret Girvin Gillin (1833–1915), Canadian painter
- John Lewis Gillin
- John Phillip Gillin
- R. Charles Gillin (born 1951), American Anglican bishop

== Other uses ==
- Gillin Boat Club, Fairmount Park, Philadelphia
- Gillin's Beach, Kauai, Hawaii
- John Gillin Residence designed by Frank Lloyd Wright in Dallas, Texas
