= Ninja (British rapper) =

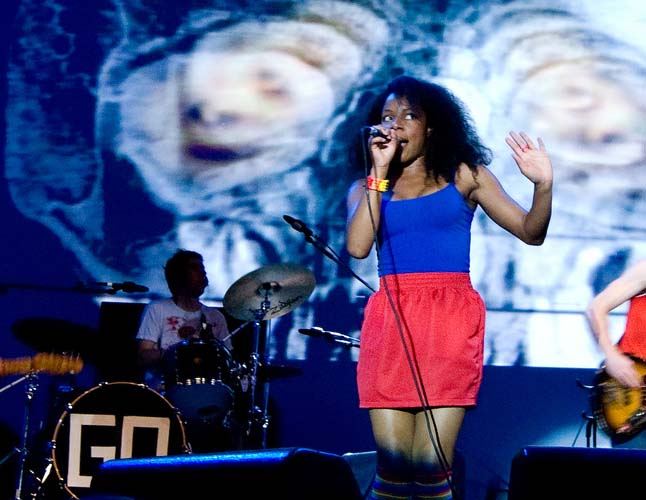
- Ninja performing with The Go! Team

Background information
- Born: Nkechi Ka Egenamba; 24 September 1983 (age 42)
- Origin: London, England
- Genres: Hip hop; indie rock
- Years active: 2004–present

Nkechi Ka Egenamba (born 24 September 1983), (first name pronounced n-kay-chee) known as Ninja, is an English rapper and the female lead vocalist for the British indie band The Go! Team. Doing a mixture of rapping, chanting and singing, Ninja is well known for her energetic stage performances and dancing. In 2005, NME voted Ninja the 15th coolest person in music.

== Early life and education ==
Born Nkechi Ka in 1983, "Nkechi" is short for Nkechinyere, and means "what God has given" or "gift of God" in Igbo, the language of the Igbo people, an ethnic group in West Africa, numbering in the tens of millions.

Ninja is from London. Her father is a Nigerian lawyer, and her mother is half-Egyptian, half-Nigerian. Ninja is one of five children and was brought up in a very strict household. She had been studying at university before she joined The Go! Team.

== The Go! Team ==
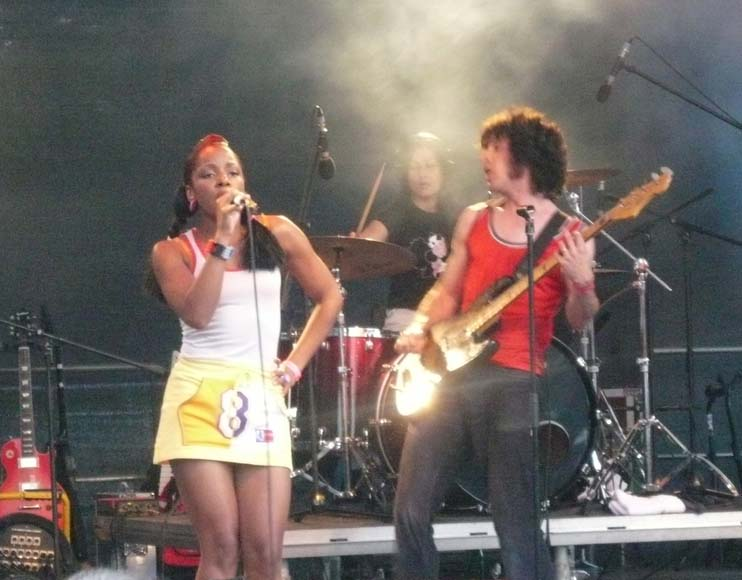
The Go! Team playing at Berlin Festival in July 2007

Ninja became the lead singer for The Go! Team after the founder, Ian Parton, created the first The Go! Team studio album. With Ninja, the live band became a "separate entity" to the original studio vision, as their performances became radically different from their recordings, particularly due to Ninja's freestyled vocals contrary to the sampled vocals present on the album. Parton acknowledged that Ninja had become the "face of the band" in an interview with Erik Leijon in September 2007.

== Non-Go! Team work ==
Ninja co-wrote and performed on Simian Mobile Disco tracks "Its The Beat" and "Hot Dog" on SMD's debut album Attack Decay Sustain Release.

Ninja co-wrote and performed on the track "Time Machine" by French band Rinocerose.

She co-wrote and performed on the Cut Chemist track "The Audience is Listening".

== Discography with The Go! Team ==
=== Albums ===
- Thunder, Lightning, Strike (2004) #48 UK
- Proof of Youth (2007) #21 UK, #142 US, #1 UK Indie
- Rolling Blackouts (2011)
- The Scene Between (2015)
- Semicircle (2018) #40 UK
- Get Up Sequences Part One (2021) #93 UK

=== Singles ===
- "Junior Kickstart" 7", 12" and CD single (2003)
- "The Power Is On" 12" single (2004)
- "Ladyflash" 7" and CD single (2004) #68 UK
- "Bottle Rocket" 7" and CD single (2005) #64 UK
- "Ladyflash" (re-issue) 7" and CD single (2006) #26 UK
- "Grip Like a Vice" single (2007) #57 UK
- "Doing It Right" Single (2007) #55 UK, #3 UK Indie

=== EPs ===
- Are You Ready for More? (Australian Tour EP) (2005)
- Audio Assault Course (College Radio Sessions) (2006)
- Step and Repeat (8 track EP) (2006)

=== Featured on ===
- Public Service Broadcast #3 (2004) (compilation album)
- Help: A Day in the Life (2005) (compilation album)

== See also ==
- Mononymous persons
