= Rappers Delight Club =

American hip hop group

- Origin: Silver Spring, Maryland
- Genres: Hip hop, pop
- Years active: 2006–2010
- Website: myspace.com/rappersdelightclub

The Rappers Delight Club was a rotating group of American elementary and middle school rappers from Silver Spring, Maryland. The group is most notable for their appearance in British funk/rock band The Go! Team’s second album, Proof of Youth, on the song "Universal Speech".

== History ==
The Rappers Delight Club was named after the Sugar Hill Gang song, "Rapper's Delight". It was also the name of a learn-to-rap project taught at Glenallan Elementary School as part of an after-school program led by high school teacher David Goldberg and audio engineer Joseph Mitra. The group ranged from ages five to twelve. They all wrote their own material and rap over music samples that are used as the backbone for their raps. The group members rapped about kid-related topics such as soccer, football, playing on the playground, shopping, etc.

The group has sampled music from Sufjan Stevens, Jens Lekman, The Go! Team and the theme music from Sesame Street's segment Elmo's World. They appeared in The Go! Team’s "Universal Speech" in 2007 for their second album, Proof of Youth, which they recorded their own remix later. In 2009, the group recorded "I Don't Wanna Grow Up...Yet", sampling singer-songwriter Tom Waits' "I Don't Wanna Grow Up" from his 1992 album Bone Machine. The group's last recording to date was "You'd Better Ask Somebody", recorded in 2010, before all of their music was accidentally deleted from MySpace, the group's former music host, in a botched server migration.

== Discography ==
=== Songs ===
- "You'd Better Ask Somebody", 2010
- "I Don't Wanna Grow Up...Yet", 2009
- "Universal Speech" (with The Go! Team), 2007
- "Universal Speech (RDC Remix)", 2007
- "Tick Tock", 2006
- "We’re Not Done", 2006
- "Hum", 2006
- "When We Were Kids", 2006 (versions 1 and 2)
- "First Ladies Anthem", 2006
