= Rolling Blackouts =

Studio album by the Go! Team
- Released: 31 January 2011
- Studios: Brighton Electric (Brighton, England); Fortress Studios (London, England); Temple Sound (Oxford, England); Black Iris Studios (Los Angeles, California); Laughing Dog Studios (Staten Island, New York); Red Room Recorders (Tampa, Florida); Runaway Studios (Tokyo)
- Genres: Indie pop; alternative dance; alternative hip-hop; avant-pop
- Length: 40:40
- Label: Memphis Industries
- Producers: The Go! Team; Gareth Parton

The Go! Team chronology
Proof of Youth (2007)	Rolling Blackouts (2011)	The Scene Between (2015)

Singles from Rolling Blackouts
- 1. "Buy Nothing Day" Released: 24 January 2011; 2. "Apollo Throwdown" Released: 16 April 2011; 3. "Ready to Go Steady" Released: 25 July 2011; 4. "T.O.R.N.A.D.O." Released: 2013

Rolling Blackouts is the third studio album by English band the Go! Team. It was released by Memphis Industries on 31 January 2011 in the United Kingdom and on 1 February 2011 in the United States.

== Reception ==
Professional ratings
Aggregate scores
Source	Rating
AnyDecentMusic?	6.9/10
Metacritic	73/100
Review scores
Source	Rating
AllMusic	4/5 stars
The A.V. Club	B+
Entertainment Weekly	B+
The Guardian	2/5 stars
NME	3/10
Pitchfork	7.5/10
Q	4/5 stars
Rolling Stone	3.5/5 stars
Spin	7/10
Uncut	4/5 stars

Rolling Blackouts currently holds a score of 73 on the review aggregate website Metacritic, indicating "generally positive reviews".

== Track listing ==
All tracks are written by The Go! Team, except where noted.

No.	Title	Writer(s)	Length
1.	"T.O.R.N.A.D.O."	The Go! Team; Stuart Bogie; Aaron Johnson	2:09
2.	"Secretary Song"	The Go! Team; Eddie Lashea; Piero Piccioni	3:32
3.	"Apollo Throwdown"	The Go! Team; Harry Nilsson	3:20
4.	"Ready to Go Steady"		2:45
5.	"Bust-Out Brigade"	The Go! Team; Joe Tex	2:42
6.	"Buy Nothing Day"		3:59
7.	"Super Triangle"		1:46
8.	"Voice Yr Choice"	The Go! Team; Syl Johnson; Marvin Smith	3:34
9.	"Yosemite Theme"	The Go! Team; Majrooh Sultanpuri; R. D. Burman; S. D. Burman	4:09
10.	"The Running Range"		3:45
11.	"Lazy Poltergeist"		1:40
12.	"Rolling Blackouts"		3:30
13.	"Back Like 8 Track"	The Go! Team; Alèmayèhu Eshète	3:49
Total length:			40:40

Sample credits

- "T.O.R.N.A.D.O." contains samples of "Beaten Metal", written by Stuart Bogie and Aaron Johnson, and performed by Antibalas.
- "Secretary Song" contains samples of "How Do You Like It?", written by Eddie Lashea and performed by The Sheppards; and "Acapulco Background Music", written and performed by Piero Piccioni.
- "Apollo Throwdown" contains samples of "The Birds", written and performed by Harry Nilsson.
- "Bust-Out Brigade" contains samples of "You're Right Ray Charles", written and performed by Joe Tex.
- "Voice Yr Choice" contains samples from "Different Strokes (B.E.T.)", written and performed by Syl Johnson; and "Remember the Rain", written by Marvin Smith and performed by 21st Century.
- "Yosemite Theme" contains samples of "Yeh Ladka Hai Allah Kaisa Hai Diwana", written by Majrooh Sultanpuri and R. D. Burman, and performed by Mohammed Rafi; and "Ab To Hai Tum Se", written by Majrooh Sultanpuri and S. D. Burman, and performed by Lata Mangeshkar.
- "Back Like 8 Track" contains samples of "Tèmèlès" and "Tèy Geryèlèshem", written by Alèmayèhu Eshète and performed by Eshète and Hirut Bekele.

== Personnel ==
Credits for Rolling Blackouts adapted from album liner notes.

The Go! Team

- Jamie Bell
- Sam Dook
- Ninja
- Ian Parton
- Chi Fukami Taylor
- Kaori Tsuchida

Additional musicians

- Yuko Araki – performance on "Secretary Song"
- Bethany Cosentino – performance on "Buy Nothing Day" and "Rolling Blackouts"
- Angèle David-Guillou – performance on "The Running Range"
- Marina Gasolina – performance on "The Running Range"
- The Girls at Dawn – performance on "Buy Nothing Day"
- Lispector – performance on "Ready to Go Steady"
- The London African Gospel Choir – performance on "The Running Range"
- Satomi Matsuzaki – performance on "Secretary Song"
- The Pink Diamonds – performance on "Back Like 8 Track"
- Dominique Young Unique – performance on "Apollo Throwdown" and "Voice Yr Choice"
- Franklin Anane
- Daniel Baboulene
- Samuel Byard
- Laurie Carpenter
- Sophia Gore
- Crystal Hardwicke
- Yeelen Hardwicke
- Sam Hiscox
- Lewis Husbands
- Gary Kavanagh
- Micki Lekoma
- Ollie Malley
- Lashelle McDonald
- Angel Mhlanga
- James SK Wān
- Gloria Moyo
- Mbombo Nfumi
- Samantha Pugh
- Luke Rhoden
- Noly Sithole
- William Wells
- Rebecca Wheddon

Production

- Guy Davie – mastering
- The Go! Team – production
- Gareth Parton – production
- Sam Williams – additional mixing

Artwork and design

- James Taylor – artwork

== Charts ==
Chart (2011)	Peak position
Irish Albums (IRMA)	59
Japanese Albums (Oricon)	84
Scottish Albums (Official Charts)	44
UK Albums (Official Charts)	50
UK Independent Albums (Official Charts)	5
US Billboard 200	162
US Heatseekers Albums (Billboard)	3
US Independent Albums (Billboard)	18
US Top Alternative Albums (Billboard)	22
US Top Rock Albums (Billboard)	33
