= Laura Taylor (singer) =

Brazilian singer

Laura Taylor is a Brazilian singer and one of two new singers in the baile funk band Bonde do Rolê. Born in Belo Horizonte, Taylor lived many years in New Zealand. She was added to the band after a talent search on MTV Brasil discovered her along with fellow new member Ana Bernardino.
