= Get Up Sequences Part Two =

Indie pop album by English band The Go! Team

Studio album by the Go! Team
- Released: 3 February 2023
- Studios: Church Road Studio (Brighton, England); Howard RD (Brighton, England); Tempermill Studio (Detroit, Michigan); Studio 95 (Brighton, England)
- Genre: Indie pop
- Length: 42:43
- Label: Memphis Industries

The Go! Team chronology
Get Up Sequences Part One (2021)	Get Up Sequences Part Two (2023)

Singles from Get Up Sequences Part Two
- 1. "Divebomb" Released: 26 September 2022; 2. "Look Away, Look Away" Released: 26 October 2022; 3. "Whammy-O" Released: 30 November 2022; 4. "Gemini" Released: 10 January 2023; 5. "The Me Frequency" Released: 31 January 2023

Get Up Sequences Part Two is the seventh studio album by English band the Go! Team. It was released on 3 February 2023 through Memphis Industries. It features guest vocals from The Star Feminine Band, Nitty Scott, IndigoYaj, Neha Hatwar, Aimee Lew, Jessie Miller, Rian Woods, Kokubo Chisato, Margot Magnieres and Hilarie Bratset.

== Reception ==
Professional ratings
Aggregate scores
Source	Rating
Metacritic	86/100
Review scores
Source	Rating
AllMusic	4.5/5 stars
MusicOMH	4/5 stars

According to the review aggregator Metacritic, Get Up Sequences Part Two received "universal acclaim" based on a weighted average score of 86 out of 100 from five critic scores. Editors of AllMusic Guide rated this album 4.5 out of five, with critic Tim Sendra calling this release "a vibrant, speaker-rattling set of songs that have all the bounce and soul of their best work". Writing for musicOMH, John Murphy rated this release four out of five stars, calling this album "audio adrenaline", noting that the band have maintained their "life-affirming" spirit for two decades and opining that "it's hard to imagine the band's usual energy being even greater, but they manage it here".

== Track listing ==
All tracks are written by Ian Parton, except where noted.

Get Up Sequences Part Two track listing
No.	Title	Writer(s)	Length
1.	"Look Away, Look Away"	Parton, André Balaguemon	3:45
2.	"Divebomb"		3:22
3.	"Getting to Know (All the Ways We're Wrong for Each Other)"		3:51
4.	"Stay and Ask Me in a Different Way"		3:16
5.	"The Me Frequency"	Parton, André Balaguemon	3:56
6.	"Whammy-O"	Parton, Nitty Scott	2:59
7.	"But We Keep On Trying"		3:25
8.	"Sock It to Me"		3:23
9.	"Going Nowhere"		2:00
10.	"Gemini"		2:43
11.	"Train Song"		4:17
12.	"Baby"		5:41
Total length:			42:43

== Personnel ==
The Go! Team

- Sam Dook – guitars
- Jaleesa Gemerts – drums, percussion
- Niadzi Muzira – guitars, vocals, percussion
- Ninja – vocals, drums
- Ian Parton – vocals, guitars, mixing, production
- Deanna Wilhelm – trumpet, vocals
- Adam Znaidi – bass guitar

Additional personnel

- Matt Colton – mastering
- IndigoYaj – backing vocals
- Luke Insect –design
- Jessie Miller – backing vocals
- Nitty Scott – backing vocals on "Whammy-O"
- Star Feminine Band – backing vocals
- Rian Woods – backing vocals

== Charts ==
Chart performance for Get Up Sequences Part Two
Chart (2023)	Peak position
Scottish Albums (Official Charts)	27
UK Independent Albums (Official Charts)	7

== See also ==
- List of 2023 albums
