= Robin Kester =

Dutch musician and songwriter

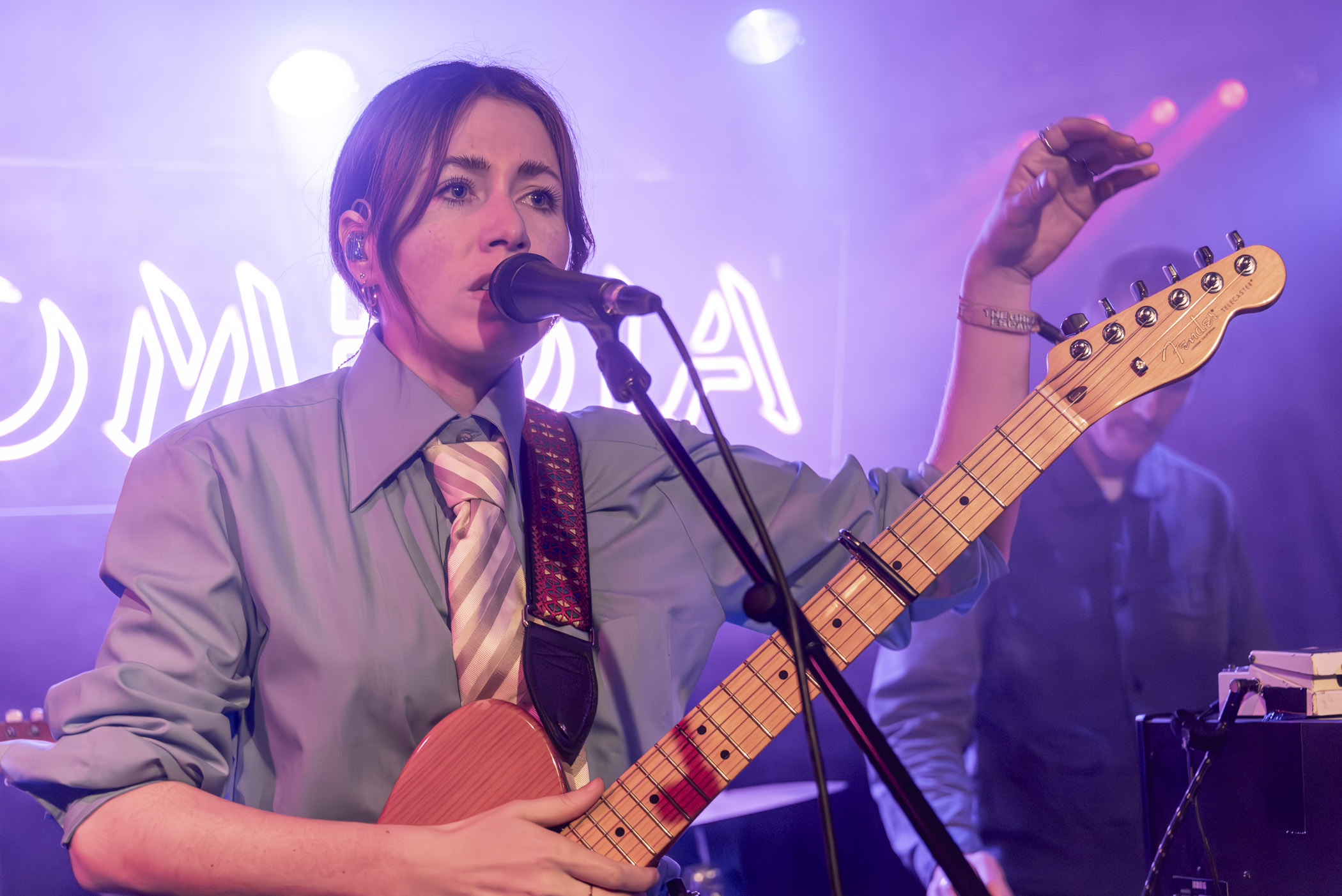
- Kester in 2025

Background information
- Origin: Rotterdam, Netherlands
- Genres: singer-songwriter; indie

Robin Kester is a Groningen-born Dutch musician and songwriter from Rotterdam. Her music style is often compared with that of Beth Gibbons and Weyes Blood.

== First EP and tour ==
In 2018 the EP Peel the Skin was released by the Amsterdam record label AT EASE. The following year she was the support act for the Irish band Villagers. In 2020 the mini-album This Is Not a Democracy was released by the same label (coproduced with Moss-frontman Marien Dorleijn). It included contributions from, amongst others, Conor O'Brien. The mini-album was chosen as the best album of 2020 by the editors of 3voor12, and it received four stars in De Volkskrant.

In 2022 she released new music. The singles Cat 13 and Leave Now were debuted on BBC 6 Music, and both were chosen as track of the week in De Volkskrant.

== ESNS, SXSW, MUSE and Press Play ==
In 2021 she performed at ESNS. On 5 May 2021 she was nominated for the Zilveren Notekraker. In 2022 a demo version of her track Day is Done was used in the American film Press Play. In March 2022 she also performed at the American cultural festival SXSW in Texas. In October 2022 she was the support act for the British rock band Muse (after an invitation from their lead singer Matt Bellamy) in the Amsterdam Carré.

== Honeycomb Shades and Dark Sky Reserve ==
In February 2023, her debut album Honeycomb Shades was released. Containing 11 songs, it was produced in collaboration with Marien Dorleijn, whose studio in the forest of Den Dolder was used for recording. Positive reviews were received from the De Volkskrant, Parool, Oor, Trouw en NRC. Following the release, Robin Kester and Amber Arcades undertook a joint tour in the Netherlands, again positively reviewed. The album was nominated for the 3voor12 Award for the best album of 2023, reached the 'Eindlijst' (twenty best albums) of the music journal OOR and was the highest ranked Dutch album of 2022, as listed by De Volkskrant. NRC called Honeycomb Shades the best Dutch album of 2023.

The follow-up, Dark Sky Reserve, was released on 12 September 2025. The album was recorded in Bristol with producer Ali Chant (a.o. PJ Harvey) and featured contributions from guitarist Adrian Utley (Portishead). Horn and string arrangements add a new dimension to Kester's characteristic sound. When asked what the album is about, Kester replied: "It's about fighting against myself, but secretly also already in the phase of acceptance. ... Realising that some things are just part of who you are and that you have to put up with them. ... [I]t's about stopping those endless battles. Acceptance, without making it cynical. I find that hopeful."

The album was very well received by the Dutch music press, while Stereogum called the new tracks 'otherworldly'. ‘After just a few albums, Kester has developed her own signature style, which she further deepens on the compelling Dark Sky Reserve,’ according to Dutch music magazine OOR. Dutch daily De Volkskrant gave the album the maximum five stars. Popular music web site 3voor12 (‘Another beautiful album!’) was also enthusiastic: ‘With their dark and melancholic sound, the songs sound like a night that slowly and calmly envelops you. Yet the album also sounds unexpectedly cheerful at times. In “Dog”, you can hear how Kester perfectly strikes that mysterious balance between gloom and lightness.’

== Discography ==
=== EPs ===
- Peel the Skin (2018)

=== Mini-albums ===
- This is not a Democracy (2020)
- Patch (2024)

=== Albums ===
- Honeycomb Shades (2023)
- Dark Sky Reserve (2025)

Singles

- Blossom (Moss Rework) (2019)
- Remove and Delete (2020)
- Suspirium (Live) (2020)
- Day is Done (2020)
- The Dirt (2020)
- Cigarette Song (2020)
- Sweat and Fright (2020)
- Sliding Door/ Sun (met Kaap) (2021)
- Leave Now (2022)
- Cat 13 (2022)
- Infinity Song (2022)
- Blinds (2022)
- Shape Memory (2023)
- Long Dark Sleep (2023)
- Small Christmas Tree (2024)
- Departure (2025)
- Happy Sad (It's a Party) (2025)
- An Hour Per Day (2025)
- The Daylight (2025)
- Perspective (2025)
