= Are You Ready for More? =

EP by The Go! Team
- Released: 2005
- Recorded: ?
- Genre: Indie, hip-hop, dance
- Length: 18:29
- Label: Memphis Industries
- Producer: Gareth Parton

Professional ratings
Review scores
Source	Rating
Pitchfork Media	(7.9/10)

Are You Ready for More? The Go! Team Australian Tour EP is an EP released by The Go! Team in 2005. Aside from "Bottle Rocket", none of the tracks from this EP are included in the original release of the band's debut album Thunder, Lightning, Strike, though in the expanded re-release both "Hold Yr Terror Close" and "We Just Won't Be Defeated" were included. The version of "Bottle Rocket" on this EP is a single version, and differs slightly from the one on the album.

== Track listing ==
1. "Bottle Rocket" (Single Version)
2. "The Ice Storm"
3. "We Listen Every Day"
4. "Hold Yr Terror Close"
5. "Did You Feel It Too?"
6. "We Just Won't Be Defeated"
