= European Heartbreak =

Studio album by Amber Arcades
- Released: 28 September 2018
- Length: 37:03
- Label: Heavenly

Amber Arcades chronology
Fading Lines (2016)	European Heartbreak (2018)

Singles from European Heartbreak
- 1. "Goodnight Europe" Released: 12 April 2018; 2. "Simple Song" Released: 23 April 2018; 3. "Alpine Town" Released: 23 July 2018; 4. "Where Did You Go" Released: 6 August 2018

Professional ratings
Aggregate scores
Source	Rating
Metacritic	74/100
Review scores
Source	Rating
AllMusic	3/5 stars
Clash	8/10
Dork	3/5 stars
Dork	3/5 stars
God Is in the TV	7/10
MusicOMH	4/5 stars

European Heartbreak is the second studio album by Dutch singer-songwriter Amber Arcades. It was released on 28 September 2018, under Heavenly Recordings.

== Release ==
On 12 April 2018, the song "Goodnight Europe" was released as a single. It was accompanied by a short film which indicated some of the themes from the forthcoming album and previewed excerpts from both the single and other songs, though at this point there was no formal announcement about its release. On 23 April, Amber Arcades announced the release of the new album, along with another single "Simple Song". The third single "Alpine Town" was released on 23 July 2018. Amber Arcades said of the single:

I wrote this song exactly a year ago while on holiday in Guillestre, a small town in the French Alps. I was kind of in a sad place and my boyfriend had dragged me along to get away from all that, but I guess it doesn't really work like that, ha. It just made me reflect on the sad part of the tourist condition as a metaphor for life.

The fourth single "Where Did You Go" was released on 6 August 2018.

== Critical reception ==
European Heartbreak was met with "generally favorable" reviews from critics. At Metacritic, which assigns a weighted average rating out of 100 to reviews from mainstream publications, this release received an average score of 74, based on 11 reviews. Aggregator Album of the Year gave the release a 71 out of 100 based on a critical consensus of 12 reviews.

== Track listing ==
All tracks are written by Annelotte de Graaf

European Heartbreak track listing
No.	Title	Length
1.	"Simple Song"	2:32
2.	"Hardly Knew"	3:05
3.	"Oh My Love (What Have We Done)"	3:16
4.	"Goodnight Europe"	4:03
5.	"Alpine Town"	3:21
6.	"I've Done the Best"	3:33
7.	"Self-Portrait in a Car at Night"	2:45
8.	"Something's Gonna Take Your Love Away"	3:57
9.	"Antoine"	3:19
10.	"Where Did You Go"	2:47
11.	"Baby, Eternity"	4:25

== Personnel ==
Musicians

- Annelotte de Graaf – primary artist, guitar
- Taylor Barnett – trumpet
- Nathaniel Lee – trombone
- Anna Bishop – violin
- Jason McComb – cello
- Meg Duffy – bass
- Treesa Gold – violin
- Adrian Pintea – violin
- Ellen Riccio – violin
- Schuyler Slack – cello
- Manuel Van Den Berg – keyboards
- Rob Quallich – trumpet
- Cameron Ralston – bass
- Ben Culver – trombone
- Daniel Clarke – keyboards
- Pinson Chanselle – percussion
- Colin Killalea – backing vocals

Production

- Chris Cohen – producer
- Trey Pollard – producer, engineer, string arranger
- Guy Davies – mastering
- Adrian Olsen – engineer
- Ali Chant – mixer
- Nick Helderman – photography
