= Ana Bernardino =

Brazilian singer

Ana Bernardino is a Brazilian singer and one of two new singers in Brazilian Baile Funk band Bonde Do Rolê. She was added to the band after a talent search on MTV Brasil discovered her along with fellow new member, Laura Taylor.
