= Semicircle (album) =

Studio album by the Go! Team
- Released: 19 January 2018
- Studios: Brighton Electric (Brighton, England); Howard RD (Brighton, England); Metway Studio (Brighton, England); AMR Studio (Houston, Texas); Tempermill Studio (Detroit, Michigan)
- Genre: Indie pop
- Length: 40:42
- Label: Memphis Industries
- Producer: Ian Parton

The Go! Team chronology
The Scene Between (2015)	Semicircle (2018)	Get Up Sequences Part One (2021)

Singles from Semicircle
- 1. "Semicircle Song" Released: 11 October 2017; 2. "Mayday" Released: 30 November 2017; 3. "All the Way Live" Released: 5 January 2018

Professional ratings
Aggregate scores
Source	Rating
AnyDecentMusic?	7.1/10
Metacritic	70/100
Review scores
Source	Rating
AllMusic	4/5 stars
The A.V. Club	B−
The Independent	3/5 stars
Mojo	3/5 stars
The Observer	4/5 stars
Pitchfork	6.3/10
PopMatters	8/10
Record Collector	4/5 stars
The Skinny	4/5 stars
Uncut	6/10

Semicircle is the fifth studio album by English band the Go! Team. It was released on 19 January 2018 by Memphis Industries. Vocals on the album were provided by band members Ninja and Maki, with guest vocals from the Detroit Youth Choir, Julie Margat, Darenda Weaver, and Amber Arcades. Brass was provided by the Neon Saints Brass Band.

== Accolades ==
Accolades for Semicircle
Publication	Accolade	Rank	Ref.
Rough Trade	Top 100 Albums of 2018	97	

== Track listing ==
All tracks are written by Ian Parton, except where noted.

Semicircle track listing
No.	Title	Writer(s)	Length
1.	"Mayday"		3:57
2.	"Chain Link Fence"		3:40
3.	"Semicircle Song"	Parton; Stuart Bogie	3:29
4.	"Hey!"		2:53
5.	"The Answer's No – Now What's the Question?"		4:26
6.	"Chico's Radical Decade"	Parton; Bram Makahekum	2:41
7.	"All the Way Live"	Parton; John Harris	3:33
8.	"If There's One Thing You Should Know"		3:25
9.	"Tangerine / Satsuma / Clementine"		1:23
10.	"She's Got Guns"	Parton; Nkechi Egenamba; Ross Harris; Bert Page; Mike Page; Tom Watt	3:30
11.	"Plans Are Like a Dream U Organise"		3:44
12.	"Getting Back Up"		4:01
Total length:			40:42

== Personnel ==
The Go! Team

- Sam Dook
- Ninja
- Simone Odaranile
- Ian Parton
- Angela Won-Yin Mak

Additional musicians

- Amber Arcades – vocals on "The Answer's No – Now What's the Question?" and "Plans Are Like a Dream U Organise"
- Detroit Youth Choir – vocals on "Mayday", "Semicircle Song", "All the Way Live", "She's Got Guns" and "Getting Back Up"
- Doreen Kirchner – vocals on "The Answer's No – Now What's the Question?"
- Julie Margat – vocals on "Hey!"
- Darenda Weaver – vocals on "The Answer's No – Now What's the Question?"

Production

- Matt Colton – mastering
- Ian Parton – mixing, production
- Paul "P-Dub" Walton – mixing

Artwork and design

- Luke Insect – graphic design
- James Slater – art direction
- Annick Wolfers – cover photograph

== Charts ==
Chart performance for Semicircle
Chart (2018)	Peak position
Scottish Albums (Official Charts)	33
UK Albums (Official Charts)	39
UK Independent Albums (Official Charts)	4
