= Proof of Youth =

Studio album by the Go! Team
- Released: 10 September 2007
- Recorded: 2006–07
- Studios: Brighton Electric (Brighton, England)
- Genres: Indie rock; indie pop; alternative dance; alternative hip-hop
- Length: 36:26
- Label: Memphis Industries
- Producers: The Go! Team; Gareth Parton

The Go! Team chronology
Thunder, Lightning, Strike (2004)	Proof of Youth (2007)	Rolling Blackouts (2011)

Singles from Proof of Youth
- 1. "Grip Like a Vice" Released: 2 July 2007; 2. "Doing It Right" Released: 3 September 2007; 3. "The Wrath of Marcie" Released: 19 November 2007; 4. "Milk Crisis" Released: 11 June 2008

Professional ratings
Aggregate scores
Source	Rating
Metacritic	77/100
Review scores
Source	Rating
AllMusic	3.5/5 stars
Blender	4/5 stars
Entertainment Weekly	B
The Guardian	4/5 stars
MSN Music (Consumer Guide)	A−
NME	7/10
Pitchfork	7.2/10
Rolling Stone	3.5/5 stars
Spin	3.5/5 stars
Uncut	4/5 stars

Proof of Youth is the second studio album by English band the Go! Team.

== Released ==
It was released on 10 September 2007 in the United Kingdom by Memphis Industries and a day later in the United States by Sub Pop. Proof of Youth was preceded by two singles: "Grip Like a Vice", released on 2 July 2007, and "Doing It Right", released on 3 September 2007.

The first pressing of the album on Compact Disc includes a second disc, with six additional tracks in the UK or four in the US.

== Composition ==
Proof of Youth encompasses various genres of music, including indie rock, hip-hop and dance. The album features vocal contributions from Bonde do Rolê's Marina Ribatski, Solex, the Double Dutch Divas, the Rappers Delight Club, and Public Enemy's Chuck D.

== Track listing ==
No.	Title	Writer(s)	Length
1.	"Grip Like a Vice"	The Go! Team; Charles Hearndon; McKinley Jackson; Melvin Griffin; Ruth Copeland; Ronald Greene; TaharQa and Tunde Ra Aleem	2:46
2.	"Doing It Right"	The Go! Team; Weldon McDougal; Guy Hemric; Jerry Styner	3:23
3.	"My World"	Alan Parker	2:08
4.	"Titanic Vandalism"	The Go! Team; Hearndon; Jackson; Griffin; Copeland	3:50
5.	"Fake ID"	The Go! Team	3:25
6.	"Universal Speech"	The Go! Team; Marina Vello	2:35
7.	"Keys to the City"	The Go! Team; Bill Leeder; Bruno Nicolai; The Double Dutch Divas	3:09
8.	"The Wrath of Marcie"	The Go! Team; Jerry Reed Hubbard	3:23
9.	"I Never Needed It Now So Much"	The Go! Team; Peter Gosling; Peter Scott	3:26
10.	"Flashlight Fight" (featuring Chuck D)	The Go! Team; Carlton Ridenhour; Gene Page	2:49
11.	"Patricia's Moving Picture"	The Go! Team; Alfredo Ricardo do Nascimento	4:12

Japanese bonus tracks
No.	Title	Writer(s)	Length
12.	"A Version of Myself"	The Go! Team	2:32
13.	"Bull in the Heather"	Kim Gordon; Thurston Moore; Lee Ranaldo; Steve Shelley	3:04
14.	"Willow's Song"	Paul Giovanni	4:26
15.	"Milk Crisis"	The Go! Team	2:46

UK edition bonus disc
No.	Title	Writer(s)	Length
1.	"Milk Crisis"	The Go! Team	2:48
2.	"Willow's Song"	Giovanni	4:26
3.	"A Version of Myself"	The Go! Team	2:32
4.	"Bull in the Heather"	Gordon; Moore; Ranaldo; Shelley	3:04
5.	"Grip Like a Vice" (Black Affair Remix)	The Go! Team; Hearndon; Jackson; Griffin; Copeland; Greene; Taharqa Aleem; Tunde Aleem	3:57
6.	"Grip Like a Vice" (Burnt Clay Remix)	The Go! Team	12:23

US edition bonus disc
No.	Title	Writer(s)	Length
1.	"Milk Crisis"	The Go! Team	2:48
2.	"Phantom Broadcast"	The Go! Team	4:26
3.	"A Version of Myself"	The Go! Team	2:32
4.	"Grip Like a Vice" (Black Affair Remix)	The Go! Team; Hearndon; Jackson; Griffin; Copeland; Greene; Taharqa Aleem; Tunde Aleem	3:57

Sample credits

- "Grip Like a Vice" contains samples of "Psycha-Soula-Funkadelic", written by Charles Hearndon, McKinley Jackson, Melvin Griffin, and Ruth Copeland, and performed by The Politicians featuring McKinley Jackson; "Cosmic Blast", written by Ronald Greene, Taharqa Aleem, and Tunde Aleem, and performed by Captain Rock; and Beat This: A Hip-Hop History.
- "Doing It Right" contains samples of "I'll Always Love You", written by Weldon McDougal and performed by Cindy Gibson; and "International Girl", written by Guy Hemric and Jerry Styner.
- "My World" is a version of "The Free Life" by Alan Parker.
- "Titanic Vandalism" contains samples of "Psycha-Soula-Funkadelic", written by Charles Hearndon, McKinley Jackson, Melvin Griffin, and Ruth Copeland, and performed by The Politicians featuring McKinley Jackson.
- "Keys to the City" contains samples of "Out of Your Mind", written by Bill Leeder; "99 Donne, Seq. 3", written and performed by Bruno Nicolai; and I Was Made to Love Her.
- "The Wrath of Marcie" contains samples of "Turn It Around in Your Mind", written by Jerry Reed Hubbard and performed by Glen Campbell.
- "I Never Needed It Now So Much" contains samples of "Early in the Morning", written and performed by Peter Gosling and Peter Scott.
- "Flashlight Fight" contains samples of "Blacula Strikes!", written and performed by Gene Page.
- "Patricia's Moving Picture" contains samples of "Mulher Rendeira", written and performed by Alfredo Ricardo do Nascimento.

== Personnel ==
Credits for Proof of Youth adapted from album liner notes.

The Go! Team

- Jamie Bell – bass, glockenspiel, feedback
- Sam Dook – guitar, drums, banjo
- Ninja – vocals
- Ian Parton – guitar, harmonica, drums, piano
- Chi Fukami Taylor – drums, vocals
- Kaori Tsuchida – guitar, vocals, glockenspiel, keyboards

Additional musicians

- Joe Auckland
- Chuck D – performance on "Flashlight Fight"
- DJ Manipulate
- The Double Dutch Divas – performance on "Universal Speech" and "Keys to the City"
- Bob Dowell
- Elisabeth Esselink – performance on "Fake ID"
- Fierce Allstars
- Gary Kavanagh
- Myriam Megharbi
- Robin Pridy
- Rappers Delight Club – performance on "Universal Speech"
- Ben Somers
- Marina Vello – performance on "Titanic Vandalism" and "Universal Speech"

Production

- The Go! Team – production
- Gareth Parton – production
- Streaky – mastering

Artwork and design

- Sam Egarr – additional design
- Kate Ferrier – artwork

== Charts ==
Chart (2007)	Peak position
Australian Albums (ARIA)	75
French Albums (SNEP)	95
Irish Albums (IRMA)	24
Japanese Albums (Oricon)	79
Scottish Albums (Official Charts)	21
UK Albums (Official Charts)	21
UK Independent Albums (Official Charts)	1
US Billboard 200	142
US Heatseekers Albums (Billboard)	2
US Independent Albums (Billboard)	19
