= Marina Ribatski =

Brazilian singer

- Also known as: Marina Gasolina; MC Marino Vello
- Born: November 25, 1984 (age 41)
- Origin: Brazil
- Occupation: Musician
- Formerly of: Bonde do Rolê

Marina Evelyn Vello Ribatski (born November 25, 1984), also known as Marina Gasolina, Marina Ribatski and MC Marina Vello, is a Brazilian singer and the former MC/Singer/Songwriter for Brazilian Funk Carioca band Bonde do Rolê. She decided to leave the band in December 2007 due to problems within the band. Her musical influences include Hole. She was formerly a literature student at the Federal University of Paraná.

== Life and career ==
After playing in several punk bands during her teenage years, Marina founded and fronted Domino-signed, Brazilian baile funk band Bonde Do Rolê. After touring the world for two years straight, they released their debut album With Lasers in 2007, which was produced by Diplo, DJ Chernobyl and Radioclit. The album was an international success, and one of its songs, "Solta o Frango", was used in a Nokia advertisement, on the series Ugly Betty and was also featured on the soundtrack of the Electronic Arts game FIFA 08. Marina then left the band to focus on her solo career and broaden her horizons.

She moved to London in 2008 and spent her time recording tracks for international acts such as Crookers, Herve, Maskinen, Severin, The Go! Team, AcidKids and Architecture in Helsinki. This led to her building her own, new sound and writing songs with Berlin-based Electronicat and the Brazilian one man band O Lendario Chucrobillyman.

She is featured in the Maskinen song and music video "Dansa med vapen", released in October 2009.

In 2010, Marina founded her own label, Anfetamina Records, and released her first solo single "Leone", produced by Etienne Tron (a.k.a. Radioclit) and Electronicat.

In 2011, she collaborated with Secousse to record a version of "Freak le Boom Boom" for the Red Hot Organization's most recent charitable album Red Hot+Rio 2. The album is a follow-up to the 1996 Red Hot + Rio. Proceeds from the sales were donated to raise awareness and money to fight AIDS/HIV and related health and social issues.

In 2013 Marina was working on her debut album Commando with producer Daniel Hunt from Ladytron.
