= Grip Like a Vice =

Single by The Go! Team

from the album Proof of Youth
- B-side: "Version of Myself"; "Bull in the Heather"
- Released: 2007
- Genre: Indie rock, dance, hip hop
- Length: 4:01
- Label: Memphis Industries
- Songwriter(s): Charles Hearndon, McKinley Jackson, Melvin Griffin, Ruth Copeland / Ronald Greene, Taharqa Aleem, Tunde Aleem

The Go! Team singles chronology
"Ladyflash" (2006)	"Grip Like a Vice" (2007)	"Doing It Right" (2007)

Alternative cover
- Vinyl 7" single cover

"Grip Like a Vice" is a single from the album Proof of Youth by The Go! Team. It was released on July 9, 2007 on Memphis Industries. It was released as a CD single and was also released on two limited edition coloured vinyl singles. It reached number 57 on the UK Singles Chart and ranked at number 58 on Rolling Stone's list of the 100 Best Songs of 2007. This song was also included in the game FIFA Street 3.

== Track listing ==
- "Grip Like a Vice" CD single
1. "Grip Like a Vice"
2. "A Version of Myself"
- "Grip Like a Vice" Vinyl 7" (S1)
1. "Grip Like a Vice"
2. "Bull in the Heather"
- "Grip Like a Vice" Vinyl 7" (S2)
1. "Grip Like a Vice"
2. "Grip Like a Vice (Black Affair Remix)"
