= Hedgehog (band) =

Chinese indie rock band

Hedgehog Chinese: 刺猬
- Origin: Beijing, China
- Genres: Alternative rock
- Years active: 2005-present
- Labels: Modern Sky, Self-Released
- Members: ZO (Zhao Zijian) (Chinese: 子健 (赵子健)); Atom (Shi Lu)(Chinese: 阿童木 (石璐)); He Yifan (Chinese: 何一帆)
- Past members: Box (Chinese: 博宣)
- Website: hedgehogrock.bandcamp.com

Hedgehog is a Chinese indie rock trio formed in 2005 by partners ZO (Zhao Zijian) and Atom (Shi Lu). The band has a strong reputation throughout the country, renowned for their energetic live performances and catchy song writing.

Entertainment event and venue listing magazine City Weekend listed Hedgehog in their articles The Beijing Bands You Should Already Know About and The Hottest Bands of 2011.

Their musical influences include The Jesus and Mary Chain, The Ramones and Nirvana.

The drummer Atom has been a focal point in the band, known for her small, cute appearance and aggressive drumming style. Atom's name references Astroboy, who is known for his small size and power.

Hedgehog song lyrics are sung in both Mandarin Chinese and English, primarily by ZO. Atom also occasionally sings lead vocals.

In 2011, the band toured the US, with Xiu Xiu where they also recorded [Sun Fun Gun] in New York City, as produced by John Grew and Russell Simins from Jon Spencer Blues Explosion.

== B-Side Lovers ==
Started in 2009, B-Side Lovers was ZO and Atom's two-piece side project whose edgier sound focused more on the songwriting process and instrumental experimentation.

== Notable performances ==
- October 21, 2010: CMJ Festival, New York

== Discography ==
- 2006: Happy Idle Kid
- 2007: Noise Hit World
- 2009: Blue Day Dreaming
- 2011: Honeyed and Killed
- 2011: DEstroy meMOries
- 2011: Still Alive (bootleg)
- 2012: Sun Fun Gun
- 2014: Phantom Pop Star
- 2015: Neurons
- 2018: Sound of life towards
- 2020: A Newborn White Immortal
- 2022: Crow Valley - It's All Connected
