= Get Up Sequences Part One =

Studio album by the Go! Team
- Released: 2 July 2021
- Studios: Howard RD (Brighton, England), Tempermill Studio (Detroit, Michigan), Studio Humbug (Isle of Wight, England), Urchin Studio (London, England)
- Genres: Indie pop; funk
- Length: 31:47
- Label: Memphis
- Producer: Ian Parton

The Go! Team chronology
Semicircle (2018)	Get Up Sequences Part One (2021)	Get Up Sequences Part Two (2023)

Singles from Get Up Sequences Part One
- 1. "World Remember Me Now" Released: 18 March 2021; 2. "Pow" Released: 12 May 2021; 3. "A Bee Without Its Sting" Released: 15 June 2021

Professional ratings
Aggregate scores
Source	Rating
Metacritic	71/100
Review scores
Source	Rating
AllMusic	4/5 stars
Clash	7/10
DIY	3/5 stars
Exclaim!	7/10
The Independent	3/5 stars
NME	3/5 stars
Pitchfork	6.8/10
Slant Magazine	4/5 stars

Get Up Sequences Part One is the sixth studio album by English band the Go! Team. It was released on 2 July 2021 through Memphis Industries.

== Track listing ==
All tracks are written by Ian Parton; "Cookie Scene" written with Indigo Yaj; "Pow" written with Ninja.

Get Up Sequences Part One track listing
No.	Title	Length
1.	"Let the Seasons Work"	4:13
2.	"Cookie Scene"	2:39
3.	"A Memo for Maceo"	1:57
4.	"We Do It But Never Know Why"	4:04
5.	"Freedom Now"	2:03
6.	"Pow"	3:14
7.	"I Loved You Better"	3:12
8.	"A Bee Without its Sting"	3:12
9.	"Tame the Great Plains"	3:01
10.	"World Remember Me Now"	4:12
Total length:		31:47

Japanese edition bonus tracks
No.	Title	Length
11.	"Headache in My Heart"	3:22
12.	"Look Outside" (A New Year's Coming)	3:22
Total length:		38:36

== Personnel ==
The Go! Team

- Ian Parton – performance, production, mixing
- Ninja – performance
- Sam Dook – performance
- Simone Odaranile – performance
- Adam Znaidi – performance
- Niadzi Muzira – performance

Additional musicians

- Deanna Wilhelm – trumpet
- Andy Hume – trumpet
- Viva Msimang – trombone
- Sarah Hayes – flute
- Indigo Yaj – additional vocals
- Rian Woods – additional vocals
- Jessie Miller – additional vocals
- Lakhiya Trice – additional vocals
- Tori Wyatt – additional vocals
- A'Zariah Burgin – additional vocals

Technical

- Matt Colton – mastering
- Boe Weaver – additional mixing
- Paul "P-Dub" Walton – additional mixing

Visuals

- Luke Insect – cover design

== Charts ==
Chart performance for Get Up Sequences Part One
Chart (2021)	Peak position
Scottish Albums (Official Charts)	12
UK Albums (Official Charts)	93
UK Independent Albums (Official Charts)	4

== Reception ==
On review aggregator site Metacritic, the album has a score of 71, indicating "generally favorable reviews".
