= With Lasers =

Studio album by Bonde do Rolê
- Released: June 5, 2007
- Genre: Funk carioca
- Length: 30:45
- Label: Domino Records

Professional ratings
Review scores
| Source | Rating |
|---|---|
| Allmusic | 3.5/5 stars |
| NME | 7/10 stars |
| Pitchfork Media | 6.5/10 |
| Stylus Magazine | B |

With Lasers is a 2007 album by the band Bonde do Rolê. It was released on the Domino Records label. The album title is based on an Internet meme seen in the social network service Orkut, largely used by Communities: there are "with lasers" communities for everything (one notable exception being "Lasers with Chuck Norris" instead of the opposite, due to influence from the Chuck Norris Facts). "Solta o Frango" is featured in FIFA 08, the video game by EA Sports.

== Track listing ==
1. "Dança do Zumbi" - 2:51
2. "Solta O Frango" - 2:15
3. "James Bonde" - 1:59
4. "Tieta" - 1:59
5. "Office Boy" - 2:29
6. "Marina do Bairro" - 2:14
7. "Divine Gosa" - 2:46
8. "Marina Gasolina" - 3:36
9. "Caminhao de Gas" - 2:20
10. "Geremia" - 2:44
11. "Quero te Amar" - 3:10
12. "Bondallica" - 2:04
