= John Gillin Residence =

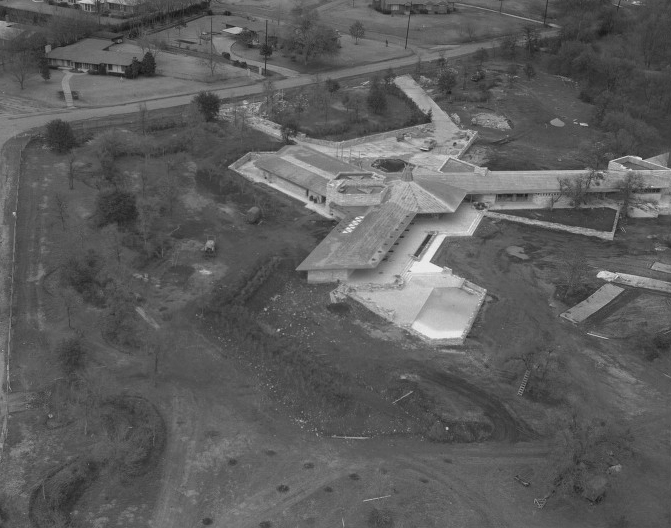

- Location within Texas

General information
- Type: House
- Architectural style: Usonian
- Location: Dallas, Texas
- Coordinates: 32.867497°N 96.829625°W
- Construction started: 1958

Design and construction
- Architect: Frank Lloyd Wright

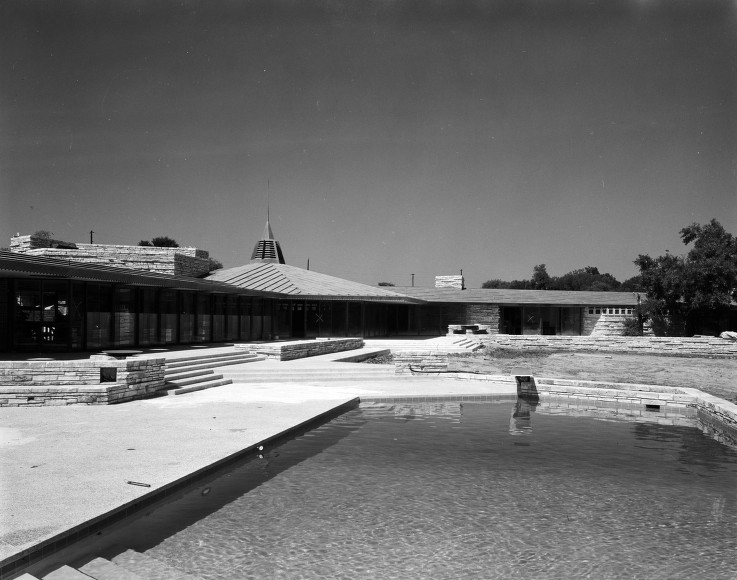
View of the house and pool, 1957.

The John Gillin Residence is a large single-story Usonian house, designed by Frank Lloyd Wright in 1950 and built in Dallas, Texas, in 1958. The Gillin House is the only residential project by Wright in Dallas. Gillin, a successful oilman, geophysicist and electronics "gadgeteer", commissioned Wright to design a work of art that would also be suitable for living and entertaining. A self-made man, Wright respected him and allowed him to design many details including all door hardware, the stainless steel kitchenettes and even the diving board support.

This sprawling Usonian house is one of Wright's most extensive single-story residences. Three wings spin off a central hexagon much as might have happened had Wingspread been based on an equilateral parallelogram rather than a square. The home is organized around a massive angular fireplace. The acute angles of 60 and 120 degrees give intimacy to the rooms with ample light-filled space and volume that is unusual for a Frank Lloyd Wright designed home. The grand living room is under a hexagonal copper dome roof and ventilator specifically copied from the Arizona Biltmore Hotel's Aztec ballroom.

The home was designed in response to the south central prairie's climate and its site of seven acres overlooking a creek. Long horizontal outer walls of understated native sandstone and horizontal bands of windows converge to create a dramatic entry.

The Gillin House was featured as Bob Mapplethorpe's house in the 1996 Wes Anderson film Bottle Rocket.

== See also ==
- List of Frank Lloyd Wright works
