= The Power Is On =

Single by The Go! Team

from the album Thunder, Lightning, Strike
- Released: 19 July 2004
- Genre: Indie rock, alternative hip hop
- Label: Memphis Industries/Columbia Records

"The Power Is On" is a song from English band The Go! Team from their 2004 album Thunder, Lightning, Strike.

The song is ranked at number 13 on Pitchfork's list of the 50 Best Singles of 2004. "The Power is On" was included in the 2008 book The Pitchfork 500: Our Guide to the Greatest Songs from Punk to Present.

== Track listing ==
1. "The Power Is On"
2. "Hold Yr Terror Close"
3. "The Ice Storm"

== Usage in media ==
"The Power Is On" was featured in a 2010 commercial for the National Football League's Play60 campaign, featuring the Atlanta Falcons. Subsequent teams to film commercials with this song include the Chicago Bears and the Carolina Panthers.

The song was also used on the soundtrack for EA Sports' 2006 FIFA World Cup Germany video game. It can also be heard in the Elliot Page film Whip It, but was not included on the film's soundtrack. The song has also been featured in promotional materials for the G4 series Jump City: Seattle and American Ninja Warrior.
