= Bottle Rocket (soundtrack) =

Soundtrack album by various artists
- Released: January 14, 1997
- Label: London Recordings

Professional ratings
Review scores
Source	Rating
Allmusic	link

Bottle Rocket is a 1997 soundtrack to the Wes Anderson film of the same name. The film's score was composed by Mark Mothersbaugh.

Three songs from the film, "2000 Man" by The Rolling Stones, "7 and 7 Is" and "Alone Again Or" by Love, were not included.

== Track listing ==
1. "Voluntary Hospital Escape" – Mark Mothersbaugh
2. "Gun Buyers" – Mark Mothersbaugh
3. "Bookstore Robbery" – Mark Mothersbaugh
4. "Dignan's Dance" – Mark Mothersbaugh
5. "And Also Because He Fired Me" – Mark Mothersbaugh
6. "Zorro Is Back" – Oliver Onions
7. "Cleaning Rooms With Inez" – Mark Mothersbaugh
8. "She Looks Just Like You" – Mark Mothersbaugh
9. "Pachanga Diferente" – René Touzet
10. "No Lifeguard on Duty" – Mark Mothersbaugh
11. "Mambo Guajiro" – René Touzet
12. "Rocky" – Mark Mothersbaugh
13. "Doesn't Sound That Bad in Spanish" – Mark Mothersbaugh
14. "Over and Done With" – The Proclaimers
15. "Snowflake Music/Mr. Henry's Chop Shop" – Mark Mothersbaugh
16. "You're Breaking His Heart" – Mark Mothersbaugh
17. "Goddammit I'm In" – Mark Mothersbaugh
18. "No Jazz" – Mark Mothersbaugh
19. "Highway Reprised" – Mark Mothersbaugh
20. "75 Year Plan" – Mark Mothersbaugh
21. "Futureman's Theme" – Mark Mothersbaugh
