= Bottle Rocket =

1996 film by Wes Anderson

- Theatrical release poster
- Directed by: Wes Anderson
- Written by: Owen Wilson; Wes Anderson
- Based on: Bottle Rocket by Owen Wilson and Wes Anderson
- Produced by: Polly Platt; Cynthia Hargrave
- Starring: Owen Wilson; Luke Wilson; Robert Musgrave; Andrew Wilson; Lumi Cavazos; James Caan
- Cinematography: Robert Yeoman
- Edited by: David Moritz
- Music by: Mark Mothersbaugh
- Production companies: Columbia Pictures; Gracie Films
- Distributed by: Sony Pictures Releasing
- Release date: February 21, 1996
- Running time: 91 minutes
- Country: United States
- Languages: English; Spanish
- Budget: $5 million
- Box office: $560,069

Bottle Rocket is a 1996 American crime comedy film directed by Wes Anderson in his feature film directorial debut. Written by Anderson and Owen Wilson and based on Anderson's 1992 short film of the same name, it marks the acting debuts of brothers Owen and Luke Wilson. Also featured are their older brother Andrew Wilson, Robert Musgrave, Lumi Cavazos, and James Caan. Principal photography took place in various locations throughout Texas.

Though not a commercial success due to its limited release in theaters by Sony Pictures Releasing on February 21, 1996, the film received acclaim from critics and launched the film careers of Anderson and the Wilson brothers. Director Martin Scorsese later named Bottle Rocket one of his top-ten favorite films of the 1990s.

== Plot ==
In Arizona, Dignan "rescues" his friend Anthony from a voluntary psychiatric unit, where he has been staying for self-described exhaustion. Dignan has developed a 75-year plan that he shows to Anthony. The plan is to pull off several heists, and then meet up with a Mr. Henry, a landscaper and part-time criminal known to Dignan.

As a practice heist, the two friends break into Anthony's family's house, stealing specific items from a previously agreed upon list. Critiquing the heist, Dignan reveals that he took a pair of earrings not specified on the list. This upsets Anthony, as he purchased the earrings for his mother as a gift and specifically left them off the list. Anthony visits his little sister at her school and asks her to return the earrings.

Dignan recruits Bob Mapplethorpe as a getaway driver because he is the only person they know with a car. The three of them buy a gun and return to Bob's house to plan their next heist, which will be at a local bookstore. The group bickers as Dignan struggles to describe his intricate plan.

The group steals a small sum of money from the bookstore and goes "on the lam," stopping to stay at a motel. Anthony meets Inez, a Paraguayan motel housekeeper, and the two spark a romance despite a language barrier.

Bob learns that his marijuana crop at home has been discovered by police, and his older brother has been arrested. He leaves to help his brother without telling Dignan. Before leaving the motel themselves, Anthony gives Dignan a sealed envelope to give to Inez. Dignan delivers it to her while she is cleaning a room, not knowing that the envelope has most of his and Anthony's money inside.

As Dignan is leaving, Inez asks a Hispanic employee serving as informal translator to tell him that she loves Anthony. When the translator delivers the message he says, "Tell Anthony I love him." Dignan fails to realize he is speaking for Inez and does not deliver the message.

Dignan steals a car, and he and Anthony continue with the plan. The car breaks down and Anthony reveals that the envelope Dignan gave to Inez contained their cash. They have a confrontation and part ways.

Sometime later, Dignan, who has joined Mr. Henry's gang, tracks Anthony down and they reconcile. Dignan invites him to a heist with Mr. Henry which he accepts on the condition that Bob is allowed in as well.

The four of them plan to rob a safe at a cold storage facility. Mr. Henry becomes a role model for the others, standing up to Bob's abusive brother and tutoring Dignan on success. He invites the trio to a party, and visits them at the Mapplethorpes' house. Anthony learns of Inez's love for him and calls her. Her English has improved and they rekindle their relationship.

The group conducts their heist at the cold storage facility with Applejack and Kumar, accomplices from Mr. Henry's landscaping company. The plan falls apart, with Kumar unable to crack the safe, and Bob accidentally firing his gun, which in turn triggers a cardiac event in Applejack.

While the crew are busy with their heist, Mr. Henry cleans out the expensive furniture from Bob's home and makes off with it.

Anthony and Bob later visit Dignan in prison. While saying goodbye, Dignan begins rattling off an escape plan and tells his friends to get into position for a getaway. After a tense moment, the two realize Dignan is joking. Dignan says to Anthony, "Isn't it funny that you used to be in the nuthouse and now I'm in jail?" as he walks back into the prison.

== Cast ==
- Owen Wilson as Dignan
- Luke Wilson as Anthony Adams
- Robert Musgrave as Bob Mapplethorpe
- James Caan as Abe Henry
- Lumi Cavazos as Inez
- Ned Dowd as Dr. Nichols
- Shea Fowler as Grace
- Haley Miller as Bernice
- Kumar Pallana as Kumar
- Andrew Wilson as Jon Mapplethorpe / Future Man
- Brian Tenenbaum as Clay Murchison
- Stephen Dignan as Rob
- Anna Cifuentes as Carmen
- Donny Caicedo as Rocky
- Jim Ponds as Applejack

== Production ==
=== Short Film ===
In 1992, Wes Anderson directed a 13-minute short film, titled Bottle Rocket. The short was filmed in black and white, and starred Owen, Luke Wilson and Musgrave. The short had a similar plot to the later feature film. The film was screened at the 1993 Sundance Film Festival, where it attracted the attention of filmmaker James L. Brooks (after a recommendation from former Gracie Films CEO Polly Platt), who agreed to finance a full-length version of the short.

=== Writing ===
Brooks met with the writing duo and, although he expressed a liking for the film's tone, concept, and actors, he requested that they rewrite the script for the pitch to Columbia (Gracie's usual choice for distribution). Anderson and Wilson moved into an office in Los Angeles, where they spent 18 months improving the screenplay. The improved script kept most key sequences from the short film while expanding Dignan and Anthony's characterization.

=== Casting ===
It was agreed upon that the Wilsons and Musgrave would remain in their roles. Andrew Wilson, Owen and Luke's brother, was cast as Future Man. Kumar Pallana (whose son ran a Dallas restaurant the brothers often went to) was cast as Kumar. Mexican actress and Golden Globe nominee Lumi Cavazos was cast as hotel employee Inez, a character not in the original script. Columbia Pictures wanted a well-known name to play the character of Mr. Henry. Anderson originally considered Bill Murray (who he collaborated with in his sophomore film Rushmore, among others), but was unable to reach him. Anderson later found out that his agent was also that of James Caan's and was able to secure him in the role.

=== Filming ===
Anderson contacted cinematographer Robert Yeoman, who had previously shot Drugstore Cowboy, a film Anderson had long admired. He sent him a handwritten note, synopsis of the film, and a copy of the short on VHS. The two then had a meeting at the Gracie Films offices. After hitting it off, Yeoman agreed to shoot the film.

Filming began in the DFW area (with the exception of its introduction, which was shot at Camarillo State Mental Hospital in southern California) in late 1994. Many locations from the original short were reused. Most of the film, including the motel sequences, were shot in Hillsboro, while the final heist was filmed at the Texas Ice House in Dallas. The scenes at Bob Mapplethorpe's house were filmed at the John Gillin Residence. Wasco Prison, the fictional jail where Dignan is incarcerated at the end of the film, was named after production designer David Wasco. Anderson met Wasco on the set of Pulp Fiction, where Wasco was working at the time, while meeting with Miramax about funding Bottle Rocket.

The film was shot almost entirely on the Panavision 27mm Primo lens. Anderson and Yeoman were inspired by Rosemary's Baby's lone use of 20mm lenses. Upon learning of this, Columbia demanded that they vary their lenses. To get around this, the team put tape over the lens marking and wrote various focal lengths, while producers remained oblivious.

The team originally wanted to shoot the film in the 2.39 aspect ratio, but the studio refused, and made them do a test comparing it against 1.85. After viewing this test, Columbia said they noticed no substantial difference between the two ratios, and made the crew shoot in 1.85.

During the filming at the hotel, the team encountered an issue: the pool water was far too green. Rather than spend a costly amount on draining and cleaning the pool, Yeoman placed blue gels on the underwater lights to overpower the green tint.

== Release ==
Bottle Rocket's release began with test screenings at the AMC in Santa Monica. A majority of the reactions were negative, with a reported 85 out of 250 audience members walking out before the end of the film. As a result, Anderson went back, re-shot multiple sequences of the film, and wrote a new ending. Much of the funding for these fixes came out of James L. Brooks' pocket.

Columbia and Gracie were satisfied with the changes and opted to submit it to the Sundance Film Festival. Sundance, however, rejected the film despite accepting the short film three years prior. Brooks, furious, wrote a letter to the selectors, saying that they had failed to recognize the talent behind the film.

Bottle Rocket was then submitted to other festivals including Telluride, but was also rejected. Upon hearing of this, Columbia became skeptical of the film's future. They scrapped the marketing plan they had, which would have been targeted towards teenagers and young adults. The film was given a limited release, opening to just 28 theaters domestically, expanding to 49 the following month.

The film, with a budget of $7 million, only grossed $560,226 in its original run, becoming one of Columbia Pictures' biggest flops of all time.

== Reception ==
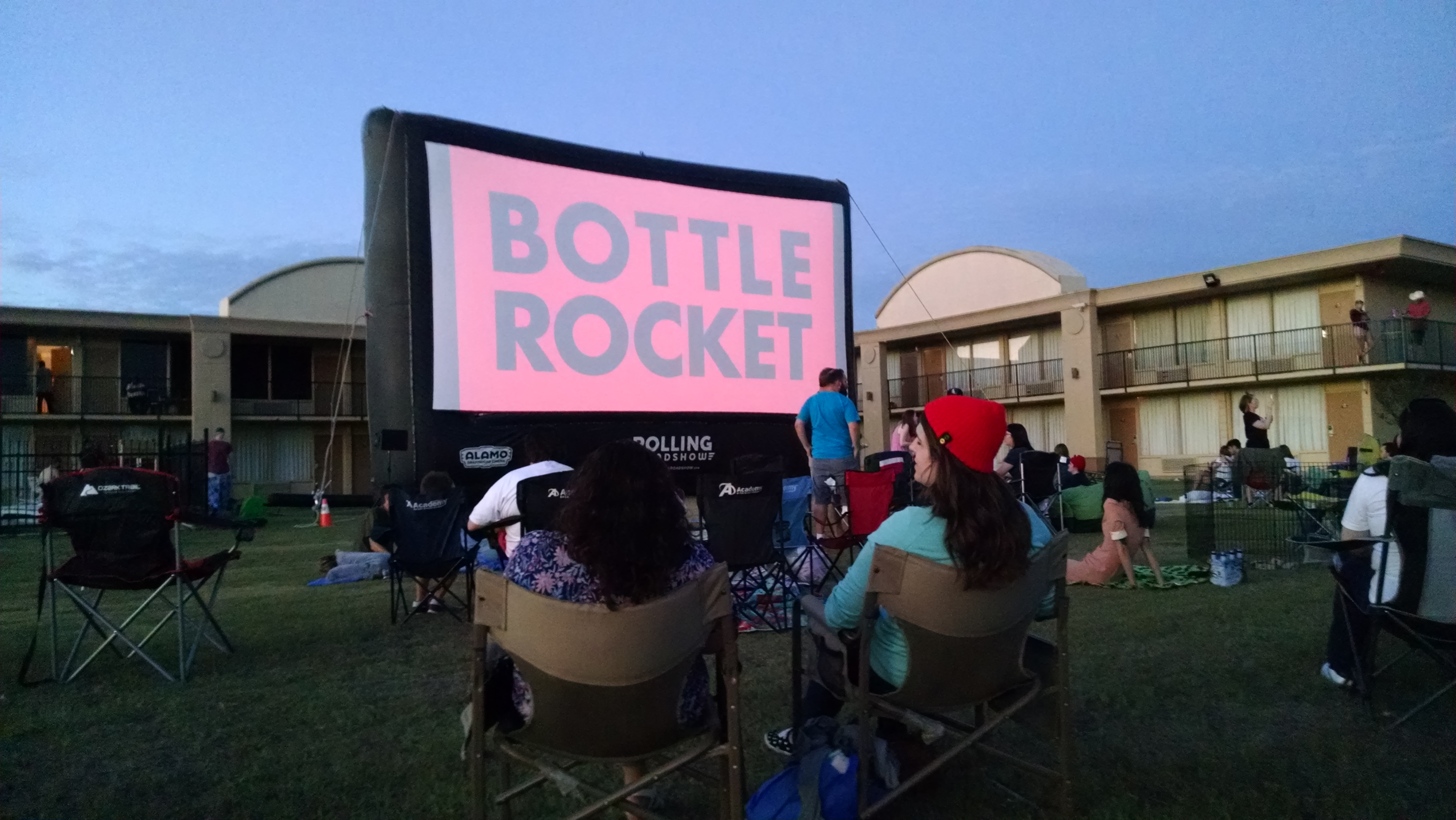
Fans watch a showing in Hillsboro, TX at the motel where much of the movie was filmed.

Bottle Rocket received generally positive reviews from film critics. On Rotten Tomatoes, it has an 86% rating based on 71 reviews, with an average rating of 6.8/10. The site's consensus describes the film as "Reservoir Dogs meets Breathless with a West Texas sensibility". On Metacritic, it has a 66/100 weighted average score based on 24 critics.

After the film failed to achieve commercial success, Owen Wilson considered joining the Marines.

Martin Scorsese is a fan of the film, calling it one of his favorite movies of the 1990s. In a 2000 interview with Esquire, Scorsese praised Wes Anderson for his ability to "convey the simple joys and interactions between people so well and with such richness".

== Home media ==
In 2008, Bottle Rocket was released on DVD and Blu-ray as part of The Criterion Collection. It was released on Ultra HD Blu-ray by Criterion on September 30, 2025, as part of the ten film collection The Wes Anderson Archive: Ten Films, Twenty-Five Years.

== Soundtrack ==
Mark Mothersbaugh, of the new wave band Devo, was hired to compose the film's score. He later became a frequent collaborator of Anderson's.

Bottle Rocket (Original Soundtrack)
