= Amber Arcades =

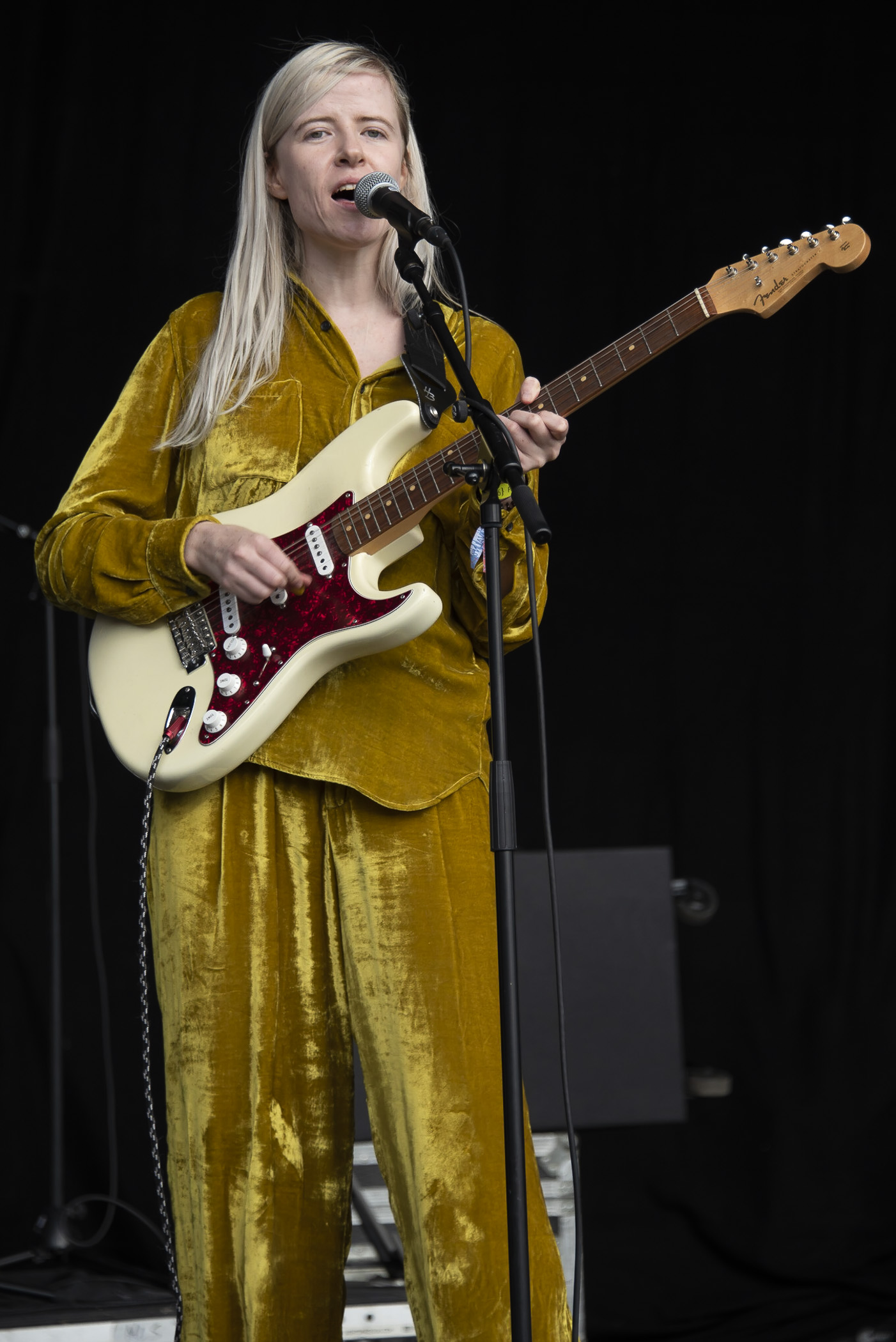
- Arcades performing at Festival No. 6 in Portmeirion, 2018

Background information
- Born: Annelotte de Graaf; 15 December 1988 (age 37); Utrecht, Netherlands
- Genres: Dream pop, Indie pop
- Occupations: Singer, songwriter
- Instruments: Vocals, guitar
- Labels: Heavenly Recordings, Fire Records
- Website: www.amberarcades.net

Amber Arcades is the stage name of Annelotte de Graaf (born 15 December 1988), a Dutch singer-songwriter from Utrecht.

== Biography ==
De Graaf holds a master's degree in law, and worked as an assistant for war crimes tribunals at the United Nations; as of 2016 she held a position "assessing the claims of refugees granted asylum in the Netherlands who are seeking to have their families brought over". Her music career began when she self-recorded an album in New York City, funded by savings she had amassed since her teenage years. Her output attracted the attention of Heavenly Recordings, which released her debut album, Fading Lines, in June 2016. In May 2017, Amber Arcades shared their new ethereal track, "Wouldn’t Even Know" featuring Bill Ryder-Jones. Her second album, European Heartbreak, was released by Heavenly Recordings on 28 September 2018.

Amber Arcades started working with producer Ben Greenberg again during the pandemic for her third album. The album, Barefoot on Diamond Road, featured ten songs produced remotely, mainly between Amsterdam (Annelotte de Graaf), Brooklyn (producer Ben Greenberg) and Los Angeles (drummer Matt Chamberlain). Fire Records released Barefoot on Diamond Road on 10 February 2023.

Amber Arcades previewed some of the new songs on a UK tour ahead of the album release, during Independent Venue Week; a seven date tour together with Hater and Thala, two acts who are also on Fire Records. Amber Arcades returns to SXSW, in Austin, Texas, for several showcases. In the Netherlands, Amber Arcades announced a release tour throughout the country, a co-headlining tour with Robin Kester in March and April., followed by a four-date tour through Italy in May. Amber Arcades plays the Lowlands Festival in August, 2023.

== Discography ==
- Amber Arcades EP (2013)
- Patiently EP (2015)
- Fading Lines (Heavenly Recordings, 2016)
- Cannonball EP (Heavenly Recordings, 2017)
- European Heartbreak (Heavenly Recordings, 2018)
- Barefoot on Diamond Road (Fire Records, 2023)
