= Bonde do Rolê =

Brazilian musical group

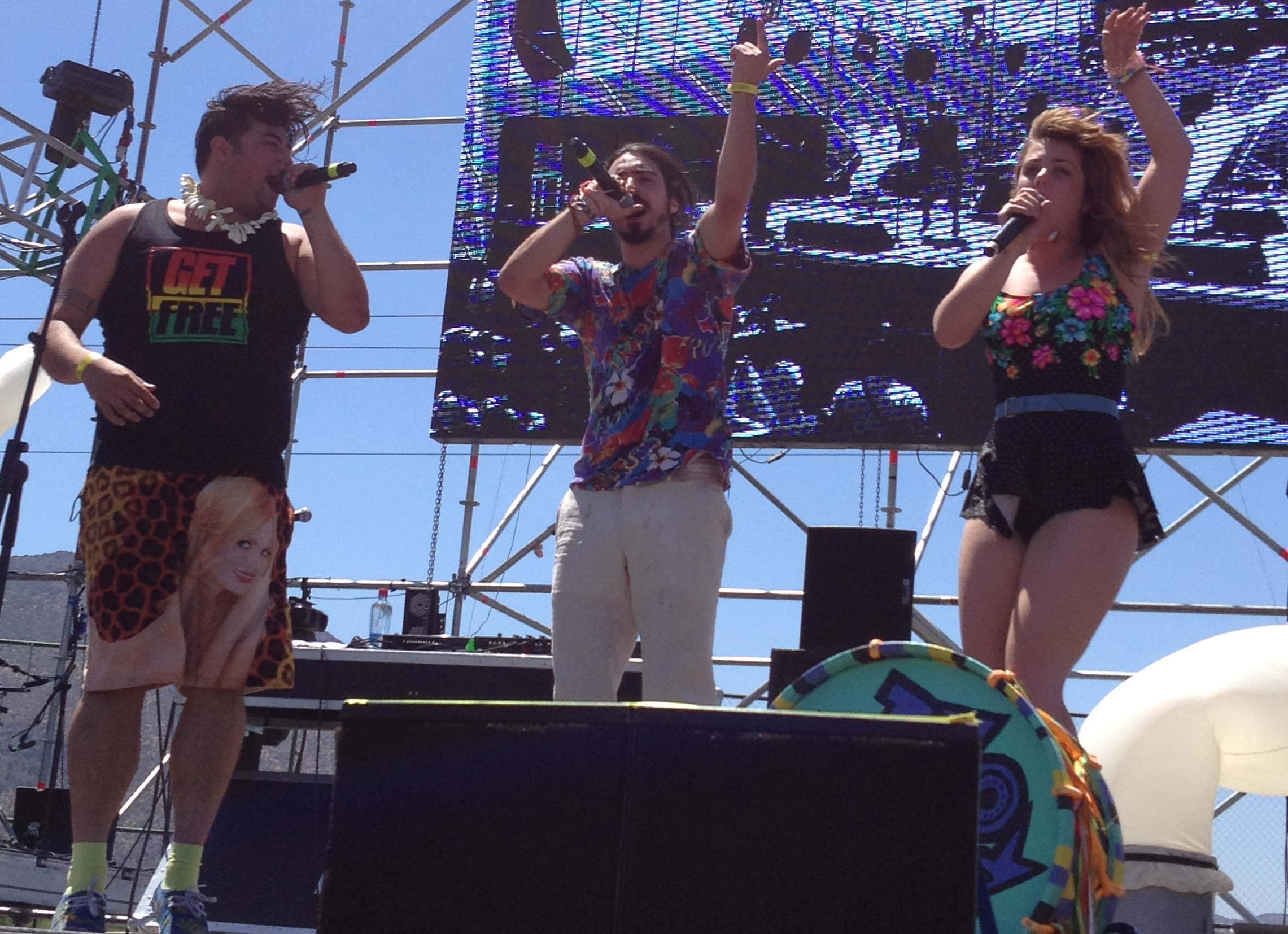
- Bonde do Rolê

Background information
- Origin: Curitiba, Paraná, Brazil
- Genres: Baile funk Dance music Electronic music
- Years active: 2005–2007; 2008-2015
- Labels: Domino Records, Mad Decent
- Members: DJ Gorky; Pedro D'Eyrot; Laura Taylor
- Past members: Marina Ribatski; Ana Bernardino
- Website: Official Website

Bonde do Rolê (Brazilian Portuguese pronunciation: [ˈbõdʒi du ʁoˈle]) was a Brazilian funk carioca-influenced electropop group from Curitiba, Paraná state, and consisted of MC's Pedro D'Eyrot, Laura Taylor, and DJ/MC Rodrigo Gorky. In 2006, Rolling Stone described the group as "Brazilian Party Starters" and one of the "Top 10 Bands to Watch".

Bonde do Rolê started in Curitiba in the south of Brazil, mixing riffs (ranging from the Scorpions' “Rock You Like a Hurricane” to Alice in Chains' “Man in the Box”) with funk carioca (also known as Brazilian funk). The trio did its first major tour in 2006, with CSS (Cansei de Ser Sexy) and in 2007 released their debut album, With Lasers. Bonde do Rolê released their third album "Tropical/Bacanal" on July 31, 2012.

== History ==
=== Beginnings ===
Originally, the band was signed to Domino in 2006. "We just started making music out of fun—we didn't have any intentions to work professionally with music", said Rodrigo Gorky. Producer Diplo first found out about the band through their MySpace account and pushed them using his label, Mad Decent. In March 2006, Rolling Stone picked the band as one of the "10 Bands to Watch", where they were described as "Brazilian party starters”. The following month the New York Times praised the band's work as well.

=== With Lasers ===
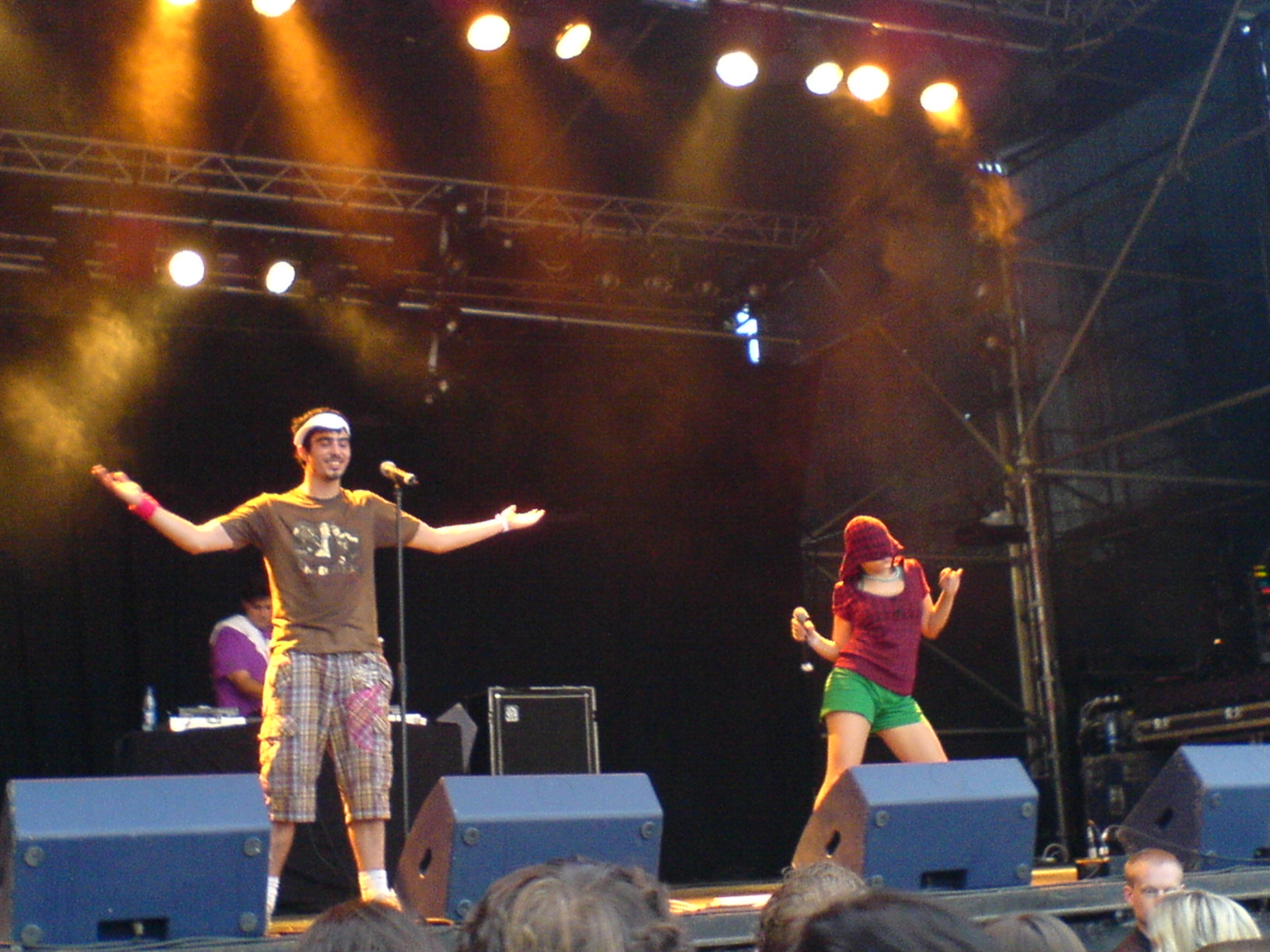
Bonde do Rolê performing in Oslo, Norway

In mid-2007, through Domino Records Bonde do Rolê released their debut album With Lasers. Tracks from the debut album have been used in various media, the single, "Solta o Frango" (Brazilian slang for "enjoy and go crazy") was used widely: it was used in a worldwide campaign for Nokia, in a commercial for Ugly Betty, it was featured on the soundtrack of Electronic Arts game FIFA 08 and in the 2008 film The Ruins. GQ used the song "Office Boy" for the behind-the-scenes photoshoot of actress Jessica Alba by photographer Terry Richardson.

The song "Gasolina" was featured on an Australian advertisement for Bonds underwear. The lyrics used in the commercial caused some offense to Portuguese speakers in Australia, causing the advertisement to be recut with an instrumental version of the song even though "Gasolina" got picked by Domino Records as the single because it did not have bad language.

In December 2007, Bonde do Rolê cancelled gigs in Dublin, Ireland, the UK and their Australian tour amidst speculation that the band was experiencing internal difficulties and were on the verge of a lineup change. On December 12, Gorky and Pedro announced on a MySpace bulletin that Marina had left the band. In February 2008, the two remaining members of the band, in search of a new singer, launched a contest in association with MTV Brazil. The band now consists of Gorky, Pedro and Laura Taylor.

In 2008, the band toured making up for all the cancelled dates in the past, including the Coachella Valley Music and Arts Festival 2008, We Love Sounds Festival in [Australia] and others. Also, in 2008 the band was a nominee for the Band of the Year and Song of the Year categories at the Brazilian MTV Video Music Awards, and performed a medley live at the show.

=== 2011 - Present: Tropical/Bacanal ===
In their second studio album, Tropical/Bacanal, Bonde do Rolê worked with a variety of producers, including Filip Nikolic of Poolside, DJ Chernobyl (who also worked on their first record), Diplo, Switch, Boys Noize among others. In this album “they have left the gimmick of funk behind to work on a mélange of all styles of Brazilian modern music and turned it on its head” says Diplo. Tropical/Bacanal was influenced by many different sounds across the world, including some rap elements on the album as well. Featuring artists like Das Racist, Jamaican MC Ce'Cile and Poolside, critics rave about the diversity and quirkiness of this second album without former member Marina.

In a 2012 interview with Rolling Stone Brazil, Gorky mentioned, (translated) “if I had to draw, this album would be like a sun with a happy face, and the former was a sad moon face”.

The album was released July 31, 2012.

== Discography ==
=== Albums ===
- 2006 – Baterias do Poder (self released)
- 2007 – With Lasers (Domino Records)
- 2012 – Tropical/Bacanal

=== Singles ===
- 2006 "Melô do Tabaco" (Mad Decent)
- 2007 "Marina Gasolina" (Domino Records)
- 2007 "Solta o Frango"/"James Bonde" (Slag Records/Mad Decent) #14 UK indie
- 2007 "Office Boy" (Domino Records) #75 UK
- 2008 "Gasolina" (Mad Decent)
- 2012 "Kilo" (Mad Decent)
- 2012 "Brazilian Boys" (Mad Decent)

=== Remixes ===
- Cansei de Ser Sexy – A la la (Bonde do Rolê remix)
- Edu K – Hot Mama (Bonde do Rolê remix)
- Tony Allen – Awa Na Re (Bonde do Rolê remix)
- Edu K – Sex-O-Matic (Bonde do Rolê remix)
- Architecture In Helsinki – Heart It Races (Bonde do Rolê remix)
- Gameboy/Gamegirl – Fruit Salad (Bonde do Rolê remix)
- Mika – Big Girl (Bonde do Rolê remix)
- Lenni Cesar – Morris Park (Bonde do Rolê remix)
- Brodinski – Divine Gosa
- Major Lazer – Get Free (Bonde do Rolê remix)

== Videos ==
- Solta o Frango official video
- Office Boy official video
- Office Boy Live On UK's Transmission, Channel 4
- Bonde do Role at MTV's VMB 2008
- Bonde Do Role show on MTV Brasil
- Bonde do Role on myspace
- Domino Records
- Bonde do Role's Converse shoes
- Bonde do Role give Smirnoff a tour of Rio

=== Featured Articles and Interviews ===
- Cover issue of the fader magazine
- BBC.co.uk, Collective magazine
- Guardian Unlimited, "Bonde Do Role, Bonde Do Role With Lasers"
- Guardian Unlimited, New Band of the Day: No 60: Bonde Do Role
- - Caught In The Crossfire - Interview
- Radio Nowhere Ola's Kool Kitchen
