= Thunder, Lightning, Strike =

Studio album by the Go! Team
- Released: 13 September 2004
- Recorded: 2004
- Studios: Jan and Ed's basement (Swansea, Wales)
- Genres: Indie rock; alternative dance; alternative hip-hop; indie electronic; lo-fi
- Length: 35:46
- Label: Memphis Industries
- Producers: The Go! Team; Gareth Parton

The Go! Team chronology
Thunder, Lightning, Strike (2004)	Proof of Youth (2007)

Singles from Thunder, Lightning, Strike
- 1. "Junior Kickstart" Released: 26 May 2003; 2. "The Power Is On" Released: 19 July 2004; 3. "Ladyflash" Released: 22 November 2004; 4. "Bottle Rocket" Released: 26 September 2005

Thunder, Lightning, Strike is the debut studio album by English band the Go! Team. It was initially released on label Memphis Industries on 13 September 2004, but was reworked to avoid legal issues with samples, and re-released in October 2005.

== Background ==
The album was the project of founder member Ian Parton, who over the course of 2003 recorded demos and musical ideas after work, onto many dozens of cassettes using a lo-fi 4-track recorder, and titled each tape with a potential song name idea. Each track on the album was created by combining five or six different ideas from this large assortment of tapes, trying out different chorus sections from one with the verse section of another, to give the music an overall feeling of constantly switching radio channels. 'Get It Together' was the first track Parton created where he felt he'd got the juxtaposition of differing styles within one song right, giving him the template and direction for the rest of the album.

== Recording ==
Recording took place in both the garage and kitchen of Parton's parents' house in Swansea while they were away on holiday, with him playing all live instruments himself (as at that time there were no other members of the band). The album was co-produced by his sound engineer brother Gareth Parton, who helped Ian set up the makeshift home recording facility in Wales, and later mixed the tracks at The Fortress Studios and Bluestone in London.

== 'Legal' and 'Illegal' versions ==
The original 2004 Memphis Industries release of the album (sometimes referred to as the 'Illegal version') had none of its many samples cleared, as Parton didn't expect the album to attract much attention. However Thunder, Lightning, Strike received wide critical acclaim and was later nominated for the 2005 Mercury Music Prize. Thereupon a 'legally clean' version of the album was painstakingly recreated by the Parton brothers, containing only cleared or interpolated samples, and rewritten, resung lyrics, all under the guidance of a legal musicologist. Junior Kickstart, Bottle Rocket and Ladyflash were among the most heavily reworked tracks, whilst Get It Together was one of a few tracks that remained untouched. This revised 'legal' version of the album was re-released in the United Kingdom and the United States by Columbia Records in October 2005, with two additional bonus tracks. The album peaked at number 48 on the UK Albums Chart in February 2006, some 18 months after its original release.

== Reception ==
Professional ratings
Aggregate scores
Source	Rating
Metacritic	86/100
Review scores
Source	Rating
AllMusic	5/5 stars
Blender	4/5 stars
Entertainment Weekly	A−
Mojo	3/5 stars
NME	9/10
Pitchfork	8.7/10
Resident Advisor	4.5/5
Rolling Stone	4/5 stars
Slant Magazine	4.5/5 stars
The Village Voice	A−

Reception to Thunder, Lightning, Strike was very positive. On review aggregator site Metacritic, the album has a score of 86, indicating "universal acclaim".

Pitchfork placed Thunder, Lightning, Strike at number eight in their list of the top albums of 2004 and at number 171 on their list of the top 200 albums of the 2000s.

Concluding the review for AllMusic, Tim Sendra claimed that, "The Go! Team is widescreen in a pan-and-scan world, a sparkling rejoinder to purists and spoilsports everywhere and more fun than recess on the last day of school. Cinematic, fantastic, and essential to all who want their music larger than life and rambunctious, Thunder, Lightning, Strike is the kind of record that makes you glad to be alive. What could be better than that?"

== Anniversary reissue and tour ==
The band reissued the record and launched a Fall 2024 tour in the UK and US to celebrate the LP's 20th anniversary. The new album edition appeared on 13 September from Memphis Industries and included a bonus disc of Parton's original CD-R versions of the songs.

== Track listing ==
All tracks are written by The Go! Team, except where noted.

Original release
No.	Title	Writer(s)	Length
1.	"Panther Dash"	The Go! Team; Paul Cooksey	2:46
2.	"Ladyflash"	The Go! Team; David Reeves; Lamont Dozier; Brian Holland; Eddie Holland; Billy Davis; Raynard Miner; Carl Smith; Lloyd Pinchback; B. Robinson; C. Robinson	4:10
3.	"Feelgood by Numbers"		1:58
4.	"The Power Is On"		3:14
5.	"Get It Together"		3:25
6.	"Junior Kickstart"	The Go! Team; Galt MacDermot; James Rado; Gerome Ragni	3:35
7.	"Air Raid GTR"		0:38
8.	"Bottle Rocket"	The Go! Team; Nkechi Egenamba; Shirley Elliston	3:43
9.	"Friendship Update"		4:00
10.	"Huddle Formation"	The Go! Team; Egenamba	3:12
11.	"Everyone's a V.I.P. to Someone"	The Go! Team; Fred Neil; Laura Nyro	4:58

Re-release
No.	Title	Writer(s)	Length
1.	"Panther Dash"	The Go! Team; Cooksey	2:50
2.	"Ladyflash"	The Go! Team; Reeves; Dozier; B. Holland; E. Holland; Davis; Miner; Smith; Pinchback; B. Robinson; C. Robinson	4:16
3.	"Feelgood by Numbers"		1:56
4.	"The Power Is On"		3:14
5.	"Get It Together"		3:28
6.	"We Just Won't Be Defeated"		2:45
7.	"Junior Kickstart"	The Go! Team; MacDermot; Rado; Ragni	3:32
8.	"Air Raid GTR"		0:39
9.	"Bottle Rocket"	The Go! Team; Egenamba; Elliston	3:32
10.	"Friendship Update"		4:00
11.	"Hold Yr Terror Close"		2:18
12.	"Huddle Formation"	The Go! Team; Egenamba	3:11
13.	"Everyone's a V.I.P. to Someone"	The Go! Team; Neil; Nyro	5:08

Sample credits

- "Ladyflash" contains samples of "The DMX Will Rock You (Rap Mix)", written by David Reeves; "Come See About Me", written by Lamont Dozier, Brian Holland, and Eddie Holland; "I Can't Rest", written by Billy Davis, Raynard Miner, and Carl Smith; Wild Style; and "Ashley's Roachclip", written by Lloyd Pinchback.
- "The Power Is On" contains samples of Black Magic; The Clash: Westway to the World; and Gimme an 'F'.
- "Junior Kickstart" contains samples of "Aquarius", written by Galt MacDermot, James Rado, and Gerome Ragni.
- "Bottle Rocket" contains samples of "Soul Time", written by Shirley Ellis.
- "Huddle Formation" contains samples of Gimme an 'F' and Black Panther chants.
- "Everyone's a V.I.P. to Someone" contains samples of "Everybody's Talkin'", written by Fred Neil; and "Stoned Soul Picnic", written by Laura Nyro.

== Personnel ==
Credits for Thunder, Lightning, Strike adapted from album liner notes.

- The Go! Team – performance, production
- Ceri Amphlett – sleeve design
- Mike Palmer – mastering
- Gareth Parton – production
- Rob Winterson – scratching on "Get It Together"

== Charts ==
Chart (2005–06)	Peak position
Scottish Albums (Official Charts)	40
UK Albums (Official Charts)	48
UK Independent Albums (Official Charts)	5

== Certifications ==
Region	Certification	Certified units/sales
United Kingdom (BPI)	Gold	100,000^{^}
^{^} Shipments figures based on certification alone.
