= The Go! Team =

British band

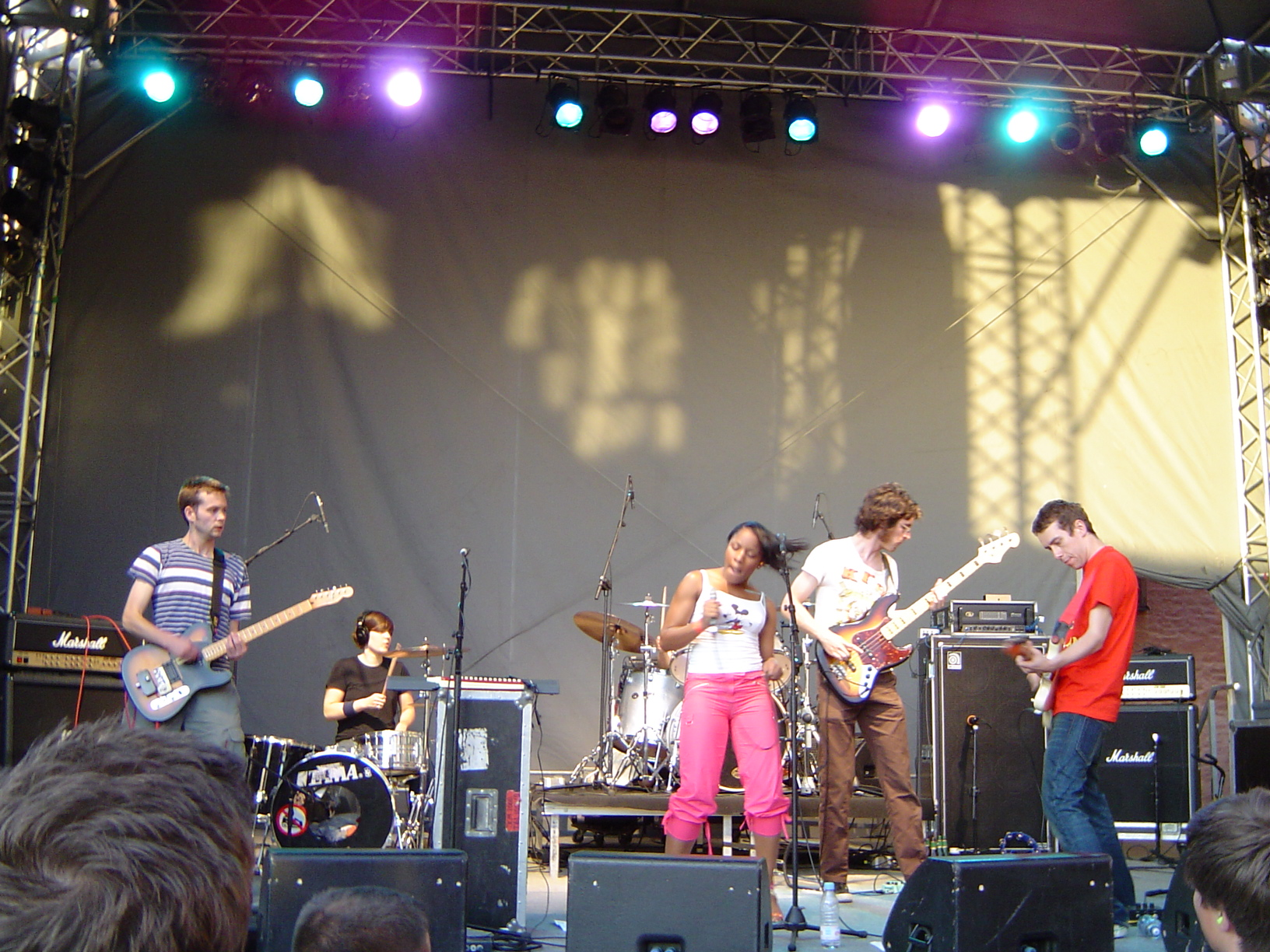
- The Go! Team playing in Stockholm, 2004

Background information
- Origin: Brighton, East Sussex, England
- Genres: Indie rock, indie pop, alternative hip hop, alternative dance, indietronica, neo-psychedelia, pep band, instrumental, plunderphonics
- Works: The Go! Team discography
- Years active: 2000–present
- Labels: current: Memphis Industries, Beatball, Shock, Tearbridge/Avex; previous: Columbia Records, Pickled Egg Records, V:Room/Stubbie, Cooperative, Sub Pop, Secret City
- Members: Ian Parton; Sam Dook; Ninja; Niadzi Muzira; Adam Znaidi; Jaleesa Gemerts; Kate Walker
- Past members: Jamie Bell; Silke Steidinger; Chi Fukami Taylor; Kaori Tsuchida; Simone Odaranile; Cheryl Pinero; Angela "Maki" Won-Yin Mak; Viva Msimang; Deanna Wilhelm
- Website: thegoteam.co.uk

The Go! Team are an English indie rock band from Brighton, East Sussex. The band initially began as a solo project conceived by Ian Parton; however, after the unexpected success of the Go! Team's debut album, Thunder, Lightning, Strike, Parton recruited band members to play for live performances and subsequent albums. Musically, the band combines indie rock and garage rock with a mixture of funk and Bollywood soundtracks, double Dutch chants, old school hip hop and distorted guitars. Their songs are a mix of live instrumentation and samples from various sources. The band's vocals also vary between performances: while live vocals are handled mostly by lead vocalist Ninja, vocals on record also feature sampled and guest voices.

== History ==
=== 2000–2004: Origins ===
The Go! Team began as a solo project conceived by documentary film director Ian Parton, who wanted to create music incorporating Sonic Youth-style guitars, double Dutch chants, Bollywood soundtracks, old school hip hop and electro. These ideas led towards the recording of his first extended play, Get It Together EP, which was released in 2000 by Pickled Egg Records. The EP received regular airplay by DJ John Peel, one of the original BBC Radio 1 DJs.

=== 2004–2007: Thunder, Lightning, Strike ===
The Go! Team's first album, Thunder, Lightning, Strike, was released in the UK and Europe on the Memphis Industries label in September 2004. The album was recorded at Parton's parents' house while they were away on holiday, with him playing all live instruments himself. The album was co-produced and mixed by Ian's brother Gareth Parton at The Fortress Studios and Bluestone in London. Prior to the album's release, Ian Parton had failed to clear any of the samples used in the album, believing it wouldn't attract much attention. However, the album received widespread critical acclaim upon release, and the album was nominated for the Mercury Prize in 2005. Following the album's unexpected success, the Parton brothers later had to work with a musicologist to write around or recreate samples they could not use. The revised album was reissued with two additional bonus tracks in the United Kingdom and the United States the following year. The album peaked at number 48 on the UK Albums Chart in February 2006.

In June 2004, Ian Parton recruited a band to play the Accelerator Festival in Sweden after having been asked to play when no band existed. The new members of the band included British rapper Ninja, who took the role of lead vocalist; guitarist and drummer Sam Dook; drummer Chi Fukami Taylor; bassist Jamie Bell; and musician Silke Steidinger. Steidinger was later replaced by multi-instrumentalist Kaori Tschuida in late 2005. The live band is a "separate entity" to the original studio vision, as the performances became radically different from the recordings, particularly due to Ninja's freestyled vocals over what had been instrumental studio tracks.

The band's popularity increased with the re-issue of "Ladyflash" in the UK, resulting in national primetime airplay on radio stations such as BBC Radio 1, Xfm and the Atlanta, US based 99X. The song "Get It Together" from Thunder, Lightning, Strike also received popularity, being featured in trailers for the video game LittleBigPlanet. The track "The Power Is On" from Thunder, Lightning, Strike was included in "The Pitchfork 500: Our Guide to the Greatest Songs from Punk to Present."

=== 2007–2008: Proof of Youth ===
On 13 May 2007, the Go! Team announced the release of their new single and subsequent album on their website. The album's lead single, "Grip Like a Vice", was released on 2 July 2007, and the new album, called Proof of Youth, was released on 10 September in the UK and a day later in the US. The album featured samples and live band recordings, as well as special guests such as Chuck D, Solex, and ex-Bonde do Rolê singer Marina Ribatski. The second single from Proof of Youth, "Doing It Right", received daytime radio play from BBC Radio 1 and soundtracked the BBC's launch of the iPlayer.

The album received mostly positive reviews from critics; Rob Mitchum of Pitchfork gave the album a 7.2 out of 10, expressing "Proof of Youth mostly recaptures the enthusiasm and unique sensibility of Thunder, Lightning, Strike, further filling that niche for lo-fi sample-based old-school-noise-rap we never knew we needed filling." Jeff Weiss of Stylus Magazine gave Proof of Youth a "B", considering the album a "satisfying sophomore effort", but criticising the band's inability to sonically expand from Thunder, Lightning, Strike.

A stand-alone single "Milk Crisis" was released via free download on 21 July 2008. They later released a 2-disc limited edition of the record with b-sides of the album including "Milk Crisis", "Phantom Broadcast", "A Version of Myself", and a remix of "Grip Like a Vice" by Black Affair.

=== 2008–2012: Rolling Blackouts, hiatus ===
In an interview with Stereogum in August 2008, Parton spoke about recording The Go! Team's third album and the direction he was going in for the project. He wanted to make music that "flips fidelity within the same song, and make it flow like a song should", his idea of "schizo music".

On 5 August 2010, the band announced a collaboration with Satomi Matsuzaki of Deerhoof, entitled "Secretary Song", and the track listing for the new album Rolling Blackouts was confirmed on 28 October 2010. The album's first single, "Buy Nothing Day", was released on 24 January 2011 in both the UK and US on 7" vinyl. The track, which features vocals by Bethany Cosentino of Best Coast, is backed with a cover version of Betty and Karen's "I"m Not Satisfied" sung by French singer Soko. The single was A-listed for five consecutive weeks on BBC 6 Music in the UK as well as picking up "most requested" status on Triple J Radio in Australia.

Rolling Blackouts was released on 31 January 2011. The album received 4/5 reviews in a number of UK publications including Q magazine, Uncut, The Times and The Fly. Throughout 2011 and 2012, the band went on tour internationally to promote the album.

On 5 September 2011, during a Q&A at the Hot Press chatroom, Parton and Ninja confirmed that the current band line-up would split following the 2011-12 tour to focus on other projects. Reflecting on the band's decision to disband, Parton stated, "[We] kind of decided it was the end of the line. [...] It was getting really hard to keep it together; people were having kids, there were side projects going on, and honestly, we'd kind of done everything that we wanted to. I knew I was going to keep on making music somehow, and it was kind of liberating to know that I could basically do what I wanted."

=== 2014–2018: The Scene Between and Semicircle ===
On 11 February 2014, a fourteen-second-long video was uploaded to the Go! Team's website and YouTube, Facebook and Twitter accounts showing a montage of images with new music playing in the background. On 18 December 2014, the Go! Team announced their return by uploading a trailer for their new album. The track list and title of the album, The Scene Between, was announced on 6 January 2015.

The Scene Between was entirely written and produced by Parton himself, excluding the vocals. Despite this, Parton retained the Go! Team's name on the album: "I started the band myself, and did the first album alone, so I felt like I had the right to keep calling it the Go! Team." The album's sound was a departure from the previous two albums, which were more band-oriented and groove-based. Instead, Parton put a bigger emphasis on vocal melodies for the album: "The original plan was to write a whole bunch of songs that I thought were melodically interesting - kind of curvy, kind of dense. From there, I was going to try to build the songs out of chords I'd taken from loads of different places; I'd get the G from a sixties psych record, or the B from an old funk track, or something. [...] To some extent, I've always worked that way, but I wanted to pursue that properly this time, and it actually turned out a lot more subtle than I thought it would. It's like a balance between everything I've always loved, musically." The album features vocals from relatively unknown vocalists; Parton wanted to avoid high-profile guest appearances on the album, as opposed to the previous two albums, and put out open calls on the Drowned in Sound message board.

The Scene Between was released through Memphis Industries on 24 March 2015 and received positive reviews from critics. Ian Cohen of Pitchfork spoke positively of Parton's "chaotic, buzzing production" and gave the album a 7.2 out of 10. Alex McLevy of The A.V. Club gave the album an "A-"; McLevy also praised Parton's production and choice of vocalists, writing that "the whole album feels like a celebration of the giddy uncertainties of youth." The band went on tour to support the fourth album with a new band line-up, which notably included the return of guitarist Sam Dook and lead vocalist Ninja. In an interview with The Line of Best Fit, Parton expressed of Ninja's return, "A live show without [Ninja] would be a completely different ball game, so I'm glad we've got her; I know she loves doing it." The new line-up also included bassist Cheryl Pinero, drummer Simone Odaranile, and multi-instrumentalist Angela "Maki" Won-Yin Mak.

On 11 October 2017, the Go! Team announced the release of Semicircle, their fifth full-length LP. Semicircle was released on 19 January 2018. The album mainly featured vocals from Ninja and Maki, as well as guest vocals from the Detroit Youth Choir, Julie Margat, Darenda Weaver, and Amber Arcades. Exclaim! scored the album a 7 out of 10, stating that the album "is a team effort, and all the better for it."

=== 2019–present: Get Up Sequences ===
In March 2021, the Go! Team announced a new band line-up and the title of their sixth album, Get Up Sequences Part One, which was subsequently released on 2 July 2021. The group had begun recording for the new album since 2019. In a 2021 interview, Parton revealed that he experienced hearing loss in his right ear during the recording of Get Up: "I woke up one Thursday in October 2019 and my hearing was different in some way [...] I seem to remember listening to music was bordering on unbearable." He further added that "the trauma of losing my hearing gave the music a different dimension for me and it transformed the album into more of a life raft."

In September 2022, the Go! Team released a new single, "Divebomb", followed by releasing their seventh album, Get Up Sequences Part Two, on 3 February 2023.

In July 2024, the band announced a reissue of their debut album Thunder, Lightning, Strike and a Fall 2024 tour to celebrate the 20th anniversary of the record. The new edition of the record, which was released on September 13 from Memphis Industries, included a bonus disc of Parton’s original CD-R versions of the songs on both CD and vinyl reissues. The band also began releasing a series of remixes and reworks of tracks from Thunder, Lightning, Strike throughout the year by a variety of bands and artists, including The Pastels, The Orielles, Louie Zong, Cornershop, Los Bitchos and CV Vision. During the Fall 2024 tour, the band was joined on the tour by trumpeter Kate Walker of the London band My Fat Pony. The band was joined on U.S. dates by Montreal dance-punk group La Sécurité.

== Live band members ==
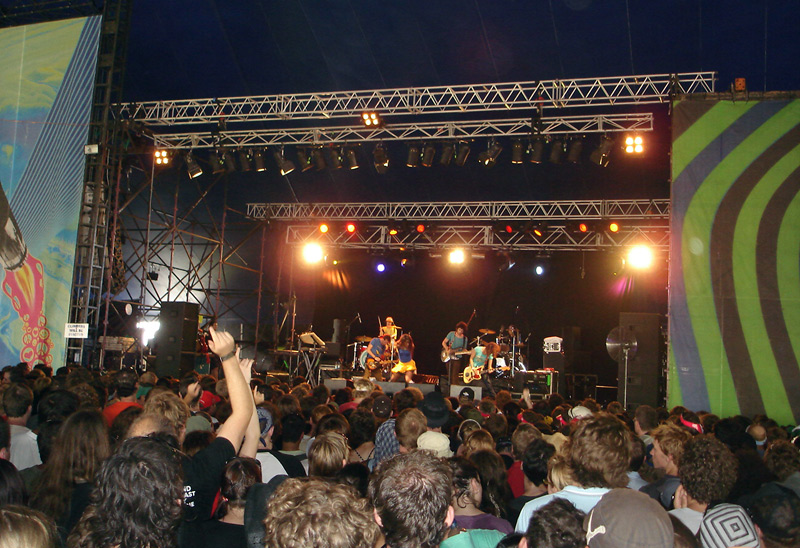
The Go! Team playing at the Big Day Out in Melbourne, Australia

=== Current members ===
- Ian Parton – vocals, guitars, harmonica, piano, drums, triangle, glockenspiel, percussion (2000–present)
- Sam Dook – guitars, banjo, drums, percussion (2004–present)
- Ninja – vocals, drums, percussion, melodica, recorder (2004–present)
- Niadzi Muzira – guitars, vocals, percussion, melodica, recorder (2018–present)
- Adam Znaidi – bass guitar, drums, piano (2018–present)
- Jaleesa Gemerts – drums, percussion (2022–present)
- Kate Walker – trumpet, melodica, vocals (2024–present)

=== Former members ===
- Jamie Bell – bass guitar, piano, glockenspiel (2004–2012)
- Silke Steidinger – drums, electric guitar, melodica (2004–2005)
- Chi Fukami Taylor – drums, percussion, vocals (2004–2012)
- Kaori Tsuchida – guitars, vocals, melodica, glockenspiel, percussion (2005–2012)
- Simone Odaranile – drums, percussion (2015–2022)
- Cheryl Pinero – bass guitar, vocals (2015–2016)
- Angela "Maki" Won-Yin Mak – vocals, guitars, melodica, recorder, percussion (2015–2018)
- Viva Msimang – trumpet, vocals (2018)
- Deanna Wilhelm – trumpet, vocals, percussion (2018–2024)

== Discography ==
=== Studio albums ===
- Thunder, Lightning, Strike (2004)
- Proof of Youth (2007)
- Rolling Blackouts (2011)
- The Scene Between (2015)
- Semicircle (2018)
- Get Up Sequences Part One (2021)
- Get Up Sequences Part Two (2023)
