= Commontime (album) =

Studio album by Field Music
- Released: 5 February 2016
- Genres: Indie rock; indie pop; chamber pop; art rock; art pop; sophisti-pop
- Length: 57:55
- Label: Memphis Industries
- Producer: Field Music

Field Music chronology
Music for Drifters (2015)	Commontime (2016)	Open Here (2018)

Singles from Commontime
- 1. "The Noisy Days Are Over" Released: 13 October 2015; 2. "Disappointed" Released: 12 January 2016

Commontime is the fifth studio album by the English rock band Field Music. It was released by Memphis Industries on 5 February 2016. The album has been described as the band's most accessible to date, and encompasses a wide range of genres and influences, including the funk style that Field Music's David Brewis previously explored on Old Fears, an album by his side project School of Language. Commontime has a stronger pop music sound than Field Music's previous albums, in part inspired by David and Peter Brewis’ children listening to a lot of Hall & Oates and American number-one singles.

As with other Field Music works, Commontime features unique song structures, unconventional instrumentation, and unusual time signatures that occasionally shift mid-song. It also includes interweaving vocals and sophisticated harmonies, with more instances of the Brewis brothers singing together than past Field Music albums, as well as prominent use of strings and brass instruments. The album features a wider array of supporting musicians than on the band's previous works, including the band's original keyboardist Andrew Moore, Peter's wife Jennie Brewis on vocals, and backup singer Liz Corney from the band Cornshed Sisters.

Commontime was the first album released by Field Music since David and Peter Brewis became fathers, and several of its songs are about parenthood and family, as well as the shift in responsibility and priorities imposed by children. Other songs are about coming to terms with ageing and middle age, and although Commontime is less overtly political than previous Field Music albums, the Brewis brothers said the album conveys a message that experiencing joy and fun despite difficult political times is in itself an act of political defiance.

Recorded at Field Music's home studio in Sunderland, the music for Commontime was written and recorded in spontaneous bursts over six months. "The Noisy Days Are Over" is the first single from the album, followed by “Disappointed”. The musician Prince wrote about the first single on Twitter, which generated media attention for the album and band. Field Music undertook their first American tour since 2010 in support of Commontime, though the U.S. portion of the tour was shortened at the band's request due to the challenges from parenthood. The album became the first Field Music album to reach the Top 40 in the UK Albums Chart. Commontime received positive reviews, with an aggregated Metacritic rating of 79/100, and appeared on a handful of year-end lists of the best albums of 2016. Several reviewers compared Commontime to the work of such artists as David Bowie, Talking Heads, XTC, Hot Chip, and Peter Gabriel.

== Background ==
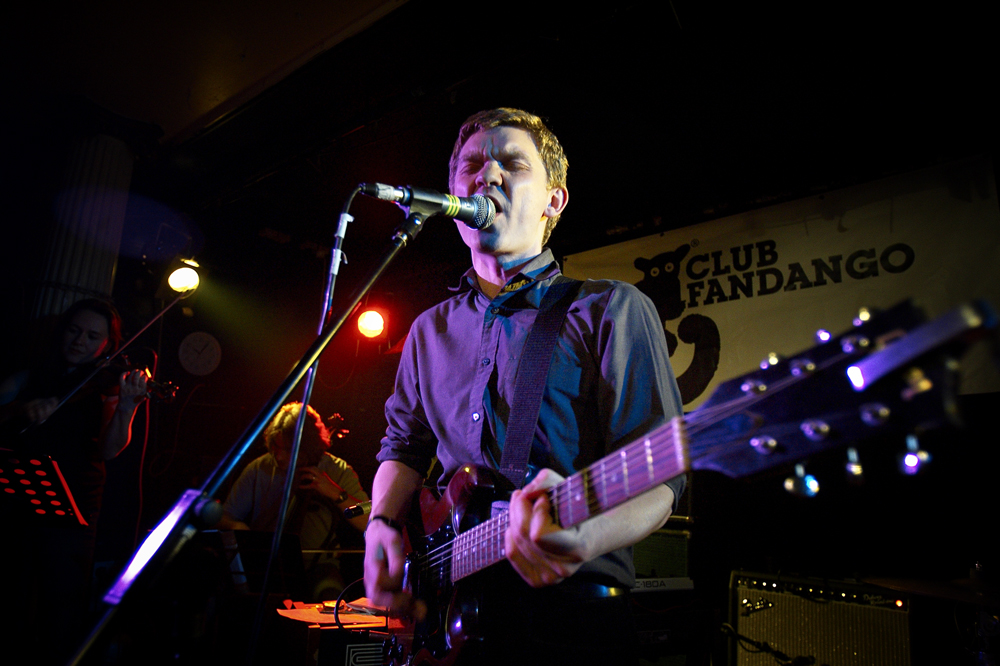
Peter Brewis, one half of the rock band Field Music, which also includes his brother David.

Commontime was the fifth studio album by Field Music, the English rock band consisting of the brothers David and Peter Brewis. Released through its label Memphis Industries, it was the band's first album since Music for Drifters (2015), a soundtrack Field Music recorded for the 1929 silent film Drifters, and the band's first traditional studio album since the release of Plumb in 2012. During the four years between Plumb and Commontime, David and Peter Brewis released or participated in a number of solo works and collaborations: David released a 2014 album called Old Fears through his side project School of Language, and Peter Brewis collaborated with Paul Smith of the band Maxïmo Park on the album Frozen by Sight (2014). Additionally, Field Music released an album of covers in 2012 called Field Music Play..., and worked with the band Slug on their 2015 album Ripe.

David said of the hiatus: "As much fun as we might have had on our own or collaborating, we missed just spending time in the studio, the two of us, trying things out together." Commontime featured a wider array of supporting musicians than past Field Music albums, including the band's original keyboardist Andrew Moore, Peter's wife Jennie Brewis on vocals, and backup singer Liz Corney, from the band Cornshed Sisters. The album title Commontime refers to the common 4/4 time signature referred to by musicians as "common time", and was intended as a joke by Field Music in reference to their reputation for using various types of time signatures in their songs.

== Musical style and composition ==
=== Pop, funk, other genre influences ===
"The Noisy Days Are Over"
"The Noisy Days Are Over" features a fast-paced and energetic tempo, a circular and repetitive bassline, and a dance-floor groove, with David and Peter Brewis on vocal harmonies.

"Disappointed"
"Disappointed" is an example of Field Music's greater emphasis on choruses in Commontime, while also featuring a synth-led melody with a new wave sound.

"Same Name"
"Same Name" features falsetto vocals by David Brewis, along with a funky guitar riff and low-key drumming, as well as small flourishes of synthesisers.

Commontime has been described as Field Music's most accessible album to date, to which David Brewis responded: "I am okay with the word 'accessible'". The album's songs encompass a wide range of genres and influences; as Larry Bartleet of NME wrote: "There are references to just about every genre you can think of here, from funk and R&B to classical and glam rock, all bound together with the Brewis’ usual wiry textures." David described Commontime as "a distillation of all of the elements that make up Field Music". The album has been described as art rock, art pop, indie pop, chamber pop, and sophisti-pop. It features progressive rock elements, similar to those of Field Music's previous album Plumb, though Under the Radar writer Cody Ray Shafer argued Commontime was a "much more focused effort, more consistent and straightforward" than Plumb, with "a more precise emphasis on sticking to one idea at a time".

Commontime also had a stronger pop music sound than previous Field Music albums. Peter Brewis said: "We really do love pop music and that love of pop is still there" on Commontime, though he argued Field Music approached pop "maybe in a slightly different way" than other bands. Despite the greater emphasis on pop in Commontime, Edgardo Rodríguez of No Ripcord argued that the band had "been hinting at this direction" since as early as its 2007 album Tones of Town. Pitchfork writer T. Cole Rachel described Commontime as "splitting the difference" between the "artful leanings" of Field Music's Measure (2010) and the "more conventional post-punk pop immediacy" of the band's 2005 self-titled debut album.

Several tracks on Commontime were similar in style to those from the School of Language album Old Fears, which David Brewis described as "wiry pop funk". David said this similarity was deliberate: "It all feeds into this linear – if not a straight line – vision of what we are doing. ... There is no way I could blank all of that stuff out, because what I was doing on the School of Language record was exactly the music I wanted to make at the time." Several music writers noted the funk influence on Commontime, with Pat Levy of Consequence of Sound calling it "funky and poppy", The Independent writer Kevin Harley noting its "snappy funk grooves", and John Freeman of The Quietus describing it as "intricate prog-funk" with a "a pop sensibility". Several writers particularly compared it to the funk style of Talking Heads. Harley wrote that Field Music often kept the funk influence modest and economical, resulting in a "tight, frugal funk". Mac Randall of The New York Observer argued Commontime's "non-funky tracks" were less overtly complex than much of Field Music's earlier work, particularly Plumb, which Randall said "consisted in large part of fragments within fragments, changing mood and tempo with alarming frequency".

The most funk-inspired tracks on Commontime, like "Disappointed", "Same Name", "Don't You Want to Know What's Wrong?", were composed by David and feature him on vocals most prominently. These songs reflected a difference in composition style between the two brothers; David noted that Peter's songs tend to have a greater emphasis on "conceptual frameworks", while his own songs were more focused upon "one thing through the whole track", which he attributed in part to his appreciation for the artist Prince. As an example of this style, "Same Name" features David's falsetto vocals with a funky guitar riff and low-key drumming, as well as small flourishes of synthesisers. Levy called it "a simplistic formula that yields fun results", adding: "For a nearly six-minute song where not much happens, the arrangement still makes it one of the album highlights." "Don't You Want to Know What's Wrong?" features an energetic bassline, grooving guitar, slow staccato drums, and what Rodríguez described as a "Philly soul-inspired bounce".

=== Hall & Oates, American number-one singles ===
We listen to Hall & Oates and just drool over how smooth and perfect the backing vocals are. Me and Peter always have had upfront backing vocals on our records, which not many contemporary bands do, but to embrace it consciously probably does come from Hall & Oates. There's also a sense of letting rip a little bit with the lead vocals, which we're generally too English and embarrassed to do. But Daryl does it O.K., so if Daryl does it, then maybe we can give it a go.

— David Brewis

The greater accessibility and shift toward pop music in Commontime was partially inspired by Peter Brewis' young son's love of American number-one singles and, in particular, the music of Hall & Oates. Peter Brewis said: "We prepared for Commontime by listening to the music that our kids wanted to listen to." David and Peter had been fans of Hall & Oates since their childhoods, and when Peter's son's became interested in the band, they listened to the music often and had discussions with each other over it. David said they began "obsessing" over strength of Hall & Oates' backing vocals, and believed they could achieve a similar result on Commontime. Field Music had long featured upfront backing vocals on its albums, which David said was probably partially inspired by Hall & Oates. The band inspired Field Music on Commontime to have "a sense of letting rip a little bit with the lead vocals, which we’re generally too English and embarrassed to do".

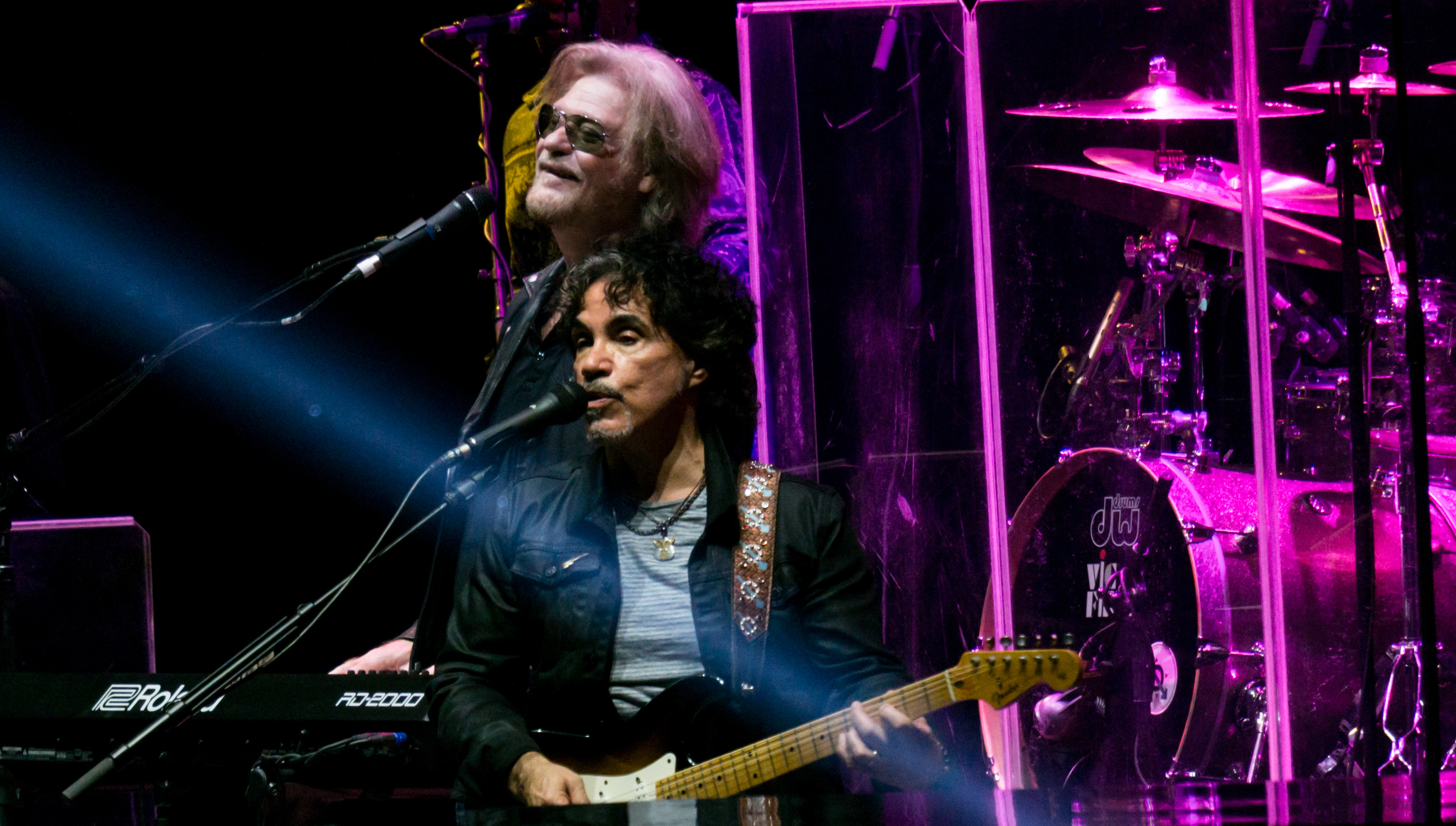
Hall & Oates were a major influence on Field Music's greater shift toward pop music on Commontime.

In addition to Hall & Oates, Peter said Commontime was influenced by his son's interest in The Beatles, David Bowie, Prince, and Paul Simon, particularly the album Graceland. David Brewis said in the past he had not written songs so directly influenced by specific types of music, but with Commontime he attempted to do so because he wanted to try something different, and because of the sheer number of pop songs he was listening to at the time. He said on Commontime, the band "turned down the inhibitions for this record and all the weird rules that we have were relaxed a bit. ... There was a definitely a sense of wanting to have some fun." In the past, David said the band tried to avoid repeating elements in songs, but with the new record, he described a "conscious desire to embrace proper songs ... the kind that's three and a half minutes with a chorus that repeats three times". Peter Brewis said listening to these pop songs over and over because of his son led him to pick out different elements of the songs that he had not noticed upon earlier listens. This inspired him to incorporate more repetitious elements into his Commontime compositions than on previous albums, about which he said: "I like the idea of being repetitious without being formulaic." David added that, as a result of listening to so many pop songs, "this time the chorus was at the center of our concerns, whereas in recent years we have been inclined to favour stair structures, even labyrinths". He cited "Disappointed" as an example of this increased focus on choruses, saying: "We were consciously embracing the simplicity and directness of the pop music we love, where most of the song is in the chorus and the singing is always right at the front."

=== Unusual time signatures, vocal harmonies ===
As with other Field Music works, Commontime features unique song structures, unconventional instrumentation, and unusual time signatures that occasionally shift mid-song. Sean Ward of The 405 cited the "unconventional rhythm" of the songs "Disappointed" and "But Not For You" as examples, and The Guardian writer Alexis Petridis described "I'm Glad" as having a "tricky, ungainly time signature". Keighley News writer David Knights noted the album's "rhythmic gear changes" and "songs which end abruptly or merge into others". Rory Foster of The Line of Best Fit wrote that the only song with "a straightforward input from the rhythm section" was album closer "Stay Awake", and even then only in part of the song" The album also features "interweaving vocals", and sophisticated harmonies, which were one of the band's regular trademarks. Commontime features more instances of the Brewis brothers singing together than past Field Music albums, as well as more backing vocals in general, with David describing them as "really quite prominent and quite complicated" and "kind of an audacious thing to do". Vocal harmonies are prominently featured in the choruses of both "The Noisy Days are Over", and "Disappointed"; Levy said David Brewis' vocal range on his "Disappointed" harmony elevated the song "from a straightforward pop track into something more complex and layered". Petridis said "Trouble at the Lights" included "heady swirls of harmony vocals", and DIY writer Anastasia Connor described "But Not For You" as featuring "vocal harmonies running up against brain-frazzling cornucopia of sounds" Bekki Bemrose of musicOMH argued "That's Close Enough for Now" "wouldn’t be half the track it is without" the layered vocal parts.

At six-and-a-half minutes, album opener "The Noisy Days are Over" was the Commontime's longest track, far longer than the average song length of two minutes on Field Music albums like Tones of Town and Plumb. With elements of funk, jazz, and progressive pop, "The Noisy Days are Over" features a fast-paced and energetic tempo, a circular and repetitive bassline, and a dance-floor groove that lasts for the song's duration. Jacob Nicholas of The Mancunion wrote that the song "showcases the whole of Commontime in a single track: the tight, trebly groove, the orchestral flourishes, the two brothers harmonising, and a slightly off-kilter drum outro". By starting the album with "The Noisy Days are Over", PopMatters writer Ian King said Field Music "(goes) for broke up front ... setting up the rest of Commontime with a flexibility that they enthusiastically explore but don’t push too far". David Brewis said the horn arrangements and the song's outro were "a touch of homage" to Prince, particularly works from his 1986 album Parade.

=== Guitars, strings, brass instruments ===
Several songs on Commontime make use of brass instruments, as well as strings, with some string arrangements in a baroque style. NARC Magazine writer Mark Corcoran compared the album's use of strings to those of the band Stereolab, while Ward noted that the songs "Trouble at the Lights" and "I'm Glad", though very different in terms of pace and tone, bore similarities through "the psychedelic Tame Impala strings". Drowned in Sound writer Ben Philpott considered that "The Morning is Waiting" had "grand, luscious production and romantic spread of andante piano, strings and horns". A ballad with dreamy avant-garde flourishes, the song features a prominent string accompaniment and a simple piano backing, complemented by what Connor called a "floating" brass part. Horns are most prominently featured in "The Noisy Days are Over", a Peter Brewis composition, which build to an exuberant saxophone solo, which David Brewis described as "bizarre" and "atonal".

Compared to past Field Music albums, Commontime features more examples of the band utilising danceable grooves for the duration of the song. One example is "I'm Glad", a dance-friendly arrangement that Bemrose said illustrated Field Music's "inventive approach to rhythm". The song also featured what The Independent writer Andy Gill called "angular" guitar breaks, a term Petridis also applied to the guitar solos from "Indeed It Is". Field Music utilized two guitars on many of the tracks on Commontime, and several songs feature the band's signature guitar sound, like "It's a Good Thing", which is largely driven by a consistent guitar riff. That song mixed elements of R&B and 1980s-style pop, and Sendra called it "proof that they don't need to lay it on thick to create something masterful ... with the vocals, chopping and mixing them into a brightly shimmering brew". The song "Disappointed" begins with a hazy guitar introduction with soft jazz tones, before shifting to an energetic tempo, and a synth-led melody with a new wave sound. Philpott called it "arguably the poppiest track in the band's repertoire", and Bemrose wrote: "Its languid, hazy start is misleading for what swiftly transforms into an out and out catchy pop tune that is a great deal of fun."

Bartleet described "Trouble at the Lights" as "possibly the best example of how expansive" Field Music has become, while Allmusic writer Tim Sendra said the song shows "how well they can stretch out and do some serious sonic exploration". An episodic song with shifting tempos, it starts at a slow pace, alternating between synths, harmonized vocals, and soft piano interludes, before concluding with a hard-rocking instrumental finale, punctuated by wild drum patterns and vocal wailing. Petridis compared the song's closing to "I Want You (She's So Heavy)" by The Beatles. In contrast, "The Morning is Waiting" is one of the slowest-paced songs on Commontime, an orchestra-backed ballad with a heavy emphasis on keyboards, as well as backing vocals from Liz Corney.

== Lyrics and themes ==
=== Parenthood and family ===
Commontime was the first album released by Field Music since David and Peter Brewis became fathers, and several of its songs are about parenthood and family, as well as the shift in responsibility and priorities imposed by children. Rebecca Lord of Barry and District News wrote: "Perhaps the overwhelming influence on the brother's recent songwriting, intentionally or not, is fatherhood, ... with conversations and choruses, family and friendship at the heart of Commontime." Several reviewers noted Commontime was more upbeat and wistful than previous Field Music albums due to Brewis brothers' new status as fathers; Barnaby Smith of The Quietus noted that Commontime was "less barbed and softer in tone" than Plumb, which was a darker and more political in its subject matter.

Peter Brewis in particular said fatherhood led to a significant change in perspective with regard to the music the band makes: "I've had a few shifts in perspective; I can't help but write about family things now." David said fatherhood was more of a songwriting topic for Peter than for him: "There's only one song on mine on the new album about having a baby. Whereas Peter, there are allusions to it through a few more of Peter's songs." Several songs on Commontime are about parenthood, including "The Morning is Waiting for You", "I'm Glad", and "Stay Awake". Additionally, NME writer Larry Bartleet argued "The Noisy Days Are Over" is written from the perspective of a father who needs to transition into a new, quieter role in life.

"The Morning is Waiting For You" is a lullaby Peter wrote for his young son. The title was inspired by a line from one of his son's books, which Peter read to him every night. He found the line to be "a really nice sentiment". Peter thought about the feelings associated with being a new father when he wrote the song, and found it easy to write as a result. The lyrics include words of comfort from Peter to his son, such as "those who need to hear you can hear you". When Peter first played the song for his son, who was two years old, he not like it; according to Peter, "He wanted "Another One Bites The Dust" on again." Rebecca Lord of Barry and District News called the song "surely one of Field Music's most tender moments".

"Stay Awake", a composition by David Brewis, is written as an apology to David's wife for his irritable behavior due to sleepless nights caused by their baby, particularly reflected by the lyric: "I'm sorry if I'm ever short with you." The song reflects on the way in which the new child has affected the relationship between husband and wife. David was worried about how his wife would react to the song, given the subject matter, but she was very moved by it.

=== Growing into middle age ===
Coming to terms with aging is a recurring theme throughout Commontime. "The Noisy Days Are Over" and "But Not for You" each include lyrics addressing a friend who refuses to grow up when everyone around him is settling down. The Guardian writer Alexis Petridis said both songs approach the subject with "a finely balanced cocktail of exasperation and tenderness". "The Noisy Days Are Over" in particular is framed as a conversation between two friends, with one trying to convince the other to abandon his hard-partying ways and to become more mature, particularly through the lyrics in the chorus: "The noisy days are over / And here we are instead, / Why don't you go to bed like everybody else? / Why don't you grow old like everybody else?" The song is about accepting middle age and living a quiet life, and letting go of the recklessness of youth, and serves as both a rebuke to friends who cannot grow up and a lament for past times. The song also includes tongue-in-cheek advice for coping with middle age, with lyrics like "And don't forget your name / Or where you live". T. Cole Rachel of Pitchfork argued the song could be self-directed, rather than directed at someone else, and Will Hodgkinson of The Times suggested the song could be inspired by the Brewis brothers' wives urging them to grow up. In any event, Rachel writes that the song "both acknowledges and rejects the pains of growing older", and The Guardian writer Harriet Gibsone said some of the lyrics involve "lamenting the end of life without the burden of adult responsibilities".

"How Should I Know If You’ve Changed? and "They Want You to Remember" address what The Guardian writer Alexis Petridis calls "bittersweet lure of nostalgia". "How Should I Know If You've Changed?" in particular is about the awkwardness of attending school reunions. "Indeed It Is," according to Petridis, "perfectly captures the moment when you’re jolted by the realisation that adulthood, with all its mundane worries, is irrevocably upon you". Kieron Tyler of Mojo said "The Morning is Waiting" includes "a poignant reflection on the moving on that's inevitable when you age".

=== Politics ===
The work of Field Music has usually included political connotations, often influenced by the Brewis' brothers hometown of Sunderland, which had long experienced job losses, budget cuts, and other negative consequences of government policies. However, Commontime moves away from the broadly political subject matter of the band's previous album, Plumb, in favour of a greater focus on personal, domestic issues. David Brewis attributed this in part to becoming a father, which made family a more important and immediate concern than politics. The album's official description by Memphis Industries reads: "The sense of bubbling political frustration in the lyrics is expressed this time through close-ups rather than Plumb's broad sweep." Additionally, David said the prospect of meaningful political change seemed remote at the time Commontime was made, so that becoming angry about it "almost pointless, or at least disappointly directionless."

With the stronger pop music sound in Commontime, the album sends a message that experiencing joy and fun despite difficult political times is itself an act of political defiance. Peter Brewis said of this: "It is also a political action to go and have fun, despite what is going on. It's almost like turning the other cheek." David felt when Field Music makes more pop-oriented music, it is "music by kind of normal people living kind of normal lives and having kind of normal feelings", but it also addressed the complexity of normality, which he considered "a political statement in itself." Peter stressed the band was not seeking to "ignore problems and just have a good time" with Commontime, nor to create an album focused on escapism, but rather said "it was cathartic not in an angry way, but rather to have "a good time while we were singing these lyrics about quite difficult things", which he called "cathartic (but) not in an angry way".

Songs like "Don't You Want to Know What's Wrong?", "How Should I Know If You've Changed?", and "But Not for You" addressed anxieties about how events have unfolded, both personally and politically, and the distances that arise in human relations. "Trouble at the Lights" was written by Peter about his distaste for Range Rover vehicles and the "political class of people who seem to drive them". He described cars as a status symbol and Range Rovers in particular as a "really ostentatious symbol", adding that he tends to associate them with the Conservative Party of the UK. Memphis Industries' description of Commontime notes that "Trouble at the Lights" "asks if these are 'hard times for everyone', even for those behind the tinted windows of their 4x4s". The lyrics also used traffic as a metaphor for character.

=== Other themes ===
David Brewis said there was a great deal of dialogue in the lyrics on Commontime, saying: "It does feel like a conversational record." According to T. Cole Rachel, some songs on the album are about "the often mundane nature of relationships ... and accepting one's own shortcomings." The song "Disappointed" is about a couple attempting to navigate a relationship, with the singer making a plea to his lover to set realistic expectations, particularly during the chorus: "If you want this to be more / Then you got to let me know / But if you want me to be right every time / You're gonna be disappointed." David Brewis described the song in this way: "I'm imagining a couple trying to get together and not quite managing it because they're a bit older and they've already built up complete lives as individuals. Their expectations of what love should be have become too byzantine to let themselves take a risk." Occasionally, the singer questions his partner about her expectations: "Should it be clear to me? / Should I understand it? / Have I been asking too much? / Or not enough?" At other times, the lyrics become tense and angry, like the statement: "Do me a favour and leave it all behind, please?” The song "I'm Glad" includes a line "Baby, we're going for broke / We're heading for the red, but isn't everyone?" Petridis suggested this could refer to Field Music's own financial struggles, as the band often struggles to achieve commercial success.

== Recording and production ==
We've moved on to a kind of domesticity and now it's more about the balance between that and somehow managing to sustain this bizarre career we have. ... We have less time in the studio, we have less time to just ponder things. I've always felt that was an integral part of my songwriting process to have an idea and just think about it for a few weeks. Now that's a luxury we really don't have. It's meant that when we go into the studio it's kind of feverish.

— David Brewis

David and Peter Brewis recorded Commontime in their home studio in the Wearside area of Sunderland. It was the fourth of five consecutive albums Field Music recorded over seven years at the studio. The album was written and recorded in spontaneous bursts over six months, and the process was different from Field Music's previous albums because both brothers were now caring for young children at home. Previously, they would work at a much slower pace and, according to Peter, "mess around for ages, drink cups of coffee and try things between popping to the shops". During the recording of Commontime, the brothers had far less time to spare, and would spend only about three hours a day in the studio for three days of each week. David said this required a change in approach to his songwriting style; while he previously spent weeks pondering a song before finishing it, he now had to move more quickly and finalize elements as he went along. Prior to the birth of his son, David said he "would never go into the studio with a half-finished song", and instead would have the entire song completely planned and finished before recording. Due to greater time restraints, he said the process was different with Commontime: "I would come in, well it's like, 'I've got these chords, I've got this riff, I've got most of the lyrics, let's just start.' That was quite liberating for me, and it has been again, this time." This resulted in a greater feeling of spontaneity for the brothers while working on Commontime, compared to Field Music's previous albums. David said of this: "In the past we may have rejected an idea for being too obvious, this time we just went with it, and played that chorus again and played that riff again." The band purchased what Peter described as a "really unfashionable, early 80s" electronic keyboard and used it during the recording of several songs because of its "really esoteric sound"; he described this as both fun and challenging.

== Release ==
The forthcoming release of Commontime was first announced on 13 October 2015, with the release date set for 5 February 2016. Memphis Industries announced it would make compact disc and iTunes digital versions of the album available, as well as a limited edition double green vinyl record. Physical pre-orders came with a print signed by Field Music, and all buyers received an instant digital download of the album's first single, "The Noisy Days Are Over". That single was also released on 13 October 2015, and a music video for the song was released on 8 December 2015. Directed by Andy Martin, the video stars Graeme "Grassi" Hopper, a musician, artist, and DJ, as well as a friend of the Field Music bandmates. In the video, Hopper visits various places throughout Sunderland, including the Park Lane Interchange, The Bridges, Jacky White's Market, the Hot Rats record shop, and the city's seafront. Everywhere he goes, he is confronted by people lip-syncing the song to him, including David and Peter Brewis. In describing the music video, Gabriela Claymore of Stereogum wrote "a man traipses through a series of landscapes as friends, strangers, and TV personalities berate him". It concludes with Hopper performing the song's saxophone solo, after which, according to The Guardian, he is "liberated from his longing for the hedonistic days of youth". Peter Brewis conceived the concept for the music video, and he felt Martin's finished product was "visually stunning" and "very funny", adding: "It's a perfect commentary to the song and it works as a snapshot of our little cultural sphere in Sunderland".

The second single from Commontime was ""Disappointed", which was released on 12 January 2016. It was premiered by New Zealand radio DJ Zane Lowe on his show Beats 1 Radio, where he named it his "World Record". Prior to the official release of Commontime, Field Music held performances in record shops and small venues across the UK, about which the band said: "To celebrate (Commontime's) release, we've teamed up with some of our favourite record shops in the UK. We'll be heading around the country, cramming into inappropriate spaces to perform songs from Commontime, and perhaps a couple of old favourites." The shops also sold exclusive double orange vinyl record versions of the album, with some of the venues offering free admission to anyone who purchased it. Among the venues at which Field Music performed were the Georgian Theatre in Stockton-on-Tees on 29 January, with the event put on through the Tees Music Alliance as part of Independent Venue Week" the Trades Club in Hebden Bridge on 22 January 2016, the Rough Trade in Nottingham on 9 February, the Pop Recs in Sunderland on 11 February,

In support of Commontime, Field Music undertook its first American tour since 2010. The U.S. portion of the tour was kept short at the request of the band, who found touring overseas difficult for because of their children. David said he had "never been a great tourer anyway (because) I find it quite difficult there being so many things I have no control over", and especially with regard to traveling to the U.S., he added: "I don't want to be away from my best little mate for 12 days". The tour ran from 25 February to 1 April, with 22 dates in total and eight in the U.S. It started with four weeks with shows in various UK locations only on Thursdays, Fridays, or Saturdays, which David called "a proper Dad's UK tour." The first tour stop was at The Cluny in Newcastle on 25 February, and the tour included subsequent stops in York, Cardiff, Nottingham, Leeds, Manchester, Glasgow, London, Southampton, and Brighton. The tour's first U.S. appearance was at the DC9 Nightclub in Washington, D.C., on 25 February, followed by stops in Philadelphia, New York City, Boston, Seattle, and Portland, before the tour concluded at The Independent in San Francisco on 1 April. The tour was further complicated for Field Music because the increased number of backing vocals on the album were challenging to perform and replicate live.

After the release of the album, Field Music launched a podcast called Commontime Radio, named after the album, which was available on the audio streaming platform Spotify.

== Sales ==
Commontime became the first Field Music album to reach the Top 40 in the UK Albums Chart, reaching position No. 36 and remaining on the chart for one week. The album sold 3,240 copies in the UK during the first quarter of 2016.

== Critical reception ==
=== Reviews ===
Professional ratings
Aggregate scores
Source	Rating
Metacritic	79/100
Review scores
Source	Rating
AllMusic	4/5 stars
Clash	6/10
Drowned in Sound	8/10
The Guardian	4/5 stars
The Independent	4/5 stars
The Irish Times	4/5 stars
Mojo	4/5 stars
NME	4/5 stars
Pitchfork	7.8/10
PopMatters	8/10

The album received positive reviews, with an aggregated Metacritic rating of 79 out of 100, which the website characterised as "generally favourable reviews". It made several year-end lists of the best albums of 2016, including No. 29 on BrooklynVegan, No. 35 on Mojo, and No. 84 on Under the Radar, and was included in The A.V. Club's "best music of 2016 so far" article on July 29, 2016.

Bill Pearis of BrooklynVegan named Commontime his favourite album of 2016 and called it Field Music's best album to date: "Their musicianship and skills as producers and arrangers have always been exceptional; here, however, there is an excitement, a playfulness, a connection we haven’t felt from Field Music before." The Quietus writer John Freeman also said Commontime might be his favourite Field Music album yet, called "The Morning Is Waiting For You" "possibly Field Music’s most beautiful song to date". Kieron Tyler of Mojo called Commontime "possibly their strongest album yet" and said, in comparison to Plumb, it "opens things out and is more personal". Les Inrockuptibles writer Christopher Conte called it one of the catchiest and most beautiful albums Field Music ever made. Ferran Cano of MondoSonoro called it Field Music's best album yet, and said it married the intelligence of most Field Music albums with a more joyful sound as a result of the Brewis brothers becoming fathers. The Independent writer Kevin Harley called Commontime a "career best-turn" from Field Music and demonstrated them as "an uncommonly canny band warming to new possibilities".

Andy Gill, also of The Independent said Commontime was full of engaging ideas and genial character, and "by some distance the most assured and complete" of Field Music's albums. While he felt the band's past albums have "suffered from a certain studiousness", he believed the songs on Commontime "appear simpler and less over-refined than before. There’s a greater openness to allowing tunes to prevail in their most hummable form, unsabotaged by proliferating variations and sudden shifts of direction." NARC Magazine writer Mark Corcoran called the album "another remarkable feat for Field Music" and highlighted its "sophisticated, intricate songwriting", particularly praising "The Morning Is Waiting" and "Trouble At The Lights" as "some of their most intricate but also most touching work to date". Paul McGuinness of Record Collector said the album improves the longer it plays, and praised Field Music for "doing the unexpected, not content to allow a song to simply flow the way it feels it should". T. Cole Rachel of Pitchfork said the album "balances the Brewis brothers' predilection for unusual song structures and unconventional instrumentation with a decidedly grown up narrative". She called "Disappointed" "among the catchiest and most jubilant pop songs the band has ever recorded", but declared the best songs "Don't You Know What's Wrong?", "The Morning Is Waiting", "How Should I Know If You've Changed?", which he called "both clever and refreshingly earnest".

NME writer Larry Bartleet said Commontime "feels at once fresh and self-assured, bearing its painstaking complexity with a striking nonchalance ... not only do the Brewis brothers work outside the mainstream, they’re making music no one on the inside is capable of" Ian King of PopMatters said the band's foray into funky rhythms felt like a "natural next step" for Field Music, and called the album "wiry but not wired, showing the brothers from Sunderland, England to be as smart and agile as ever, all the while making it sound easy." Sean Ward of The 405 said the album is consistently strong, with each track nearly as good as the next: "Field Music can do no wrong when it comes to critical releases as they add another exceptional song set to their growing discography." The Times writer Will Hodgkinson described Commontime as "a musically complex, lyrically straightforward album about the vagaries of family life, and it's superb". Noel Murray of The A.V. Club said the Brewis brothers "seem more relaxed and intuitive than unusual on this record, internalizing their influences rather than feeling compelled to dazzle listeners with their expertise." Le Monde writer Stéphane Daet called Commontime a complex album that may require additional listens to fully appreciate, and particularly complemented the songs "Disappointed", "They Want You to Remember", and "The Morning Is Waiting". Bekki Bemrose of musicOMH praised Commontime's songs, calling them especially fulfilling due to their attention to detail, and said "The Noisy Days Are over" in particular "by rights it should be topping charts and dominating radio air time".

Drowned in Sound writer Ben Philpott said Commontime had occasional pacing issues, but that the songs had "a great sense of technicality and skill" and called Field Music "without question, national treasures, and their music deserves to be heard". Edgardo Rodríguez of No Ripcord called the album challenging and artful, writing that the band "miraculously found a way to make the eternally uncool eighties sound relevant", but said "the Brewises' love for intricate harmonies will always go hand in hand with slick pop hooks". Ian King of PopMatters said Commontime dexterously bends rock, pop, funk, and R&B to fit Field Music's distinct regional post punk dialect. He said the album emphasizes Field Music's "smoother side", a strength the Brewis brothers have been developing both together and separately since Field Music's 2010 album Measure. Allmusic writer Tim Sendra said Commontime had some of the catchiest Field Music songs to date, calling it one of their most interesting and rewarding albums to date, and writing that "the brothers remain masters of arranging and choosing exactly the right instrument for each part of each song".

Rebecca Lord of Barry and District News wrote, "No one else really does what Field Music do: the interweaving vocals, the rhythmic gear changes, the slightly off-chords, the obvious lack of bombast, the songs which end abruptly or merge into others. ... Now more than ever, with conversations and choruses, family and friendship at the heart of Commontime, Field Music are something to be truly treasured." Siobhan Kane of The Irish Times said with Commontime, the Brewis brothers "have created a world of gorgeous melodies and ideas all their own". Marcus O'Dair of Uncut praised the album, calling it "musically intricate", and writing that "at moments Field Music call to mind a Canterbury scene band transplanted to Tyne and Wear and the present day". Stereogum writer Collin Robinson called Commontime a "stellar album". Rudy Foster of The Line of Best Fit enjoyed the album, particularly "The Noisy Days Are Over", but said he believed it would have been more commercially successful if had catchy hooks and more conventional time signatures instead of unusual lyrical structures and "weird staccato drum patterns". However, he added, "but then they wouldn’t really sound like Field Music and our own universe would be a much poorer place for that."

The Observer writer Paul Mardles said Commontime was consistent with Field Music's overall body of work, but positively influenced by the Brewis brothers becoming parents. He particular noted "the touching The Morning Is Waiting (which) possesses a depth hitherto absent from their work."" Alexis Petridis of The Guardian, said Commontime "feels like a curiously uncomplicated pleasure, no matter how painstakingly it was put together". He also said the album had "infectious warmth", though she said it was slightly too long and "could happily have lost a couple of less distinguished tracks". Jacob Nicholas of The Mancunion called the album a "hyperkinetic stream of ideas" and said the band "take(s) simple pop songs and create(s) something occasionally genuinely transcending, brilliant and life affirming in a way that's hard to describe". He particularly praised "The Noisy Days Are Over", which he called the album's "only truly essential track". However, he said Commontime was slightly too long, and said some tracks like "The Morning is Waiting for You" "veers dangerously close to musical theatre". Some critics who reviewed the album positively felt the running time was slightly too long.

Other reviews were more mixed. Clash writer Benji Taylor praised "The Morning is Waiting" for You" and "The Noisy Days are Over", which he called "impossibly catchy", but felt the band "play(ed) it too safe at times", and could have sounded edgier. He added: "Despite that minor criticism, their unique, funky take on pop is rarely less than fascinating." Cody Ray Shafer of Under the Radar felt Commontime was a more consistent album than Plumb, but also a less adventurous and less exciting one that "lacks the inventive spark that we've come to expect from Field Music". Consequence of Sound writer Pat Levy called the album "yet another exciting new move for the band" with many high points, but said it was arranged haphazardly, with some songs bleeding together and others "sticking out like a sore thumb". He wrote: at no point is it necessarily bad — but it is confusing". Katie Hawthorne of The Skinny reviewed Commontime negatively, writing that the lyrics start to wear thin and that the album lacked diversity. Anastasia Connor of DIY said "despite some truly magnificent moments", the album had a whimsical construct that failed to live up to its musical promise. He said the album "falls prey to the duo's tendency to create music that sounds more like a conceptual play filled with clever reference points".

Multiple reviewers compared Commontime to the work of Talking Heads, Steely Dan, XTC, David Bowie, Hot Chip, Peter Gabriel and Genesis, Prefab Sprout, Scritti Politti, Todd Rundgren, The Kinks, and Electric Light Orchestra.

=== Prince tweet ===
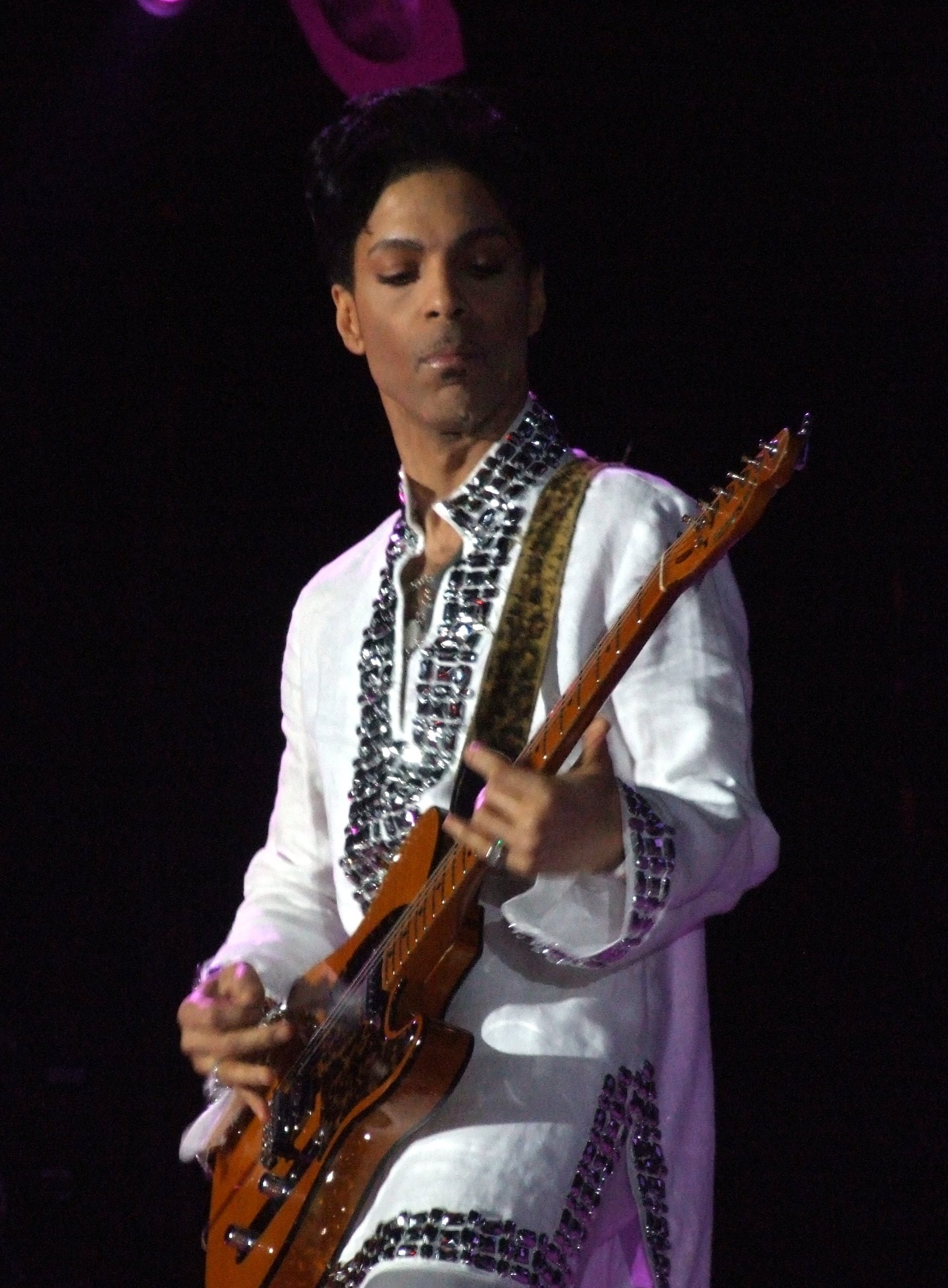
The musician Prince wrote about "The Noisy Days Are Over" on Twitter, which generated media attention for Commontime and Field Music.

In November 2015, the official Twitter account of the musician Prince tweeted a link to the song "The Noisy Days Are Over", with no accompanying text except the words "FIELD MUSIC" in capital letters. David Brewis looked over the rest of Prince's Twitter feed to try to determine whether the account's tweets were ghost-written by someone else, rather than Prince himself writing the tweets, but he said: "It didn't seem like a cleverly mediated promotional site. It really seemed like it was him. So, I think he has heard the song." The tweet was ambiguous enough that the band was uncertain whether it was intended to be praise for the song, or an accusation that Field Music was stealing ideas from Prince. David Brewis said the band's music has been influenced by Prince: "We thought of it as an homage rather than a lift, but maybe he thought we'd ripped him off once too often." Prince later deleted the tweet, which created further confusion among the band, according to David: "Did that mean he hated the song? Was he just trying to baffle everyone?"

The tweet generated media attention for Field Music, and came up regularly in subsequent reviews. and afterward The Guardian asked David to write an article about Field Music's appreciation for Prince and their favourite songs by the artist. Within 24 hours of its publication, Prince tweeted a link to the article as well. The second tweet convinced Field Music that Prince was not unhappy with the band, because they did not believe he would have shared the link otherwise. In response, David Brewis said: "We haven't offended Prince, and that is important to me." David described the Prince Twitter episode as "a very strange experience", that left him "happy and very confused", the latter of which because: "I just cannot imagine Prince sitting at home and listening to Field Music."

== Track listing ==
All songs written and composed by David and Peter Brewis.

1. "The Noisy Days Are Over" – 6:27
2. "Disappointed" – 3:04
3. "But Not for You" – 3:48
4. "I'm Glad" – 3:44
5. "Don't You Want to Know What's Wrong?" – 3:17
6. "How Should I Know If You've Changed?" – 2:56
7. "Trouble at the Lights" – 5:33
8. "They Want You to Remember" – 3:42
9. "It's a Good Thing" – 4:25
10. "The Morning Is Waiting" – 3:56
11. "Indeed It Is" – 3:15
12. "That's Close Enough for Now" – 3:56
13. "Same Name" – 5:45
14. "Stay Awake" – 4:07

== Personnel ==
Credits adapted from AllMusic.

=== Field Music ===
- David Brewis – vocals, composer
- Peter Brewis – vocals, composer

=== Additional musicians ===
- Jennie Brewis – vocals
- Liz Corney – vocals
- Ed Cross – violin
- Simon Dennis – trumpet
- Ele Leckie – cello
- Josephine Montgomery – violin
- Andrew Moore – bass (upright), organ, piano
- Chrissie Slater – viola

=== Technical personnel ===
- Susie Green – sleeve art
- Dan Nore – lighting, photography
- Matthew Tye – design, layout

== Charts ==
Chart (2016)	Peak position
Belgian Albums (Ultratop Flanders)	120
UK Albums (Official Charts)	36
