= David Brewis =

English singer

David Brewis is an English singer, songwriter and musician. With his brother Peter Brewis, he formed Field Music, a rock band based in Sunderland, Tyne and Wear in 2004.

Prior to Field Music, he was in the band New Tellers.

Field Music released their self-titled debut album in August 2005. A collection of B-sides and earlier songs (including tracks written for The New Tellers and Electronic Eye Machine), Write Your Own History, was released in May 2006. Their second album, Tones Of Town, was released on 22 January 2007.

During the hiatus of Field Music from 2007 to 2009, he worked on a personal musical side project School of Language releasing the album Sea from Shore in February 2008 through Memphis Industries (in the UK and Ireland) and Thrill Jockey Records (in the US and Europe). The same year he also cooperated with his brother Peter Brewis who had launched his own musical project The Week That Was. In the same-titled album The Week That Was released on 18 August 2008, also with Memphis Industries, David Brewis was featured on some of the tracks.

David Brewis has also played with former Fiery Furnaces singer Eleanor Friedberger on her UK tour in the summer of 2013. He released a second School of Language album Old Fears, in April 2014.

Both David Brewis and Peter Brewis joined their former bass player Ian Black in the band Slug, touring as support to Hyde & Beast in the autumn of 2014.

== Discography ==
- Field Music (8 August 2005)
- Tones of Town (22 January 2007)
- Field Music (Measure) (15 February 2010)
- Plumb (13 February 2012)
- Music For Drifters (18 April 2015 (vinyl), 24 July 2015 (digital))
- Commontime (5 February 2016)
- The Soft Struggles (24 February 2023)

The New Tellers

- The New Tellers (2003)

School of Language

- Sea from Shore (4 February 2008)
- Old Fears (7 April 2014)
- 45 (30 May 2019)

You Tell Me

- You Tell Me (2019)

Appearances in The Week That Was

- The Week That Was by Peter Brewis (18 August 2008)

Appearances in Slug

- Ripe (13 April 2015)
