= Plumb (Field Music album) =

Studio album by Field Music
- Released: 13 February 2012
- Recorded: 2011
- Genres: Indie rock; indie pop; alternative rock; chamber pop; art rock; progressive rock
- Length: 35:39
- Label: Memphis Industries

Field Music chronology
Field Music (Measure) (2010)	Plumb (2012)	Field Music Play... (2012)

Singles from Plumb
- 1. "(I Keep Thinking About) A New Thing" Released: 19 December 2011; 2. "A New Town" Released: 4 February 2012; 3. "Who'll Pay the Bills?" Released: September 2012

Plumb is the fourth studio album by the English rock band Field Music. It was released by Memphis Industries on 13 February 2012. With 15 tracks over 35 minutes, the album consisted of short tracks that weave and intertwine together like an extended suite. This marked a deliberate departure from Field Music's previous double album Measure (2010), marking a return to the more fragmentary nature of the band's first two albums, Field Music (2005) and Tones of Town (2007). Plumb was nominated for the 2012 Mercury Prize, much to the band's surprise.

Plumb has been described as a "melting pot of genres, influences, and styles", incorporating elements from the funk style of Peter Brewis' side project The Week That Was, and the new wave and synth rock of David Brewis' School of Language. The songs on Plumb featured a wide variety of instrument combinations, from horns and strings to synthesizers and keyboards, as well as a great deal of falsetto vocals and sophisticated harmonies. The album featured interchanging time signatures, rapidly changing tempos, and sudden changes in tone and mood.

The lyrics of Plumb touched on several topics, including financial difficulties from the Great Recession and frustration with the state of politics at the time. Other themes included loneliness and nostalgia, everyday life for the British working class, and dissatisfaction with consumerism as well as other aspects of the modern world. The title Plumb, broadly meaning "straight" or "level", also inspired the purple artwork on the album's cover because it is a homophone of "plum".

This marked the first Field Music album without the band's former keyboardist Andrew Moore. Plumb was the first of five consecutive albums Field Music recorded in a new studio in Sunderland following the closure of a space the band shared for 10 years with the Futureheads. The album received positive reviews, and appeared on several year-end lists of the best albums of 2012. Several reviewers compared Plumb to the work of such artists as XTC, Pink Floyd, Yes, the Beach Boys, Todd Rundgren, Electric Light Orchestra, and the Beatles.

== Background ==
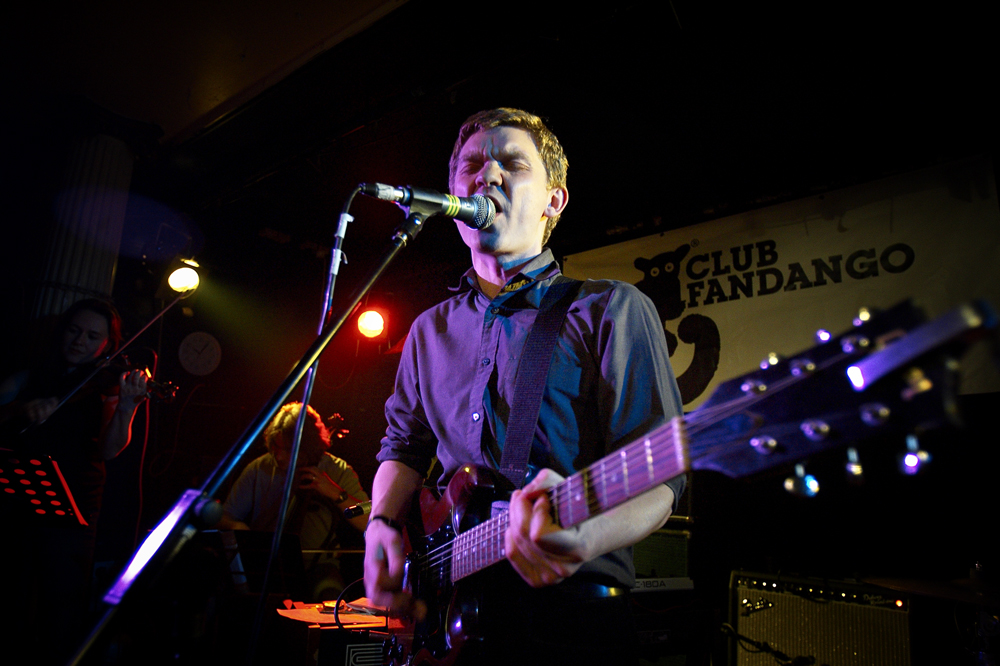
Peter Brewis, a member of the rock band Field Music, which also includes his brother David.

Plumb was the fourth studio album by Field Music, the English rock band led by brothers David and Peter Brewis. Released through the band's label Memphis Industries, it marked Field Music's second album since returning from a hiatus in 2010. Andrew Moore, former Field Music keyboardist, did not perform on Plumb. David Brewis said the album title Plumb was the most entertaining option from a list of possible titles they prepared. He said the title had "a bunch of connotations" based upon the word plumb's definition of straight or level. The album cover and artwork involved a great deal of the color purple because of the rhyme between the words plumb and plum.

The cover of the album is a drawing of a filling station, which David said the band was attracted to because of the political, economic, and environmental implications of such stations. Peter Brewis made the collage, while both brothers provided input about its use in the album layout. Peter sought for the cover to be part collage and part naturalistic, which the band felt reflected the way they record music. The image was also partially inspired by a print in Peter's bathroom of an Edward Ruscha painting called Standard, which showed a gas station rendered to highlight different perspectives, geometry, and colours. The band tried to commission artist Richard Galpin, who has also created works involving filling stations, to create the Plumb cover, but he was unavailable because he was working on artwork for another album.

== Musical style and composition ==
=== Album structure ===
Both me and Peter write quite a lot of pieces of music which don't lend themselves to becoming three-minute pop songs. They are pieces of music that seem complete in themselves, and it would be quite contrived to try and stretch them out. This time round, we feel that provided we structure the album right we can find a way to make these miniature pieces of music work.

— David Brewis

While Field Music's previous release Measure was a 75-minute double album, the band sought to make a significantly shorter and tighter album with Plumb, which has a running time of just over 35 minutes. Peter Brewis said: "We wanted to do something that was in opposition to the previous record, which was long, too long some people might say, and that really worked as an album that could be listened to all the way through and flowed as a whole." David Brewis noted that when preparing an album, "we usually do the opposite of what we did before", and that since Measure embraced more traditional rock conventions in the style of bands like Free and Led Zeppelin, Field Music wanted to move in a different direction with Plumb. Peter Brewis said: "We weren't reinventing the wheel with every song but we were trying to, I think in my mind, make it short and coherent and concise but every track to be different as well."

Prior to the recording of Plumb, David and Peter had written several pieces of music short pieces of music that did not conform to the traditional structure of three-minute pop song, including fragmentary tracks and unused ideas from Measure and other recording sessions. Most songs on the album are under three minutes, with several that two minutes or less. The longest is "A New Town" at about four minutes, while the shortest is "How Many More Times?" at 40 seconds. The band felt stretching them to a traditional song length would have felt contrived, so instead they sought to structure the album in such a way to support the shorter pieces. Peter Brewis said: "The idea was to be dictated by the music, not by the convention."

As a result, Plumb consists largely of short tracks that weave and intertwine together, like an extended suite. The songs flow into each other, and most lack the traditional verse-chorus-verse structure. This marked a departure from the more conventionally structured Measure, and was more similar to the fragmentary nature of their first two albums, Field Music (2005) and Tones of Town (2007). David Brewis said the individual tracks are modular and shift rapidly between sections in a more linear way than normally found on a pop album. David also said he believed listeners would at times believe they had heard multiple songs while they had in fact only listened to one, and vice versa.

For example, Aaron Lavery of Drowned in Sound said the opening track, "Start the Day Right", sounds as if it consists of three different songs, even though the track is only slightly more than two minutes long. Likewise, Gareth James of Clash wrote that "Choosing Sides" is "itself several songs in one". In particular, the first three songs on the album – "Start The Day Right", "It's Okay To Change", and "Sorry Again, Mate" – blend into each other with direct transitions and time signature changes; Helen Clarke of musicOMH said they "sound like one long, Queen-inspired epic". However, there are also full-length, individual songs that the album is built around, such as "A New Town", "(I Keep Thinking About) A New Thing", and "From Hide and Seek to Heartache".

Brent Ables of cokemachineglow described this structure as a "juxtaposition of discrete musical ideas that obey their own logic", with tracks that "flow together as fluently as the individual parts of each". Ian King of PopMatters called it a "linear collage-pop structure", while Pitchfork writer Aaron Leitko called it "a record of sweetly melodic miniatures" that take form only long enough to shift into an entirely new suite. David Brewis said the approach was "quite anachronistic" in a way because it adhered strongly to the concept of an album, rather than the more modern concept of individual digital tracks. Brewis said he prefers becoming immersed in a full album, adding: "I don't think we have particularly embraced the iPod world or the iPod Shuffle". He added that Field Music tends to structure its albums in two distinct halves, like two sides of a vinyl record, and he noted the largest gap between songs on Plumb is in the middle of the album because that would be the spot where a record would be switched to the other side.

=== Mix of genres ===
Plumb has been described as a work of multiple genres, including indie rock, chamber pop, indie pop, neo-prog, progressive rock, baroque pop, art rock, art pop, alternative rock, power pop, progressive pop, and britpop. A review in Sputnikmusic.com described the album as "a melting pot of genres, influences, and styles". Some reviewers said Plumb pays homage to classic rock.

Plumb incorporated elements from each of the Brewis brothers' side projects, including the funk style of Peter Brewis' The Week That Was and the new wave and synth rock of David Brewis' School of Language. Kyle Lemmon of Prefix Magazine said this was particularly prevalent in the track "(I Keep Thinking About) a New Thing". Helen Clarke of musicOMH wrote that the combination of the two styles resulted in "a collection of overblown, juddering XTC staccato rhythms". Some of the album's more funky moments include the guitar mantra in "A New Town", and the song "Is This the Picture?", which Clash writer Gareth James described as "highly strung plastic-funk". Several of the songs combine prog rock and pop sensibilities, while songs like "A New Town", "Choosing Sides", "Who'll Pay the Bills?", and "Is This The Picture?" blend elements of prog rock and new wave. One of the more prog-heavy songs is "A Prelude to Pilgrim Street", a piano and dulcimer miniature, which began with the sound of church bells, before segueing into continuing with piano chords and rapid drumming in a style reviewers have compared to Pink Floyd and The Who.

The album explored a progressive rock sound that had been featured more moderately in past Field Music works. It can be heard particularly in the reverberating bassline in "Who'll Pay the Bills?" and the heavy synthesizer undertone in "Choosing Sides". Tim Sendra of AllMusic said the progressive rock sound featured in Plumb was not the excessively challenging kind, but rather the accessible type that was prevalent on AOR stations in the 1970s. Likewise, Clarke described the one-minute interlude "It's Okay to Change" as "bonkers prog-rock with lashings of post-punk synths". Additionally, chamber pop elements can found in several songs with elaborate vocal choruses, and instrumental orchestral flourishes. For example, Lemmon called "So Long Then" a "lovely piano-led chamber piece", and Clarke described "Sorry Again, Mate" as having a "wonky, luscious chamber pop sound", while NME writer Hamish MacBain said it featured "a harmony-laden chorus that's almost Coldplay-like". "Ce Soir" also featured classical-leaning instrumentation, with strings and piano, which Lemmon sounded like the soundtrack a 1920s silent film.

The Brewis brothers have said musicals were an influence on the album, and reviewers have compared portions of Plumb to film scores; Memphis Industries said the album bears similarities to "20th century film music from Bernstein to Willy Wonka". The album's introduction in opening track "Start the Day Right", in particular, bears similarities to the soundtracks of Walt Disney films, with wind chimes, strings, and a four-note melody on bells, before segueing into boisterous drums and an electric guitar riff.

=== Instrumentation and vocals ===
In addition to Field Music's usual intricate guitar work and powerful drumming, the songs on Plumb included a wide variety of instrument combinations, including horns, clarinets, and string instruments like violins and cellos. The album also includes more synthesizers and keyboards than past Field Music albums, in part because the band was able to set up a greater number of keyboards in their new studio. "From Hide And Seek To Heartache" in particular makes prominent use of string instruments, as well as driving piano and rhythmic percussion parts.

Plumb includes a great deal of falsetto vocals, and lush, sophisticated harmonies, with David Brewis singing the higher parts. Songs like "A New Town" and "Is This The Picture?" in particular feature falsetto vocals, and Mark Jenkins of Blurt wrote that the falsetto passages feel as if Field Music "will settle for nothing less than the highest possible notes". Several reviewers compared the harmonies on Plumb to those of The Beach Boys, particularly on the track "How Many More Times?", the first a cappella track Field Music had ever recorded.

Plumb featured several interchanging time signatures, rapidly changing tempos, and sudden changes in tone and mood. This was particularly illustrated in the song "Choosing Sides", which began with slow, low-pitched keyboard sounds, which NOW music editor Carla Gillis described as "psychedelic", and M.T. Richards of East Bay Express called "space rock synths". However, the drums quickly built to a fast-paced tempo, and the song settled into a 7/8 time signature, with funk elements, bass-driven grooves, and non-lexical vocables. This quickly changed as well, with the song switching back to a 4/4 time signature, and concluding in an electro-funk style.

While many songs on Plumb had multiple sections or shifting musical styles, some were simpler variations over a repeating motif, like in "A New Town", which was built over a minimalist, groovy bassline, and a repetitious guitar riff. David Brewis described "(I Keep Thinking About) A New Thing" as the "most normal" track on the album, comparing it to Michael Jackson's "Black or White" in the style of Tom Petty and the Heartbreakers. Aaron Lavery of Drowned in Sound said the track contained all the ingredients of the Plumb album itself, including "an instant, insistent riff, ideas piled on top of one another, and questioning, self-doubting lyrics. On close examination, it is complex, meticulously arranged, undeniably prog, yet fun and exciting, slipping past you in a flash."

== Lyrics and themes ==
I've spent the last couple of years, since the financial crisis, reading up on economic theory in my spare time and dipping my toe into political activism of one kind or another. My head is totally spinning with ideas and anger and frustration, as I'm sure is the case for a lot of people at the moment. Unfortunately, any kind of mass communication, including pop music, involves trying to simplify things to make them understandable without having to pay too much attention.

— David Brewis

Plumb was the first Field Music album to substantially include politically themed songs, something that continued to be prevalent in most of the band's subsequent works. Kieron Tyler of Mojo described the album as a "35-minute state of the nation address". David Brewis had been studying economic theory and dabbling in political activism in the years prior to Plumb, particularly in response to the Great Recession. He described himself as angry and frustrated with the state of politics at the time, and called the song "(I Keep Thinking About) A New Thing" himself "venting my fury". The song is also about the limitations of pop music and mass communication when it comes to succinctly addressing and simplifying complicated issues. Some of the songs were influenced by past financial difficulties in the United Kingdom, particularly in the Brewis brothers' native North East, depicting what The Quietus writer Barnaby Smith called "scenes of the grimness and humiliation that many endured as austerity measures which took hold in Britain at that time". James Rainis of The Cornell Daily Sun wrote that Plumb discussed "politics, suburban disaffection, and life in an English industrial town", while Aaron Lavery of Drowned in Sound said the album reflected a passionate attitude about politics, culture, and community, as well as "uncertainty over what can be done to make a difference in those areas".

Several songs on Plumb included lyrics about loneliness and nostalgia; Lavery described the album as an "existential crisis in a post-industrial north-east town"; likewise, Forrest Cardamenis of No Ripcord said it included "existential, boredom-induced lyrics" with a heavy use of irony. Lemmon wrote that the album addresses themes of nostalgia, damaged relationships, and "an all-encompassing befuddlement" through a series of grandiose gestures and rapid movements. He wrote: "The blurring arrangements act as both an astringent for the protagonist's bleeding heart and a distraction from the pain." "So Long Then" included themes of loneliness and separation, as does "Ce Soir", which Andy Gill of The Independent described as a "tiny evocation of loneliness". The brief lyrics of "So Long Then" began as an everyday conversation between two people, before ending with "Wish I'd seen you before you'd gone", which Will Hodgkinson of The Times called "a subtle evocation of sadness, depicting how life unfolds for most of us". "Sorry Again, Mate" was about sadness and solitude, particularly reflected by the closing line: "Can I afford another day on my own / Sat in the kitchen with the radio on?" "From Hide and Seek to Heartache" reminisced about the simpler pleasures of childhood, while "Choosing Sides" was about what Hodgkinson described as "watching your life's possibilities grow increasingly limited".

The album expressed dissatisfaction with many aspects of the modern world, which MacBain said was illustrated by the fact that three of the song titles are questions: "Who'll Pay The Bills?", "Is This The Picture?" and "How Many More Times?" In particular, several songs on Plumb addressed the negative effects of consumerism, as well as Field Music's own determination to shun economic pressure and the idea that the band's success should be based upon how much money their music makes. David Brewis said the song "Choosing Sides" in particular "is about aspiration and how it has been hijacked across our generation to mean that to have more money is to have status [...] It's become something that's about money and status, and that infuriates me." Eric Harvey of The A.V. Club also suggested the song "(I Keep Thinking About) A New Thing" addressed "how consumerism structures our thought patterns".

Plumb also included lyrics about everyday life for the British working class, highlighting predictable daily rituals of that are easy to overlook and the effect they have on the ability for people to relate to each another. "Who'll Pay the Bills?" was about simple domestic issues that everyone faces, while "A New Town" focused on the anxiety of adapting basic routines to foreign or unfamiliar places; Harvey said it emphasized "the subtle wonder of seeing for the first time what's always been there". "Sorry Again, Mate" was also about the everyday commute and work week routine, with lyrics from the perspective of someone apologizing for being late after driving through traffic to catch a train. The lyrics included brief statements that reflect a banality associated with everyday routines, such as the opening lines "Trying to beat the traffic / Meet the train"; Beats per Minute writer Daniel Griffiths said of the song gives an impression that Plumb's concise nature "there isn't much point fretting over a missed train or listening to the radio when you can do something better." "A Prelude to Pilgrim Street" illustrated a resentment of city living, demonstrated by the lyric describing "greasy streets, starved of sun", words that Clarke said reflect "a grinding industrial, urban tone", and which Hodgkinson said "capture a very English mood: downbeat and gloomy but not without beauty".

Griffiths wrote that Plumb addressed simple, real-life matters in often very personal ways, making it an honest and engaging album: "It comes across as a record they've poured their heart and soul into, and have thus given their listeners an insight into their feelings." Lavery called it an "album made by youngish men trying to work out what they're doing in their particular worlds". Several reviewers said the lyrics are occasionally cathartic, with Jenkins citing a line from "Choosing Sides" that particularly expressed the "fed-up sentiments" of the band: "I want a different idea of what better can be which doesn't involve treating somebody else like shit".

== Recording and production ==
Prior to the recording of Plumb, Field Music had spent 10 years sharing studio space with The Futureheads. That studio, called 8 Music, became unavailable after the Recession forced the community building in which it was located to close. So Field Music built their own new studio, which was located on a light industrial estate in Sunderland overlooking the River Wear, close to the previous studio. David called it "a horrible little 1970s industrial unit saved from demolition by the economic downturn". The brothers got a good deal on the rent, moved in at the beginning of 2011, and recorded Plumb over the course of six months in that year. The brothers also mixed and mastered the album themselves there. Plumb marked the first of five consecutive albums Field Music recorded in the studio over seven years.

The period of time between the release of Measure and Plumb was longer than the usual gap between Field Music albums, though once the recording process began, it took about the same amount of time as any of the band's other works. Field Music usually begins work on the next album after finishing the last, but in this case they spent about a year touring after releasing Measure, so they did not get to write for Plumb until after the studio move. David said: "We were desperate to be in the studio after a lot of touring." David also injured a nerve in his right arm while painting the studio, which largely incapacitated him for the first three months of the year. Peter did "the majority" of drumming on the album as a result of David's injury.

Peter said the process of creating Plumb felt different than with Measure because they had to adapt to "the sound of the new room". The brought the curtains from the old studio into the new space because David said: "We were worried our music wouldn't sound the same without the old touches". As with their other albums, David and Peter Brewis worked closely together in the studio. Peter believed the band was "a little bit more relaxed and experimented with things a little bit more" because it was their own studio, adding: "We would go in at 10 a.m. every day and just see where the day would take us without feeling too much pressure." Peter and David would each prepare rough sketches of the songs on their own, then bring them to the studio to refine them and prepare the arrangements. Peter said of the process: "We do everything ourselves as well, so it probably takes us a little bit longer. We come in, set the microphones up, might play around for an hour or so, have a cup of tea, and then say OK we need to start something properly now. It takes a while to get everything sorted out."

Carla Gillis of NOW described Plumb as having "clean, natural-sounding production", while Harriet Gibsone of The Sunday Times said the album was "seeped in glowing George Martin-inspired production". Langhoff wrote: "The sound is pristine, an audiophile's dream, and the songs are so well-recorded you could diagram the entrance of every instrument". During the recording sessions for Plumb, Field Music recorded a song called "How We Gonna Get There Now?", which Collin Robinson of Stereogum described as "a groovy jam with rhythmic guitars ramping up and down in energy as the duo glides through sections with smooth harmonies". The band ultimately excluded it from Plumb because they felt it sounded too much like a Todd Rundgren song and was not a right fit for the album. They released the track online in September 2016.

== Release ==
The forthcoming release of Plumb was first announced in November 2011, with the release date set for 13 February 2012. The album's first single was "(I Keep Thinking About) A New Thing", an MP3 of which was released on Field Music's website as a teaser for the album. The song was playlisted on BBC Radio 6 Music, and was considered a favorite of that station. The album's second single, "A New Town", was also made available for download on the band's website in February 2012, and was included on a list of "Essential Tracks" by The Times on 4 February 2012.

Field Music embarked on a tour of the U.K. in support of Plumb. It included eight stops, starting on 6 February at the Caley Picture House in Edinburgh, with subsequent stops in Newcastle, Glasgow, Manchester, Leeds, Nottingham, Bristol, and a final stop at King's College London on 24 February. Ian Black, the bass guitar player who previously performed in tours supporting Field Music's Measure (2010), was unavailable for the Plumb tour, and was replaced by bassist Andrew Lowther. Kevin Dosdale also supported the live performances on synthesizer and guitar. Former Field Music keyboardist Andrew Moore joined the band for their performance at The Cluny in Newcastle on 10 February, playing some of the band's earlier songs. Field Music also performed at the Split Festival in Sunderland on 23 September, and toured again in support of the album from 3 October to 20 October, starting with a performance at The Lemon Tree in Aberdeen.

The band Stealing Sheep served as an opening act during portions of Field Music's tour. David Brewis had heard one of the band's tracks on Marc Riley's show on BBC Radio 6 Music and was impressed by the music and vocals, so he sought out more of their music. He felt they complimented Field Music well, and they were invited to participate in the tour. During tour appearances, Peter said Field Music did not seek to replicate the exact production or intricate compositions of their songs exactly as they sounded on the album because they considered live performances and records to be very different: "A live show should be an interpretation, not a replication. I like there to be a different feel live, a different energy, a different drive." Peter said the a capella "How Many More Times" and the harmonies on it were a particular challenge to perform live: "It's just got to be in tune, and in time. It should be fine. But that's easier said than done."

== Reception ==
=== Critical reception ===
Professional ratings
Aggregate scores
Source	Rating
Metacritic	77/100
Review scores
Source	Rating
AllMusic	4.5/5 stars
The A.V. Club	A−
Clash	8/10
The Guardian	4/5 stars
Mojo	4/5 stars
NME	4/5 stars
Paste	5/10
Pitchfork	7.3/10
Q	4/5 stars
Uncut	4/5 stars

Plumb received positive reviews, with an aggregated Metacritic rating of 77/100, which the website characterised as "generally favorable reviews". It made several year-end lists of the best albums of 2012, including No. 6 on The Oklahoman, and No. 15 on Herald & Review, and year-end round-ups of the best albums of 2012 by The Kansas City Star, O Globo, and Creative Loafing.

Tim Sendra of AllMusic called it Field Music's most precise, progressive, and immediately satisfying album so far, and describing it as the band "perfecting their sound (and) breaking it down to key elements". Beats per Minute writer Daniel Griffiths said, "Quite simply, Plumb is how pop music should sound", calling it a personal and introspective album featuring the band's distinctive and intelligent brand of pop music "that ranges from angular to grandiose, sweeping to ditty, with a great amount of delicate added to the measure". Herald & Review entertainment editor Tim Cain called Plumb Field Music's best album, as did Harriet Gibsone of The Sunday Times, who said it demonstrated the band has "mastered the conventions of the unconventional". Gareth James of Clash magazine called it an "exhilarating and ambitious collection", writing: "Plumb cements Field Music's reputation for truly magnificently crafted classic pop-rock, with an unashamed love of the grandiose soundscapes of the Seventies and a taste for adorning songs with neatly selected sounds from real life."

Kevin Harley of The Independent wrote: "Hustled busily forward by a wealth of detail and observation ... Plumb is in a league of its own." Helen Clarke of musicOMH wrote that despite the short running length, Plumb "packs in more sounds and ambitions than (Field Music's) entire back catalogue put together". Eric Harvey of The A.V. Club said Plumb is "polite and smart, arranging its unceasing collection of hooks like books on a shelf". Sunday Star-Times writer James Belfield called it "a surprisingly listenable mish-mash of poppy hooks, staccato time-signature shifts and elegantly scruffy everyday lyrics", and said while the unusual structure can be off-putting at times, the "overall effect is majestic". Likewise, Matt Wescott of The Northern Echo called Plumb a richly layered album best heard in one sitting.

Michelle Read of mX called the album "beautiful, challenging and thought provoking", writing: "just when the songs get too self-indulgent and threaten to run away, the brothers turn around and beckon with something intriguing". A review in Mojo magazine called Plumb a "delicious tasting menu of rock history", praising the suite-like structure and calling it "easier to digest, more delicately seasoned, and with better portion control than 2010's blow-out Measure". Aaron Lavery of Drowned in Sound called it Field Music's most accessible album thus far and "some of the most thoughtful, intelligent pop in the country". Michael Dix of The Quietus called it "perhaps the finest distillation to date of the various elements that comprise the group's distinctive sound". A review in Sputnikmusic.com called Plumb a work of "ongoing innovation with unparalleled musicianship" and "a melting pot of genres, influences, and styles that have found a way to live amongst each other in harmony". Kyle Lemmon of Prefix Magazine called Plumb one of the best albums of 2012 so far and praised the band's "openness to continually tinker with pop music's DNA." The New Zealand Herald writer Lydia Jenkin praised the album's interchanging time signatures and interchanging hooks, called Plumb "an album for album lovers" and "a magical soundtrack, a set of miniatures that are full of life and energy, even in their brevity doling out emotional pinpricks".

Michael Dix of The Quietus said it was "likely to be yet another overlooked masterpiece from the brothers Brewis", calling it "aesthetically pleasing and structurally sound creations (that) hide in plain sight, taken for granted". The Phoenix reviewer Jonathan Donaldson said Field Music combines experimental music with the ability to deliver a strong pop hit, and "it's hard to see much room for improvement" for Field Music after Plumb. Iain Moffat of The Fly wrote: "Plumb exposes every inch of the Brewises' brilliance". Hamish MacBain of NME said Plumb could be the band's "moment for wider acceptance", praising the album as music that "demands repeated visits and devoted attention to fully unlock" and "doesn't sit still for a second". BBC writer Chris Beanland said the album has a "suburban, provincial sweetness (that) is eminently loveable", praising the off-kilter song structures, asymmetric pop sound, and "endearingly weird Wearside aesthetic". Will Hodgkinson of The Times said the album "complex, ambitious music (that) takes random experiences and refines them into little musical gems".

When done right, like on Plumb, this combination of pop and prog works like a perfectly constructed musical machine and here it results in what is probably the duo's most immediately satisfying album yet. The shifting dynamics within each song, and from song to song, keep you riveted throughout and the quality of songcraft has never been higher.

— Tim Sendra, AllMusic

Tom Cardy of The Dominion Post said the album was unlikely to attract people who dislike art rock, but said it was just as satisfying and challenging as Measure and "while not mind-blowing, succeeds on its own terms". Toronto Sun writer Darryl Sterdan called Plumb an outstanding album of "quirk, strangeness and charm" that rewards repeated listening. Uncut claimed that the band were "able to mine considerable emotional capital from their seemingly parochial concerns" and that the group were "fast becoming the cherished eccentrics of British guitar music". Michael Edwards of Exclaim! said Plumb is Field Music's first album that works well as a whole, calling it a "rich, complex album". Noel Mengel of The Courier-Mail said the time changes and flourishes of Plumb never feel like a novelty, and that the album's subtle lyrics and sharp melodic sense keep it in check. DIY writer Luke Morgan Britton called Plumb the band's most cohesive album so far, in part thanks to the album's short running time. George Lang of The Oklahoman said despite the short track lengths on Plumb, the album was "economical and thoughtfully organized, not loud and fast, (and) engineered to exact specifications, perfect in its construction". Mark Jenkins of Blurt called it a "short yet bountiful album". In a review for the Kidderminster Shuttle, Kevin Bryan wrote that Plumb "serves up a generous helping of the fragmented and deliciously incoherent weirdness which has become the brothers' trademark".

Lauren Murphy of The Irish Times said Plumb called it an album of "vibrant, progressive songs that will seduce you with their sophisticated orchestral beauty as easily as they'll spur you on to shake a leg". Steve Moffatt of the North Side Courier called the album "kaleidoscopic" and "bursting with ideas and there's not a note or word out of place". NOW music editor Carla Gillis called Plumb "as ambitious, clear-headed and progressive as ever, with 15 seamless songs that consistently keep interest". Gordon Barr of the Evening Chronicle called it "a sterling effort – no two songs sound the same, and it's hugely listenable". A review in The Daily Telegraph wrote of Field Music, "this unsung quartet continue to make stately progress where others have sunk". NME writer Larry Bartleet said the album displayed an "industry-dismissing eccentricity". Jeff Glorfeld of The Age called Plumb a more challenging album than the band's previous album Measure, but wrote: "it still sounds wonderful, but when the brothers turn up the basic guitars-bass-drums format, it sounds like they're having more fun". Tom Lamont of The Observer called it "a disorienting but compelling listen". Brent Ables of cokemachineglow wrote that the structure of the songs can make it a challenging listen at first, but that Plumb was Field Music at their best.

The Northern Echo writer Matt Westcott said "their style won't appeal to everyone, but I found them a refreshing alternative to more mainstream bands". Bernard Zuel of The Sydney Morning Herald called the album "entertaining, even as it disorients", and said "Once the initial head-spinning has passed, the oddities and quirks become part of the patchwork of clever pop songs." Dave Simpson of The Guardian said Plumb can sound "baffling" on first listen because of the shifts in time signature and tone, but that "perseverance brings rich rewards, as the complexities start to make a weird sense and you end up swept along in their ever-changing moods". East Bay Express writer M.T. Richards said Plumb "often feels like several albums forcibly wedged into one" which leads to an uneven listening experience. Nevertheless, he said "even its more superfluous failures are endearing". Pitchfork writer Aaron Leitko reviewed Plumb positively, but expressed some disappointment at the album's deconstructionist approach compared to the more conventional structure of Measure, saying: "Plumb is a little too fussy", with strong hooks being abandoned too quickly and before being rushing into the next musical idea. Leitko said the songs don't stand as well on their own when removed from the context of an album. UCSD Guardian writer Taylor Hogshead said Plumb "may be the duo's most inspired work to date", though he said there were "a handful of throwaways that seem half-heartedly attached merely for their technical elegance", like "Ce Soir" and "So Long Then". Mike Evans of Electric City gave the album a mixed review, calling Field Music a "polarizing band" whose intricacies you either love or find too intrusive.

Not all reviews of Plumb were positive. Daniel Orr of The Westmorland Gazette wrote: "It wasn't for me, but it might be for you." PopMatters writer Ian King described the album as ornate and "noble, if occasionally unbalanced" that is "both rapturous and jumpy". Josh Langhoff, also of PopMatters, said the album feels "cold and severe, emotionally forbidding", and cycled too quickly through its musical ideas. The Daily Telegraph reviewer Thomas H. Green called it "very British, twitchy, literate, intellectual guitar pop that would run screaming at the first whiff of any macho posturing". In her review, Kitty Empire of The Observer said Field Music "remain more impressive than lovable". Rick Pearson of Evening Standard said the brief album has so many ideas that at its worst moments, it "sounded like the musical equivalent of channel hopping". Arne Sjostedt of The Canberra Times called the album "a bit wacky, structured and almost surreal" and said "in the end, it failed to make a huge impression". Andy Gill of The Independent wrote: "There's an awful lot of music crammed into Plumb's 35 minutes, but it's rarely organised into the most attractive shapes – and on the few occasions it is, they alter course within seconds and head off in some less appealing direction." Luke Winkie of Paste said Field Music has a "near-neurotic frenzy of cramming dozens of complex sound-geek ideas into microscopic time slots", but that the album "feels mostly like an over-concentrated mess of misplaced ambitions". Forrest Cardamenis of No Ripcord called the album's fragmented approach "too gimmicky and unfulfilling ... a new approach just for the sake of a new approach". A review in the Huddersfield Daily Examiner called the album "bizarre (and) as impossible to understand as it is unfathomable in its conception and execution".

Multiple reviewers compared Plumb to the work of XTC, Pink Floyd, Genesis, Yes, The Beach Boys, Todd Rundgren, Electric Light Orchestra, Prince, Supertramp, Split Enz, and The Beatles, as well as Paul McCartney as a solo artist. Several reviewers compared the album's shifting and fragmentary structure to that of the Beatles song "A Day in the Life", and Plumb also drew comparisons to Abbey Road due to its orchestrations, collage style, and segues and shifts between songs. Bun E. Carlos, drummer for the band Cheap Trick, praised the album, as did comedian Vic Reeves, who wrote on Twitter: "Field music [sic] may be Britains [sic] greatest current group".

=== Commercial performance ===
As of 18 October 2012, Plumb had sold about 9,000 copies. It received a boost in sales after the album was nominated for the Mercury Prize in September 2012, experiencing a 17% increase on the Official Charts Company through 1 November 2012.

Chart (2012)	Peak position
UK Albums (Official Charts)	49

=== Mercury Prize nomination ===
On 12 September 2012, it was announced that Plumb had been nominated for the 2012 Mercury Prize. The judges for the prize described the album as "playful harmonies, quirky rhythms, the stop start sounds of everyday life, love and daydreams in today's British city – gripping and affecting". After the nomination was announced, Field Music posted this message on their website:

"Well, blow us down and knock our socks off – Plumb has only been nominated for the Mercury Prize. We're a few albums in now and we were fairly convinced our chances of ever making the Mercury shortlist were minimal to nil, so this is a really nice surprise. Thanks for sticking with us, coming to the shows, buying the records and trying to convince the uninitiated to check us out."

David and Peter Brewis said they were surprised by the nomination, and that they almost didn't submit the album for consideration in the first place because, David said, "Generally speaking, thinking of music as a competition is a bad thing." Peter said: "It feels quite odd to be on the list. I think we are a minor concern compared to a lot of the other acts." Field Music was less well-known than many of the other nominees, and sold fewer albums than most of them; for example, by October 2012 Plumb, had sold about 9,000 copies, compared to 80,000 copies sold of the competing album Given to the Wild (2012) by The Maccabees. The brothers also said they felt Plumb unusual nominee compared to the others, and Peter said it might be "unfair" if they won: "The music industry would be right royally pissed off if somebody who has sold half as many copies as some of the others ended up winning." The bookmaker William Hill gave Plumb 16/1 odds of winning. An Awesome Wave (2012) by the indie rock band Alt-J ultimately won the Mercury Prize.

== Track listing ==
All songs written and composed by David and Peter Brewis.

1. "Start the Day Right" – 2:18
2. "It's Okay to Change" – 0:58
3. "Sorry Again, Mate" – 2:08
4. "A New Town" – 3:58
5. "Choosing Sides" – 3:12
6. "A Prelude to Pilgrim Street" – 1:48
7. "Guillotine" – 3:12
8. "Who'll Pay the Bills?" – 2:20
9. "So Long Then" – 2:06
10. "Is This the Picture?" – 2:41
11. "From Hide and Seek to Heartache" – 2:49
12. "How Many More Times?" – 0:40
13. "Ce Soir" – 1:13
14. "Just Like Everyone Else" – 3:00
15. "(I Keep Thinking About) A New Thing – 3:16

Piccadilly Records "Live Studio Sessions" bonus disc For a limited period, customers who ordered copies of Plumb on vinyl or CD from Manchester independent record store Piccadilly Records also received a free bonus CD, containing live studio session versions of the following songs:

1. "Start the Day Right"
2. "It's Okay to Change"
3. "Sorry Again, Mate"
4. "A New Town"
5. "Who'll Pay the Bills?"
6. "Effortlessly"
7. "Rockist" (School Of Language cover)

Rise Records "Best of" bonus disc Customers who ordered copies of Plumb from Bristol independent record store Rise Records also received a free bonus "Best of" CD, with the following tracks:

1. "Shorter Shorter" (from Field Music)
2. "If Only the Moon Were Up" (from Field Music)
3. "Got to Get the Nerve" (from Field Music)
4. "Tones of Town" (from Tones of Town)
5. "A House Is Not a Home" (from Tones of Town)
6. "In Context" (from Tones of Town)
7. "Rockist Part 1" (from School of Language album Sea From Shore)
8. "Rockist Part 2" (from School of Language album Sea From Shore)
9. "Scratch the Surface" (from The Week That Was album The Week That Was)
10. "Its All Gone Quiet" (from The Week That Was album The Week That Was)
11. "Let's Write a Book" (from Field Music (Measure))
12. "Choosing Numbers" (from Field Music (Measure))
13. "Them That Do Nothing" (from Field Music (Measure))

== Personnel ==
- Peter Brewis – vocals, composer, guitar, drums
- David Brewis – vocals, composer, drums
- Andrew Lowther – bass guitar
- Kevin Dosdale – synthesizer
- Emma Fisk – violin
- Pauline Brandon – violin
- Peter Richardson – cello
- Hugo Everard – trumpet, clarinet
