= You Tell Me (album) =

Studio album by You Tell Me
- Released: January 19, 2019
- Length: 35:22
- Label: Memphis Industries

David Brewis chronology
Commontime (2016)	You Tell Me (2019)

Sarah Hayes chronology
Woven (2015)	You Tell Me (2019)

Singles from You Tell Me
- 1. "Clarion Call" Released: August 15, 2018

Professional ratings
Aggregate scores
Source	Rating
Metacritic	79/100
Review scores
Source	Rating
AllMusic	3.5/5 stars
DIY	3/5 stars
Exclaim!	8/10
MusicOMH	4.5/5 stars
Paste	7.8/10

You Tell Me is a debut collaborative studio album by Field Music's Peter Brewis and Admiral Fallow's Sarah Hayes, appearing under the name You Tell Me. It was released on January 11, 2019, through Memphis Industries.

== Track listing ==
No.	Title	Length
1.	"Enough to Notice"	3:36
2.	"Get Out of the Room"	3:29
3.	"Foreign Parts"	3:08
4.	"Water Cooler"	2:16
5.	"Springburn"	3:02
6.	"No Hurry"	3:06
7.	"Clarion Call"	4:02
8.	"Jouska"	3:41
9.	"Invisible Ink"	3:20
10.	"Starting Point"	4:04
11.	"Kabuki"	1:38
