= Lowtalker =

EP by Menace Beach
- Released: 2014
- Genre: Indie rock
- Label: Memphis Industries

Menace Beach chronology
Lowtalker (2014)	Ratworld (2015)

Professional ratings
Aggregate scores
Source	Rating
Metacritic	70/100
Review scores
Source	Rating
Drowned in Sound	(7/10)
The Fly	3.5/5 stars
Line of Best Fit	6.5/10 stars
NME	(7/10)
This Is Fake DIY	3/5 stars

The Lowtalker EP is an extended play by Menace Beach.
