= Silver Fox (band) =

English punk rock band

- Origin: Newcastle, England
- Genres: punk rock; post-punk
- Years active: 2009–2015
- Label: Upset The Rhythm
- Past members: Laura Lancaster; Rachel Lancaster; Susie Green; Rebecca Knight
- Website: https://upsettherhythm.co.uk/silverfox.shtml

Silver Fox was an all-female English punk band formed in Newcastle, England in 2009. The band consisted of members Laura Lancaster, Rachel Lancaster, Susie Green, and Rebecca Knight.

== History ==
Silver Fox was founded in 2009 in Newcastle, England. The group began by performing covers together at an event organized by Knight at the Star and Shadow Cinema in Newcastle.

The band released their self-titled debut album on 18 November 2013. The album was produced by Andrew Hodson of the Newcastle duo Warm Digits. In a 2015 conversation with Interview, Laura compared the band's artistic intent to that of fellow British punk rock bands The Raincoats and The Slits.

On 27 July 2015, the band stated on Facebook that they were "taking an indefinite break."

== Other projects ==
Both Laura and Rachel were previously members of Meandthetwins, along with Maxïmo Park singer Paul Smith. Laura also played guitar in the band Big Fail, which she compared to American hardcore punk band Pissed Jeans and described as "self-deprecating rock".

Green began her musical journey singing in choirs during her youth, and played piano and clarinet in various bands. Before joining Silver Fox, she was a member of The New Tellers, a group formed by Peter and David Brewis of Field Music.

== Members ==
- Laura Lancaster – vocals, guitar
- Rachel Lancaster – bass guitar, vocals
- Susie Green – vocals, keyboard
- Rebecca Knight – drums

== Discography ==
=== Studio albums ===
- Silver Fox (Upset The Rhythm, 2013)

=== Singles ===
- Waves on in / Marble World (M'Lady's Records, 2012)
- Capital Kiss / Arosa (Milk Records, 2012)
