= Ratworld =

Studio album by Menace Beach
- Released: 15 January 2015
- Genre: Indie rock, surf punk
- Length: 32:52
- Label: Memphis

Menace Beach chronology
Lowtalker EP (2014)	Ratworld (2015)	Lemon Memory (2017)

Singles from Ratworld
- 1. "Come On Give Up" Released: September 22, 2014

Professional ratings
Aggregate scores
Source	Rating
Metacritic	68/100
Review scores
Source	Rating
Allmusic	4/5 stars
Clash	6/10
Contactmusic.com	3.5/5
DIY	5/5 stars
Drowned in Sound	7/10
The Guardian	3/5 stars
Loud and Quiet	6/10
musicOMH	3.5/5 stars
NME	8/10
Pitchfork Media	7.1/10

Ratworld is the debut studio album by Leeds-based band Menace Beach. The album was released through Memphis Industries on 19 January 2015.

== Critical reception ==
Ratworld received generally favorable reviews from critics. On Metacritic, it has been given a score of 68 out of 100 based on 13 reviews. Stephen Ackroyd of DIY raved the album, saying "Ratworld is that rarest of beasts—a debut album that’s got a backstory running deeper than all six seasons of Lost, but still sounds like it’s delivered without any requirement for effort whatsoever." Ackroyd gave the album five out of five stars. Al Horner at NME gave the album 8/10 praising their sound and musicianship, saying that Ratland "may relish a world on the brink of chaos, but this is a band with their shit together." Pitchfork Media's Evan Rytlewski gave the album 7.1/10 complimenting the band's embracing of their influences, as well as their energy. Rytlewski wrote Menace Beach "bottles and concentrates the exuberance of [1990s] era's alterna-pop".

Andy Peterson of Contactmusic.com gave the album a more mixed-review. Peterson felt that the album "their resolutely DIY aesthetic in the wrong hands could be a minefield of derivation"; however, he backpedaled and said the despite this that Ratworld " manages to bottle enough psy-kookiness in the thirteen tracks here to hold even the most wayward of attentions".

== Track listing ==
No.	Title	Length
1.	"Come On Give Up"	2:45
2.	"Elastic"	2:34
3.	"Dropouts"	2:44
4.	"Lowtalkin'"	1:44
5.	"Blue Eye"	3:53
6.	"Dig It Up"	2:31
7.	"Tennis Court"	2:45
8.	"Ratworld"	2:41
9.	"Tastes Like Medicine"	3:03
10.	"Pick Out The Pieces"	2:18
11.	"Infinite Donut"	2:15
12.	"Fortune Teller"	3:38
Total length:		32:52
