= School of Languages =

School of Language or School of Languages may refer to:

- Language school, a school where one studies a foreign language
- Milwaukee School of Languages, a 6–12 grade public school in the Milwaukee Public Schools district of Wisconsin, United States
- School of Language, a solo project by musician David Brewis that resulted in the albums Sea from Shore (2008) and Old Fears (2014)
