= Black Rainbow Sound =

Studio album by Menace Beach
- Released: 7 September 2018
- Length: 37:47
- Label: Memphis Industries

Menace Beach chronology
| Lemon Memory (2017) | Black Rainbow Sound (2018) |

Professional ratings
Aggregate scores
| Source | Rating |
|---|---|
| AnyDecentMusic? | 7.1/10 |
| Metacritic | 75/100 |
Review scores
| Source | Rating |
| AllMusic | 4/5 stars |
| Clash | 7/10 |
| DIY | 4/5 stars |

Black Rainbow Sound is the third studio album by English band Menace Beach. It was released on September 7, 2018 under Memphis Industries.

== Critical reception ==
Black Rainbow Sound was met with "generally favorable" reviews from critics. At Metacritic, which assigns a weighted average rating out of 100 to reviews from mainstream publications, this release received an average score of 75, based on 8 reviews. Aggregator Album of the Year gave the release a 73 out of 100 based on a critical consensus of 11 reviews. Nick Roseblade from Clash Magazine said of the album: "[the album] shows a band in flux. The songs sounds bigger and more articulated. Menace Beach are using a larger musical palate and it mostly works, swapping the messy surf guitars and charming slacker vibes while allowing the songs to speak for themselves.

== Track listing ==
Black Rainbow Sound track listing
| No. | Title | Length |
|---|---|---|
| 1. | "Black Rainbow Sound" | 3:48 |
| 2. | "Satellite" | 3:31 |
| 3. | "Crawl in Love" | 4:04 |
| 4. | "Tongue" | 3:41 |
| 5. | "Mutator" | 3:26 |
| 6. | "Holy Crow" | 3:35 |
| 7. | "8000 Molecules" | 3:26 |
| 8. | "Hypnotiser Keeps the Ball Rolling" | 4:44 |
| 9. | "Watermelon" | 3:49 |
| 10. | "(Like) Rainbow Juice" | 3:43 |
