= Lemon Memory =

Studio album by Menace Beach
- Released: 20 January 2017
- Genre: Indie rock, surf punk
- Length: 37:30
- Label: Memphis

Menace Beach chronology
Ratworld (2015)	Lemon Memory (2017)	Black Rainbow Sound (2018)

Singles from Lemon Memory
- 1. "Maybe We'll Drown" Released: 2016; 2. "Give Blood" Released: 18 November 2016

Lemon Memory is the second studio album by English surf punk band Menace Beach. It was released on January 20, 2017, by Memphis Industries.

== Track listing ==
On 5 October 2016, the track listing was confirmed.

No.	Title	Length
1.	"Give Blood"	3:14
2.	"Maybe We'll Drown"	3:36
3.	"Sentimental"	2:32
4.	"Lemon Memory"	3:34
5.	"Can't Get a Haircut"	4:20
6.	"Darlatoid"	3:15
7.	"Suck It Out"	3:26
8.	"Owl"	4:58
9.	"Watch Me Boil"	2:51
10.	"Hexbreaker II"	5:44
