= Music for Drifters =

Soundtrack album by Field Music
- Released: 18 April 2015 (Record Store Day vinyl release); 24 July 2015 (wide digital release)
- Recorded: 2014
- Genre: Indie pop, progressive rock, soundtrack
- Length: 40:40
- Label: Memphis Industries

Field Music chronology
Field Music Play... (2012)	Music for Drifters (2015)	Commontime (2016)

Music for Drifters is the official release of the soundtrack to the 1929 documentary Drifters, credited for kickstarting the "documentary" film genre. The soundtrack, commissioned in 2013 by the Berwick Film and Media Arts Festival, was composed by the Sunderland band Field Music. The composition is the first of their works to feature pianist Andrew Moore since 2007's Tones of Town. After touring the film accompanied by the band playing the soundtrack live around the UK, the composition was recorded and released firstly on vinyl for Record Store Day 2015 (limited to 750 copies), and then digitally in July 2015.

== Reception ==
Professional ratings
Aggregate scores
Source	Rating
Metacritic	75/100
Review scores
Source	Rating
AllMusic	3.5/5 stars
Drowned In Sound	7/10 stars
The Guardian	4/5 stars
NME	8/10 stars

Though a niche release commercially, the soundtrack was well received by some critics, with several praising the band's ability to evoke "...an oddly aquatic ambience...the percussive delicacy evocative of the lapping tide, the idiosyncratic shifting of pace signalling the unease of the environment". The Scotsman praised the touring performance of the soundtrack, giving it four stars (out of five) and again noting the "complementary score of plangent guitar, electro jazz keyboards and a slow martial beat to match the hypnotic footage of bobbing buoys and silvery shoals caught in the nets."

== Track listing ==
All songs written and composed by David and Peter Brewis and Andrew Moore.

1. "Introduction" – 0:46
2. "Village" – 2:37
3. "Engine" – 0:46
4. "Out of the Harbour" – 0:44
5. "Headland" – 1:34
6. "The Log-Line Tells the Miles" – 0:50
7. "Casting Out (Part 1)" – 0:40
8. "While Down Below" – 1:26
9. "Casting Out (Parts 2 & 3)" – 3:55
10. "Night-Time" – 0:43
11. "Destroyers of the Deep" – 2:58
12. "Dawn Breaks" – 1:26
13. "Wake Up" – 0:56
14. "Hauling" – 2:40
15. "The Storm Gathers" – 3:57
16. "Full Speed" – 0:32
17. "Batten Down" – 3:33
18. "The Ship Rides Through / Quayside (Part 1) – 2:26
19. "Quayside (Part 2)" – 4:54
20. "Ends of the Earth" – 1:43

== Personnel ==
- Peter Brewis – Field Music
- David Brewis – Field Music
- Andrew Moore – Field Music
