= Write Your Own History =

Compilation album by Field Music
- Released: 9 May 2006
- Genre: Indie rock
- Length: 25:20
- Label: Memphis Industries
- Producer: Peter Brewis / David Brewis

Field Music chronology
| Field Music (2005) | Write Your Own History (2006) | Tones of Town (2007) |

Write Your Own History is a compilation of B-sides and previously unreleased material by the Sunderland band Field Music.

The album was well received, receiving a 7/10 from The Guardian and praise from publications such as The Times.

== Track listing ==
1. "You're Not Supposed To" – 2:37 (2005)
2. "In the Kitchen" – 3:41 (2003)
3. "Trying to Sit Out" – 1:48 (2003)
4. "Breakfast Song" – 1:49 (2003)
5. "Feeding the Birds" – 2:11 (2003)
6. "Test Your Reaction" – 4:08 (2002)
7. "I'm Tired" – 2:47 (2002)
8. "Alternating Current" – 3:08 (2002)
9. "Can You See Anything" – 3:20 (2000)

== Personnel ==
- Peter Brewis
- David Brewis
- Andrew Moore
- Emma Fisk
- Laura Staniland
- Peter Richardson
- Michael Kershaw
- Kenny Kirsop
- Barry Hyde of The Futureheads – guitars
- David Hyde of The Futureheads – drums

== You're Not Supposed To ==
The album opener, "You're Not Supposed To", was later released as a single with a video depicting the band performing in a Northern England pub as the patrons form a large conga line and some join in playing instruments with the band. The single features a typographical cover similar to that of the album, but with larger text displaying the lyrics to the song rather than information on the band's history.

1. "You're Not Supposed To" – 2:37
2. "You're Not Supposed To" (The Matinee Orchestra Remix) – 3:26
3. "You're Not Supposed To" (video) – 2:33
