= Field Music (Measure) =

Studio album by Field Music
- Released: 15 February 2010
- Genre: Indie rock
- Length: Disc one: 34.2 minutes Disc two: 38.2 minutes
- Label: Memphis Industries

Field Music chronology
| Tones of Town (2007) | Field Music (Measure) (2010) | Plumb (2012) |

Professional ratings
Aggregate scores
| Source | Rating |
|---|---|
| Metacritic | 79/100 |
Review scores
| Source | Rating |
| AllMusic | 3.5/5 stars |
| Drowned in Sound | 8/10 stars |
| Pitchfork | 7.5/10 |

Field Music (Measure) is the third full-length studio album by indie rock band Field Music. It was released on 15 February 2010. Officially, the album's name is the same as their debut album; the name "Measure", other than being the name of one of the songs, does not appear anywhere on the album's artwork. However, both fans and the band have taken to calling it Measure to distinguish the two. Measure is a double album and is split into two discs. The first disc primarily contains more traditionally-structured songs, including both of the album's singles ("Them That Do Nothing" and "Let's Write a Book"), whilst the second disc is dominated by more experimental tracks including found-sound pieces ("See You Later" and "Louis").

== Track listing ==
=== Disc one ===
1. "In the Mirror" – 4:09
2. "Them That Do Nothing" – 3:09
3. "Each Time Is a New Time" – 3:34
4. "Measure" – 2:59
5. "Effortlessly" – 3:55
6. "Clear Water" – 3:16
7. "Lights Up" – 3:58
8. "All You'd Ever Need to Say" – 2:37
9. "Let's Write a Book" – 3:40
10. "You and I" – 3:15

=== Disc two ===
1. "The Rest Is Noise" – 3:52
2. "Curves of the Needle" – 3:53
3. "Choosing Numbers" – 2:06
4. "The Wheels Are in Place" – 3:03
5. "First Come the Wish" – 2:29
6. "Precious Plans" – 2:50
7. "See You Later" – 2:38
8. "Something Familiar" – 3:50
9. "Share the Words" – 3:50
10. "It's About Time" – 5:08 (approx.)
11. "Louis" (unlisted hidden track) – 2:47 (approx.)
- The last two tracks are separated by a period of silence, bringing the length of the final track to 9:50.

== Personnel ==
- Peter Brewis – Field Music
- David Brewis – Field Music
- Emma Fisk – violins
- Jill Blakey – violas
- Peter Richardson – cello
- John Beattie – cornet
- Jennie Redmond – backing vocals on "Something Familiar"
- Cath Stephens – backing vocals on "Something Familiar"
- Kev Dosdale
- Ian Black
- Mark Simms
- Peter Gofton
- Neil Bassett
- Ryan Rapsys
- Doug McCombs
- Andrew Moore
