= Field Music Play... =

Cover album by Field Music

Compilation album by Field Music
- Released: 1 October 2012
- Recorded: 2008–2012
- Genre: Indie pop
- Length: 30:36
- Label: Memphis Industries

Field Music chronology
Plumb (2012)	Field Music Play... (2012)	Music for Drifters (2015)

Field Music Play..., also known as just Play..., is a compilation album by the Sunderland prog-pop band Field Music.

The album features covers of songs written by a variety of artists, and recorded by Field Music between 2008 and 2012. For example, the cover of Roxy Music's "If There Is Something" was originally recorded by David Brewis as a B-side for a School of Language single; however, the version on Play... has re-recorded vocals and guitar parts. Some tracks, such as the Beatles cover "Don't Pass Me By", were originally released as tracks on magazine cover-mounts. The two Pet Shop Boys covers were previously released together as a limited double A-side single for Record Store Day 2012 under the name "Actually, Nearly".

The band have stated that they do not consider this release a true Field Music album, as many of songs were recorded for other projects. The compilation features artwork (created by band member Peter Brewis) in the same style as the band's fourth album's artwork (also by Peter Brewis) Plumb, released earlier the same year. The compilation was released digitally on Memphis Industries website and on CD on a limited run of 1000 copies and no re-pressings. The number of dots in the ellipsis in the album title varies between three and five from source to source, though on the CD cover it is five.

== Track listing ==
1. "Terrapin" (written by Syd Barrett) – 2:41
2. "Born Again Cretin" (written by Robert Wyatt) – 3:21
3. "Heart" (written by Pet Shop Boys) – 3:42
4. "If There Is Something" (written by Roxy Music) – 4:39
5. "Suzanne" (written by Leonard Cohen) – 4:04
6. "Don't Pass Me By" (written by The Beatles) – 4:08
7. "Fear Is a Man's Best Friend" (written by John Cale) – 3:48
8. "Rent" (written by Pet Shop Boys) – 4:20

== Personnel ==
In addition to the core band, Kev Dosdale plays guitar and Andrew Lowther plays bass on "Fear Is a Man's Best Friend".
