= NZCA/LINES =

Professional ratings
Aggregate scores
Source	Rating
Metacritic	67/100
Review scores
Source	Rating
Clash	8/10
The Fly	4/5 stars
The Guardian	3/5 stars
The Independent	3/5 stars
The Irish Times	3/5 stars
musicOMH	4/5 stars
The Observer	4/5 stars
Q	3/5 stars
Time Out London	5/5 stars

NZCA/LINES is the 2012 debut album by NZCA/LINES.

== Accolades ==
Publication	Rank	Ref
DIY	27	
Time Out London	11	
