= NZCA Lines =

British synthpop band

NZCA Lines (stylised as NZCA/LINES) are a British synthpop band founded by Michael Lovett, also of Metronomy. Previous members of the band include Charlotte Hatherley and Sarah Jones. They have played at Glastonbury festival 2016.

== Discography ==
- NZCA/LINES (Lo Recordings, 2012)
- Infinite Summer (Memphis Industries, 2016)
- Pure Luxury (Memphis Industries, 2020)
