= Menace Beach (band) =

Musical group

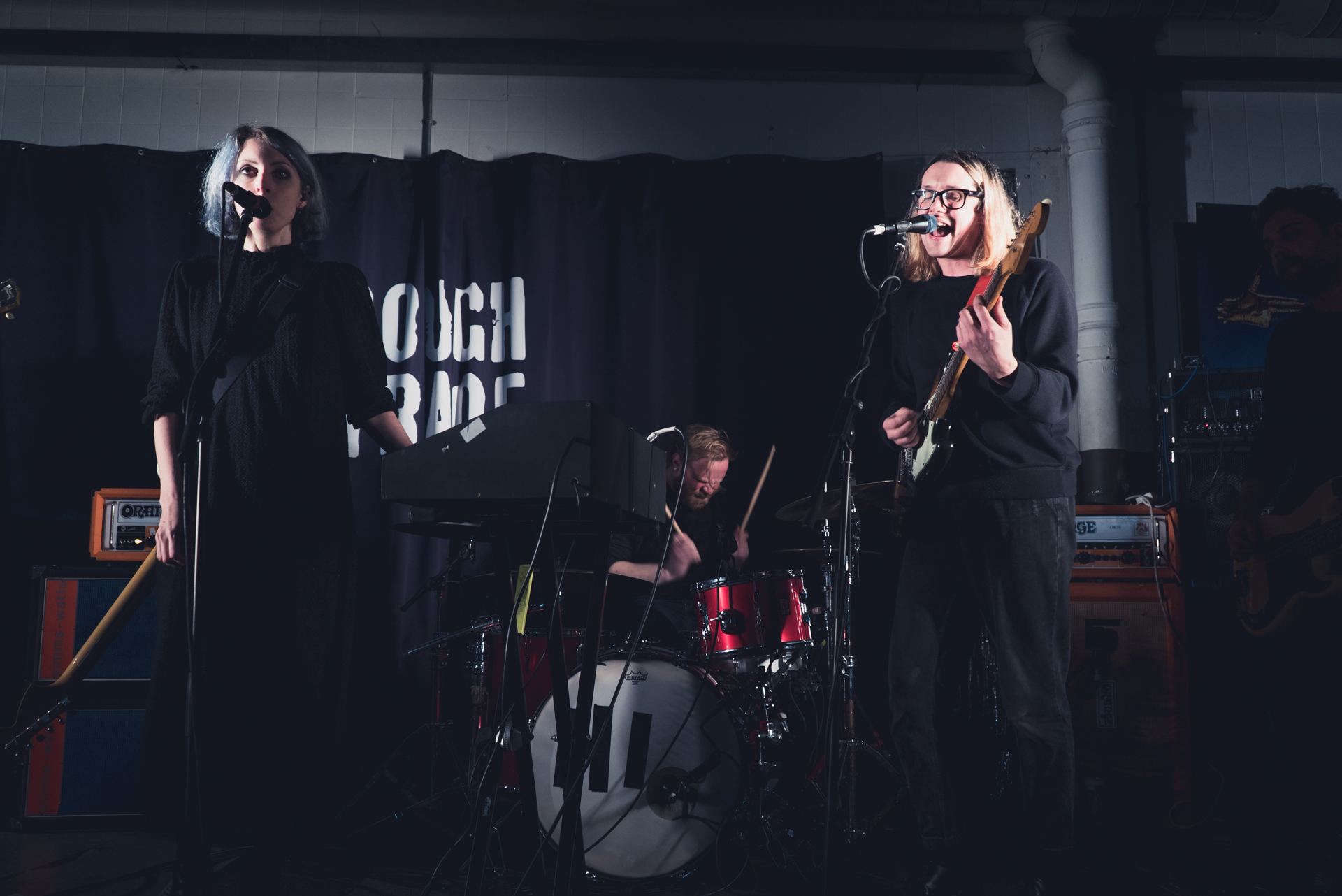
- Menace Beach performing in Jan 2017

Background information
- Origin: Leeds, England
- Genres: Indie rock, college rock, noise pop
- Years active: 2012–present
- Label: Memphis Industries (Link); Too Pure; A Remarkable Idea
- Members: Ryan Needham; Liza Violet; Matt Spalding; Nestor Matthews; Nick Chantler

Menace Beach are a five-piece indie rock band from Leeds, England.

Ryan Needham from the band, is also a member of Yard Act.

== Biography ==
Menace Beach were formed by core members Ryan Needham (currently the bass player in Leeds band Yard Act) and Liza Violet (formerly of Department M) in 2012. Although the band have a revolving cast of musicians, it has invariably included Nestor Matthews (previously of Sky Larkin), Matt Spalding and Nick Chantler (of Seize The Chair). They have also played with MJ of Hookworms, Robert Lee of Pulled Apart By Horses and Paul Draper of Mansun, who provided backing vocals and guitar on their BBC Radio 6 Music Marc Riley session. Brix Smith of The Fall and Brix & the Extricated performed on two tracks on their third album, Black Rainbow Sound. As a consequence of their notable members, the band have been called a supergroup. Menace Beach have released on Too Pure and French label Desire, but are currently signed to Memphis Industries; they released their third album with them in 2018. They have previously been produced by MJ of Hookworms at his Suburban Home Studio, and their video for Drop Outs was animated by Tom Hudson of Pulled Apart By Horses. The band have had coverage from NME, Drowned in Sound, This Is Fake DIY, Rough Trade and The Guardian.

== Discography ==
=== Studio albums ===
- Ratworld – Memphis Industries (2015)
- Lemon Memory – Memphis Industries, CD/LP/MP3 (2017)
- Black Rainbow Sound – Memphis Industries, CD/LP/MP3 (2018)

=== EPs ===
- Dream Out – Desire Records, Cassette (2012)
- Drop Outs/Tastes Like Medicine – Too Pure Singles Club release, 7" (2013)
- Tastes Like Medicine – Alcopop! Records Compilation Appearance (2013)
- Lowtalker – Memphis Industries, 12"/MP3 (2014)
- Super Transporterreum – Memphis Industries, 12"/MP3 (2015)
- Holidays Are Heavy - Memphis Industries, 7" (2015)
