= Field Music =

English rock band

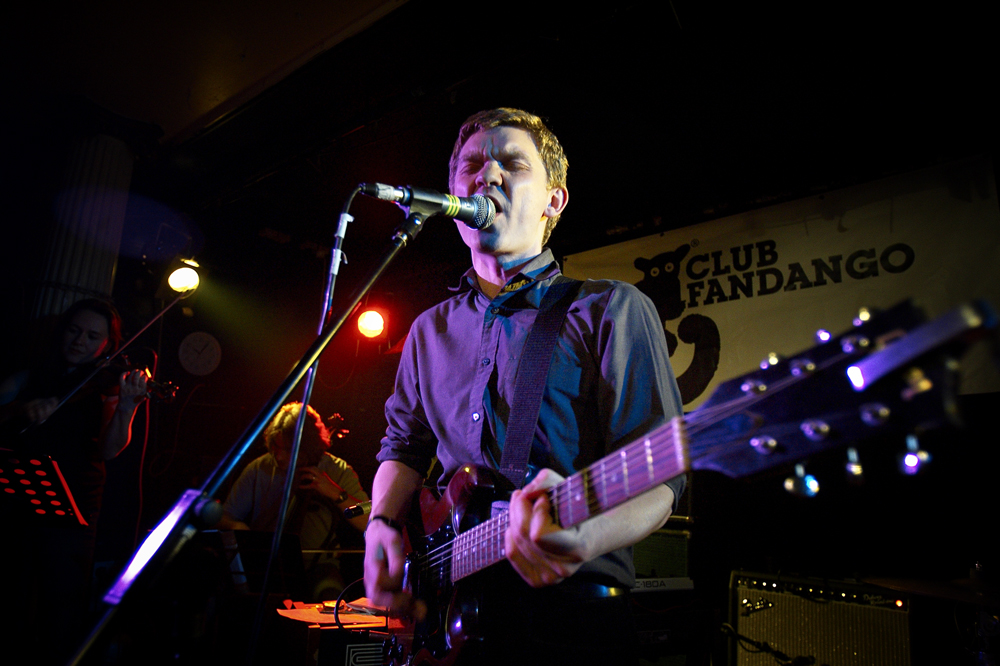
- Field Music at The Water Rats, Kings Cross, London, UK. November, 2007.

Background information
- Origin: Sunderland, England, United Kingdom
- Genres: Indie rock, art rock, progressive pop
- Years active: 2004–present
- Label: Memphis Industries
- Spinoffs: Fire Doors
- Spinoff of: The Futureheads, New Tellers, Electronic Eye Machine
- Members: David Brewis; Peter Brewis; Andrew Lowther; Kev Dosdale; Liz Corney
- Past members: Andrew Moore; Tom English; Ian Black

Field Music are an English rock band from Sunderland, Tyne and Wear, England, that formed in 2004. The band's core consists of brothers David Brewis and Peter Brewis. Andrew Moore was the original keyboard player. Their line-up has at times featured members of both Maxïmo Park and The Futureheads.

Field Music have been called one of the few bands to outlast the indie guitar band explosion of the mid-2000s. Describing the band as "a truly artful proposition in the pseudo-filled landscape of contemporary Brit art-rock", music blog The Fantastic Hope puts this down in part to their "un-self-conscious anti-fashion stance", arguing that Field Music's "wayward pop from the fringes of academia is one of the most worthwhile ways in which rock//indie/guitar music/white pop/whatever might evolve". Critics have compared their music to acts as diverse as Steely Dan, XTC, Prefab Sprout, Peter Gabriel, Scritti Politti, Talking Heads and Todd Rundgren. They have also been nominated for the Mercury Prize.

== Origins ==
Prior to Field Music, David Brewis was in the projects the New Tellers and Electronic Eye Machine. Several songs from these bands ended up as early Field Music recordings. His brother Peter Brewis at one time played drums for fellow Sunderland band the Futureheads.

== History ==
=== First phase (2004–2007): Field Music, Write Your Own History, Tones of Town ===
Field Music released their self-titled debut album in August 2005. A collection of B-sides and earlier songs (including tracks written for the New Tellers and Electronic Eye Machine), Write Your Own History, was released in May 2006. Their second album, Tones of Town, was released on 22 January 2007.

In an interview with BBC 6 Music in April 2007 the band claimed they were intending to split once the promotional engagements for Tones of Town were completed in June 2007.

"We basically want to do things that aren't classed as 'Field Music indie band'. We're not going to be a band for a bit. But Field Music aren't going to be over because we've already got a bank account under the name, so we'll just continue as a company. It's time to go and do some real work."

=== Hiatus of Field Music brand (2007–2009): The Week That Was, introduction of School of Language ===
Field Music later confirmed that the band had not split, addressing the hiatus on their official website. Under the name School of Language, David Brewis released the solo album Sea from Shore in February 2008 through Memphis Industries (in the UK and Ireland) and Thrill Jockey Records (in the US and Europe), while Peter Brewis recorded an album under the name the Week That Was. Their self-titled album was released on 18 August 2008, also with Memphis Industries, and featured both David Brewis and Andrew Moore on some tracks.

=== Second phase (2009–2013): Field Music (Measure), Plumb ===
In an interview with Stereogum in July 2009, the band confirmed that they had reunited (minus Andrew Moore) and were busy recording a third Field Music record. The 20-song double album, titled Field Music (Measure) was released through Memphis Industries in February, 2010 (15 February in the UK, 16 February in the US).

The band was chosen by Belle & Sebastian to perform at their second Bowlie Weekender festival presented by All Tomorrow's Parties in the UK in December 2010.

Their fourth album, Plumb, was released on 13 February 2012. It was preceded by the song "(I Keep Thinking About) A New Thing", available as a free download from their website. The album was nominated for the Mercury Prize that year. In an interview with Songfacts.com, guitarist and producer Al Kooper said that Field Music is his favourite new band.

=== Third phase (2013–present): Music for Drifters, Old Fears, Commontime, Open Here, Making a New World ===
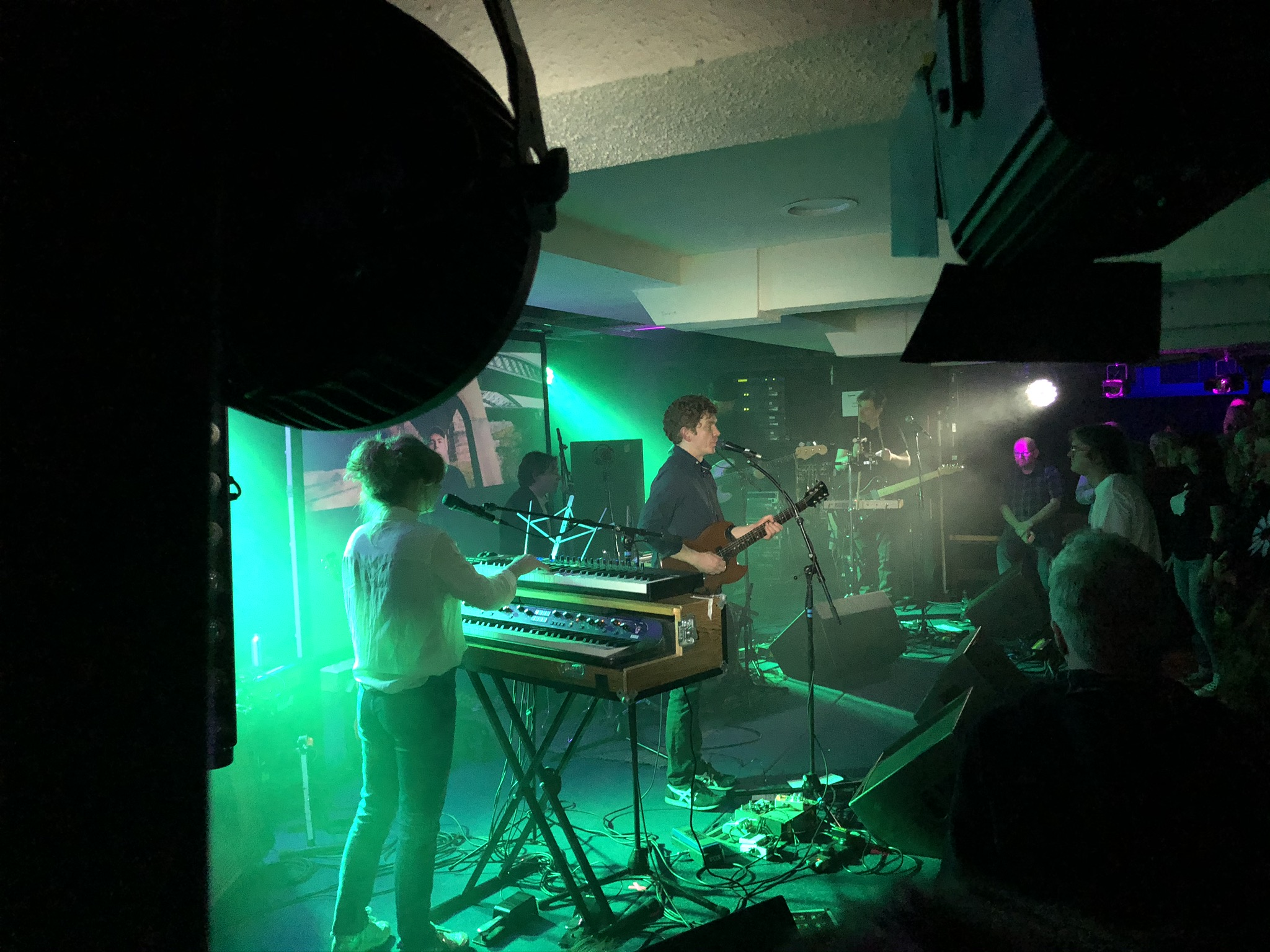
Field Music in Kendal 2020

In September 2013, it was revealed that Field Music had composed a soundtrack for the 1929 silent documentary Drifters. The film, which originally premiered alongside Eisenstein's Battleship Potemkin, was made by pioneering Scottish director John Grierson and follows the working day of a herring fishing fleet as it sets sail from the Shetland Islands. Field Music premiered the work with a live performance and screening for Berwick Film and Media Arts Festival. This commission saw the original line-up of Peter Brewis, David Brewis and Andrew Moore reunite for the first time since 2007. A subsequent screening and performance took place at London's Islington Assembly Hall in November 2013.

David Brewis played as a member of the touring band for former Fiery Furnaces singer Eleanor Friedberger on her UK tour in the summer of 2013. He released a second School of Language album – Old Fears – in April 2014. Both David Brewis and Peter Brewis joined their former bass player Ian Black in the band SLUG, touring as support to Hyde & Beast in the autumn of 2014. Peter Brewis also released an album, Frozen by Sight, in collaboration with Maxïmo Park's Paul Smith on 17 November 2014. This consisted of 'baroque-pop' compositions by Brewis with edited excerpts of Paul Smith's travel writing sung in Recitative. A live performance of the album was staged, with other musicians including a string section, at Gateshead's Sage.

In November 2015, Prince posted a link to Field Music's then-newly released single "The Noisy Days Are Over" on his Twitter feed. In February 2016 the band released their sixth album as Field Music, Commontime. They performed two songs from the album—including "Disappointed", which featured in the "live" edition of the programme—in the second episode of the 48th series of the BBC music show Later... with Jools Holland. The performance was cited in a BBC poll as one of the highlights of the series.

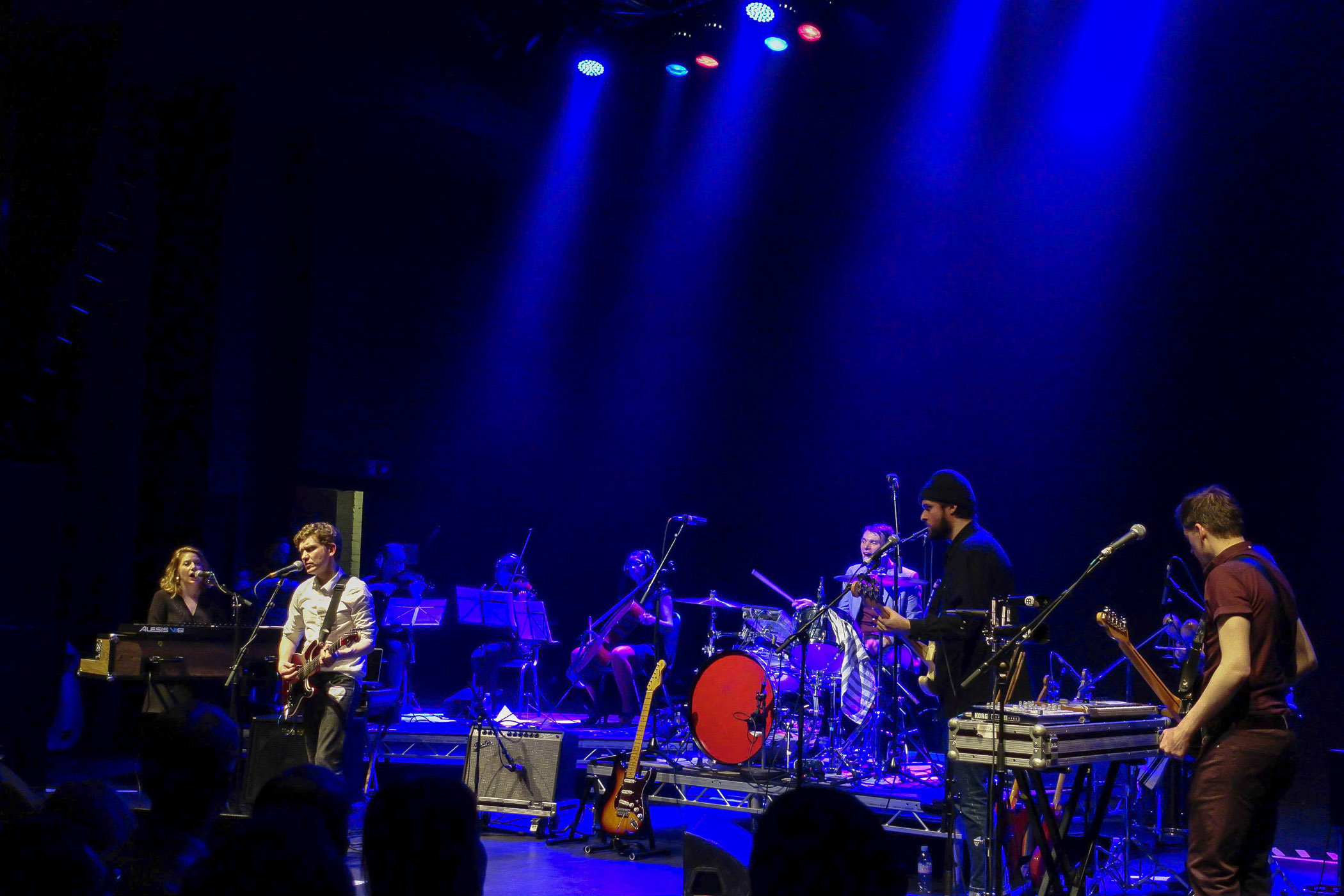
Field Music performing in London in October 2016

Early in 2016, the band completed their first UK tour in four years. It was followed up by a US tour, which included dates in Washington, Philadelphia, New York, Boston and Seattle. They also played in California for the first time since the tour to promote 2007's Tones of Town.

In 2016, Field Music worked with Newcastle duo Warm Digits on the soundtrack for the film Asunder, directed by Esther Johnson, commissioned as part of the 14-18 NOW series of events to commemorate the centenary of World War 1. Writing for The Guardian, the film's creative producer, Bob Stanley revealed that the compositions, which were scored for the Northern Sinfonia by Peter Brewis, had been inspired by Stravinsky, Schoenberg and Messiaen.

A seventh album, Open Here, was released in February 2018. The Guardian described it as a "grand masterclass in terrific tune-making".

An eighth album, Making a New World, was released on 10 January 2020. Keiron Tyler of The Art Desk called the album "a snappy pop funk with an Eighties [sic] feel."

== Discography ==
=== Studio albums ===
Title	Album details	Peak chart positions
Title	Album details	UK
Field Music	Released: 8 August 2005; Label: Memphis Industries	—
Tones of Town	Released: 22 January 2007; Label: Memphis Industries	112
Field Music (Measure)	Released: 15 February 2010; Label: Memphis Industries	53
Plumb	Released: 13 February 2012; Label: Memphis Industries	49
Commontime	Released: 5 February 2016; Label: Memphis Industries	36
Open Here	Released: 2 February 2018; Label: Memphis Industries	30
Making a New World	Released: 10 January 2020; Label: Memphis Industries	84
Flat White Moon	Released: 23 April 2021; Label: Memphis Industries	36
Limits of Language	Released: 11 October 2024; Label: Memphis Industries	65
"—" denotes album that did not chart or was not released

=== Compilations ===
- Write Your Own History – (early rarities and b-sides compilation) (9 May 2006)
- Field Music Play... (covers album) (1 October 2012)

=== Soundtracks ===
- Music for Drifters – 18 April 2015 (Record Store Day vinyl release); 24 July 2015 (wide digital release)

=== Live albums ===
- Live at Tapestry – 23 March 2020 (digital release of Feb 2006 recording, live at Tapestry Club, Roman Catholic Church of St Aloysius, Camden Town)

=== Field Music productions ===
==== Albums by David Brewis as School of Language ====
- Sea from Shore (4 February 2008)
- Old Fears (7 April 2014)
- 45 (30 May 2019)
- I Could Have Loved U Better (digital EP, 21 April 2020)

==== Albums by Peter Brewis ====
- The Week That Was (as the Week That Was) (18 August 2008)
- Frozen by Sight (with Paul Smith) (18 November 2014)
- You Tell Me (with Sarah Hayes as You Tell Me) (19 January 2019)

==== Other ====
- Elements of the Sun (10" vinyl EP, collaboration with Warm Digits for BBC Radio 3's Late Junction Sessions) (24 September 2012)
- Five Pieces for Roker, and Percussion ('found sound' works by Peter Brewis for the NGCA) (2013)

=== Singles ===
List of singles
Title	Year	Album
"Shorter Shorter"	2005	Field Music
"You Can Decide"	2005	Field Music
"If Only the Moon Were Up"	2005	Field Music
"You're Not Supposed To"	2006	Write Your Own History
"In Context"	2006	Tones of Town
"A House Is Not a Home"	2007	Tones of Town
"She Can Do What She Wants"	2007	Tones of Town
"Them That Do Nothing"	2010	Field Music (Measure)
"Let's Write a Book"	2010	Field Music (Measure)
"(I Keep Thinking About) A New Thing"	2011	Plumb
"A New Town"	2012	Plumb
"Who'll Pay the Bills?"	2012	Plumb
"The Noisy Days Are Over"	2016	Commontime
"Disappointed"	2016	Commontime
"Count It Up"	2017	Open Here
"Time in Joy"	2018	Open Here
"Share a Pillow"	2018	Open Here
"Only in a Man's World"	2019	Making a New World
"Money Is a Memory"	2019	Making a New World
"Home for Christmas"	2019	Non-album single
"Beyond That of Courtesy"	2019	Making a New World
"Do You Read Me?"	2020	Making a New World
"Home for Christmas" (re-issue)	2020	Lost Christmas: A Festive Memphis Industries Selection Box
"Orion from the Street"	2021	Flat White Moon
