= Sea from Shore =

Studio album by School of Language
- Released: 4 February 2008
- Studio: 8 Music, Sunderland
- Genre: Alternative rock
- Length: 39:50
- Label: Memphis Industries
- Producer: David Brewis

School of Language chronology
Sea from Shore (2008)	Old Fears (2014)

Singles from Sea from Shore
- 1. "Rockist Single" Released: 1 December 2007; 2. "Poor Boy EP" Released: 4 May 2008

Professional ratings
Review scores
Source	Rating
AllMusic	4/5 stars

Sea from Shore is the debut album by David Brewis' solo project, School of Language. The group was created by Brewis during Field Music's 2007 to 2009 hiatus, during which the two Brewis brothers Peter and David Brewis went off to pursue wider musical interests not under the Field Music umbrella. "Poor Boy" and "Rockist" were released as singles, the latter with a video. The version of "Rockist" released as a single is an edited version containing elements of both Parts 1 and 4, representing half of the overall work, the two halves of which bookend the album. "Rockist" was the album's biggest commercial success, with Part 1 being used in television adverts for the Ford Fiesta.

== Track listing ==
All songs written and composed by David Brewis.

1. "Rockist Part 1" – 2:16
2. "Rockist Part 2" – 3:14
3. "Disappointment '99" – 4:03
4. "Poor Boy" – 4:20
5. "Keep Your Water" – 5:22
6. "Marine Life" – 2:43
7. "Ships" – 2:47
8. "This Is No Fun" – 3:47
9. "Extended Holiday" – 3:20
10. "Rockist Part 3 (Aposiopesis)" – 2:12
11. "Rockist Part 4" – 5:32

== Personnel ==
- David Brewis (Field Music)
- Barry Hyde (The Futureheads) – guitar and backing vocals on "Disappointment '99"
- David Craig – backing vocals on "Disappointment '99" and "Extended Holiday"
- Marie Nixon (formerly Marie Du Santiago of Kenickie/Rosita) – backing vocals on "Disappointment '99" and "Extended Holiday"
- Sarah McKeown (also formerly of Rosita) – backing vocals on "Disappointment '99" and "Extended Holiday"
