= Slug (British band) =

SLUG
- Origin: Sunderland, England
- Genres: Indie rock, art rock, progressive pop
- Years active: 2014–present
- Label: Memphis Industries
- Members: Ian Black
- Website: slugband.co.uk

Slug (stylised as SLUG) is the musical project of Ian Black. Under the alias, Black has so far released two studio albums: Ripe (2015) and HiggledyPiggledy (2018). However, in September 2022 it was announced that his 3rd album Thy Socialite! will be released on 20 January 2023. Black had previously been a member of the North East surf-pop band The Bubble Project, as well a touring member of Field Music.

== Background ==
When Field Music's tour finished at the end of 2010, Ian Black decided to go out on his own and record his debut album. After years of demoing songs, Black recorded his debut album at Field Music's Roker studio with Peter and David Brewis on production duties. SLUG's debut album, RIPE, was released on 13 April 2015. He toured the record extensively, supporting the likes of FFS, British Sea Power and Dutch Uncles.

On 1 February 2018, SLUG announced his second record, HiggledyPiggledy, and shared the first single 'No Heavy Petting'. The album was composed, produced and played entirely by Black, inspired by a combination of The Residents, John Carpenter and the soundtracks of Don Cherry (particularly Holy Mountain) and Masahiko Sato (particularly Belladonna of Sadness). During the COVID-19 pandemic, SLUG released a 2015 live recording of a gig at The Hope & Ruin in Brighton as a digital album.

== Discography ==
=== Studio albums ===
- RIPE (2015)
- HiggledyPiggledy (2018)
- Thy Socialite! (2023)

=== Live albums ===
- Antediluvian Brutalist Boffola Instinct (2020)
