= Ripe (Slug album) =

RIPE

Studio album by SLUG
- Released: 13 April 2015
- Genre: Indie rock
- Length: 31:37
- Label: Memphis Industries

SLUG chronology
RIPE (2015)	HiggledyPiggledy (2018)

Professional ratings
Review scores
Source	Rating
The Line of Best Fit	8/10 stars
Drowned in Sound	8/10 stars
Modern Vinyl	89%
Pitchfork	6.9/10

Ripe is the debut album by SLUG, a Field Music production led by former Field Music touring bassist Ian Black. The tracks "Cockeyed Rabbit Wrapped in Plastic", "Running to Get Past Your Heart" and "Greasy Mind" were selected for radio promotion, with a video being produced for the latter. Ian Black describes the writing process for the album as a series of 'what-if' scenarios- "What if we take a stoner metal riff and use it like a dub bass part....that was the idea. Let's add some 4 part harmonies some squelch bass, some hisses and triangle and you've got a peculiar, sinister song." He has cited horror movie soundtracks by Fabio Frizzi, Goblin, Lalo Schifrin, Andrzej Korzyński and John Carpenter as a major influence on his songwriting. Creation and touring of the album was supported by Peter and David Brewis, the core members of Field Music itself.

== Track listing ==
1. "Grimacing Mask" – 1:21
2. "Cockeyed Rabbit Wrapped in Plastic" – 2:47
3. "Sha La La" – 2:58
4. "Eggs and Eyes" – 3:32
5. "Greasy Mind" – 2:36
6. "Shake Your Loose Teeth" – 3:53
7. "Weight of Violence" – 2:29
8. "Running to Get Past Your Heart" – 2:25
9. "Peng Peng" – 3:06
10. "Kill Your Darlings" – 3:16
11. "At Least Show That You Care" – 3:14

== Personnel ==
- Ian Black
- Andrew Lowther
- Rhys Patterson
- Peter Brewis (Field Music)
- David Brewis (Field Music)
- Hugo Everard - Brass
- Tom Dixon - Brass
