= The Week That Was =

Studio album by The Week That Was
- Released: 18 August 2008
- Studios: 8 Music, Sunderland
- Genre: Alternative rock
- Length: 32:40
- Label: Memphis Industries
- Producer: David Brewis

Singles from The Week That Was
- 1. "Scratch the Surface" Released: 1 June 2008; 2. "The Airport Line" Released: 14 September 2008

Professional ratings
Aggregate scores
Source	Rating
Metacritic	82/100
Review scores
Source	Rating
AllMusic	4/5 stars
The A.V. Club	A
Drowned in Sound	9/10
Mojo	4/5 stars
NME	8/10
Now	4/5 stars
The Observer	4/5 stars
Pitchfork	8.2/10
PopMatters	7/10
Uncut	4/5 stars

The Week That Was is the side-project of Peter Brewis, member of the Sunderland art-rock band Field Music. The group was created by Brewis during Field Music's 2007-2009 hiatus, during which the two Brewis brothers Peter & David Brewis went off to pursue wider musical interests not under the 'Field Music' umbrella. However, as both David Brewis and former Field Music member Andrew Moore feature on the self-titled album, it is labelled as an album by "The Week That Was & Field Music" on iTunes. The group also includes musicians frequently used in Field Music's album sessions, such as Emma Fisk and Peter Richardson on strings. Like Field Music, the songs are in a progressive, fractured style often operating outside of standard verse/chorus structures. However, there are some more radio-friendly songs on the album than Field Music's work, and The Week That Was also has wider and more elaborate use of instrumentation, particularly orchestral instruments.

The album's lyrics were inspired by "Paul Auster's labyrinthine storytelling", based around "an imagined crime thriller". Though there is little evidence to suggest a narrative in the finished product, the songs are intended to be seen as musical snapshots from within this frame, moments taken from the perspectives of onlookers, perpetrators and victims. The album was written in a single week, after Brewis was inspired having just thrown out his TV and wondering how people would react without modern information technology keeping them updated on the news, etc. It has been suggested by multiple sources that the crime in the album's suggested narrative is a kidnapping, a theory supported by the fact that the high-profile Madeleine McCann case had recently occurred at the time of the album's writing. It has also been suggested that the last song, Scratch The Surface, may be from the point of view of the kidnapper if this is the case, hence the lyric “Don’t you read the paper? / You’re bound to find me later”. The album had two main singles, 'The Airport Line' and 'Scratch The Surface', with a video for the latter. 'Learn To Learn' was released as a promo-only single with an accompanying video.

== Track listing ==
All songs written and composed by Peter Brewis.

1. "Learn to Learn" – 3:06
2. "The Good Life" – 2:42
3. "The Story Waits for No One" – 2:52
4. "It's All Gone Quiet" – 3:24
5. "The Airport Line" – 3:56
6. "Yesterday's Paper" – 7:01
7. "Come Home" – 5:10
8. "Scratch the Surface" – 4:29

== Personnel ==
Field Music

- Peter Brewis – vocals, guitar, bass, drums, piano, keyboards, marimba
- David Brewis – vocals, bass, sampling
- Andrew Moore – piano, keyboards

Additional personnel

- Jordan Hill – additional drums
- Emma Fisk – violins
- Pauline Brandon – violins
- Peter Richardson – cello
- Richard Admundsen – backing vocals
- Jennie Redmond – backing vocals
- Laura Cullen – flutes
- Peter Gofton – vibraphone
- John Beattie – cornets
