= Drifters (1929 film) =

1929 British film by John Grierson

- Directed by: John Grierson
- Produced by: John Grierson
- Cinematography: DOP Basil Emmott
- Production companies: New Era Films; Empire Marketing Board Film Unit
- Release date: 1929
- Running time: 61 minutes
- Country: United Kingdom
- Language: English
- Budget: £3,000

Drifters is a 1929 silent documentary film by John Grierson, his first and only "personal" film.

It tells the story of Britain's North Sea herring fishery. The film's style has been described as being a "response to avant-garde, Modernist films, adopting formal techniques such as montage – constructive editing emphasising the rhythmic juxtaposition of images – but also aimed to make a socially directed commentary on its subject" (Tate Gallery: Liverpool 2006). The film was successful both critically and commercially and helped kick off Grierson's documentary film movement. This film also showed that Grierson was not afraid to alter reality slightly in order to have his vision shown. For example, when the boat he was on returned without a catch he bought another boat's catch and tried to fake it. He ended up scrapping that film as it was not authentic enough.

== Release ==
The film was shown alongside Battleship Potemkin's premiere in London.

== See also ==
- Music for Drifters

== Works cited ==
- Khouri, Malek (2007). Filming Politics: Communism and the Portrayal of the Working Class at the National Film Board of Canada, 1939-46. University of Calgary Press. ISBN 9781552381991.
