= Tones of Town =

Studio album by Field Music
- Released: 22 January 2007
- Genre: Indie rock
- Length: 31:41
- Label: Memphis Industries

Field Music chronology
Write Your Own History (2006)	Tones of Town (2007)	Field Music (Measure) (2010)

Professional ratings
Aggregate scores
Source	Rating
Metacritic	80/100
Review scores
Source	Rating
AllMusic	4/5 stars
Drowned in Sound	10/10
The Guardian	4/5 stars
The Observer	4/5 stars
Pitchfork	7.3/10
The Sunday Times	2/5 stars
The Times	4/5 stars
Uncut	4/5 stars

Tones of Town is the second studio album by indie rock band Field Music. It was released on 22 January 2007. "In Context" (w/b 'Off & On'), "A House Is Not a Home" (w/b 'Logic') and "She Can Do What She Wants" (w/b 'Sit Tighter', an alternate version of 'Sit Tight') were released as singles.

== Track listing ==
1. "Give It Lose It Take It" – 3:56
2. "Sit Tight" – 3:02
3. "Tones of Town" – 3:06
4. "A House Is Not a Home" – 2:36
5. "Kingston" – 1:54
6. "Working to Work" – 2:51
7. "In Context" – 3:37
8. "A Gap Has Appeared" – 2:01
9. "Closer at Hand" – 2:30
10. "Place Yourself" – 3:01
11. "She Can Do What She Wants"/"Outro" – 3:07

== Personnel ==
Field Music

- Peter Brewis
- David Brewis
- Andrew Moore

Additional personnel

- Emma Fisk – violins
- Rachel Davis – violins
- Peter Richardson – cello
- Peter Gofton – vibraphone
- Graeme Hopper – vibraphone
