= Field Music (album) =

Studio album by Field Music
- Released: 8 August 2005
- Genre: Indie rock
- Length: 37:49
- Label: Memphis Industries

Field Music chronology
Field Music (2005)	Write Your Own History (2006)

Professional ratings
Aggregate scores
Source	Rating
Metacritic	77/100
Review scores
Source	Rating
AllMusic	4/5 stars
Drowned in Sound	8.0/10
Pitchfork	7.6/10

Field Music is the full-length debut album by indie rock band Field Music. It was released on 8 August 2005. While digital versions of the album have a white background, the CD packaging was printed on brown card. "If Only The Moon Were Up", "Shorter Shorter" and "You Can Decide" were released as singles.

In October 2025, the album was reissued with an expanded 20th anniversary edition, featuring b-sides and three previously-unreleased tracks.

== Track listing ==
1. "If Only the Moon Were Up" – 3:02
2. "Tell Me Keep Me" – 3:13
3. "Pieces" – 3:02
4. "Luck Is a Fine Thing" – 2:18
5. "Shorter Shorter" – 1:56
6. "It's Not the Only Way to Feel Happy" – 5:21
7. "17" – 2:43
8. "Like When You Meet Someone Else" – 3:22
9. "You Can Decide" – 2:15
10. "Got to Get the Nerve" – 4:03
11. "Got to Write a Letter" – 3:12
12. "You're So Pretty..." – 3:22

US bonus tracks - also available on Write Your Own History

1. "You're Not Supposed To" – 2:36
2. "Trying to Sit Out" – 1:48
3. "I'm Tired" – 2:47

== Personnel ==
Field Music

- Peter Brewis
- David Brewis
- Andrew Moore

Additional personnel

- Emma Fisk – violins
- Rachel Davis – violins
- Peter Richardson – cello
- John Steele – saxophone
- Tom English (Maxïmo Park) – drums
