= Memphis Industries =

British independent record label

- Founded: 1998
- Official website: www.memphis-industries.com

Memphis Industries is a British independent record label.

Memphis Industries was established as a record label in 1998 by the brothers Ollie and Matt Jacob with the first release being Blue States' Forever EP. It is perhaps best known for The Go! Team and Field Music. The label also served as British distributor for the Swedish group Dungen.

== Roster ==
- Absentee
- Arthur & Yu
- Barbarossa
- The Black Neon
- Black Moth Super Rainbow
- Blue States
- Bricolage
- Broadway Project
- Colourmusic
- Cymbals Eat Guitars
- Dan Michaelson & The Coastguards
- Dungen
- Dutch Uncles
- Dreamend
- Elephant
- El Perro del Mar
- Field Music
- Fort Lauderdale
- Frankie Rose and the Outs
- The Go! Team
- Haley Bonar
- Hooray For Earth
- J. Xaverre
- Jukeboxer
- Le Loup
- Menace Beach
- Milagres
- Nadine
- NZCA Lines
- Papercuts
- Peter Matthew Bauer
- The Pipettes
- The Phoenix Foundation
- Poliça
- Pure Bathing Culture
- The Ruby Suns
- The Russian Futurists
- School of Language
- The Scantharies
- The Shaky Hands
- Slug
- Supreme Cuts
- The Squire of Somerton
- The Week That Was
- Tokyo Police Club
- Weaves

== See also ==
- List of record labels
