= TwickFolk =

UK acoustic music events organization

Coordinates: 51°26′56″N 0°19′48″W

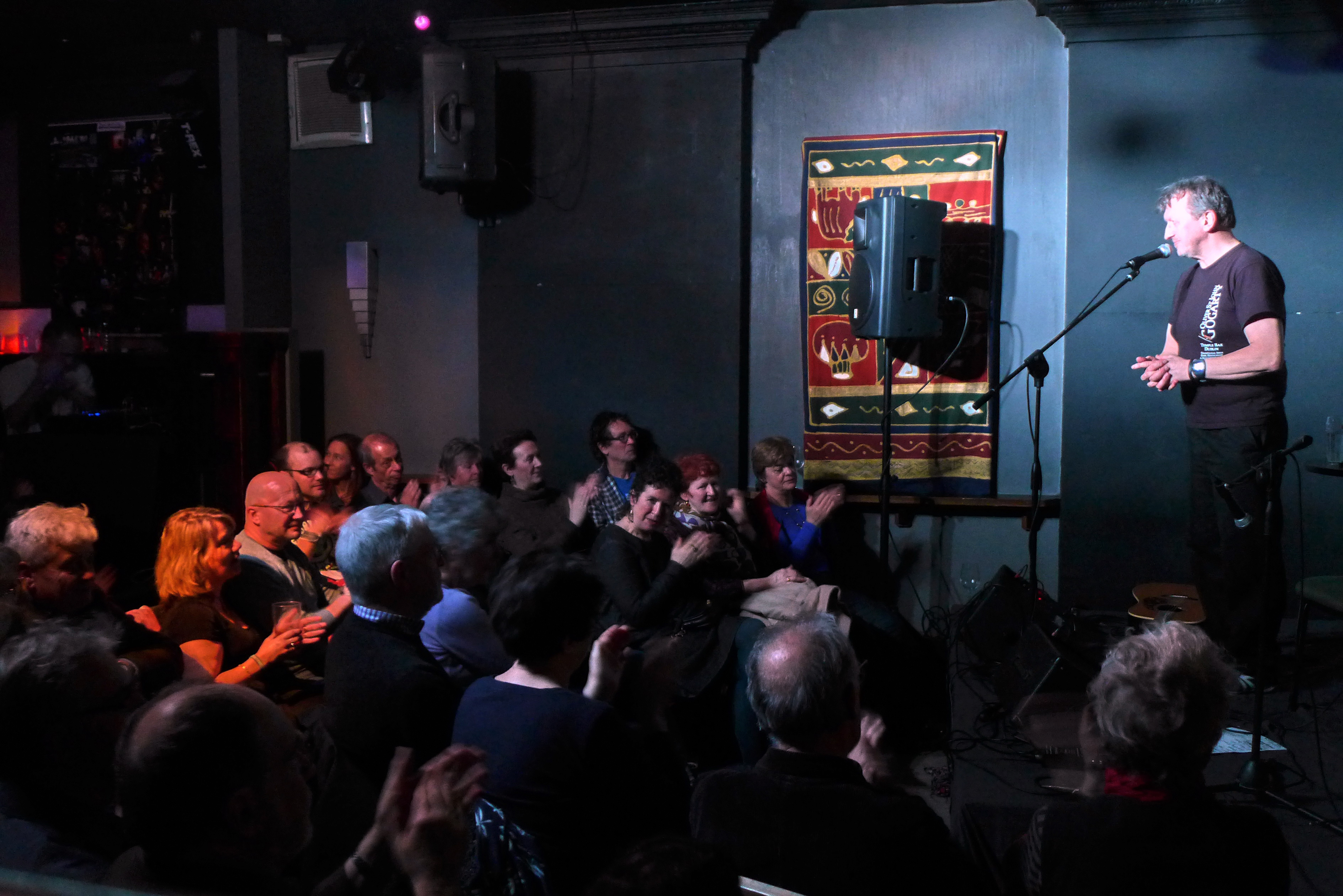
- Gerry Evans compering for TwickFolk at The Cabbage Patch pub's upstairs "Patch Bar", March 2014
- Founded: 1983
- Type: acoustic music organisation run entirely by volunteers
- Legal status: registered charity
- Purpose: acoustic folk and roots-based music
- Location: Twickenham, London Borough of Richmond upon Thames, England, UK
- Method: concerts
- Revenue: ticket sales
- Employees: none
- Website: www.twickfolk.co.uk

TwickFolk (previously known as Twickenham Folk Club) organises acoustic music events in and around Twickenham, in the London Borough of Richmond upon Thames. A registered charity, it is run, not for profit, by a small group of volunteers. It was established in January 1983 and is now one of the best known and most highly respected folk clubs in London and the South East of England.

TwickFolk organises gigs on Sunday evenings, usually at the Patchworks music venue at The Cabbage Patch pub in London Road, Twickenham, featuring British and North American acoustic folk and roots-based music in a programme that includes blues, country music and Americana as well as traditional folk music. The evening usually consists of a main "guest" preceded by a support act or several floor spots.

Occasionally TwickFolk organises singers' nights. These consist of either several performed floor spots or an unplugged singaround where everyone sits in a circle and those who want to sing or play an instrument can take turns to do so. TwickFolk has also organised workshops on building a cigar box guitar and on playing guitar and nyckelharpa.

TwickFolk has also held fundraising nights benefiting national and local charities.

== Performers ==
Guests who have appeared at TwickFolk include Nels Andrews, Les Barker, Sally Barker, Bird in the Belly, Alyssa Bonagura, Maggie Boyle and Paul Downes, Chuck Brodsky, The Carrivick Sisters, Olivia Chaney, Charlie Dore and Julian Littman, Kris Drever, Gareth Dunlop, Ana Egge, Carrie Elkin, Mark Erelli, Stephen Fearing, David Francey, Vin Garbutt, Dick Gaughan, Melissa Greener, Sid Griffin, Jack Harris, Hatful of Rain, Rebecca Hollweg, Luke Jackson, Robb Johnson, Diana Jones, Kara, Sam Kelly Trio, Lau, Sarah McQuaid, Madison Violet, Emily Maguire, Iain Matthews, Megson, Jim Moray, Jess Morgan, Elliott Morris, Pete Morton, O'Hooley & Tidow, Earl Okin, Ellis Paul, Rod Picott, Rebecca Pronsky, Kim Richey, Justin Rutledge, Southern Tenant Folk Union, Sunjay, Miranda Sykes, Greg Trooper, Dan Walsh, Kevin Welch, Dan Wilde, Brian Willoughby and Chris Wood.

== Broadcasts ==
In March 2014 BBC Radio Wales marked the Six Nations rugby tournament by broadcasting live, from Isleworth's Red Lion pub, a concert, Twickenham Heartbeat, in its folk roots and acoustic music programme Celtic Heartbeat. Hosted by Frank Hennessy and Bethan Elfyn, it featured performers from TwickFolk, and special guests including Ralph McTell.

== Gallery ==
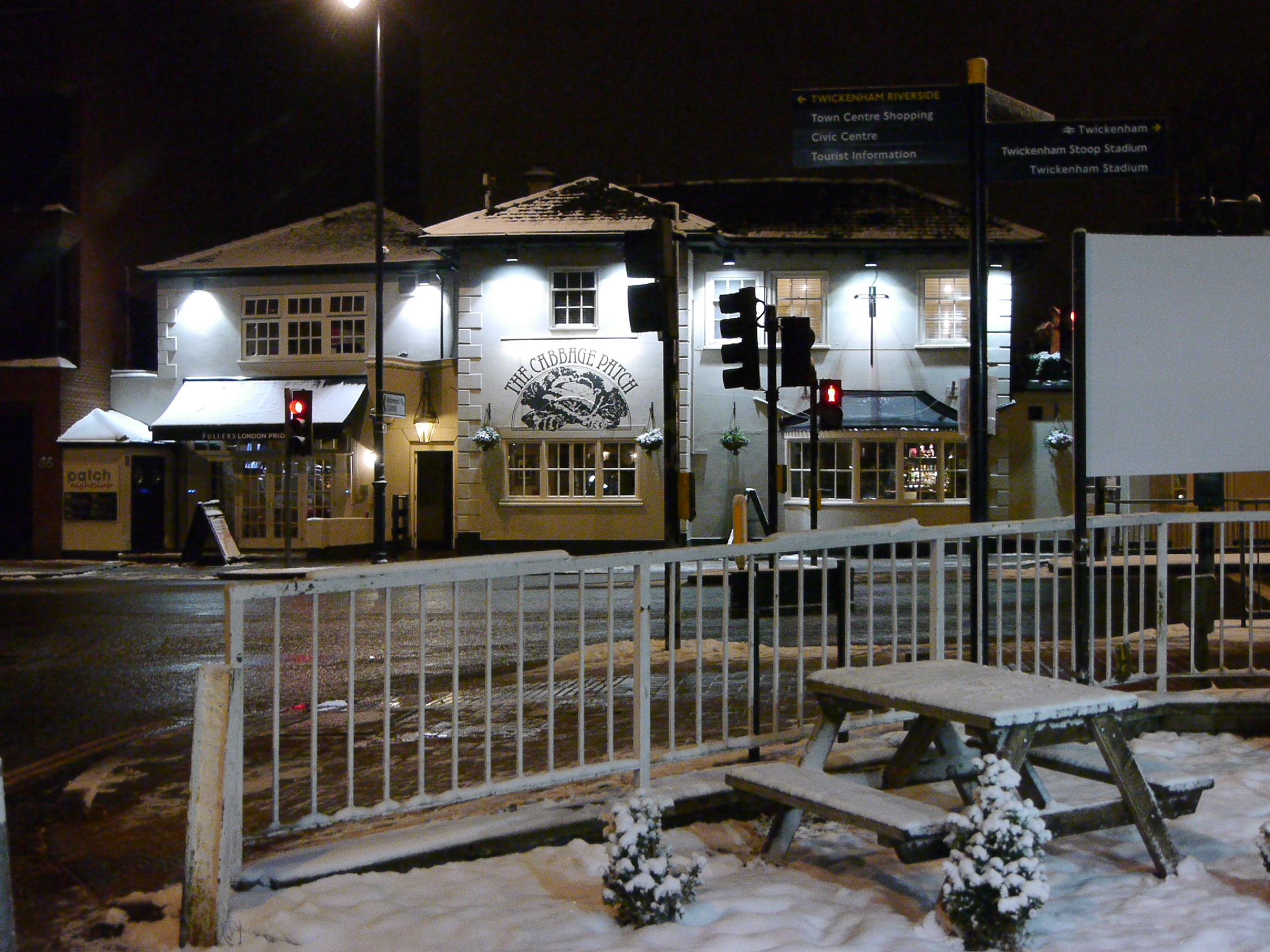
The Cabbage Patch pub in Twickenham

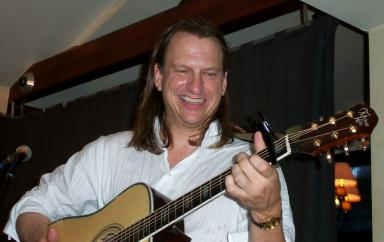
Ellis Paul at TwickFolk, May 2006

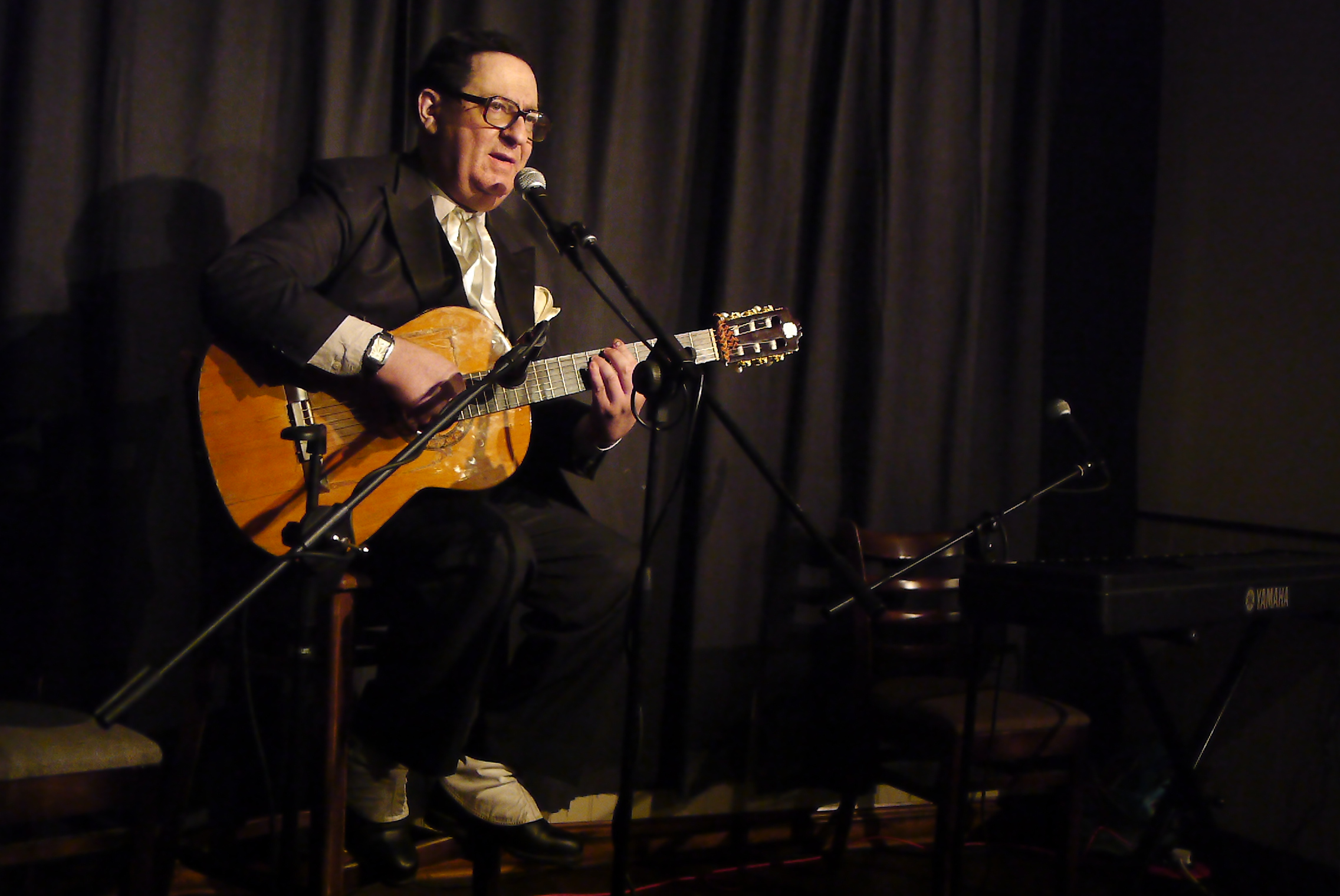
Earl Okin at TwickFolk, February 2014

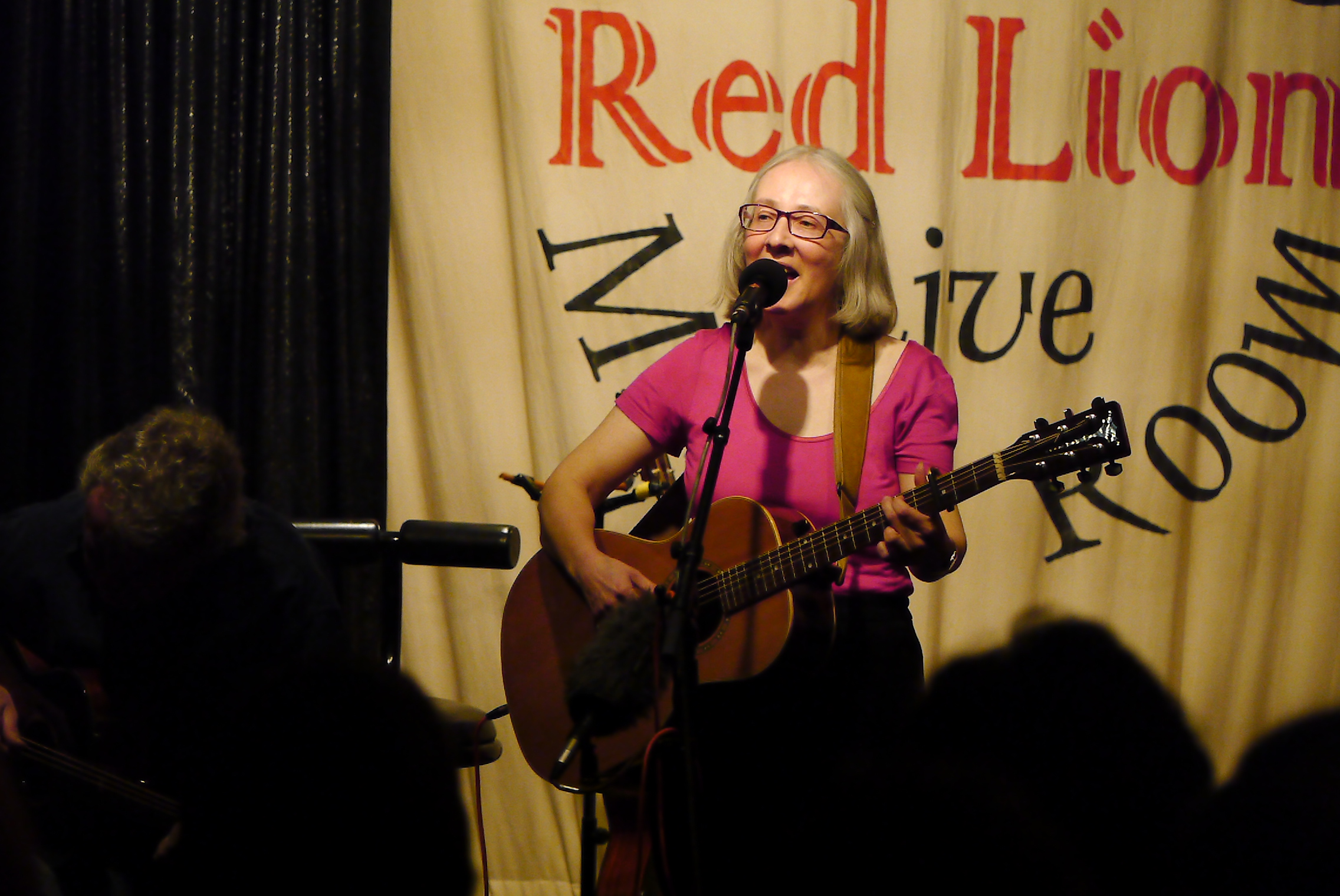
Sue Graves performing at Isleworth's Red Lion pub at a TwickFolk concert, Twickenham Heartbeat, recorded and broadcast live by BBC Radio Wales on 9 March 2014

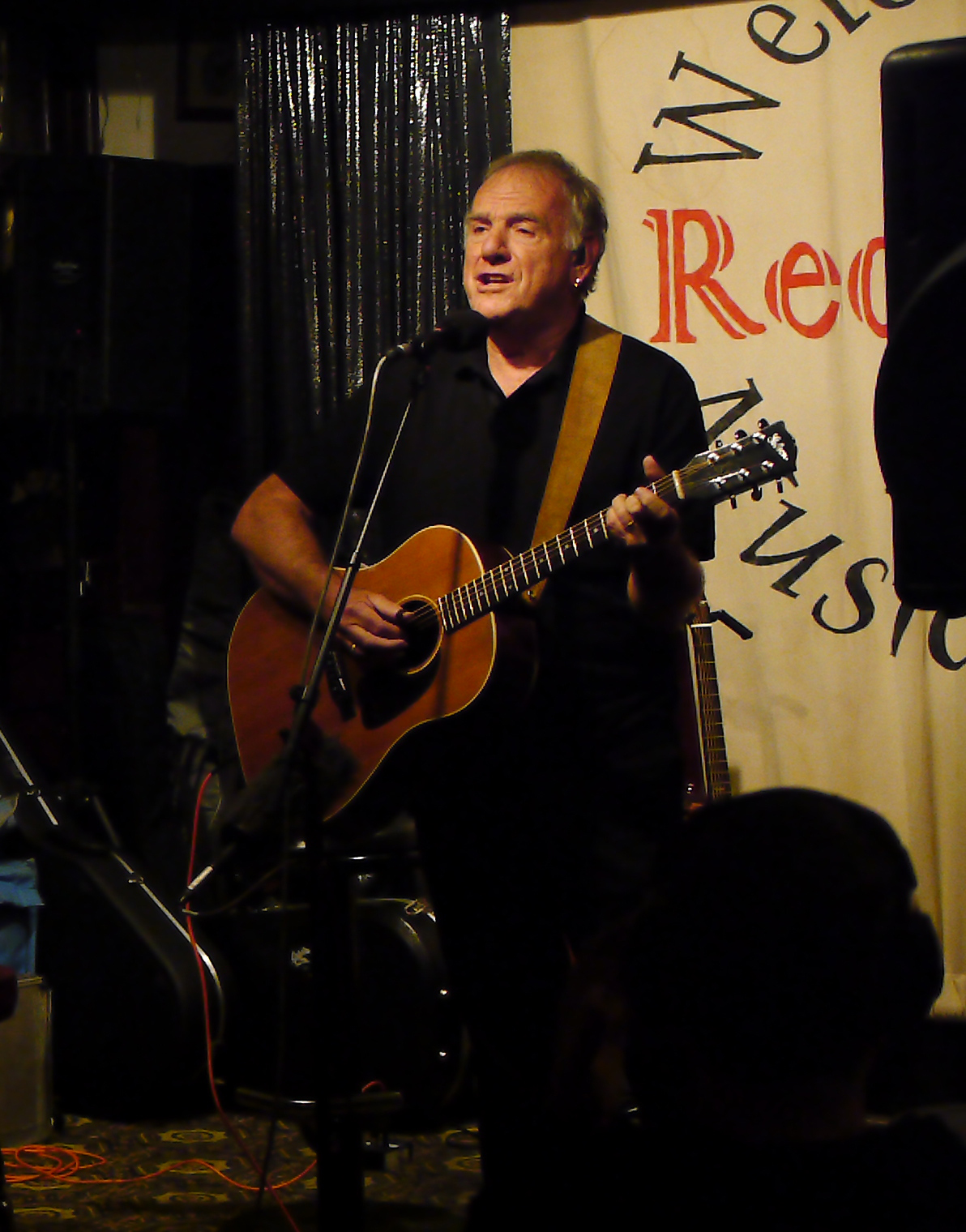
Ralph McTell performing for TwickFolk, March 2014

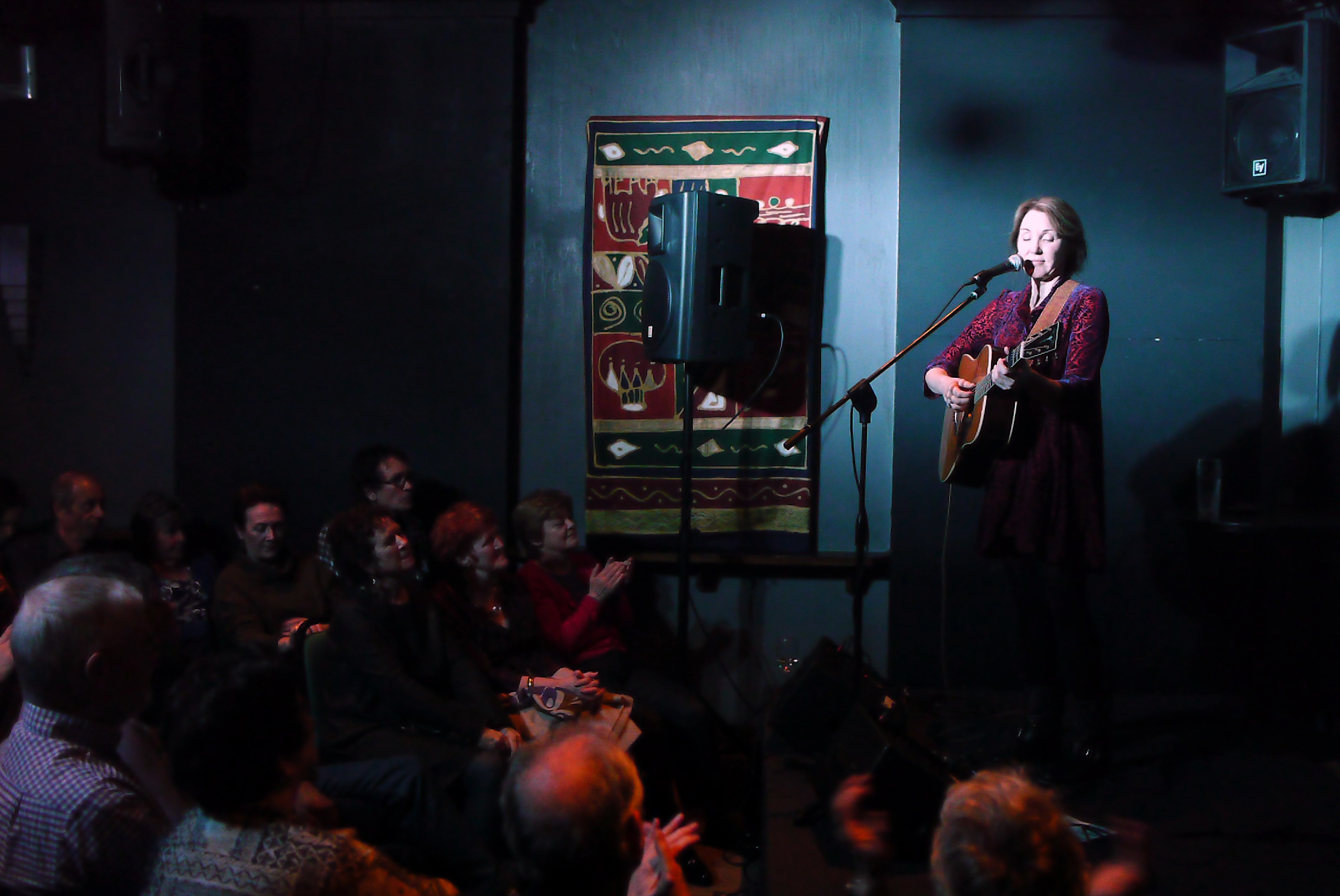
Diana Jones at TwickFolk, March 2014

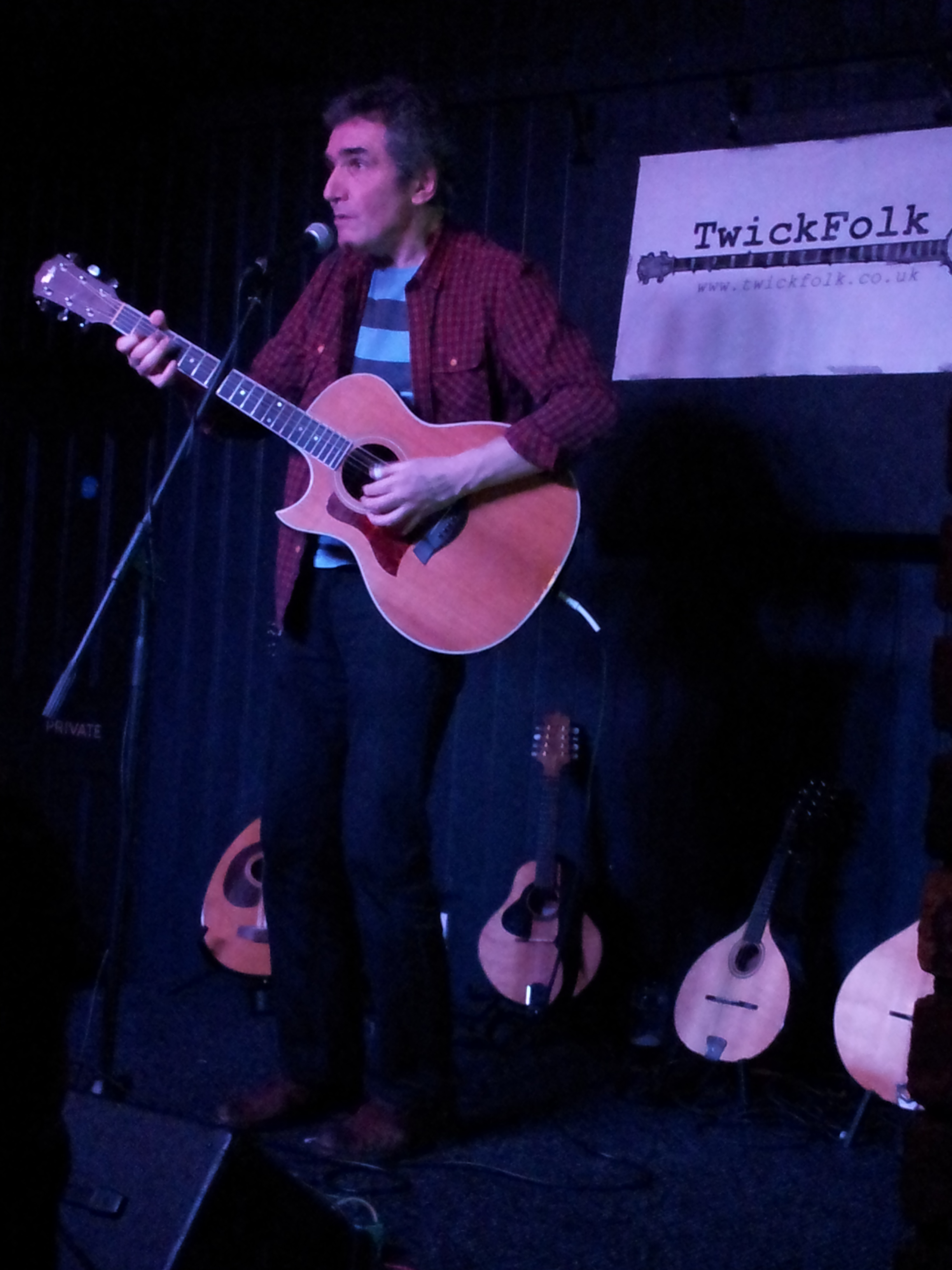
Jez Lowe performing at TwickFolk, February 2015
