= Economy of the Isle of Man =

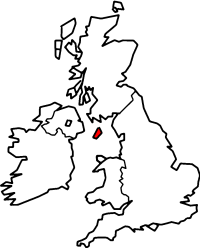
Location of the Isle of Man within the British Isles

The economy of the Isle of Man is a low-tax economy with insurance, online gambling operators and developers, information and communications technology (ICT), and offshore banking forming key sectors of the island's economy.

As an offshore financial centre located in the Irish Sea, the Isle of Man is within the British Isles but does not form part of the United Kingdom and was never a part of the European Union.

As of 2016, the Crown dependency's gross national income (GNI) per capita was US$89,970 as assessed by the World Bank. The Isle of Man Government's own National Income Report shows the largest sectors of the economy are insurance and eGaming with 17% of GNI each, followed by ICT and banking with 9% each, with tourist accommodation in the lowest sector at 0.3%.

== Economic performance ==
After 32 years of continued Gross Domestic Product (GDP) growth, the financial year 2015/16 showed the first drop in GDP, of 0.9%, triggered by decline in eGaming revenues.

The unemployment rate is around 5%.

Property prices are flat or declining, but recent figures also show an increase in resident income tax payers.

The government's policy of offering incentives to high-technology companies and financial institutions to locate on the island has expanded employment opportunities in high-income industries. Agriculture, fishing, and the hospitality industry, once the mainstays of the economy, now make declining contributions to the island's GNP. The hospitality sector contributed just of 0.3% of GNP in 2015/16, and 629 jobs in 2016. eGaming and ICT contribute the great bulk of GNP. The stability of the island's government and its openness for business make the Isle of Man an attractive alternative jurisdiction (DAW Index ranked 3).

== Economic strategy ==
In the Vision2020 the Isle of Man government lays out the national strategy of economic growth, seeking an increase of the economically active population an promoting the Island as an 'Enterprise Island, ''Tech Isle', 'Manufacturing centre of excellence', 'Offshore energy hub', 'Destination Island' and for 'Distinctive local food and drink'. The government has published its national economic strategies for several emerging sectors: aerospace, biomed, digital media, ICT.

== Taxation and trade ==
=== Tax rates ===
The Isle of Man is a low-tax economy with no capital gains tax, wealth tax, stamp duty, or inheritance tax; and a top rate of income tax of 22%. A tax cap is in force: the maximum amount of tax payable by an individual is £200,000; or £400,000 for couples if they choose to have their incomes jointly assessed. Personal income is assessed and taxed on a total worldwide income basis rather than on a remittance basis. This means that all income earned throughout the world is assessable for Manx tax, rather than only income earned in or brought into the Island.

The standard rate of corporation tax for residents and non-residents is 0%; retail business profits above £500,000 and banking business income are taxed at 10%, and rental (or other) income from land and buildings situated on the Isle of Man is taxed at 22%.

=== Trade ===
Trade is mostly with the United Kingdom. The Isle of Man has free access to European Union markets for goods, but only has restricted access for services, people, or financial products.

=== Tax transparency and the offshore banking debate ===
The Isle of Man as an offshore financial centre has been repeatedly featured in the press as a tax haven, most recently in the wake of the Paradise Papers.

The Organisation for Economic Co-operation and Development's (OECD) Global Forum on Transparency and Exchange of Information for Tax Purposes has rated the Isle of Man as 'top compliant' for a second time: a status which only three jurisdictions in the world have achieved so far. The island has become the second nation after Austria to ratify a multilateral convention with the OECD to implement measures to prevent Base Erosion and Profit Shifting (BEPS).

In a report the European Council lists the Isle of Man together with the other two Crown Dependencies (Guernsey and Jersey) as well as Bermuda, the Cayman Islands and Vanuatu, as committed to addressing the Council's concerns of "Existence of tax regimes that facilitate offshore structures which attract profits without real economic activity" by 2018.

== Sectors ==
The Isle of Man's Department for Enterprise manages the diversified economy in twelve key sectors. The largest individual sectors by GNI are insurance and eGaming with 17% of GNI each, followed by ICT and banking with 9% each. The 2016 census lists 41,636 total employed. The largest sectors by employment are "medical and health", "financial and business services", construction, retail and public administration. Manufacturing, focused on aerospace and the food and drink industry, employs almost 2000 workers and contributes about 5% of GDP. The sector provides laser optics, industrial diamonds, electronics, plastics and aerospace precision engineering.

=== Finance sector ===
Insurance, banking (includes retail banking, offshore banking and other banking services), other finance and business services, and corporate service providers together contribute the most to the GNI and most of the jobs, with 10,057 people employed in 2016.

=== eGaming & ICT ===
Among the largest employers of the Island's private sector are eGaming (online gambling) companies like The Stars Group, Microgaming, Newfield, and Playtech. The Manx eGaming Association MEGA is representing the sector. Licenses are issued by the Gambling Supervision Commission.

In 2005 PokerStars, one of the world's largest online poker sites, relocated its headquarters to the Isle of Man from Costa Rica. In 2006, RNG Gaming a large gaming software developer of P2P tournaments and Get21, a multiplayer online blackjack site, based their corporate offices on the island.

The Isle of Man Government Lottery operated from 1986 to 1997. Since 2 December 1999 the island has participated in the United Kingdom National Lottery. The island is the only jurisdiction outside the United Kingdom where it is possible to play the UK National Lottery. Since 2010 it has also been possible for projects in the Isle of Man to receive national lottery Good Causes Funding. The good causes funding is distributed by the Manx Lottery Trust. Tynwald receives the 12p lottery duty for tickets sold in the Island.

The shortage of workers with ICT skills is tackled by several initiatives, like an IT and education campus, a new cyber security degree at the University College of Man, a Code Club, and a work permit waiver for skilled immigrants.

=== Filmmaking and digital media ===
Since 1995 Isle of Man Film has co-financed and co-produced over 100 feature film and television dramas which have all filmed on the Island.

Among the most successful productions funded in part by Isle of Man Film agency were Waking Ned, where the Manx countryside stood in for rural Ireland, and films like Stormbreaker, Shergar, Tom Brown's Schooldays, I Capture the Castle, The Libertine, Island at War (TV series), Five Children and It, Colour Me Kubrick, Sparkle, and others. Other films that have been filmed on the Isle of Man include Thomas and the Magic Railroad, Harry Potter and the Chamber of Secrets, Keeping Mum and Mindhorn.

2011 Isle of Man Film Oxford Economics was commissioned by Isle of Man Film Ltd to conduct a study into the economic impact of the film industry on the Isle of Man. The recommendation of this report for Isle of Man Film was to partner with a more established film institution in the UK to source more Isle of Man film production opportunities. This led to the investment of the Isle of Man Government to take shares in Pinewood Shepperton Plc which were sold later with profit.

The Isle of Man, in the British Isles, hopes to use its strong foundation in film to grow its television and new digital media industry. In a recent Isle of Man Department of Economic Development strategic review, the Island's over 2,000 jobs in the digital sector feature 'digital media' and the creative industries, and embrace partnerships with the industry and its individual sector bodies like the Isle of Media, a new media cluster.

=== Motorsports ===
Hosting of motorsports events, like the Isle of Man Car Rally and the more prominent TT motorcycle races, contributes to the tourism economy.

=== Tourism ===
Tourism in the Isle of Man developed from advances in transport to the island. In 1819 the first steamship Robert Bruce came to the island, only seven years after the first steam vessel in the UK. In the 1820s, tourism was growing due to improved transport. The island government's own report for the financial years 2014/15-2015/16 shows tourist accommodation to be in the lowest sector at 0.3%, ranking slightly above 'mining and quarrying' (0.1%).

== Infrastructure ==
=== Electricity ===
Since 1999, the Isle of Man has received electricity through the world's second longest submarine AC cable, the 90 kV Isle of Man to England Interconnector, as well as from a natural gas power station in Douglas, an oil power station in Peel and a small hydro-electric power station in Sulby Glen.

=== Gas ===
Gas for lighting and heating has been supplied to users on the Isle of Man since 1836, firstly as town gas, then as liquid petroleum gas (LPG); since 2003 natural gas has been available. The future use of hydrogen as a supplementary or substitute fuel is being studied.

=== Broadband ===
The Island is connected with five submarine cables to the UK and Ireland.

While the Isle of Man Communications Commission refers to Akamai’s recent State of the Internet Report for Q1 2017, with "the Island ranked 8th in the world for percentage of broadband connections with >4 Mb/s connectivity, with 96% of users connecting at speeds greater than 4 Mb/s", an "international league table of broadband speeds puts the Isle of Man at 50th in the world". Manx Telecom recently announced to roll out Fibre-to-the-Home (FTTH) superfast broadband with download speeds of up to 1Gigabit per second.

=== Travel links ===
Ronaldsway Airport links the Isle of Man with six airlines to eleven UK and Irish scheduled flight destinations.

The Steam Packet Company provides ferry services to Liverpool, Heysham, Belfast and Dublin.

== Statistics ==
Labour force—by occupation: agriculture, forestry and fishing 3%, manufacturing 11%, construction 10%, transport and communication 8%, wholesale and retail distribution 11%, professional and scientific services 18%, public administration 6%, banking and finance 18%, tourism 2%, entertainment and catering 3%, miscellaneous services 10%

Unemployment rate: nominally 5.0% (July 2020)

Industries: financial services, light manufacturing, tourism

Agriculture—products: cereals, vegetables, cattle, sheep, pigs, poultry

Exports: $NA

Exports—commodities: tweeds, herring, processed shellfish, beef, lamb

Exports—partners: UK

Imports: $NA

Imports—commodities: timber, fertilizers, fish

Imports—partners: UK

Debt—external: $NA

Economic aid—recipient: $NA

Currency: 1 Isle of Man pound = 100 pence

Exchange rates: the Manx pound is at par with the British pound

Fiscal year: 1 April – 31 March

== See also ==
- Economy of Europe
