= Boots Met My Face =

Studio album by Admiral Fallow
- Released: 26 April 2010
- Recorded: Chem19 Studios, Blantyre, Scotland
- Genre: Indie pop
- Length: 46:24
- Label: Lo-Five
- Producer: Paul Savage

Admiral Fallow chronology
Boots Met My Face (2010)	Tree Bursts In Snow (2012)

Boots Met My Face is the debut studio album by the Scottish indie pop band Admiral Fallow. Written by the band between 2006 and 2009, it was released in April 2010 by Blantyre-based studios Chem19. The album was produced in association with Paul Savage, the former drummer of indie rock band The Delgados.

== Background ==
Lead singer and main writer Louis Abbott has said that "All of the songs document the first chapter of my life, be it memories from school or kicking a ball about with my childhood chums. All are taken from real life events. There's no fiction. I'm not into making up stories or characters for the sake of trying to stir emotions. They are songs about friends and family as well as a fair bit of self-evaluation". Funding for the album was assisted by Creative Scotland. The album was also released internationally, through Indigo Records. The album art is a photo taken at Salen Bay at the Isle of Mull.

== Critical reception ==
Professional ratings
Review scores
Source	Rating
BBC	9/10 stars
Drowned in Sound	7/10 stars
The List	4/5 stars
Mojo	6/10 stars

The album was met with very positive reviews. Mike Diver for the BBC stated "surprising and enthralling, entrancing through simplicity, through finely crafted material played superbly well. It is, probably, the best album of folk-goes-indie-with-a-Scottish-accent since The Great Eastern. The band never over-stretches itself; Abbott never sings as if his life truly depends on it. And he’s right to do so: there are more important things in this world than songs, of course. But there are plenty of songs here that will perfectly complement the significant moments in your own life."

Neil Ashman March for Drowned in Sound said: "Abbot has described the record as being informed by the experiences of his youth and those he knows and on the whole it is a record suggestive of a reflective, varied and ambivalent view of the past as opposed to an altogether turbulent one. It proves Admiral Fallow, and in particular Louis Abbott, to be endowed with enough melodic, lyrical and compositional talent to believe that their best is still to come."

== Track listing ==
No.	Title	Length
1.	"Dead Against Smoking"	5:46
2.	"Squealing Pigs"	3:22
3.	"Subbuteo"	4:57
4.	"Delivered"	2:58
5.	"These Barren Years"	3:38
6.	"Old Balloons"	5:17
7.	"Bomb Through The Town"	5:27
8.	"Four Bulbs"	2:21
9.	"Taste The Coast"	4:42
10.	"Dead Leg"	6:55
11.	"The Sad Clown Cast"	3:01
Total length:		52:39

== Personnel ==
- Louis Abbott – guitar, lyricist, vocals
- Kevin Brolly – clarinet, drums, piano, vocals
- Phillip Hague – drums, vibraphone, vocals
- Sarah Hayes – flute, piano, vocals
- Johan Hentze – trumpet
- Davur Magnussen – trombone
- Annemarie McGahon – viola
- Fiona McLachlan – cello
- Tom Poulson – trumpet
- Joe Rattray – bass (upright), vocals
- Katie Rush – violin
- Fraser Russell – tuba
- Gordon Skene – guitar, vocals
- Tom Stearn – guitar
- Alex Trotter – trombone
