= Play It Again (TV series) =

British television series

- Genre: Reality TV
- Created by: Diverse Production
- Starring: Jo Brand; Frank Skinner; Aled Jones; Robert Winston; Diane Abbott; Bill Oddie
- Narrated by: Tamsin Greig
- Country of origin: United Kingdom
- Original language: English
- No. of episodes: 6

Production
- Running time: 60 mins

Original release
- Network: BBC 1
- Release: 25 March 2007

Play It Again is a documentary television series on BBC One, featuring celebrities trying to learn to play musical instruments. The series is produced by Diverse Production and started on 25 March 2007 and is narrated by Tamsin Greig. Play it Again premiered date

== Episodes ==
=== 1: Jo Brand, playing the organ. ===
Jo progresses in a series of steps starting with playing a piece for a church service, then she plays the Mighty Wurlitzer Organ the magnificent Blackpool Tower Ballroom, guided by resident organist, Phil Kelsall ("From Russia with Love") where she does not perform well, She also accompanies the "Ave Maria" for a wedding service before her ultimate challenge, which was to play Bach's "Toccata" in D minor in front of 8,000 people at the Royal Albert Hall. After a faltering start she managed to finish the piece with no further mistakes. Jo was given a tutor for regular lessons and also met up with Jools Holland for some tips on the Hammond organ. She began by thinking that she could practise in between all of her other commitments, but soon found that she had to devote much more time to rehearsing than she had expected.

=== 2: Frank Skinner, playing the banjo. ===
Frank began with tutor, Pete Stanley, he learned enough to play along with a Birmingham-based banjo group and to entertain some brummie pensioners although more with his wit than playing skills. He also took his banjo to the World Cup in Germany where he used it for one of his podcasts and also busked in Munich. Frank also joined Hayseed Dixie on stage at one of their gigs and played "Dueling Banjos" with them with modest success. He could not get along with his tutor and stopped seeing him before his final challenge, which was to enter a bluegrass competition in America. He met John Dowling, a previous winner of that competition, who took over teaching him. His entry was marred by nerves and he performed below expectations at the vital moment.

=== 3: Aled Jones, playing the drums. ===
Aled began with tutor Erik Stams an American drum teacher at Drumtech college in West London. Aled played Are You Gonna Go My Way by Lenny Kravitz as his exam piece before his first really hard test. Erik is a big fan of Led Zeppelin and so a Led Zeppelin tribute band was sought to provide Aled with his next challenge. Aled met up with Led Zep Too and got a masterclass in John Bonham style drumming from their drummer. He undertook to learn "Rock and Roll" and "Whole Lotta Love" however the latter was soon dropped as it was too hard. After only two proper rehearsals with the band he was introduced to a rowdy but appreciative audience in a music pub in Camden. He played slowly but well and the audience were won over by the fact that he could play at all. He was then being lined up to play with a major rock act for his final test but instead, after missing several lessons, he himself arranged to play with Chris de Burgh. Although this finale was in front of fifteen thousand people it was much less physically or technically demanding than his earlier performance and he managed to pull it off to everyone's satisfaction.

=== 6: Bill Oddie, playing the electric guitar. ===
Oddie attempts to realise his dream of becoming a rock guitarist. Initially teacher Bridget Mermikides tries to teach him using traditional methods but he rebels: instead he turns to old friends Albert Lee, Dave Davies and Mark Knopfler for advice and strikes out on his own. He succeeds in the target of playing lead guitar for his daughter Rosie's band at her 21st birthday party, and even manages to impress his erstwhile teacher.

== Events ==
Play It Again is also trying to get people interested in playing music. The BBC have organised several free events, between 21 April and 15 July 2007 around the UK. These events, directed by British composer Tim Steiner are open to any one and offer participants the chance to perform with one of the BBC orchestras and BBC Singers.

Members of the public can sign-up to play an instrument or, if not playing, to sing or to play a percussion instrument.

Each event lasts for a morning or afternoon and is based on an arrangement of Leonard Bernstein's West Side Story, specifically the number "Tonight", which is appropriately titled "Not Tonight". The musical score for 'Not Tonight' is split into 4 lines for each instrument part. These range in difficulty from 1 - easiest to 4 - hardest. The arrangement is deliberately aimed at being inclusive to accommodate a wide range of musical expertise from complete beginner so all of the public can take part. Each of the musical parts has a least one BBC Friend from the orchestra to help and guide their guests from the public.

In the first part of the event the public performers are treated to a mini-concert performance by the BBC Orchestra and Tim Steiner then uses the orchestra to illustrate the musical themes and the roles played by sections of the orchestra. At the end of the first section the public are split into their specific groups based on instrument, these being instrumental; saxophone; singer; percussion; others (generally guitar-like including electric, acoustic, classical but also anything of a similar family such as banjo or mandela).

In the second part of the event the individual sections are rehearsed separately. Those classified as "instrumental" rehearse with the BBC Orchestra. Lines 1 to 4 are rehearsed together with some improvisation at times. All of it is done with much humour on the part of Tim Steiner and everyone involved.

There is then a break for refreshments at which everyone gets the chance to compare notes with other members of the public and to find out about the instruments being brought in and the varying musical experience of others.

In the final part all the individually rehearsed sections of the super orchestra (which might be almost 300-strong with the 70-strong BBC orchestra) are brought together and rehearsed as a group. This culminates in a short public performance of the "Not Tonight" number.

The format of the individual parts of an event can be heard in the HUMS Aloud podcast under External links.

== Book ==
A book accompanying the series was released on 7 March 2007, by Chris Horrie.
