= Hatful of Rain =

Hatful of Rain may refer to:

- A Hatful of Rain, a 1957 film, or the play that it is based on
- Hatful of Rain (album), an album by Del Amitri
- Hatful of Rain (band), a folk/roots band based in East Sussex, England
