= BBC Radio 2 Young Folk Award =

Award for United Kingdom young folk musicians

- Awarded for: Folk music
- Sponsored by: BBC Radio 2
- Country: United Kingdom
- Formerly called: Young Tradition Award
- First award: 1998; 28 years ago
- Final award: 2019; 7 years ago
- Currently held by: Maddie Morris (2019)

Television/radio coverage
- Network: BBC Radio 2

The BBC Radio 2 Young Folk Award is an annual competition for young folk musicians in the United Kingdom. It was first awarded in 1988 as the Young Tradition Award, taking its present name in 1998. Recent winners of the award include Maddie Morris Brighde Chaimbeul, Talisk and Greg Russell & Ciaran Algar.

== Competition ==
The Young Tradition Award was a competition for young players of traditional music which was awarded annually between 1988 and 1996. BBC presenter Jim Lloyd wanted to get funding and publicity for young folk musicians in the same way that young classical musicians were helped by the BBC Young Musician award, and in 1988 he created the Young Tradition Award with a grant of £500 from the Ralph Vaughan Williams Trust. The title was a tribute to the 1960s folk group The Young Tradition.

The following year the award was adopted by the BBC programme Folk On 2 which Lloyd presented. Over the next six years, competitors included Carlene Anglim, Damien Barber, Pauline Cato, MacLaine Colston, Luke Daniels, Ingrid Henderson and Catriona MacDonald. In 1994 Lloyd wrote that the Award had been expanded to include traditional singers as well as instrumentalists, restricted to professional or semi-professional artists, and associated with a bursary of £1,000. Lloyd retired from the BBC at the end of 1997, and a Young Tradition big band including all the previous winners performed on his final Folk On 2 programme.

The BBC recreated an award from 1998, calling it the BBC Radio 2 Young Folk Award. Until 2005, the competition was run by Folkworks on behalf of the BBC. The entry criteria in 2005 were that the event was "open to anyone aged between fifteen and twenty, performing as a band, duo or soloist and performing traditional and acoustic music with roots in any culture", and these criteria have remained largely unchanged in subsequent years. The short-listed finalists are invited to a residential weekend, as part of which they will perform in a public concert at which the winner is chosen by a judging panel.

Since 2011 the winner of the Young Folk Award has been announced at the main BBC Radio 2 Folk Awards, which are broadcast on BBC Radio 2 with some highlights also televised. However the selection process for the Young Folk Award remains independent.

== Young Folk Award finalists (1998–present) ==
2019
Maddie Morris
The selection process changed again for the 2019 award. There were eight shortlisted acts, but only the winner was officially announced. Some of the finalists have identified themselves, including Jon Doran.

2018

- Mera Royle
- Jack Warnock
- Josiah & Ludwig
- The Drystones

2017

- Josie Duncan & Pablo Lafuente
- Amelia Coburn
- Charlie Grey & Joseph Peach
- Eryn Rae

2016

- Brighde Chaimbeul
- Causeway Trio
- Jack Cookson
- Benammi Swift

2015

- Talisk
- Cup O'Joe
- Roseanne Reid
- Wildwood Kin

2014

- The Mischa Macpherson Trio
- Hattie Briggs
- Gentlemen of Few
- Granny's Attic

2013

- Greg Russell & Ciaran Algar
- Luke Jackson
- Graham Mackenzie & Ciorstaidh Beaton
- Thalla

2012

- Ioscaid
- Sunjay Brayne
- Blair Dunlop
- Graham Mackenzie

2011

- Moore Moss Rutter
- Adam Holmes
- David Gibb & Elly Lucas
- Mairi & Steaphanaidh Chaimbeul

The number of finalists was reduced from six to four this year.

2010

- James Findlay
- The Carrivick Sisters
- Chris Keatinge
- Cinnte
- Mairi and Steaphanaidh (Chaimbeul)
- Niamh Boadle

2009

- Joe and Megan Henwood
- Jaywalkers
- Emily Hoile and Alice Burn
- Tyde
- Maz O'Connor
- Lucy Ward

2008

- Jeana Leslie & Siobhan Miller
- Dogan Mehmet
- Ryan Young
- One String Loose
- Emily Hoile
- Jack McNeil & Charlie Heys

2007

- Last Orders
- Ewen & Megan Henderson
- David Delarre
- Ryan Young
- Ruth Notman & Bryony Bainbridge
- Wilbur

2006

- Bodega
- Southwind
- Joe O'Connor
- Shona Donaldson
- James Chadwick
- Matheu Watson

2004/5

- Lauren MacColl
- Chillum
- Kathryn Davidson
- Kerfuffle
- Bella Hardy
- Carly Blain and Rachel Cross

2003

- Jarlath Henderson
- Tom Kitching
- XYZ
- Jackie Oates
- Emma Sweeney
- Arlen

2002

- Uiscedwr
- Trad Óg
- Míse
- KTB (Katy Barnett)
- Sarah Hayes and Ian Stephenson
- Shona Kipling

2001

- GiveWay
- Celtica
- Siobhan Miller
- Peter Tickell
- Jim Moray
- Sarah Hayes

2000

- Black Cat Theory
- Gjenya Cambray
- Sarah Hayes
- Ola
- Phamie Gow
- Frame, McKerrell, Napier

1999
422

1998
Tim Van Eyken

== Young Tradition Award finalists (1988–1996) ==
Information about the nominees in the earlier years is scarce.

1996

- Jennifer Wrigley
- Nancy Kerr
- Luke Daniels (musician)
- Damien Barber
- Ingrid Henderson
- Dezi Donnelly

1995

- Michael McGoldrick
- Oliver Bootle
- Ben Dauncey
- Corrina Hewat

1994
Kathryn Roberts

1993
Carlene Anglim

1992
Luke Daniels (musician)

1991
Catriona MacDonald
Finalists this years included Saul Rose.

1990
Ingrid Henderson

1989
Simon Thoumire
Thoumire notes that the finalists included Becky Taylor, and Coxon's article quotes her. Damien Barber was also a finalist.

1988
Lynn Tocker
Thoumire relates that he met duo partner Ian Carr among the finalists of the first competition, and Coxson's article quotes Andy Cutting on his participation.

== See also ==
- BBC Radio 2 Folk Awards
- BBC Radio Scotland Young Traditional Musician
