= Shennaghys Jiu =

Manx youth music and performing arts festival

- Logo for Shennaghys Jiu
- Genre: Youth, performing arts
- Frequency: Mostly annually, with some fallow years.
- Locations: Ramsey, Peel
- Country: Isle of Man
- Years active: 27–28 years
- Inaugurated: April 1998
- Most recent: 5 April 2019 – 8 April 2019
- Website: https://shennaghysjiu.com/

Shennaghys Jiu (English: Tradition Today) is a four-day youth music and performing arts festival on the Isle of Man. The festival's aim is to give young performers of traditional Manx music and dance the opportunity to come together in a non-competitive environment, and share culture with the other Celtic nations.

== History ==
Although the Isle of Man has a long history of Gaelic music, much of it was only recorded in the 19th century when the Island became a destination for mass tourism and knowledge of traditional music began to diminish. After a long period of decline, punctuated by the work of collectors such as Dr John Clague and Mona Douglas, Manx traditional music saw a resurgence in the 1970s and Manx music and dance is taught in all the schools on the Island. Popular interest has developed into music festivals such as Shennaghys Jiu and Cooish, and groups like Bree and Scran.

Shennaghys Jiu was founded in 1998 by Manx musicians James Alexander, Juan Garrett and Andrew Hannan. Their objective was to give young people the experience of participating in informal sessions and of performing traditional music on stage without the pressure of competition. The first festival was in Ramsey in April of the same year and there has been a connection to the town since.

Along with other Manx festivals such as Manx LitFest and Yn Chruinnaght, the contribution of Shennaghys Jiu to Manx culture has been celebrated with a commemorative stamp from the Isle of Man Post Office in 2017.

The 2020 festival was cancelled due to the COVID-19 pandemic restrictions on the Isle of Man.

== Performances ==
Shennaghys Jiu has a wide variety of performers and acts as part of the festival. Traditional Manx music and dance are prominent features of the festival, but since it was founded in 1998, the festival has grown to include acts from all Celtic nations, and Galicia.

As Shennaghys Jiu is a festival for young people, there is a large emphasis on the participation of students from local primary and secondary schools to perform at the festival.

There are also language, dance, and instrument workshops available throughout the festival. Evening pub sessions are also an important part of the festival, as it introduces young people to the informal environment of traditional music sessions. Organiser Juan Garrett has described the successes of the festival as being "encouraging to see so many children playing and dancing, and people attending and getting involved in both the festival and in Manx culture."

Although most of the acts perform in Ramsey in the north of the Island, there are often performances in Peel, on the west of the Island.
