= Helen Bell =

English singer-songwriter, composer, and multi-instrumentalist

Helen Bell is an English singer-songwriter, composer, and multi-instrumentalist, specialising in viola.

While studying music at the University of York between 1999 and 2001 she became part of the trio Ola with Sarah Wright (bodhran, flute, vocals) and Michael Jary (concertina). The trio went on to become finalists in the BBC Radio 2 Young Folk Award in 2000, and released two albums, The Animals are in the West and Be Prepared for Weather.

In 2000, she released her first instrumental solo album, Audierne, on which she was accompanied by guitarist Ed Pritchard. In 2005, Bell began working with Tom Drinkwater as one half of the duo Pillowfish, who released the album Common Knowledge in 2006.

Bell was interviewed as part of Dr. Lindsay Aitkenhead's 2006 thesis on folk viola players. Her song "Broken Town" was covered by English fiddle-singer Jackie Oates on her self-titled debut album in 2006.

She released Roll as a Hexagon, her first album of original songs, in 2018. This was followed by a series of EPs that were subsequently reworked to form her second album, Five Thousand Feathers.

== Discography ==
Helen Bell with Ed Pritchard

- Audierne (2000) (Little Acorn)

Ola

- The Animals are in the West (2001) (Green Fingers Music)
- Be Prepared for Weather (2003)

Pillowfish

- Common Knowledge (2006) (Pillowfish)

Tamarysk

- Eighteen Degrees of Indigo (2016)

Helen Bell

- Roll as a Hexagon (2018)
- Five Thousand Feathers (2024)
