= Sanjay =

'Sanjay, also spelled Sanjai, Sanjey, Sanje, and Sunjay, is a male given name of Sanskrit origin meaning "triumphant," from the Sanskrit Sañjaya (सञ्जय), and may refer to:

== People ==
- Sanjaya, an important character in the ancient Indian epic Mahabharata
- Sanjay Gupta (born 1969), a neurosurgeon and CNN senior medical correspondent
- Sanjay Manjrekar (born 1965), a former Indian cricketer
- Sanjay Malhotra, an Indian civil servant
- Sanjay Goyal, an Indian civil servant

=== Actor ===
- Sanjay Dutt (born 1959), an Indian actor
- Sanjay Shejwal, an Indian actor
- Sanjay Kapoor, an Indian actor and producer, and brother of Anil Kapoor
- Sanjay Khan (born 1941), an Indian actor, director and producer
- Sanjay Mitra (actor), an Indian actor in Malayalam cinema and television
- Sanjaya Malakar (born 1989), American singer and finalist on the sixth season of American Idol
- Sanjay Suri (born 1971), an Indian actor and producer

=== Cinema ===
- Sanjay Leela Bhansali (born 1963), an Indian film director
- Sanjay Mehrotra, CEO of Micron Technology and co-founder of Sandisk.
- Sanjay Patel, a British American animator

=== Musician ===
- Sanjay Subrahmanyan (born 1968), a Carnatic vocalist from India
- Sunjay (born 1993), British singer-songwriter

=== Politician ===
- Sanjay Awasthy Politician and MLA from Arki, Himachal Pradesh, India
- Sanjay Bansode (born 1973), an Indian politician and minister in government of Maharashtra
- Sanjay Gaikwad, member of the Maharashtra Legislative Assembly
- Sanjay Gandhi (1946–1980), an Indian politician and son of former prime minister of India Indira Gandhi
- Sanjaya Sinh (born 1951), an Indian politician from the state of Uttar Pradesh

== Fictional characters ==
- Sanjay Nahasapeemapetilon, the younger brother of Apu in the American animated sitcom The Simpsons
- Sanjay, an Indian American character on the American animated series The Fairly OddParents
- Prince Sanjay of Ishkebar, a character in the American sitcom The Suite Life of Zack & Cody
- Sanjay Dravid, an Indian scientist in the Power of Five novel series
- Sanjay Patel, a main character in the 2013 American animated series Sanjay and Craig
- Sanjay Patel, a character in the American sitcom Modern Family
- Sanjay Rash, a Separatist puppet ruler in the fifth season of Star Wars: The Clone Wars

== See also ==
- Sanjaya (disambiguation)
