= Bree (Manx youth movement) =

Manx traditional youth music and dance movement

- English: Vitality
- Logo for Bree
- Formation: 2006
- Type: Cultural movement, youth movement
- Purpose: Promotion of traditional Manx music and dance.
- Region served: Isle of Man
- Key people: Dr. Chloë Woolley
- Parent organization: Culture Vannin
- Website: Manx Music

Bree is a youth educational movement organised by Culture Vannin on the Isle of Man that gives children between the ages 10 and 18 the opportunity to learn traditional Manx music, dance, and culture. Bree is a Manx word that means 'vitality or 'energy'. The movement organises the annual workshop weekend every autumn and also runs monthly sessions through the year.

== History ==
Although the Isle of Man has a long history of Gaelic music, much of it was only recorded in the 19th century when the Island became a destination for mass tourism and knowledge of traditional music began to diminish. After a long period of decline, punctuated by the work of collectors such as Dr John Clague and Mona Douglas, Manx traditional music saw a resurgence in the 1960s and Manx music and dance is taught in all the schools on the Island. Popular interest has developed into groups like Bree and music festivals such as Shennaghys Jiu and Cooish.

Founded in 2006 by Culture Vannin, the movement's objective is to introduce and develop Manx culture for the Island's young musicians and dancers and to ensure that it remains part of a living tradition. Bree was modelled on the Scottish Feis movement which aims to develop skills in the Gaelic arts for young people.

== Workshop weekend ==
Every October, Bree organises a weekend workshop where young people can opt to take workshops in playing or singing, drama, composing and song-writing in English or Manx. They are guided by experienced local Manx musicians in learning new skills. At the end of the weekend, there is a final concert for parents on the Sunday afternoon where all the students participate.

== Other work ==
Monthly music sessions for young people are organised by Bree in Douglas and St John's. This is an informal session that allows young people to improve their skills and become comfortable with musical performance. Bree also competes in the annual Manx Folk Awards, and performs at community and charitable events throughout the Island.

Scran is a Manx traditional music group that has grown out of Bree. It consists of young people from the ages 13 to 18 and performs in both English and Manx. Harpist Mera Royle, who won the BBC Radio 2's Young Folk Award in 2018, is a former member of Bree and member of Scran.

Bree released Bree Session Tunes which is a collection of over 80 Manx tunes with chords and counter-melodies. It is primarily based on Bree session tunes that were arranged for young people. It aims to give young people the resources to practice and learn sessions tunes by themselves or with friends.
