= Moore Moss Rutter =

- Origin: Norfolk/Somerset/Yorkshire
- Genres: Contemporary Folk, English Folk, Acoustic Art Music
- Years active: 2009–present
- Members: Tom Moore; Archie Churchill-Moss; Jack Rutter
- Website: mooremossrutter.co.uk

Moore Moss Rutter is a contemporary folk music trio formed in the UK in 2009. The group consists of Tom Moore (violin), Archie Churchill-Moss (Melodeon), and Jack Rutter (guitar/vocals). Their material is often developed from traditional English folk tunes and pieces of their own composition, which are heavily arranged. They incorporate folk music, 20th-century classical music, jazz, and elements of bluegrass.

== Awards and airplay ==
They were winners of the 2011 BBC Radio 2 Young Folk Award, given during the BBC Radio 2 Folk Awards. Tracks from their 2011 self-titled album 'Moore Moss Rutter' and live tracks recorded especially for BBC Radio 2 have had radio airplay. They have also filmed a live set for Sky Arts, which was recorded backstage at the Cambridge Folk Festival. The trio also featured in BBC Four's 2012 documentary, 'Fairport Convention: Who Knows Where the Time Goes?', narrated by Frank Skinner.
