= Sanjaya (disambiguation) =

Sanjaya is the character from the epic Mahabharata.

Sanjaya may also refer to:

- Sanjaya Mahākosala, father of King Pasenadi of Kosala in ancient India
- Sanjaya dynasty, the Javanese dynasty
  - Sanjaya of Mataram, the founder of the Mataram kingdom
- Sanjaya Lall, Indian economist
- Sanjaya Malakar, Indian-American singer, American Idol contestant
- Sanjaya Belatthaputta, an ascetic teacher in ancient India

== See also ==
- Sanjay (disambiguation)
