= Mise (band) =

Traditional Irish band

Míse is a London-based traditional Irish music band, composed of six young musicians, featuring a wide range of instruments. The group was formed in County Kerry, Ireland. In 2002, they were finalists for the prestigious BBC Radio 2 Young Folk Award.

== Band members ==
Liam O'sullivan - Accordion

Matt Griffin - Banjo, Mandolin, Guitar, Whistles

Tim Dowd - Uilleann Pipes, Flute, Whistles

Daniel Griffin - Bodhrán

Liam Stapleton - Flute, Whistles

Anthony Davis - Keyboards

== Debut album ==
Míse released their debut album Firefly to critical acclaim.

Track Listing:

1. Hooves In The Rock

2. Missing Key

3. Chonaiomar

4. Herschel

5. Firefly

6. Spanish Point

7. One. Two.. Three

8. Busker's Waltz

9. Wee Duck

10. Wibblies

11. Tico Tico

12. Classical

13. That's Stuff
