= Admiral Fallow =

Scottish indie folk band

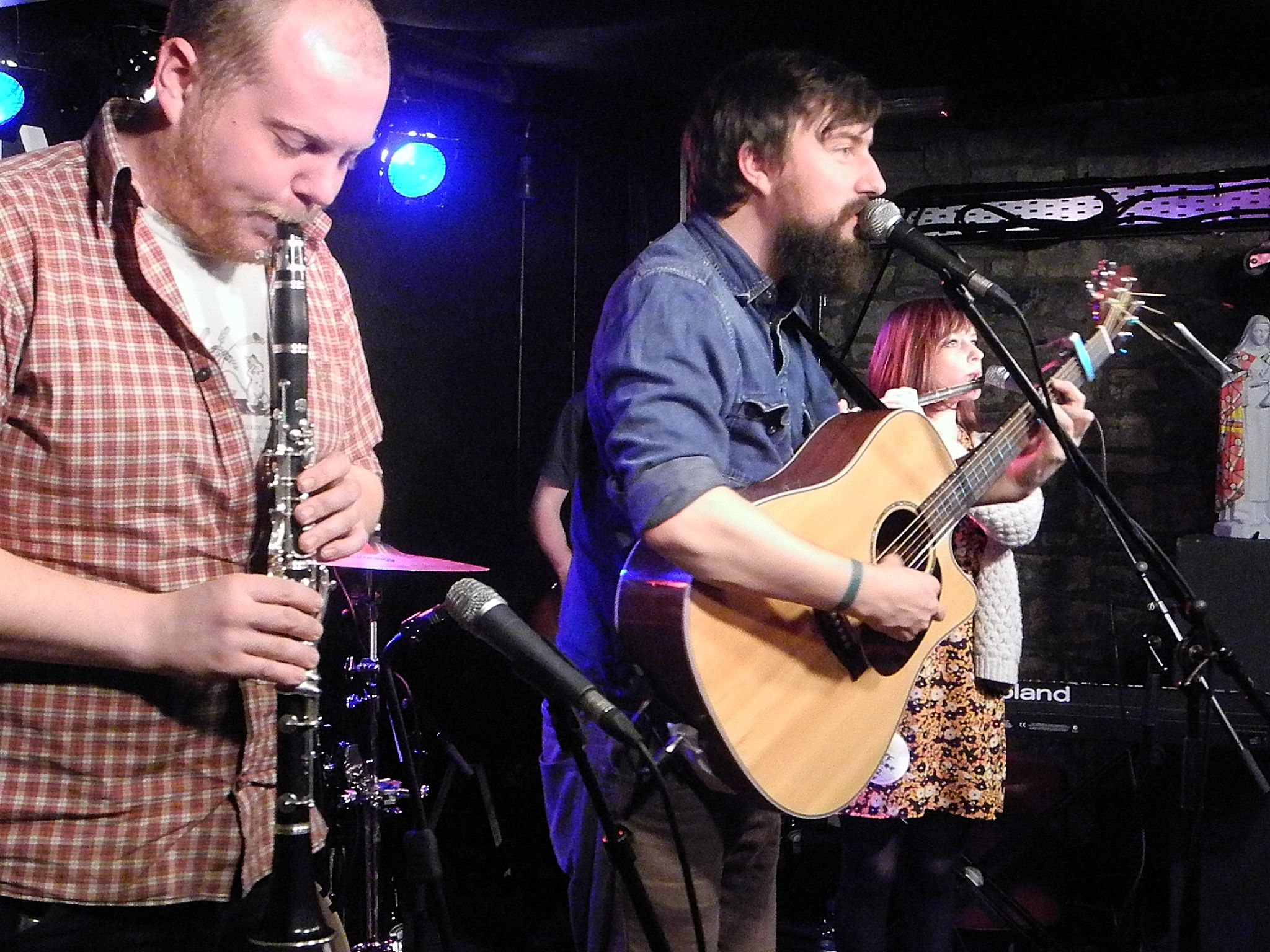
- Admiral Fallow performing at Academy 2, Dublin in October 2011

Background information
- Origin: Glasgow, Scotland
- Genres: Indie folk
- Years active: 2007–present
- Labels: Lo-Five, Euphonios, Indigo, Nettwerk
- Members: Louis Abbott; Kevin Brolly; Philip Hague; Sarah Hayes; Joseph Rattray; Stuart Goodall
- Website: www.admiralfallow.com

Admiral Fallow are a Scottish musical group formed in 2007 by singer-songwriter Louis Abbott and based in Glasgow. They were originally named Brother Louis Collective. The band's first album, Boots Met My Face, was released worldwide in 2011. Their song "Squealing Pigs" was used on NBC's Chuck and was performed live on the BBC's Hogmanay Live 2011.

== Albums ==
=== Boots Met My Face ===
Boots Met My Face was recorded in July 2009 and produced at the Glasgow studio Chem 19 by engineer Paul Savage (former Delgados drummer and winner of the 2010 UK Producers' Guild "Breakthrough Producer of the Year" award). The album recording was partially funded by Creative Scotland.

Lead singer and main writer Louis Abbott has said that "All of the songs document the first chapter of my life, be it memories from school or kicking a ball about with my childhood chums. All are taken from real life events. There's no fiction. I'm not into making up stories or characters for the sake of trying to stir emotions. They are songs about friends and family as well as a fair bit of self-evaluation".

The album title comes from a line in "Subbuteo" which references an incident when Abbott was beaten up at the age of 15 in his home town of Edinburgh.

"Squealing Pigs" was first released as a single in the UK released in April 2010 by Lo-Five Records, followed by Boots Met My Face in April 2010, re-released in March and June 2011. The release garnered album of the week praise in the Daily Record, The List and was named the Best Album of 2010 by Scottish music website "The Pop Cop". In addition, Linn Records made the album available as one of their famed 24-bit Studio Master Downloads, calling it the "Record of the Week" for 19 July. Boots Met My Face was later released in Germany by Indigo Records on 13 August 2010. Another single, "Subbuteo" (backed with an alternate version of "Delivered"), was released in October 2010.

=== Tree Bursts in Snow ===
Tree Bursts in Snow was released on 21 May 2012. The first 500 preorders were signed by the band in Reading at their distributors on 14 May. Frontman and principal songwriter Louis Abbott explained the meaning of the title:

The title refers to the sound and the image of an artillery shell exploding into a cluster of snow-drenched trees... I'm also astounded by the sheer volume of gun related violent crimes throughout the world but in particular in the U.S. The lyric from 'Tree Bursts' was inspired by the idea of the effect that losing friends through violence, in particular during times of war or conflict has on young men and women. They are "the leaves that fall louder than backfire, all orange and halloween red".

Another music video was released on 24 July for "Guest of the Government" along with information regarding its release as a single with a new b-side called "Concrete Oaths". "Concrete Oaths" was previously released in 2010 on an album entitled Glad Cafe.

A third music video was released on 8 November 2012 for "Isn't This World Enough??". It includes footage of Admiral Fallow on tour around the UK and USA. The single was released on 10 December 2012.

=== Tiny Rewards ===
Tiny Rewards, Admiral Fallow's third studio album, was released on 25 May 2015.

== Touring ==
In July 2009 the band headlined the Sunday night T Break stage at T in the Park. They also played the BBC Introducing Stage the following year.

The band expanded the number of live shows, playing with King Creosote at the Fence Collective's Homegame Festival in March, touring the UK in the first 2 weeks of April 2010 and supporting the Futureheads in Glasgow in late April. Summer festivals included opening for King Creosote at the Glasgow West End Festival and playing the Wee Chill, Rockness and Insider festivals.

They have also played at the Wee Chill, Rockness, Loopallu Festival and Insider festivals, In July 2012 the band played and headlined Spey Fest in the moray town of Fochabers. The band has supported many artists – including Guillemots, King Creosote, the Futureheads, Paolo Nutini, Frightened Rabbit, Belle and Sebastian, The Low Anthem. In 2011 the band played a UK headline tour and also attended Austin, Texas for SxSW 2011. Shows followed in New York City. UK summer 2011 festivals included Glastonbury, Latitude, Cambridge Folk Festival, Green Man, and End of the Road. They co-headlined the HMV Next Big Thing Festival 2012.

Summer 2010 festivals were followed by an August Scottish tour culminating in a show in Paisley with Paolo Nutini. Late 2010 was taken up by a UK and Ireland tour opening for the band's friends and fellow Scots, Frightened Rabbit, culminating in 2 sold out shows at Glasgow's Barrowland Ballroom.

2011 brought a February/March UK headline tour in support of the re-issue of their self-released album, Boots Met My Face. On 13 March the band flew to Austin, Texas for SxSW 2011. Heralded as one to watch by NPR's "All Songs Considered" the band performed at Showcases with Mr Heavenly and Dry The River, causing Paste magazine to judge Admiral Fallow as their "7th favorite band at SxSW 2011." Headline shows followed in The Mercury Lounge, Manhattan, The Way Station, Brooklyn plus sold out gigs at The Full Steam Brewery, Durham, NC and The Lizard Lounge, Cambridge Mass. On 5 July 2011, Admiral Fallow were featured on the BBC 2 documentary Scotland Rocks at South By Southwest which saw them performing "Squealing Pigs" at The Caritas soup kitchen for the homeless in Austin, Texas.

UK summer 2011 festivals followed (including The Great Escape, Glastonbury, Latitude, Cambridge Folk Festival, Green Man, End of the Road) with overseas trips to Sligo Live and Crossing Border. Through the summer the band has also opened for bands as diverse as Belle and Sebastian, Paul Heaton and The Low Anthem.

In January 2012 the band had a (6 shows in 7 days) sold out tour of their home town, Glasgow, during Celtic Connections 2012. This included a slot opening for Snow Patrol. One of their highlights was a gig at the O2 ABC on 27 January, prompting The Shetland Times to rate an enthusiastic review; "There are very few occasions when one is lucky enough to be present when a band takes the step into the big league. Friday night was one of these." On 2 February, the band finished off a gigging period with a Daytrotter session and a sold out London Borderline gig on a co-headline with We Are Augustines, as the opening gig of the HMV Next Big Thing Festival. As well as an album release the band had a lengthy UK tour in April and May to help promote sales of Tree Bursts in the Snow. They headlined the Sunday night at the Introducing Stage at TITP 2012, and also appeared before The Proclaimers at Hebfest.

In 2013, they played at the Perth Festival with The Hazey Janes. The Herald commented that "Admiral Fallow must be among the favourites for this year's Scottish Album of the Year (Say) award with the sublime Tree Bursts In Snow, but are doing relatively few live shows this year in order to write the follow-up."

== Band members ==
Admiral Fallow's line-up (2007–present)	Louis Abbott – vocals, guitars; Kevin Brolly – clarinet, keyboards, vocals, percussion; Philip Hague – drums, percussion, vocals; Sarah Hayes – flute, piano, accordion, vocals; Joe Rattray – bass, vocals

== Discography ==
=== Albums ===
- Boots Met My Face (2010) (reissued in 2011)
- Tree Bursts in Snow (2012)
- Tiny Rewards (2015)
- The Idea of You (2021)
- First of the Birds (2025)

=== Singles ===
Euphonios

- "These Barren Years" (different version from album) b/w "Gypsy Girl" (March 2009) (available via www.admiralfallow.com) (As Brother Louis Collective)

Lo-Five

- "Squealing Pigs" (April 2010)
- "These Barren Years" (album version) (July 2010)
- "Subbuteo" (October 2010)
- "Squealing Pigs" (February 2012, USA only)

Nettwerk

- "Beetle in the Box" b/w "Party Fears Two" (March 2012) (Limited Edition White Label 7" Vinyl)
- "Guest of the Government" b/w "Concrete Oaths" (September 2012)
- "Isn't This World Enough??" (December 2012)

=== Compilations ===
- "Concrete Oaths" appears on The Glad Cafe Album (October 2010) (45 A Side Records)
- "Torrent Rain" appears on For Folk's Sake It's Christmas 2012 (December 2012)

== See also ==
- List of bands from Glasgow
- List of Scottish musicians
