= Luke Daniels (musician) =

British folk musician

- Genres: Folk music
- Occupations: Singer-songwriter; Multi-instrumentalist
- Instruments: Vocals, melodeon, accordion, guitar, piano
- Years active: 1990s–present
- Website: lukedanielsmusic.com

Luke Daniels is an English multi-instrumentalist, singer, and composer who grew up in Sonning Common, South Oxfordshire. Daniels grew up playing the melodeon in the Irish tradition and gained early recognition after winning the BBC Radio 2 Young Folk Award in 1992.

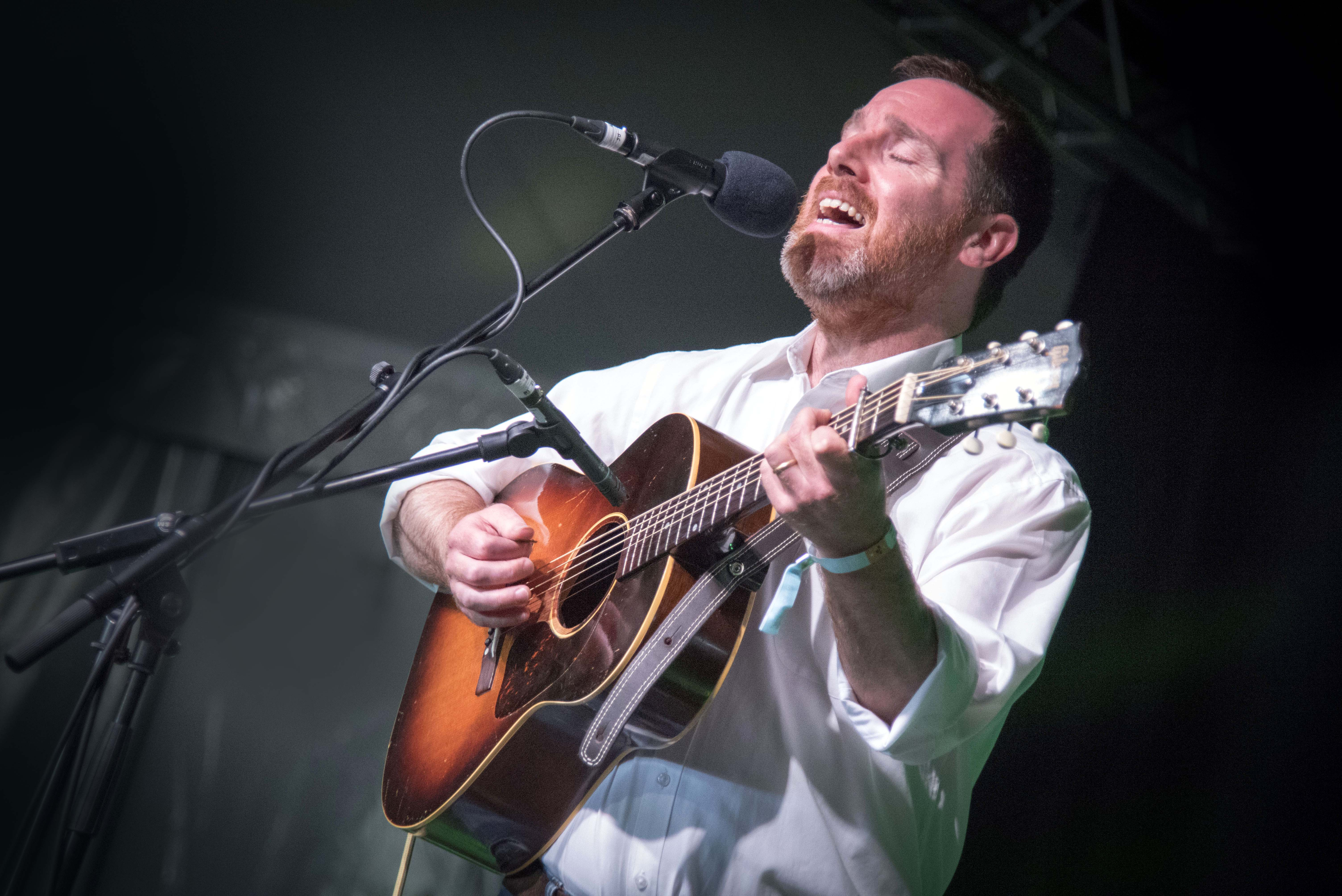
Luke Daniels, Underneath the Stars Festival, Cannon Hall Farm, Cawthorne

== Career ==
He has performed with a variety of artists including Ian Anderson of Jethro Tull and De Dannan, and worked for Riverdance.

Daniels is a multi-instrumentalist singer and composer who plays guitar, piano, accordion, and melodeon. He has toured with the Cara Dillon band, worked with Syrian oud player Rihab Azar, and collaborated with English folk musician Nancy Kerr.

== Polyphon project ==
In 2016, Daniels restored a 19th-century Polyphon music machine, composed new works for it, and performed live with it. He integrated MIDI, foot pedals, and modern triggers into the mechanism, creating hybrid compositions featured on his album Revolve and Rotate.

== Teaching and mentorship ==
Daniels is a tutor in traditional music at the Royal Conservatoire of Scotland and has served as the Folk Musician in Residence at the Scottish National Museum of Rural Life.

== Media and broadcasting ==
He has performed on BBC Radio 3’s In Tune and had compositions broadcast as part of the PRS Foundation’s New Music Biennial. Daniels has also performed on major film soundtracks, including sessions with the London Philharmonic Orchestra on The Lord of the Rings and The Hobbit.

=== Discography ===
- Tarantella
- Above the Bellow (Luke Daniels and Jonathan Preiss)
- Secret Sessions
- Lost Music of the Gaels
- Art of Trio
- The Mighty Box (2011)
- Mother Glasgow
- What’s Here What’s Gone (2014)
- Tribute to William Hannah
- Revolve and Rotate
- Making Waves (2017)
- Singing Ways to Feel More Junior (2017)
- Old Friends and Exhausted Enemies (2019)
- Luke Daniels and the Cobhers (2022)
