= Greg Russell and Ciaran Algar =

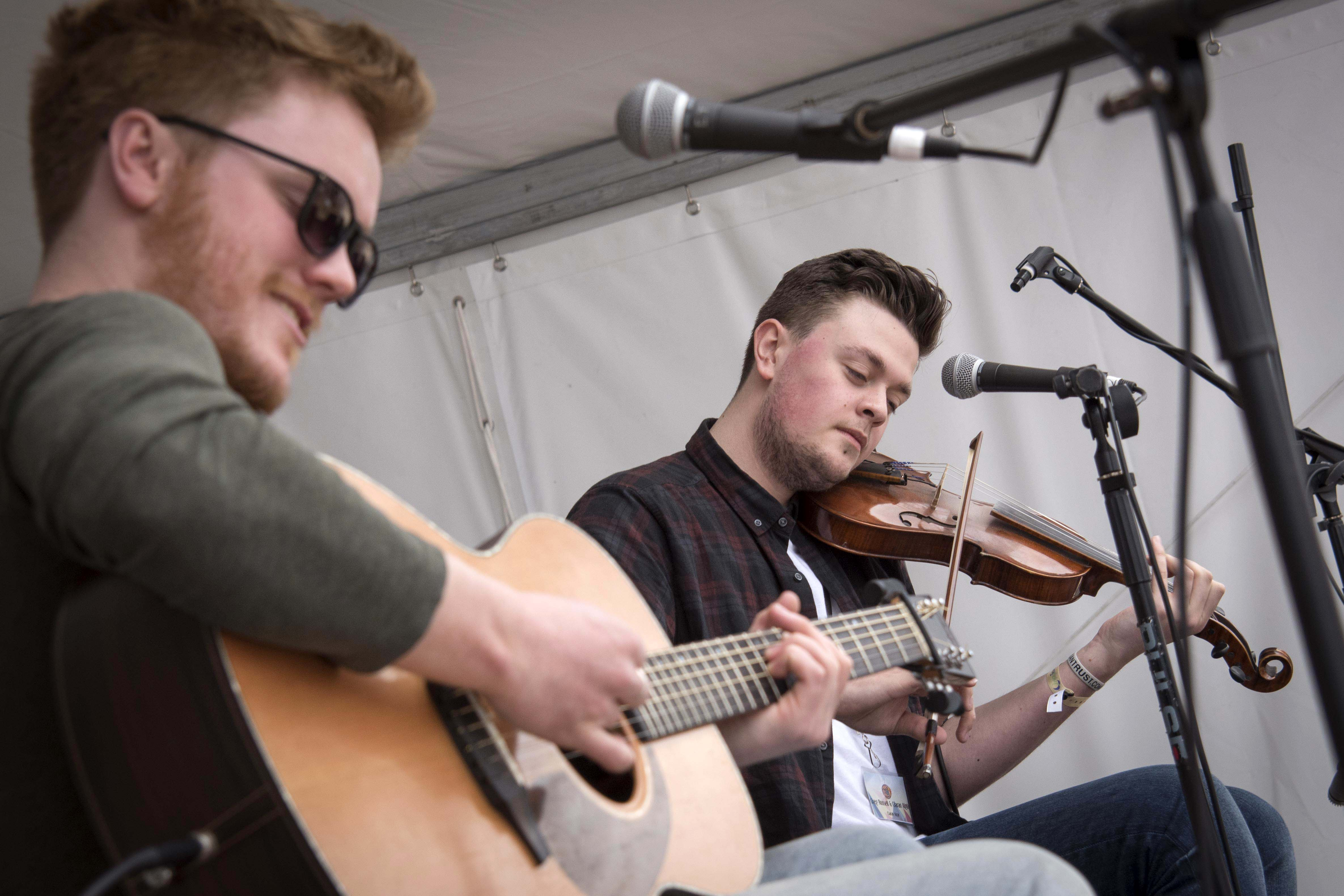

Background information
- Genres: Folk
- Instrument(s): vocals, guitar, fiddle, bouzouki
- Years active: 2011–present
- Members: Greg Russell; Ciaran Algar
- Website: russellalgar.co.uk

Greg Russell and Ciaran Algar are a British folk music duo. Algar is a multi-instrumentalist who plays fiddle, guitar, banjo, and percussion. They won the BBC Radio 2 Young Folk Award in 2013, and in 2014 won the Horizon award in the BBC Radio 2 Folk Awards. They were nominated for the Best Duo award in 2015.

As well as working as the duo, Russell and Algar have been involved in other projects. Russell put together Shake the Chains, a project which brought together musicians including Nancy Kerr, Martin Simpson and Peggy Seeger to write and sing songs of togetherness, protest and community. Russell was also involved in a revival of Peter Bellamy's folk ballad opera The Transports. Algar is also a member of Sam Kelly and The Lost Boys. Russell joined The Band of Love, who released their debut album Folk Fever in 2018.

== Albums ==
- The Queen's Lover (2012)
- The Call (2014)
- The Silent Majority (2016)
- Utopia and Wasteland (2018)
