= Mera Royle =

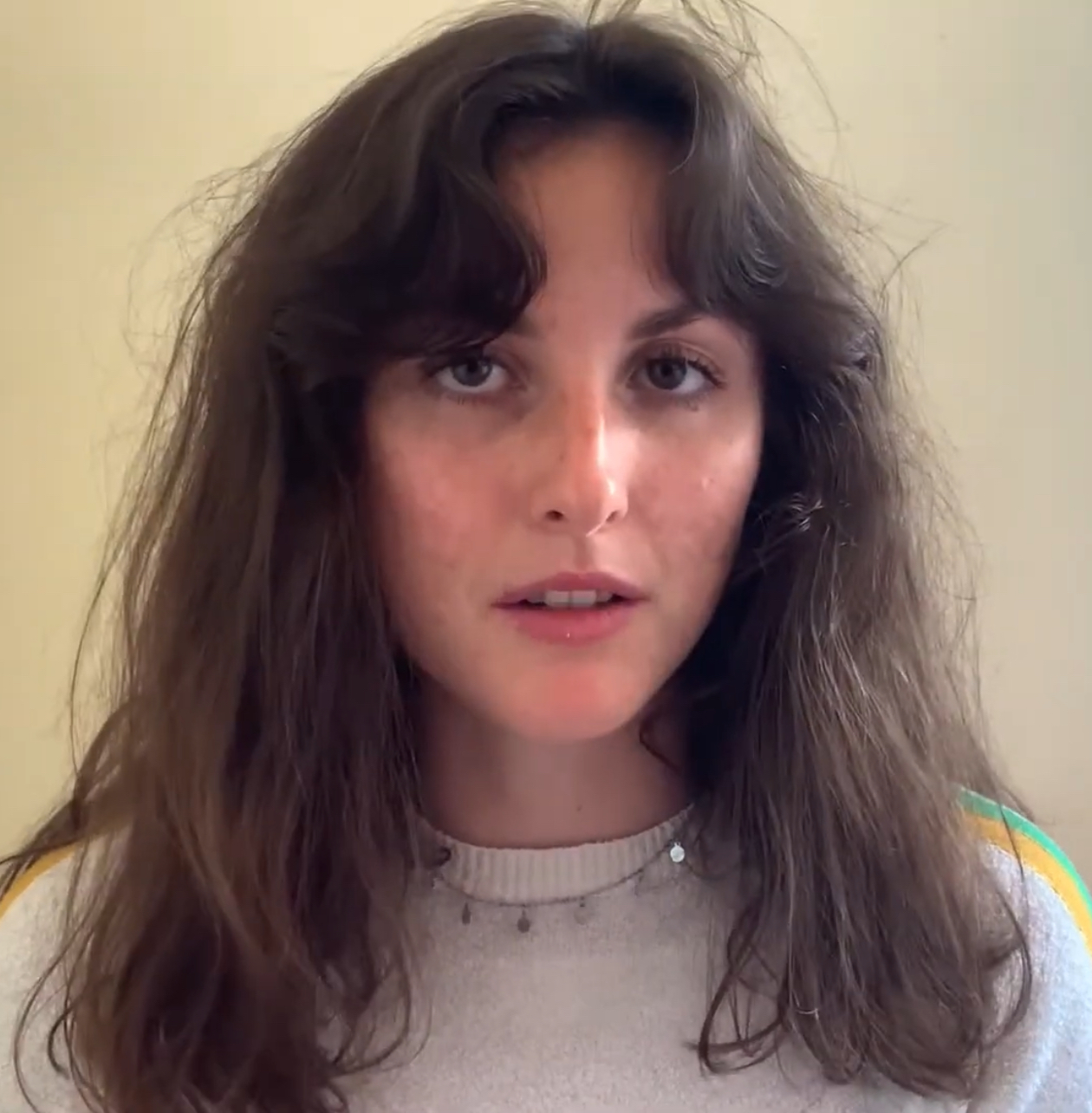
- Royle in 2021

Background information
- Born: Mera Teresa Royle; 9 December 1999 (age 26); Tameside, Greater Manchester, England
- Genres: Folk
- Instruments: Harp; violin
- Member of: Scran

Mera Teresa Royle (born 9 December 1999) is a harpist, violinist and composer from the Isle of Man. She won the 2018 BBC Radio 2 Young Folk Award.

== Biography ==
Royle was born in Greater Manchester and moved to the Isle of Man as a toddler, where she grew up in Maughold. Royle attended Scoill Ree Gorree and completed her A Levels at Ramsey Grammar School. She graduated from Newcastle University.

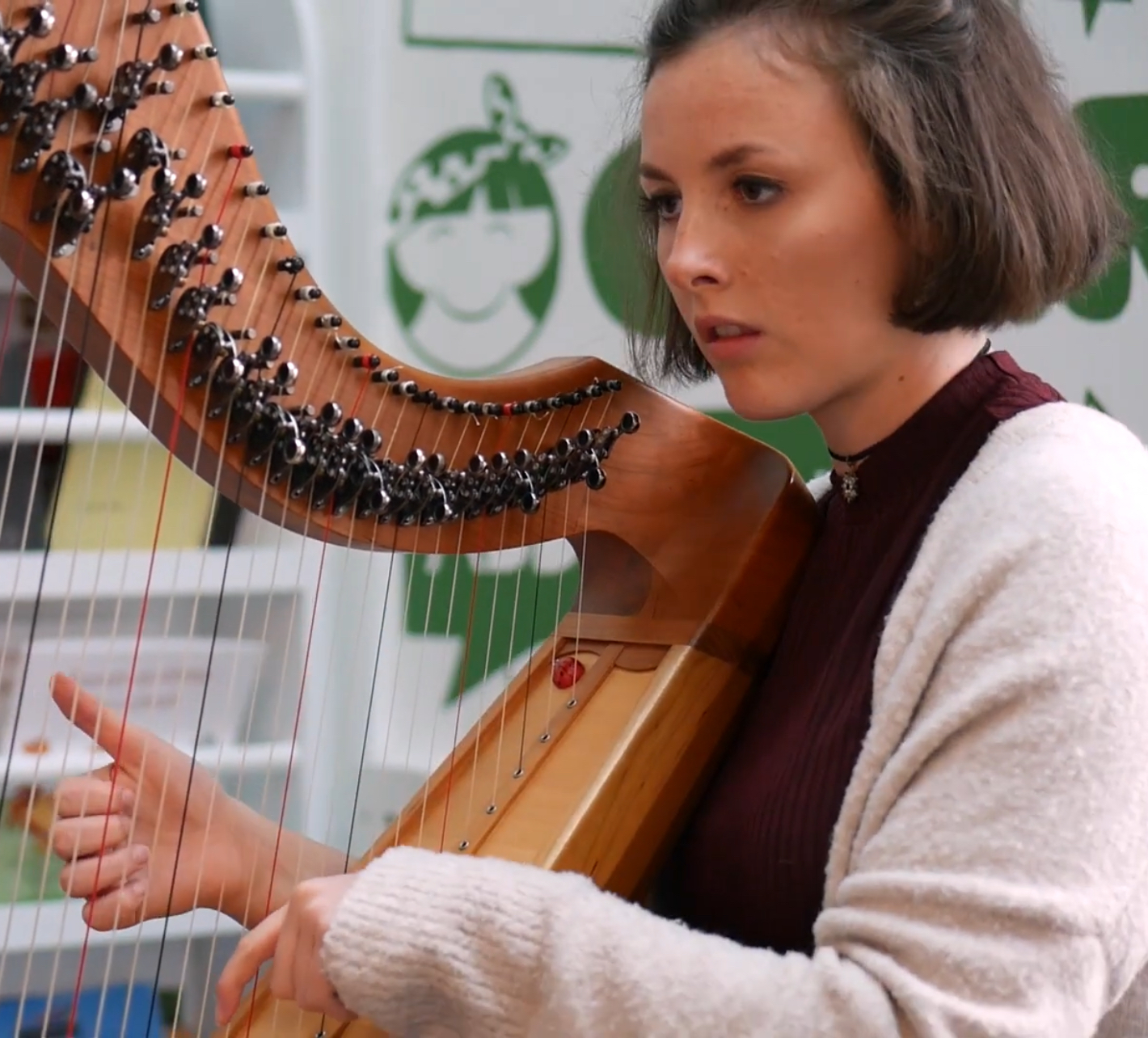
Royle in 2017

Royle learned violin at the age of 8 and was encouraged to take up harp by her teacher Mike Boulton. She began playing with the youth folk music project Bree, out of which formed the teen folk group Scran. She received lessons from Scottish harpist Rachel Hair.

In 2018, Royle won the Young Folk Award at the BBC Radio 2 Folk Awards and released her debut EP The Ballaglass Set, named after Ballaglass Glen. The EP features contributions from Ruth Keggin, Raygie Dolloso and Owen Williams. With the latter two, Royle performed at the Cambridge Folk Festival, Towersey Festival and Fairport's Cropredy Convention.

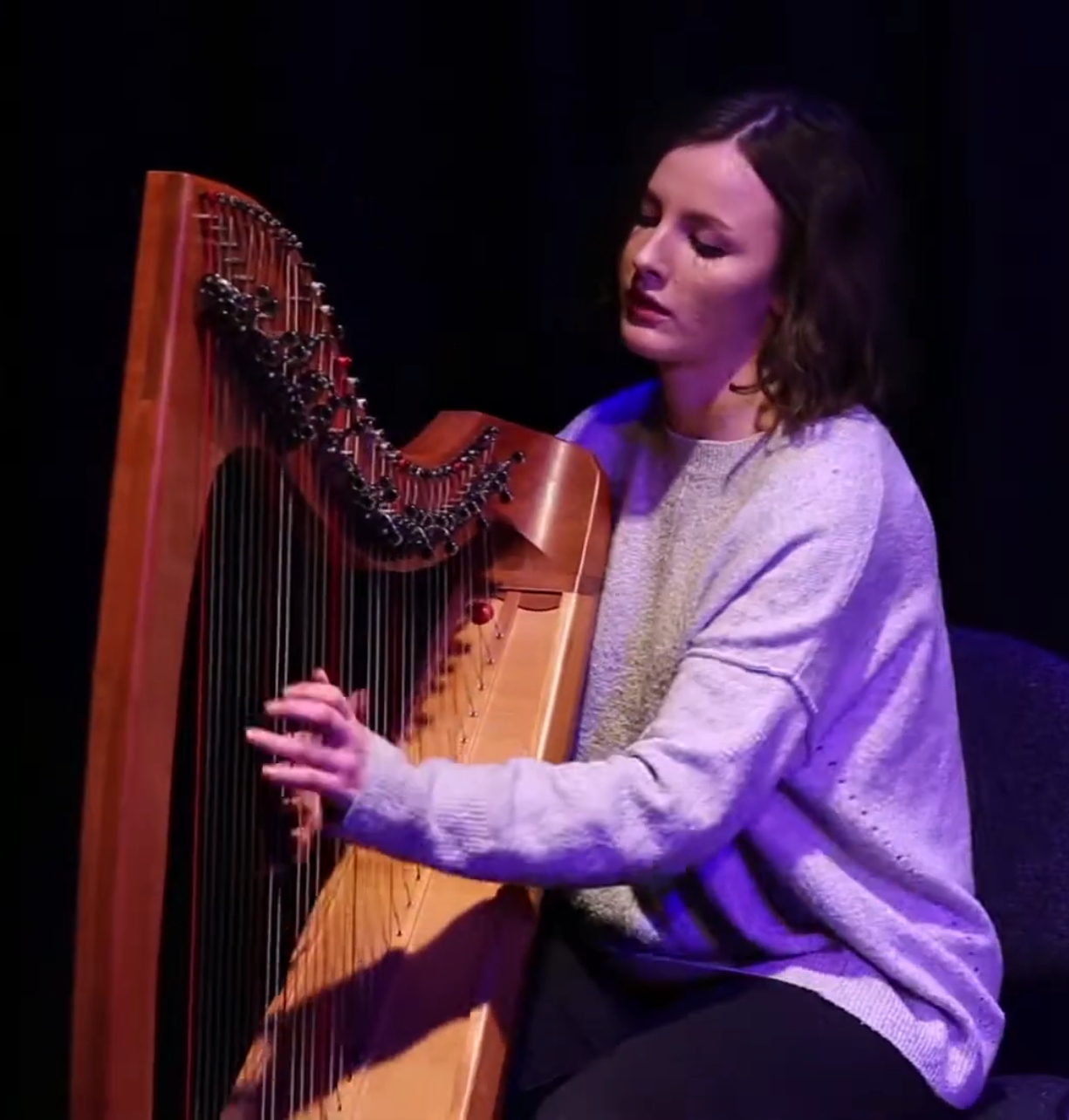
Royle in 2018

This was followed by Royle's second seven-track release Woven in 2019. Scran also released an album titled Nane. Royle performed at the 2019 Celtic Congress and Festival Interceltique de Lorient. At the latter, she was awarded the Camac Trophy's Third Prize.

Royle contributed to Catch the Sparrow's 2023 EP Winter Flowers. She and Sarah Mercer won the Arrane son Mannin to represent the Isle of Man at the 2024 Pan Celtic Song Contest. Royle appeared on Gef's 30 under 30 list from the Isle of Man Arts Council.

== In media ==
Royle was the subject of a 2019 short documentary titled Mera directed by Patrick Crellin and Bethany White.

== Discography ==
- The Ballaglass Set (2018)
- Woven (2019)
