= David Gibb (musician) =

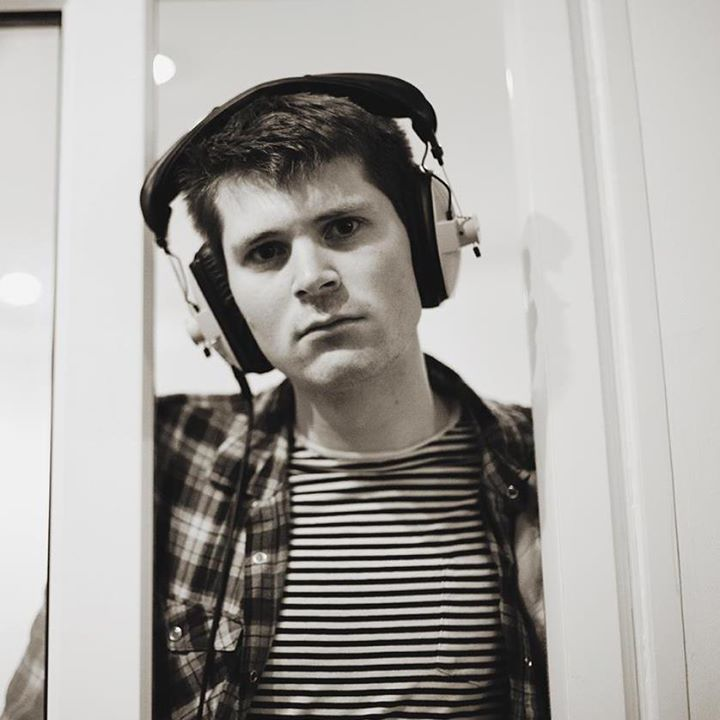
- Gibb in 2012

Background information
- Born: 1 July 1990 (age 36)
- Origin: Belper, Derbyshire, England
- Genres: Folk, Pop, Big Band
- Occupation: Singer-songwriter
- Instrument: Multi-instrumentalist
- Years active: 2006–present
- Label: Hairpin Records
- Website: http://www.davidgibb.com

David Gibb (born 1 July 1990) is a children's musician, songwriter and author from Belper, Derbyshire. He was a finalist of the BBC Radio 2 Young Folk Award 2011, as well as winning the 'Highly Commended' prize at the Young Storyteller of the Year Awards the same year. Since 2014 he has focused on making music for children and families, as well as writing stories for children including Too Many Bubbles, which was published by Simon & Schuster in 2020.

== Career ==
=== Early career ===
Gibb began performing and writing songs as a solo artist after finishing school in 2008. After being introduced to hip-hop producer Baby J by a mutual friend, he went on to feature as a guest artist on J's 2008 record Baby Food, including a live session for Huw Stephens on BBC Radio 1. In 2009, Gibb released his debut album, Apple In My Teeth, on Baby J's own label, Baby J Enterprises.

Following a nomination for the BBC Radio 2 Young Folk Award in 2011, Gibb began performing as part of the duo David Gibb & Elly Lucas. They went on to release two critically acclaimed albums and tour extensively throughout the UK including appearances at Cambridge Folk Festival, Sidmouth Folk Week, and Towersey Folk Festival. In 2013, Gibb & Lucas featured in the advertising campaign for Gola trainers, and copies of their album Up Through The Woods were shipped with all order from the Gola online store.

=== Music for families ===
In 2014, following the end of his musical partnership with Elly Lucas, Gibb released his first album for children entitled Letters Through Your Door, drawing on traditional folk music as well showcasing original songs. The album featured a number of guests from the English folk scene including Nancy Kerr, Lucy Ward, Jez Lowe and Bella Hardy. This was followed by two more albums for families in 2017 and 2019.

In 2020, Gibb collaborated with American children's artist and 3-time Grammy nominee Brady Rymer to record a transatlantic family album entitled Songs Across The Pond. This included a ten date tour of the UK and an appearance at Just So Festival in Cheshire.

In 2022, Gibb announced details of his latest album entitled Pedal Onwards, exploring his childhood growing up in what he describes as a 'cycling obsessed' family, and the death of his father from a heart attack in 2017 whilst training on his bike in Derby Arena's velodrome. The album is due for release October 2022.

== Theatre ==
As a composer and songwriter Gibb's theatrical credits include Climb That Tree (Big Imaginations), Three Bears, Jingle’s Magic Sleigh, WISH, Suddenly A Star (The Story Museum), Rolling Down The Road (Half Moon Theatre), David Gibb’s Family Jukebox (Little Seeds Music) and Luna Loves Library (Z-arts). His work has been seen at countless venues across the UK including Sage Gateshead, The Marlowe, Warwick Arts Centre, HOME, artsdepot, and Nottingham Theatre Royal.

Gibb has been commissioned to write songs and run project by organisations including Andersen Press, Birmingham Hippodrome, Egmont, Sinfonia Viva, the English Folk Dance and Song Society, and Eden Project.

== Books ==
In 2020, Gibb's first picture book for children, Too Many Bubbles, was published by Simon & Schuster. This was followed by The David Gibb Songbook, a collection of his songs for children with chords and lyrics, illustrated by Stacey Thomas, and published by Little Seeds Music.

His latest book, Two Wheels, is scheduled to be published by Walker Books in 2023.

== Discography ==
Year	Album	Label	Notes
2009	Apple In My Teeth	Baby J Enterprises	
2011	There Are Birds In My Garden	Hairpin Records	
2012	Old Chairs To Mend	Hairpin Records	With Elly Lucas
2013	Up Through The Woods	Hairpin Records	With Elly Lucas
2014	Letters Through Your Door	Hairpin Records	
2017	Climb That Tree	Little Seeds Music	
2019	Rolling Down The Road	Little Seeds Music	
2020	Songs Across The Pond	Little Seeds Music/Bumblin' Bee Records	With Brady Rymer
