= John Dowling (musician) =

British banjo player

John Dowling is a British banjo player.

Dowling was born in Cornwall, England. He won first place at the BBC Radio 2 Young Folk Award in 2000 with his band the Black Cat Theory, and went on to become the first European ever to win first place at the USA bluegrass banjo championship held at Winfield, Kansas, in 2002. In 2007, he was featured as a master class tutor in a BBC1 reality series Play It Again along with Mark Knopfler, Jools Holland and Courtney Pine.
