= Isle of Media =

Isle of Media is a non-profit, public/private partnership, launched in 2016, to promote and support the Isle of Man's video and digital media related sector. Executives of the media and broadcast industries and Isle of Man Film provide support for businesses interested in co-financing within, or relocating operations to, the Isle of Man.

Isle of Media was one of 16 sponsors of the 2017 Celtic Media Festival held in the island. It was at this event that Isle of Media announced that a UK local TV group had expressed an interest to establish a dedicated home television channel for the Isle of Man.

Isle of Media was nominated in the 2017 Grierson Award for the best Natural History Documentary.

In the 2017 Department of Economic Development Strategic Review, the Isle of Media is twice briefly mentioned, as one element within an industry development proposal suggested as a "new media cluster", and in the proposed launch of the new Department for Enterprise, being part of the wider Creative Industries sector of the Island. In December 2017 Isle of Media also contributed an economic strategy for the island's digital media sector.

In January 2018 the organisation appointed Michael Wilson, previously with Sky and ITV, as chief executive. Ellen Windemuth (CEO of Off the Fence) joined the advisory later.
