= Dogan Mehmet =

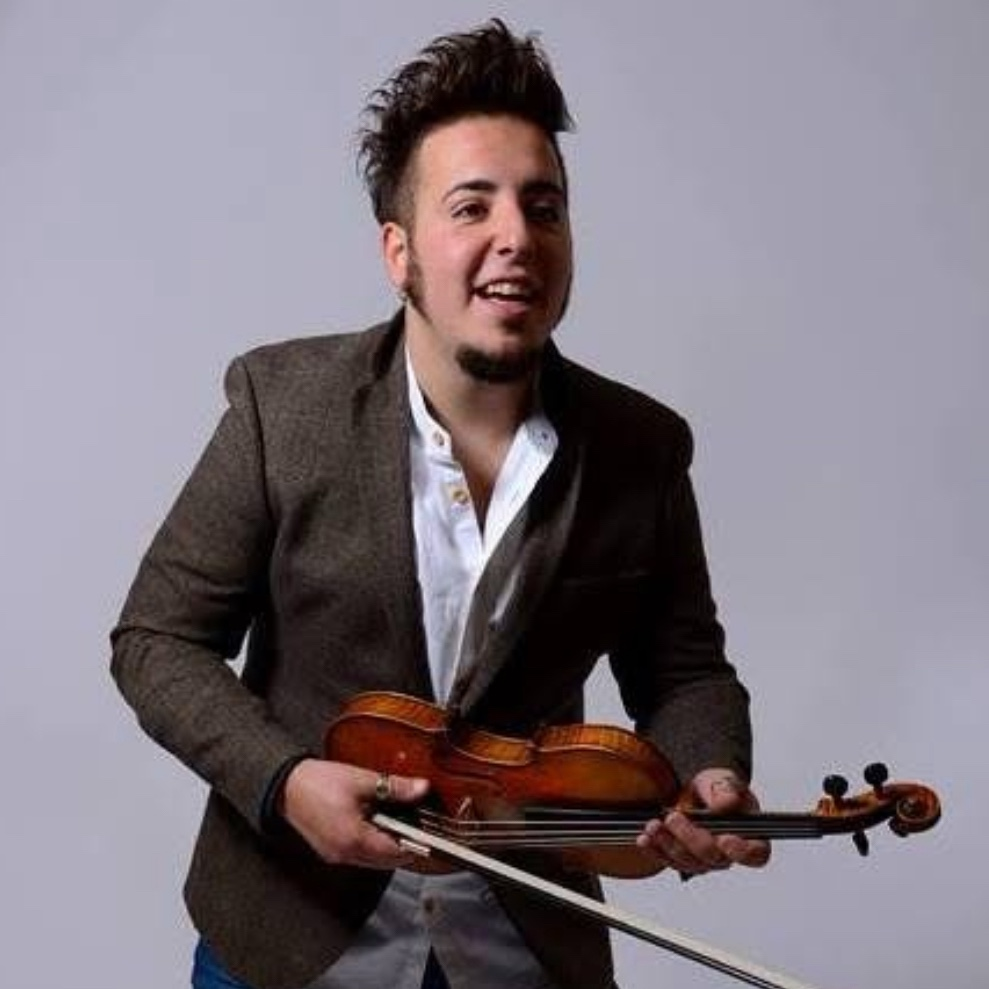

Background information
- Born: March 31, 1990 (age 36); Brighton, England, UK
- Genres: Folk, Cypriot Traditional Music
- Occupations: Musician, Barber
- Instruments: Vocals, Violin, Melodeon, Tenor guitar, Bass, Piano, Piano Accordion, Oud, Saz, Bouzouki, Cajon, Darbuka, Djembe, Percussion and others.

Dogan Mehmet (born in Brighton, England, on 31 March 1990) is a British stage performer and musician of Turkish Cypriot descent. Mehmet writes a mixture of English and Turkish Cypriot folk songs and tunes.

== Early life ==
Mehmet was born in Brighton to parents from the Turkish part of Cyprus (Northern Cyprus), making him a first-generation Turkish-Cypriot. Raised in a multicultural environment, he was exposed to both British and Cypriot cultures, which influenced his upbringing. He is bilingual, fluent in both English and Turkish.

== Career ==
Mehmet began his performing career with the Brighton Theatre Group at the age of 11. He studied Music Technology and Production at Northbrook College from 2006 to 2007. He holds a Grade 8 certification in both voice and violin.

In 2007, Mehmet appeared on BBC 1's The Omid Djalali Show, featuring in both the first and last episodes of Season 1.

He was a finalist in the 2008's BBC Young Folk Awards. That same year, his EP "Unlimited" was released, followed by his album "Gypsyhead" in November 2009. Work on his second album began during the winter of 2010, and "Outlandish" was released in 2012. He has toured the UK and performed with his band at various festivals, including regional Folk Festivals, Beautiful Days, London Remixed Festival, Larmer Tree, WOMAD, and Glastonbury.

He participated in Morris dancing and Rapper Sword Dance with various Morris dance groups, including Brighton Morris and Newcastle Kingsmen, which complemented his passion for folk music.

Mehmet attended Newcastle University from 2009 to 2013, where he studied Folk and Traditional Music. During the end of his final year, he was a member of the percussion group STOMP.

He has performed with notable artists such as James Fagan, Martin Carthy, and Eliza Carthy, and has also made a guest appearances with the global folk band The Imagined Village.

From March 2013 to March 2014, Mehmet joined the London West End production of War Horse, taking on the role of Songman, the storyteller and musical narrator of the production's songs. Due to the demanding nature of the role, with eight shows a week, he shared the part with Ben Murray, alternating each week. When one performed as Songman, the other took on the role of musical narrator, providing instrumental accompaniment, backing vocals, and performing in the ensemble. In the summer of 2013, he also performed on BBC Radio 3's World Routes Show.

He participated in Season 3 of the singing competition The Voice in 2013, performing "Englishman in New York" by Sting, though his performance was not aired.

From June 2014 to February 2015, Mehmet performed in the West End production of Once: The Musical.

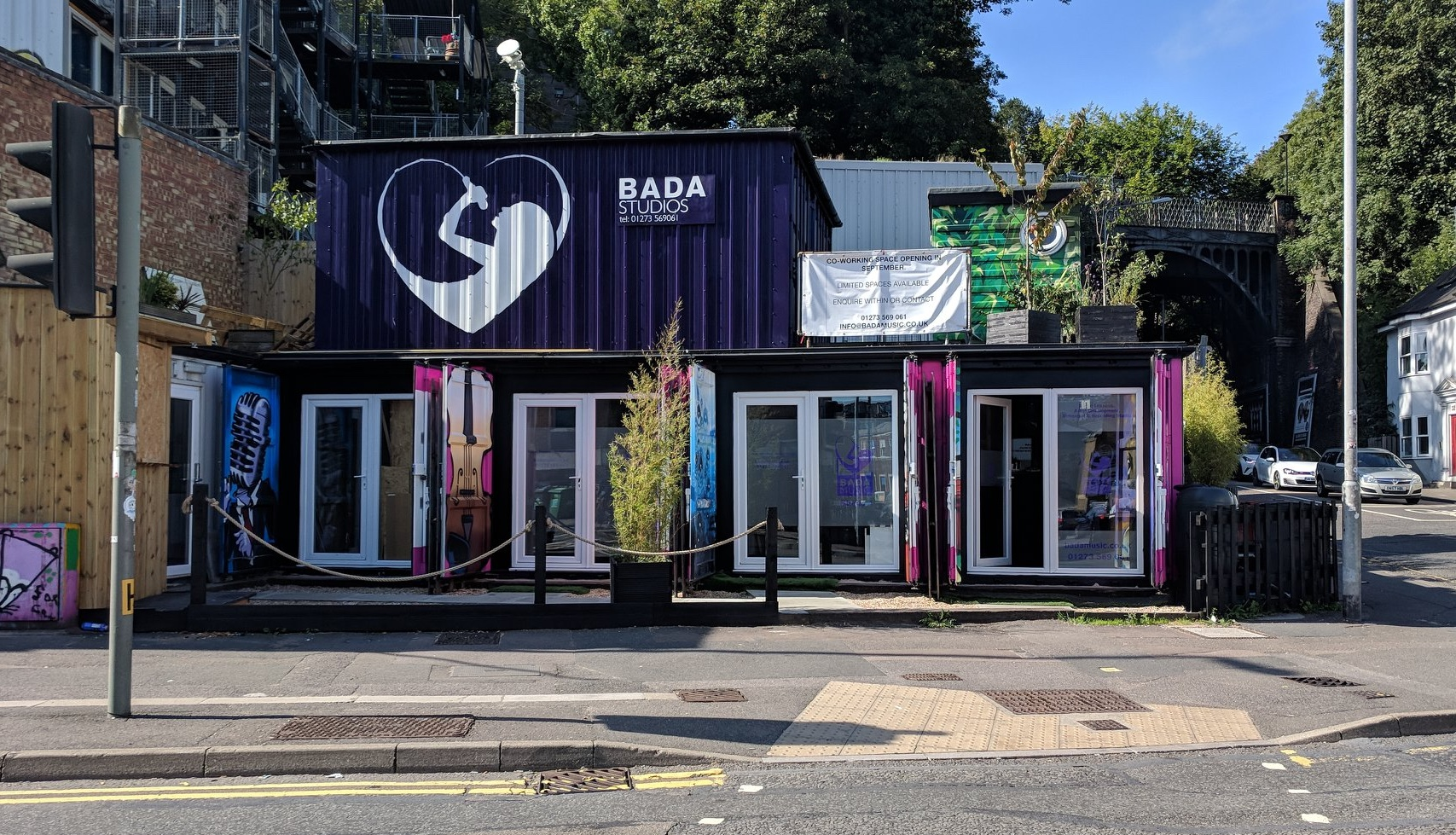
Bada Music Studios

In 2017, he launched BADA Music, a Music School offering lessons in music, instruments, and vocals. Working as a singing and voice coach, he established the studio in "container village" on the site of the former derelict scrap metal yard, Cobbler's Thumb, in Brighton.

In May 2018, he performed at Shakespeare's Globe Theatre in the production of The Two Noble Kinsmen, where he played the fiddle.

In 2018, he expanded the space by opening a coffee shop next to the studio called "Expresso Yourself." Both the music studio and coffee shop closed in 2020 due to the impact of the COVID-19 pandemic.

In July 2020, he opened a barber shop named Maverick Delta Studios in Peacehaven, near Brighton.

In December 2024, he opened a coffee bar again with the name "Expresso Yourself" opposite to his barber shop in Peacehaven.

== Personal life ==
Dogan is often called "Doe," a nickname that arose because many non-Turkish speakers are unaware that the "g" in his name is silent.

Dogan is one of three siblings in his immediate family, having a brother and a sister. Additionally, he has three half-siblings from his father's first marriage.

In 2011, he dated English Folk Musician Eliza Carthy. While working on Once: The Musical in 2014, he met his future wife. The couple welcomed their daughter on July 3, 2018.
