= Tim Steiner =

British composer (born 1965)

Tim Steiner (born 9 August 1965) is a British composer. He is best known for his creation and direction of extremely large-scale musical events.

== Biography ==
Steiner has directed over 500 participatory music projects in partnership with orchestras, opera companies, arts centres, festivals and production companies throughout Europe.

His work often exploits the potential of outsider groups, beginners and amateurs; people of all skill levels are encouraged to participate.

In an interview with The Independent, he summed up his approach with the phrase: "These people, this place, this time".
