= Sarah Hayes (musician) =

British folk musician

- Born: 1986 or 1987 (age 38–39); The Wirral, England
- Origin: Glasgow, Scotland
- Genres: Folk music; Indie folk
- Occupations: Musician; singer
- Instruments: Flute; piano; whistle; accordion
- Years active: 2000–present
- Label: Night Vad
- Website: sarahhayes.net

Sarah Hayes is a British folk musician and multi-instrumentalist. She is a member of the indie folk band Admiral Fallow and also a solo artist.

Hayes was a finalist in the BBC Radio 2 Young Folk Award for three years in a row (2000–2002) and was nominated for the 2015 Composer of the Year in the Scots Trad Music Awards.

== Early life ==
Hayes was born on The Wirral, but moved at the age of two and a half to the village of Warkworth in Northumberland. She learnt recorder, piano and the flute. Folk singer Sandra Kerr lived nearby and encouraged Hayes to listen to folk music. Kerr's encouragement was crucial, since there was no interest in the music from Hayes's peer group.

"Nobody at my school likes folk", sighs 14 year old Northumbrian, Sarah Hayes, a song finalist in this year's Radio 2 Young Folk Awards. "But I love the music, it's funny being part of this big folk thing that my friends know nothing about. But it makes me sad there's nobody of my age here to sing with me".

Hayes also attended Folkworks summer schools and workshops in Newcastle upon Tyne.

After being a finalist in the BBC Radio 2 Young Folk Award for three years in a row (2000 – 2002), she attended the Royal Scottish Academy of Music and Drama in 2005. There she was awarded a Masters in Music Performance (with distinction).

== Musical career ==
In 2007 Hayes became a founding member of Brother Louis Collective, forerunner to Admiral Fallow, after meeting fellow band members in college.

Hayes also plays in three classical chamber ensembles, two other folk groups, and has taught at summer schools for Folkworks Junior School, Tinto School, and at the Royal Conservatoire of Scotland.

Hayes was nominated in the Composer of The Year category for the Scots Trad Music Awards in 2015.

== Recordings ==
See also Admiral Fallow discography.

=== Mainspring ===
Hayes released her debut solo EP Mainspring in 2013.

=== Wildings ===
With Jennifer Austin (piano) and Fiona MacAskill (fiddle), Wildings was released on 29 July 2015.

=== Woven ===
Woven began as a commission for New Voices, a series designed to produce new work from artists on the Scottish traditional music scene, at the Celtic Connections festival in 2014. It consists of fragments of traditional folk songs set to music composed by Hayes. It was released on 20 November 2015.

Reviews of the album were positive, with The Scotsman describing Hayes as "a boldly emerging new talent". The Guardian described Woven as an "inventive concept work" and "a fresh, emotional collection that shows her skills as a composer, multi-instrumentalist and singer."

=== You Tell Me ===
As You Tell Me, a duo with Peter Brewis, she released You Tell Me in 2019.
