= Pillowfish =

Pillowfish are a progressive folk duo comprising Tom Drinkwater (vocals, Irish bouzouki, guitar) and Helen Bell (viola and fiddle).

Formed in mid-2005 in York, England, they released their first album, Common Knowledge in 2006.

They are stylistically eclectic and draw on a variety of influences in their original material, which is mainly a mix of political song, whimsical absurdity and folk-influenced instrumentals.

Drinkwater's acerbic vocal style seems to polarise reviewers, and has been likened to Tymon Dogg, Robin Williamson, and Ian Anderson.

== Discography ==
- Common Knowledge (2006) (Pillowfish PFCD0601)
1. "Seven Stolen Stars"
2. "The Revolution will be in Colour"
3. "The First Bonfire / Pillowfish"
4. "Addiction"
5. "The Ice Sculptor"
6. "The World to Mend"
7. "Cruel Sea"
8. "Move your Money"
9. "Hunting the Off-Licence / Trip to Heligoland"
10. "She's So Dark"
11. "Fingerprints and Smudges"

Common Knowledge has been reviewed by David Kidman in Netrhythms, Tim Moon in Tykes News, Tim Carroll of Folkwords, Mike Wilson on Folking.com, Fiddle On magazine, and Rock'n'Reel magazine.
