= Carrivick Sisters =

English musical duo

The Carrivick Sisters
- Origin: Devon, England
- Genres: Folk
- Years active: 2006–present
- Members: Charlotte Carrivick; Laura Carrivick
- Website: https://www.thecarrivicksisters.co.uk/

The Carrivick Sisters are twins Laura and Charlotte Carrivick from South Devon, England, who perform as a musical duo. They combine original songs, based on old stories, legends and folklore from their local area, with American bluegrass and old-time music.

The Carrivick Sisters have been performing as a duo since 2006 and turned professional in 2007. They were finalists for the BBC Radio 2 Young Folk Award in 2010.

Their 2013 album Over the Edge featured Blair Dunlop on harmony vocals and, like their previous album From the Fields, was produced by Josh Rusby (brother of folk singer Kate Rusby).

== Discography ==
Album	Release date	Label
My Own Two Feet	2006	The Carrivick Sisters
Better Than 6 Cakes	2007	The Carrivick Sisters
Jupiter's Corner	2009	The Carrivick Sisters
From the Fields	2011	The Carrivick Sisters
Over the Edge	2013	The Carrivick Sisters
10 Years Live	2017	The Carrivick Sisters
Illustrated Short Stories	2022	The Carrivick Sisters
