= Dan Wilde =

- Born: Dan Wilde; 24 December 1984 (age 41)
- Origin: Cambridge, England
- Genres: Folk
- Occupations: Musician, songwriter, singer, singer-songwriter
- Instruments: Vocals, guitar
- Years active: 2005–present
- Label: Wild Sound Recordings
- Website: danwilde.net

Dan Wilde (born 24 December 1984) is an English singer-songwriter and musician from Blackpool, now living in Cambridge. He has released three solo albums so far, including With Fire in Mind and Rhythm on the City Wall, which was released in April 2016.

== Career ==
While growing up, Wilde played in a number of bands. After taking a course in contemporary music in London, he took a degree in Jazz at the Leeds College of Music. After graduating, he wrote songs for his first solo album, where he worked with Ian Bailey and producer Gary Hall. For his second album, Wilde worked with Karl Odlum and Dave Gerard (from Gerard and the Watchmen). His third album, "Rhythm on the City Wall", is released on 1 April 2016.

Wilde has supported Karine Polwart, Cara Dillon, Martin Taylor, Mark Geary, Karima Francis and Ezio and has played at Cambridge Folk Festival, Beverley Folk Festival and Moonbeams Festival. Wilde performed at the Moonbeams Festival in 2011. In 2011, he spent a month on tour in the east coast of the US, playing gigs from Maine to Nashville. In June and July 2013, he was on tour in Germany and toured again in Germany and Switzerland in 2014 and in Germany in January 2016.

== Musical influences ==
Dan Wilde cites Bob Dylan, Neil Young, Tom Waits and Paul Simon among those who have influenced his music.

== Discography ==
=== Albums ===
- This Is the Place (2011)
- With Fire in Mind (2013)
- Rhythm on the City Wall (2016)
