= Luke Jackson (singer) =

British singer-songwriter (born 1994)

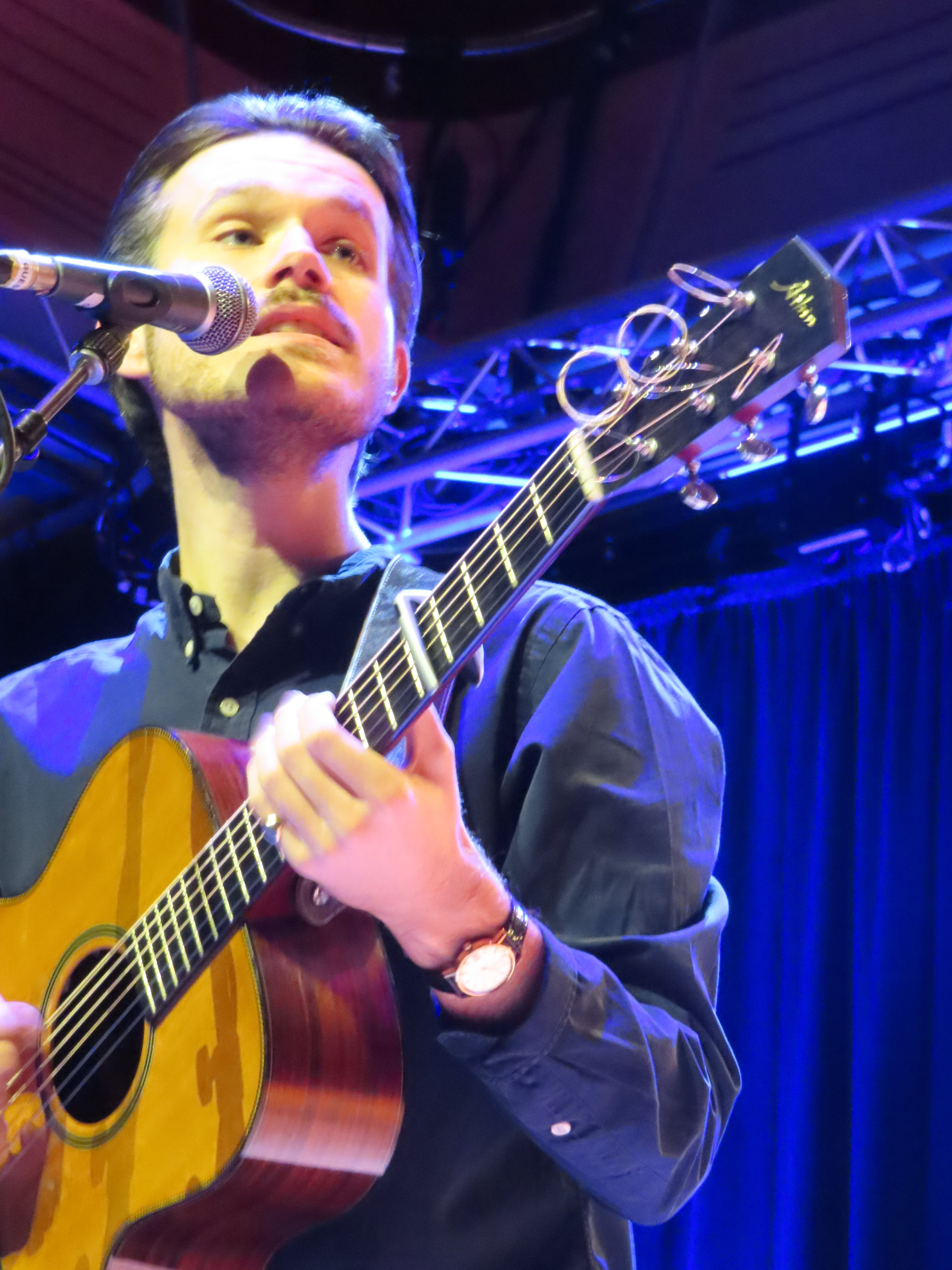
Jackson in 2023

Luke Jackson (born 19 June 1994) is a British singer-songwriter from Canterbury. He started playing guitar when he was ten, and made his first public performance at his primary school's leaving assembly He recorded his first album More than Boys, produced by Martyn Joseph, when he was 18.

He has been nominated for the BBC Radio 2 Young Folk Award and the BBC Radio 2 Folk Awards "Horizon Award" for best emerging talent. He received a career development bursary from Help Musicians UK.

Jackson has toured extensively, including four tours with Amy Wadge who co-wrote songs on Sheeran’s first EP Songs I Wrote With Amy. Jackson has also toured with Ed Sheeran and Marillion.

== Discography ==
- More than Boys (2012)
- Fumes and Faith (2014)
- Tall Tales and Rumours (2016)
- Solo | Duo | Trio (live) (2018)
- Journals (2019)

=== Compilation ===
- PQ47, Free CD for The Passport Q members, 2012.
  - Run and Hide
- With Martyn Joseph: PQ50, Free CD for The Passport Q members, 2013.
  - Roads
  - Bakers Woods

== Awards ==
- Horizon Award for Best Emerging Talent (2013) (finalists)
- BBC Radio 2 Young Folk Award (2013) (finalist)
- Fatea Male Artist of the Year (2014)
- Fatea Male Artist of the Year (2016)
- Fatea Album of the Year - Journals (2020)
