= Isle of Man Film =

Agency of the Isle of Man Government

Isle Of Man Film
- Type: Subsidiary
- Industry: Regional Screen Agency
- Founded: 1995
- Headquarters: Isle of Man
- Products: Motion pictures
- Parent: Isle of Man Government

Isle of Man Film was a regional screen agency, part of Isle of Man Government’s Department of Economic Development. They drive inward investment in relation to film and the creative industries. Since 1995 Isle of Man Film has built a worldwide reputation, having co-financed and co-produced over 100 feature film and television dramas which have all filmed on the Isle of Man. They are one of the busiest areas of film production in the British Isles.

Isle of Man Film offers a package of services for film producers and production companies. Loans and equity investment, a wealth of natural locations, a talented crew base, experienced facilities and services companies, together with a film-friendly Government.

Isle of Man Film commits funding support to micro-budget projects, under the banner of the Mannin Shorts scheme, an educational platform aimed at providing Isle of Man residents with the skills required to secure work in the Manx film industry. They provide numerous workshops throughout the year; including directing, cinematography, post-production, creative writing, acting and more.

In 2018, Isle of Man Film folded into the Digital agency of the Department of Enterprise. They now work with the public–private partnership, Isle of Media, a new media business development not-for-profit agency to attract a wider range of digital media businesses to locate or relocate to the Isle of Man.

== Filmography ==
- Where Hands Touch (2018)
- Mindhorn (2016)
- Billionaire Ransom (2014)
- Spooks: The Greater Good (2015)
- Robot Overlords (2015)
- Camera Trap (2014)
- The Christmas Candle (2013)
- Honour (2014)
- Belle (2013)
- Dom Hemingway (2013)
- Solace in Wicca (2012)
- Rocket's Island (2012)
- Ashes (2012)
- TT3D: Closer to the Edge (2011)
- The Shadow Line (2011)
- Albatross (2011)
- The Decoy Bride (2011)
- Chico & Rita (2010)
- The Disappearance of Alice Creed (2009)
- Heartless (2009)
- Wild Target (2009)
- Iron Man: Armoured Adventures (season 1, 2009)
- The Cottage (2008)
- A Bunch of Amateurs (2008)
- Me and Orson Welles (2008)
- Miss Potter (2006)
- Stormbreaker (2006)
- Keeping Mum (2005)
- Revolver (2005)
- Trauma (2004)
- Five Children and It (2004)
- Churchill: The Hollywood Years (2004)
- Blackball (2003)
- The Martins (2001)
- Gabriel & Me (2001)
- Best (2000)
- Tom's Midnight Garden (1999)
- Waking Ned (1998)
- Stiff Upper Lips (1998)
- Breeders (1997)
