= Sunjay =

- Born: 23 September 1993 (age 32); Derby, Derbyshire, England
- Genres: Folk, blues, singer-songwriter
- Instruments: Vocal, guitar, feet
- Years active: 2011–present
- Labels: New Mountain Music; KM Records
- Website: www.sunjay.tv

Sunjay Edward Brain (born 23 September 1993) is a British singer-songwriter and guitarist from Stourbridge in the West Midlands of England.

== Early life ==
Sunjay Edward Brain was born on 23 September 1993 in Derby, the son of an English father, Roger Brain (born 17 September 1945), and an Indian mother, Mamta Sekhri. He began singing and playing guitar at age four after watching a TV programme entitled The Day The Music Died, a documentary detailing the brief but eventful career of Buddy Holly. Growing up, Sunjay spent most of his time singing and playing guitar.

Sunjay attended Pedmore Church of England Primary School and later The Royal School, Wolverhampton, where he won a music scholarship. Sunjay credits the school with nurturing his talent. After completing his GCSEs (and gaining 10 A-C passes) Sunjay attended Hagley Roman Catholic High School, where he spent a year studying AS levels. As music became more of a focus for him, schoolwork declined and he left the sixth form to study music at Kidderminster College. Sunjay passed the Rockschool RSL Level 4 Music Diploma with Distinction, receiving 100%, aged 18.

== Professional career ==
A local paper misprinted his surname as "Brayne", leading to Sunjay adopting the surname at the start of his career. To prevent the confusion of reverting to his real surname, he dropped his surname in 2013. His album, Seems So Real, and his single "The Fire Down Below" were originally released under the name Sunjay Brayne, before being re-released under the name Sunjay. His third album, the eponymous Sunjay, received a three-starred review in The Daily Telegraph in which the reviewer, Martin Chilton, praised his "fluent and intricate guitar".

== Awards and recognition ==
Sunjay was a finalist in the 2012 BBC Radio 2 Young Folk Award. At the 2012 Wath Festival he won the Young Performers Award, chosen by judges Lucy Ward (musician), Dave Eyre (folk music broadcaster), Tom Sweeney (RootBeat Records) and competition founder, Charlie Barker. Later that year Sunjay was also a winner at the New Roots Competition in St Albans. In 2014 he was nominated three times at the Exposure Music Awards. At the 2014 British Blues Awards he was nominated in the Young Artist category.

In 2012 he supported Wizz Jones and John Renbourn on several of their joint UK tour dates. Following this he supported folk-rock band Steeleye Span on several of their 2013 winter UK tour dates. Sunjay was tour support for Kathryn Roberts & Sean Lakeman on their "Persoane" spring tour in 2018. Other notable artists Sunjay has supported include: Mud Morganfield, Albert Lee, Chris Smither, Ian Siegal, Curved Air, Fairport Convention, Phil Beer, Spiers & Boden, Graham Gouldman, John Illsley, and Terry Reid.

== Discography ==
=== Albums ===
Album	Release date	Label
Seems So Real	29 September 2011	KM Records (KM077)
One Night Only	20 November 2013	New Mountain Music (NMM2013102)
Sunjay	29 September 2014	New Mountain Music (NMM2014201)
Black & Blues*	30 November 2015	Sunjay Ltd. (SLCD201501)
Sunjay Sings Buddy	1 December 2017	Sunjay Ltd. (SLCD201701)
Devil Came Calling	7 June 2019	Sunjay Ltd. (SLCD201901)

=== Singles ===
Single	Release date	Label
"The Fire Down Below" (Bob Seger) / "Don't Breathe A Word" (Alan Whittle)	1 April 2013	KM Records (KMS079)
"Heartbeat" (Bob Montgomery/Norman Petty)	22 November 2017	Sunjay Limited (SL201701S)
"Ghost Train" (David Morton/Sunjay Brain) / "Too Close To The Sun" (Sunjay Brain/Les Glover/Henry Priestman)	10 May 2019	Sunjay Limited (SL201901S)

== Personal life ==
Sunjay lives in Brierley Hill, West Midlands. Between 2013 and 2017, Sunjay hosted and organised the Stourbridge Folk Club once a month at Katie Fitzgerald's pub in Stourbridge. Guest artists Sunjay hosted at the club included Chris Smither, Vin Garbutt, Ian Siegal, Dan Owen, Gilmore Roberts, Martyn Joseph, and Matt Andersen.
