= Tourism in the Isle of Man =

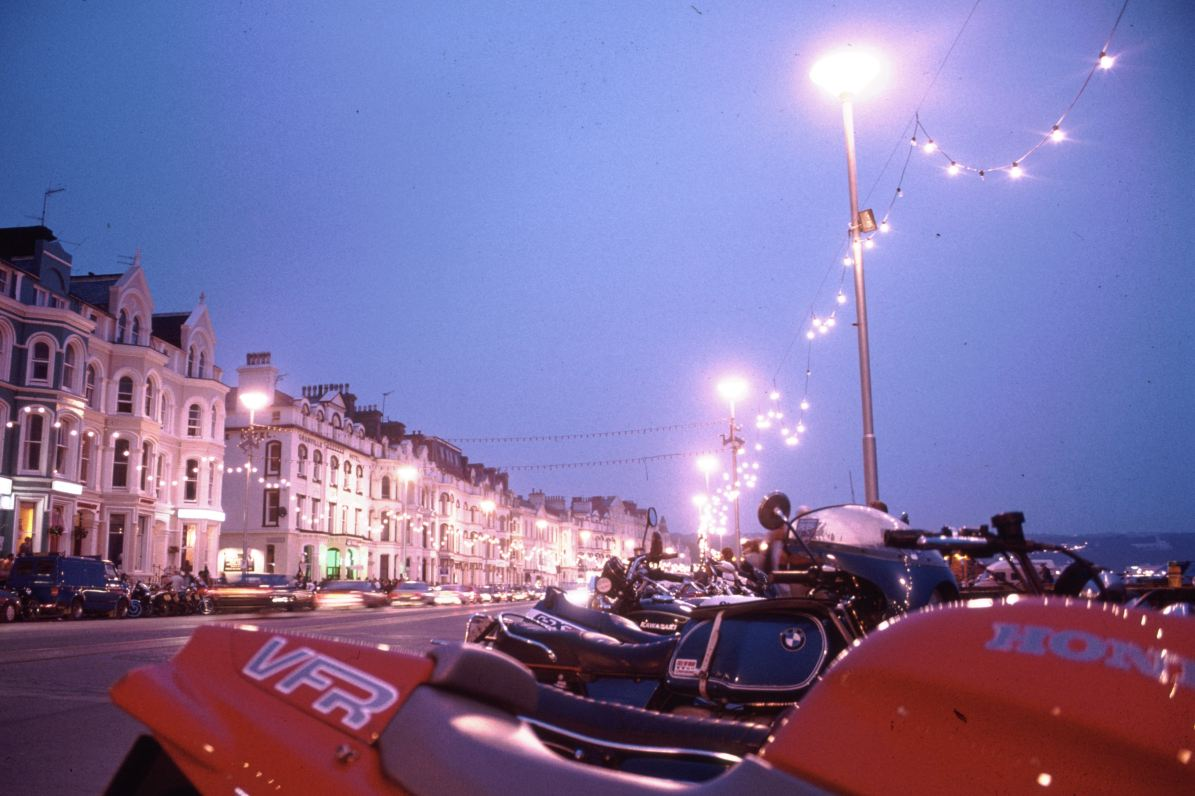
The seafront of Douglas was formerly a string of thriving hotels and guesthouses

The tourism industry of the Isle of Man has been an important element in the economy for over a century.

== History ==
In the early days visitors were mostly richer British families. Key for the development of the sector in the Victorian Era was the introduction of ferry connections with steamships between Liverpool and the Isle of Man, the Isle of Man Railway, and the Victoria Pier in Douglas.

Later in the 19th and early 20th centuries, the island was the destination for working-class families, mainly from the north of England and from Ireland. In 1964 tourism, which was already in decline, "was still responsible for 75 per cent of the gross value of the production of the major forms of industry: moreover, 21 per cent of the working population found employment in some branch of the tourist industry".

The Edwardian era brought the mass tourism "driven mostly by the Lancashire cotton" industry which gave its workers "a one week 'Wakes week' holiday".

== Today ==
In the 21st century, tourism is rather different. Today the tourist accommodation sector only accounts for 0.3% of the Gross National Income (GNI), and employed 629 people in 2016.

In 2016 an estimated 135,000 tourists stayed in paid accommodation on the island; in addition, almost 100,000 stayed with friends or family, and there were almost 60,000 business visitors including day trippers.

Despite the historical decline in tourism, many tourists visit the island for the famous TT races (about 45,000 in 2017), and for its rolling countryside and coastline.

== See also ==
- Registered Buildings of the Isle of Man
- Category:Tourist attractions in the Isle of Man
