= Hatful of Rain (band) =

English folk and bluegrass band

Background information
- Origin: Brighton and Shoreham-by-Sea, Sussex, England
- Genres: Bluegrass music and acoustic folk
- Years active: 2010–present
- Labels: Union Music Store; Long Way Home Music
- Members: Fred Gregory – guitar, mandolin, vocals • Phil Jones – double bass, vocals, clawhammer banjo • Chloe Overton – vocals, guitars, mandolin
- Past members: Ben McGuire – banjo • James Shenton – fiddle, piano, harmonica
- Website: www.hatfulofrain.co.uk

Hatful of Rain are an English acoustic music group from Brighton and Shoreham-by-Sea, Sussex. They perform original material that combines English folk sounds with harmony singing and American bluegrass music. Critically acclaimed, (Note: Reviewer Steve Price describes the group as "gifted", giving "impressively polished performances" and having a "confidently beautiful sound" with, in Chloe Overton, a "captivating lead voice". Price, Steve (12 March 2014). "What's on in Twickenham at Twickfolk in March and April". Your Twickenham. Archived from the original on 7 April 2014.) the band came to the attention of broadcaster Mike Harding, who played their music on his BBC Radio 2 show. The band also performed live on BBC Radio 2's Bob Harris Sunday programme on 24 March 2013.

== Origins ==
Mandolin player Fred Gregory (who is also with the group Porchlight Smoker), vocalist Chloe Overton and banjo/bass player Phil Jones first performed together at a 2010 South Coast folk festival, and were later joined by violinist James Shenton who has played with the London Symphony Orchestra and the Balanescu Quartet. The band's name comes from the lyric "Got a head full of lightning and a hatful of rain", in the Tom Waits song "Long Way Home".

== Recording history ==
Their debut album, Way Up on the Hill, was released on 30 May 2012. Actress Amanda Abbington performed in the official video that accompanied the release of The Exit Song, a single from the album. The video was directed by Jamie Freeman (brother of actor Martin Freeman) and Stevie Freeman, who ran the Union Music store in Lewes, East Sussex.

Their second album, The Morning Key, was released on 25 May 2014. The album's title comes from a song by Jones, "Broad Woolly Back", written about his emotional experiences following the death of his father. The album was produced by Al Scott, better known for his work with The Levellers. In a review for Folk Radio UK, Paul Woodgate said that the album "strikes for the heart and head and succeeds on both counts...If you like Rusby, the Wailin’ Jenny's and Cara Dillon, add this to your 'must listen' list". Iain Hazlewood, for Spiral Earth, said: "The combination of mandolin, banjo, bass and fiddle is nigh on perfect, the songs have space to grow but they know exactly when to roll with it."

The band's first EP, Climb the Air, was released on 15 April 2016.

== Discography ==
| Album | Release date | Label |
|---|---|---|
| Way Up on the Hill | 30 May 2012 | Union Music Store (UMS003) |
| The Morning Key | 25 May 2014 | Union Music Store (UMS006) |
| Songs of the Lost and Found | 1 July 2018 | Long Way Home Music (LWHM004) |

| EP | Release date | Label |
|---|---|---|
| Climb the Air | 15 April 2016 | Long Way Home Music (LWHM001) |

| Single | Release date | Label |
|---|---|---|
| "The Exit Song" (digital download) | 23 July 2012 | Union Music Store |
| "These Streets" (digital download) | 28 April 2014 | Union Music Store |
| "Scarlet Ribbon" (digital download) | 28 November 2014 | Union Music Store |

== Personal lives ==
Chloe Overton, the band's singer and lyricist, works as a midwife. She has four children. Fred Gregory, guitar and mandolin, works as a carpenter. Phil Jones, bass and banjo, works as a workplace mediator.
