= Cameraman (disambiguation) =

A cameraman is a professional operator of a film or video camera.

Cameraman or cameramen may also refer to:

- The Cameraman, 1928 film by Buster Keaton
- Cameraman: The Life and Work of Jack Cardiff, 2010 documentary about cinematographer Jack Cardiff
- Cameraman (song), a song by the Field Music
- Cameramen, a race of humanoids in Skibidi Toilet
