= Making a New World =

Studio album by Field Music
- Released: 10 January 2020
- Genres: Pop; rock
- Length: 42:21
- Label: Memphis Industries

Field Music chronology
| Open Here (2018) | Making a New World (2020) | Flat White Moon (2021) |

Singles from Making a New World
- 1. "Only in a Man's World" Released: 18 September 2019; 2. "Money Is a Memory" Released: 20 November 2019; 3. "Beyond That of Courtesy" Released: 11 December 2019; 4. "Do You Read Me?" Released: 3 January 2020

Making a New World is the seventh studio album by English rock band Field Music. It was released through Memphis Industries on 10 January 2020. The songs were originally composed by David and Peter Brewis for a project commissioned by the Imperial War Museum. The album is about the after-effects of World War I and how they impacted the 100 years after the war's end. It is considered the band's first concept album.

The starting point for the museum project was an image called "The End of the War", a visualisation of the vibrations from when gunfire ceased at the exact moment that the war ended. After conducting research, the Brewis brothers decided against writing songs broadly about World War I. They instead focused on individual stories inspired by technological, political, sociological, and cultural advancements over the course of the next century that directly or indirectly stemmed from the war.

A variety of topics are addressed in the songs on Making a New World, including war reparations, social housing reforms, women's suffrage, the Dada movement, the 1989 Tiananmen Square protests and massacre, sanitary napkins, gender realignment operations, and the development of technologies such as ultrasound, synthesisers, and air-to-ground radio communication. The primary recordings for the album came from two real-time band run-throughs by Field Music, recorded in a single day shortly after the original museum performances. The band's guitarist Kevin Dosdale designed visuals used for the former's tour dates and the museum shows.

Making a New World features a diverse mix of styles, genres, and instruments, as well as multiple shifts in mood and tone, sophisticated vocal harmony, and brief instrumental vignettes. The album received generally positive reviews from music critics and was praised for the ambition and originality, with Field Music being complimented for making such lofty subject matter enjoyable. Some critics were more negative, saying it was the wrong platform for the concept, or that too many ideas were contained to form a cohesive album.

== Background and development ==
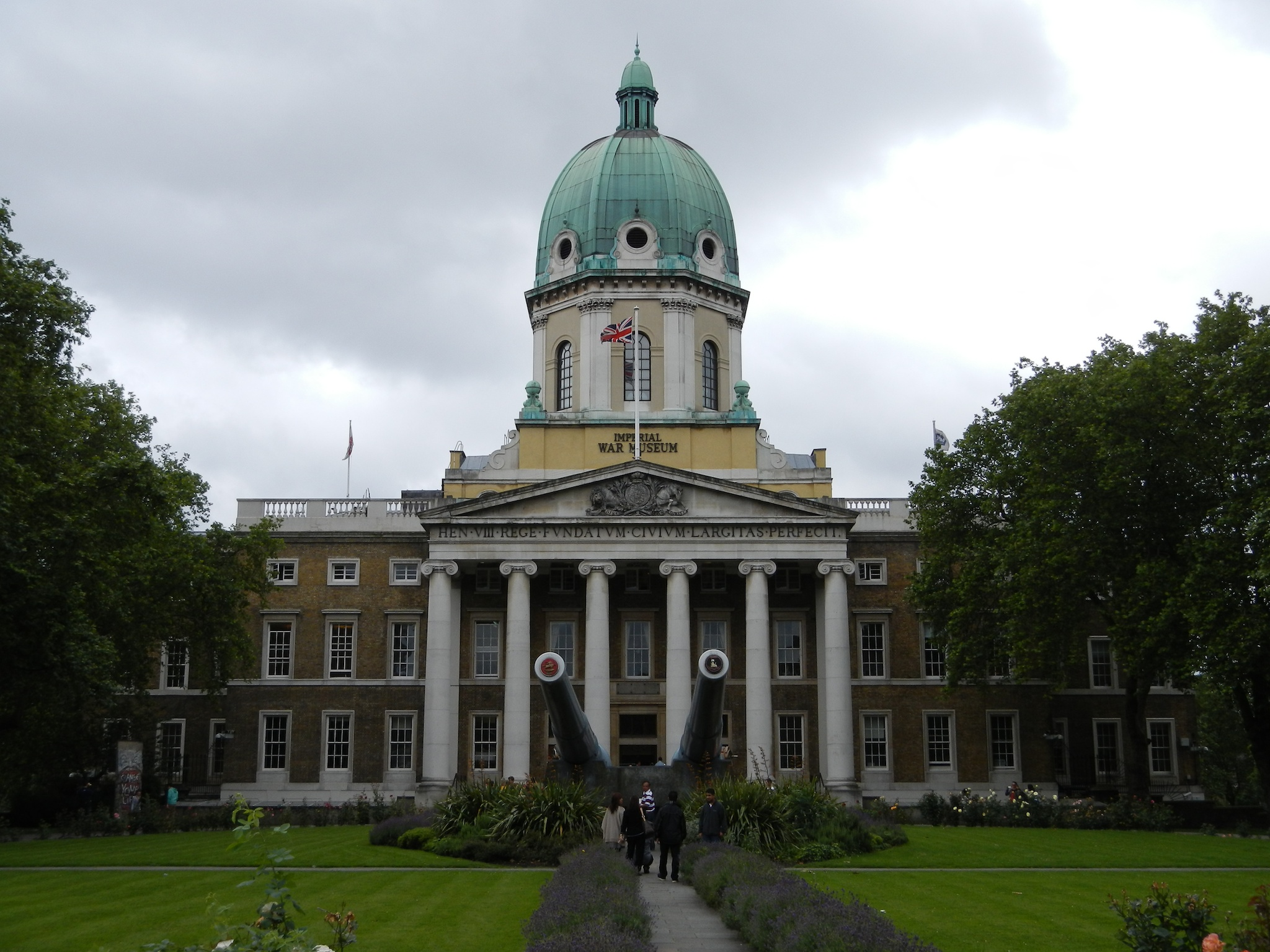
One of the London locations of the Imperial War Museum, which commissioned Field Music to compose the music that ultimately led to Making a New World.

Released through Field Music's label Memphis Industries, Making a New World is about the after-effects of World War I, and is considered the band's first concept album. The songs were originally composed from a project that Field Music prepared for the Imperial War Museum (IWM), which commissioned music as part of its Making a New World season commemorating the centenary of the end of the war and its effects on society afterwards. The program ultimately inspired the name of the album, as did the painting "We Are Making a New World" by war artist Paul Nash. The latter depicts the consequences of war without explicitly showing the conflict itself, which David said was consistent with the band's approach to the album's music. He said the title Making a New World also refers to the many ways in which the world was changed by World War I.

The IWM originally planned to commission the Fall for the project, but when the group's founder Mark E. Smith died, they were forced to seek another band. Andy Martin, who had made music videos for Field Music in the past, was acquainted with officials from the museum and introduced them to the band. The Brewis brothers were not previously familiar with the IWM, and they were initially skeptical about the proposed commission, but became more comfortable with the project after visiting the IWM North branch and discussing it. Although David said Field Music wrote the songs "to order", he said "it didn't feel like hack work". The latter had previously produced works based upon World War I, including a collaboration with the band Warm Digits, and the Royal Northern Sinfonia on a score for Asunder (2016), a film directed by Esther Johnson about the war's effects on a small English town. However, David said his knowledge about World War I was limited to his high school studies and explained this by claiming that "the way you see things at high school: you pay a bit of attention, you find it interesting, but you don't think too deeply about it".

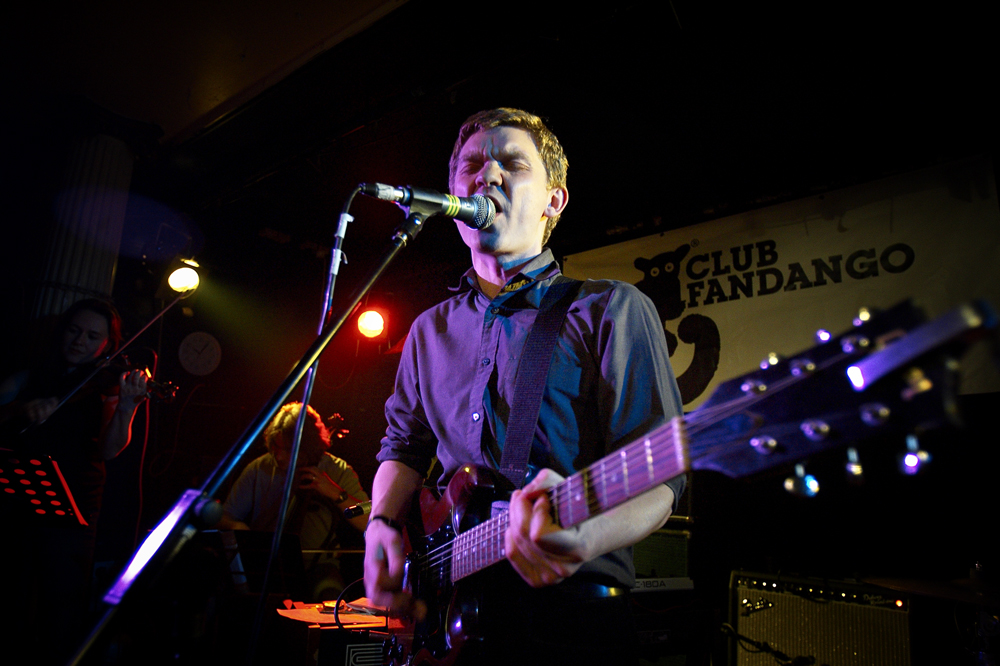
Peter Brewis, a member of the rock band Field Music, which also includes his brother David.

In the spring of 2018, the IWM formally commissioned Field Music to create a commemorative sound and light show based upon a picture about munitions from a 1919 publication by the United States Department of War. The image, entitled "The End of the War", showed a visualisation of the vibrations caused by gunfire during the exact moment of 11 a.m. on 11 November 1918, the moment at which the armistice that ended the war went into effect. The image was created using a technique called sound ranging that used transducers to detect the vibrations, then displayed the distances between peaks with lines on a graph to show the location of enemy armaments. It illustrated one minute of harsh and intense noise, followed by near silence for the same amount of time. David described the image as "this tiny, incomplete fragment, not much more than a moment, but one which could be both the beginning and the ending of a huge story". The band also said this image was both the starting point for their songs and "the start of a new world". David stated that they imagined the lines from the image "continuing across the next hundred years, and we looked for stories which tied back to specific events from the war or the immediate aftermath".

The Brewis brothers began conducting research in September 2018, a process David described as "amateurish", which mostly entailed searching the Internet for stories about the after-effects of World War I. Field Music originally considered creating a primarily instrumental piece; Peter said his initial vision was "something slightly improvised" that drew upon music from the time period of World War I, such as jazz and orchestral works during the Belle Époque, including Igor Stravinsky's The Rite of Spring (1913). However, the brothers' research ultimately inspired them to write songs with lyrics telling specific stories. David said their research led them to subjects that they "couldn't help but write songs about". The music was researched, composed, and prepared in a three-month span between September and December 2018, a faster process than usual for Field Music, but one David described as "liberating" because they had less time to dwell on it. The lyrics were fact-checked by the museum for historical accuracy and fixed some errors, for which David expressed gratitude.

The arrangements were not finalised before the Brewis brothers presented them to other members of Field Music, another deviation from the former's usual procedure due to time restraints; the brothers first discussed the songs and visual elements of the performances with the band aboard a ferry while returning from a festival in Ireland. The visuals were finalised after Christmas of 2018, and revolved around a backdrop animated by Field Music's guitarist Kevin Dosdale, with collaboration from Andy Martin. Visualisations of vibrations similar to those used in "The End of the War" image were projected onto the walls as the band performed, as well as explanatory text about the stories behind individuals songs that they played. Minor changes were made to the music during rehearsals. The songs were first performed at the IWM sites in Salford and London on 24 January and 31 January 2019, respectively.

Field Music did not originally plan to compile the songs into an album, but decided to do so because they felt the music was equally as strong as their previous works. David voiced the belief that Christmas of 2018 was when he first considered the idea of an album, though Peter said the idea did not occur to him until the band actually recorded the songs shortly after the IWM performances. It marked the first time Field Music had made an album from the music that they had been commissioned by an outside party to write. David called it a surprise, and the band has jokingly referred to Making a New World as feeling like an "accidental record" as a result.

== Lyrics and themes ==
=== Individual stories ===
After accepting the commission from the IWM, David and Peter Brewis decided against making music entirely and specifically focused on World War I itself because they felt pop music was not the right vehicle for telling a broad story about such a large topic. Instead, the Brewis brothers decided to approach the project similarly to how they write their usual songs, which is by focusing upon smaller stories. David said of this: "We can't tell the story of the First World War, we certainly can't tell the story of a century after the first World War and everything that came from it, but we can pick little stories, and find ways that maybe they can express something much bigger." This approach, which Peter acknowledged was "fairly esoteric" and "niche", was partially inspired by the brothers visiting the IWM in person and seeing the many stories told there.

In writing the songs, the brothers researched stories, events, and advances that occurred during and after World War I, and picked moments over the course of the next 100 years that they could tie back as a direct or indirect effect of the war. David described the songs as an attempt to "capture the echoes of the First World War in all the time since". The songs identify technological, political, sociological, and cultural advancements over the course of the century and link them back to the World War I, demonstrating the long-standing consequences of that conflict. David said of Making a New World: "The whole album is really about consequences, and how the consequences of that war are still with us." He also said that he and Peter were surprised at the extent to which World War I influenced so much of the 20th century: "In some ways, things have changed a lot. But in some ways, we are still very much living in the world shaped by that conflict in that time." The album largely presents these stories in chronological order, starting with those immediately after the war ended, and concluding with the present day.

David and Peter each picked their own subjects to focus upon and develop into songs, and at no point did either brother object to the other's selections, which Peter attributed to a mutual trust between the two. David was the primary composer of songs such as "Best Kept Garden", "Coffee or Wine", "Do You Read Me?", "Money Is a Memory", and "Only in a Man's World", while Peter was the main composer of other songs, including "A Change of Heir", "A Shot in the Arm", "I Thought You Were Someone Else", "Nikon, Pt. 1", and "Nikon, Pt. 2". Finding and choosing the stories they liked was one of the biggest challenges of the process for the brothers. Writing songs based upon the researching of topics was a different approach than usual for Field Music, but the Brewis brothers claimed they enjoyed the change of pace. David said working on Making a New World "might be the first time we've thought of ourselves as songwriters or lyricists, rather than people who make records". David's and Peter's mother had died in March 2018, and after that, the brothers did not feel capable of writing songs inspired by their normal lives as they usually did, so David said the IWM commission was well-timed because "looking at different subjects from a different angle was ideal".

Since the songs for the album were not about the Brewis brothers or their own lives like many Field Music works, they realized they needed to identify a different storyteller and perspective for each of their songs. This approach helped ensure the songs were personal instead of overly academic. Despite the album of Making a New World, Field Music tried to avoid placing too much historical detail into the songs or writing lyrics that would require a great deal of context to understand. David said he hoped that the album would be a work listeners could enjoy on multiple levels, feeling as though they had watched "a good historical documentary" while simultaneously enjoying the music. The brothers also tried to avoid placing their personal perspectives about political or historical issues into the songs, though Peter acknowledged they may have been indirectly communicated through the lyrics.

=== End of the war ===
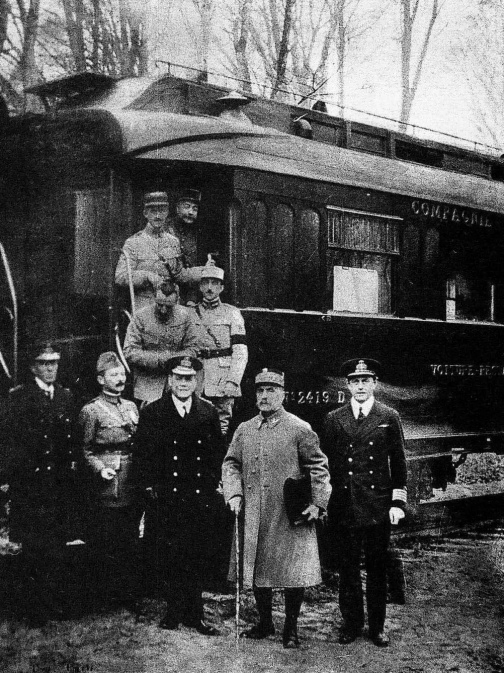
A photograph taken outside Ferdinand Foch's railway carriage in the Forest of Compiègne after agreeing upon the Armistice of 11 November 1918, which was one of the inspirations behind Field Music's song "Coffee or Wine".

Although the concept behind Making a New World is inspired by World War I, very few of the songs are explicitly about the conflict itself. None of the lyrics describe any battles or fighting, and the word "gun" is never used in the album. David said of this: "Directly, it's hardly about World War I at all." Peter said the band wanted to prevent Making a New World from seeming trite or like a "bad musical", and they did not want the songs to seem overly happy or sad, not wanting to write songs that presented certain ideas about war and peace. The Brewis brothers felt they could not write authentic songs from the perspective of a soldier, which was another reason they chose not to address the war directly. They also did not want Making a New World to be about remembrance of World War I. Peter claimed that he and David "wrote it at a time when there was a lot of remembrance going on around the First World War and we didn’t want to encroach onto that territory". Instead, David said the band wanted to "find a way to make the war and what it meant immediate". In the pamphlet for the IWM performances, he wrote: "In writing these songs, we felt we were pulling the war towards us — out of remembrance and into the everyday — into the now."

World War I is only directly addressed within the first three songs on Making a New World. The opening two songs, "Sound Ranging" and "Silence", are brief instrumental pieces that were directly inspired by the "End of the War" sound ranging image. The first song represents the sounds of artillery guns firing, while the latter depicts a sudden silence that follows the abrupt ceasing of fire.

The album's third song, "Coffee or Wine", is about both a British soldier's return home after the war, and the signing of the Armistice of 11 November 1918 aboard a train near Compiègne in France. David described it as a song that addresses the end of the war "from a position of confusion, which he called "a feeling I can get a hold of and make something authentic out of". The song is largely from the perspective of the soldier, who experiences conflicting emotions, including shock and uncertainty about returning to a post-war world. The soldier ponders whether or not there will be a place for him in society again, and if he can readjust to his family life, as reflected in the lyrics showing him wondering about his family: "Will I recognise you all? / Or have you grown away from me since I've been away so long?" The song also imagines the generals and high-ranking officers from both sides of the war gathering around a table to sign the armistice. The title "Coffee or Wine", which is also a lyric in the song, reflects the meeting's attendees asking which refreshments they should enjoy, which Field Music used to illustrate the former's detachment from the devastation caused by the war. This was partially inspired by a discovery David made in his research that Supreme Allied Commander Ferdinand Foch acted informally around his soldiers, but strongly insisted on having his meals at regular intervals, which David found to be "a very funny little detail".

=== Technological and medical advances ===
Several of the songs on Making a New World focus on technological advances that stemmed from World War I. The technologies highlighted by the album's songs are varied. "From a Dream, Into My Arms" was inspired the usage of underwater microphones to detect and sink submarines, the precursor for sonar technology which ultimately led to the development of ultrasound technology to monitor prenatal development. The lyrics are from the perspective of a mother seeing her unborn child on a monitor. David, the father of two young children at the time of Making A New World's, said the ultrasound technology and the story behind it "feels very immediate to me". The song "Do You Read Me?" was based upon the origins of air-to-ground radio communication, from the perspective of a pilot flying over battlefields in 1917 during World War I and receiving the first transmission of a human voice during a flight. David portrayed the pilot as feeling a sense of freedom in the air, and yet being "tied down by these radio transmissions from the ground". He said the fact he chose that perspective for the time reflects how much he values having time alone.

The song "A Change of Heir" was inspired by Harold Gillies, a New Zealand-born surgeon who pioneered facial cosmetic surgery and skin grafts for injured soldiers, and later conducted one of the first gender realignment operations. The song is written from the point of view of Michael Dillon, one of Gillies' first patients, who was the first trans man to undergo phalloplasty in the 1940s. Dillon's father was a baronet and it was uncertain if Dillon was entitled to inherit the baronetcy. This change inspired the title "A Change of Heir", which was a phrase used in an old newspaper headline in a story about Dillon. The title is also a pun referring to the phrase "a change of air", because Dillon eventually moved away from Great Britain to escape the attention his surgery brought him. Peter deliberately wrote the song so that it did not explicitly tell Dillon's entire story, but rather only hinted at it, to entice the listener to research it further. Several lyrics in the song refer to Dillon's surgery, including the phrase: "If the mind won't fit the body, let the body fit the mind".

The song "Only in a Man's World" is about the development of sanitary napkins and the fact that advertising for the products, created by men, often treats the concept of menstruation like something shameful that should be kept secret. The song was inspired by a Wisconsin-based company known as Kimberly-Clark that developed a material for dressing war wounds and was later adapted for the first modern sanitary product, which was called Kotex. Arunachalam Muruganantham, the Indian investor who designed machines to develop sanitary pads as a way to combat unhygienic practices around menstruation in rural India, was another inspiration for "Only in a Man's World". The song is written from a man's perspective, and reflects what David felt was a lack of understanding about the topic from men in general. He felt the discussion and advertising of sanitary pads had not changed much since the early development of the product, and David believed that would not be the case if men also experienced menstruation, as is reflected in the lyric: "Things would be different if the boys bled". David further said of the song:

I found myself researching the development of sanitary pads – not a statement I've ever imagined myself making – and was surprised at how little the advertising material has changed in a hundred years. It's still, 'Hey Ladies! Let's not mention it too loudly but here is the perfect product to keep you feeling normal WHILE THE DISGUSTING, DIRTY THING HAPPENS.' And you realise that it's a kind of madness that a monthly occurrence for billions of women – something absolutely necessary for the survival of humanity – is seen as shameful or dirty – and is taxed MORE than razor blades?!

David said somewhat embarrassed writing a song about the topic, particularly when first sharing it with his wife, but David believed "confronting my own embarrassment is a pretty fundamental part of what the song is about". He also felt embarrassed the first time he shared the song with Liz Corney from Field Music, but both David's wife and Corney approved of the song and encouraged him to release it. Several staff members of the IWM also thanked him for addressing the subject after he first performed the song there, which made David feel further validated in writing it. David described "Only in a Man's World" as a song that approaches the topic in a "light-hearted way", but his exasperation about the double standard is also reflected within some of the lyrics, including the repeated declaration "I don't know what to say".

Some of the instrumental pieces on Making a New World were also influenced by technological advances, even though they do not include vocals that reflect this. "A Common Language, Pt. 1" was inspired by French cellist Maurice Martenot, whose work as a radio telegrapher during World War I directly led to his creation of the ondes Martenot, an early electronic musical instrument. The device was a precursor for the synthesiser and was a major influence on modern electronic music. Another instrumental track, "I Thought You Were Someone Else", was inspired by a breakthrough in epidemiology following the 1918 flu pandemic. Peter felt the war's impact on the pandemic was an interesting story, but not one that was appropriate to convey in lyrics, so he limited the topic to instrumental music.

=== Social and cultural movements ===
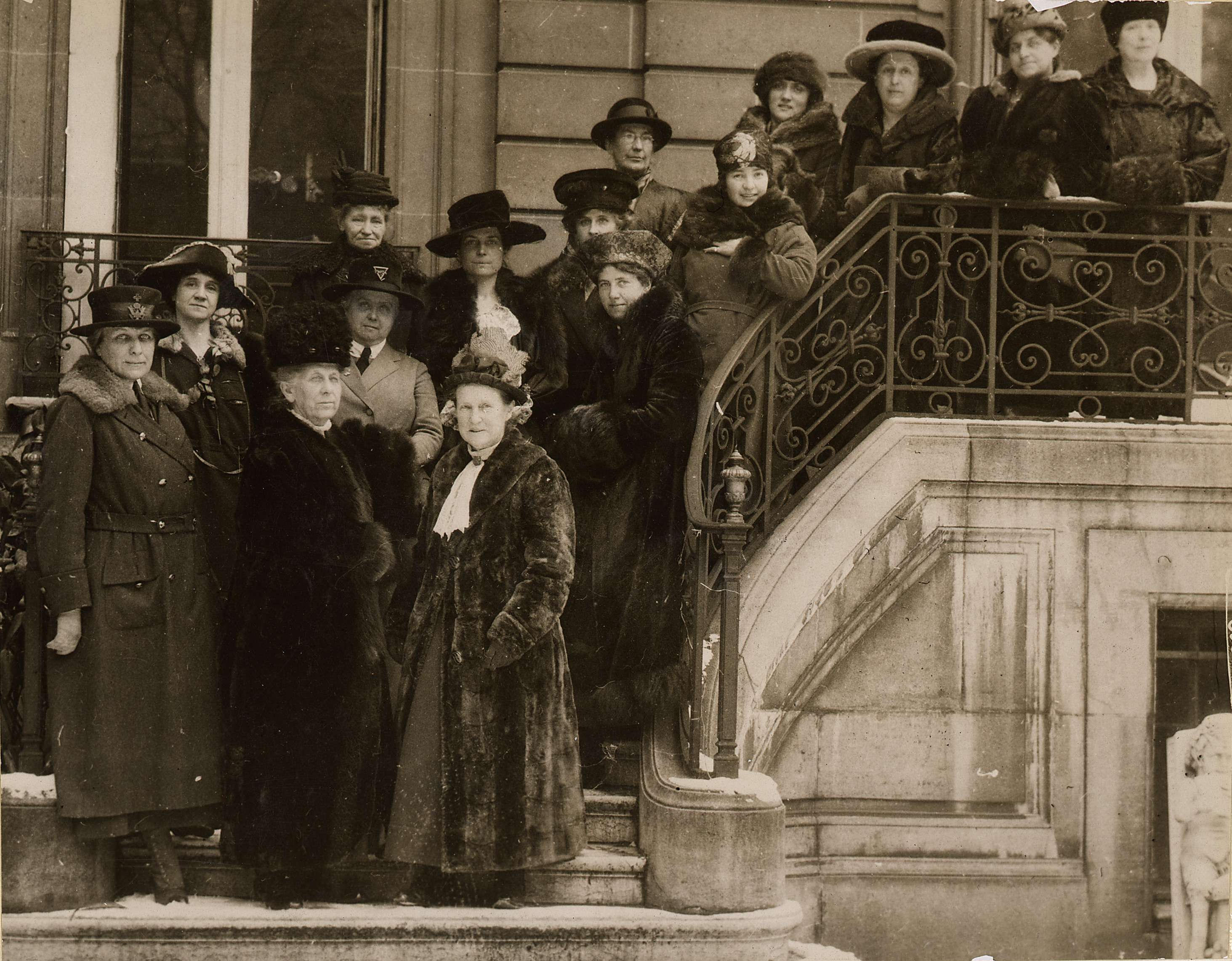
A photo of participants of the Inter-Allied Women's Conference, which was an inspiration behind Field Music's song "Beyond That of Courtesy".

Several of the songs on Making a New World are also based upon social and cultural movements that followed the conclusion of World War I. "Between Nations" addresses the futility of war and the fragility of the peace that resulted from the conflict, as well as how the Paris Peace Conference of 1919 helped lead to the formation of the United Nations. "Beyond That of Courtesy" is about the women's suffrage movement in France, with references to the Inter-Allied Women's Conference that followed World War I, the leaders of whom eventually made a presentation to the League of Nations, in the first instance of women formally participating in international negotiations. The song's repeated chorus warning against a situation in which "the recommendations have no force beyond that of courtesy" reflects an intention for suffragettes to be taken seriously as civil activists. Although not explicitly addressed in the song, Field Music used written material from their IWM performances to link the suffrage movement highlighted in the former to the elections decades later of female leaders like Sirimavo Bandaranaike and Margaret Thatcher. "Beyond That of Courtesy" also alludes to the failures of cooperation that ultimately led to the downfall of the League of Nations.

"Best Kept Garden" is a song about urban planning, and the social housing reforms made by Christopher Addison, the British Minister of Reconstruction after World War I. The subject resonated with David because his parents grew up in a housing estate established after World War II. During writing the song, he consulted a social geographer acquaintance about housing estates built as a result of the Addison Act, such as Becontree in London, and Wythenshawe in south Manchester. The lyrics of the song are from the perspective of a Becontree resident, and it was inspired by "best-kept garden competitions" organised after the war for encouraging working-class families to keep their gardens in good shape. These competitions stemmed from the government's lack of trust in residents to properly maintain the gardens, and David considered them "a slightly patronising mix of attrition good intentions". The judges in the competitions were often rent collectors, which sometimes resulted in a family in one estate hiding from a rent collector while another showed off their garden, a juxtaposition he considered illustrative of the British class system.

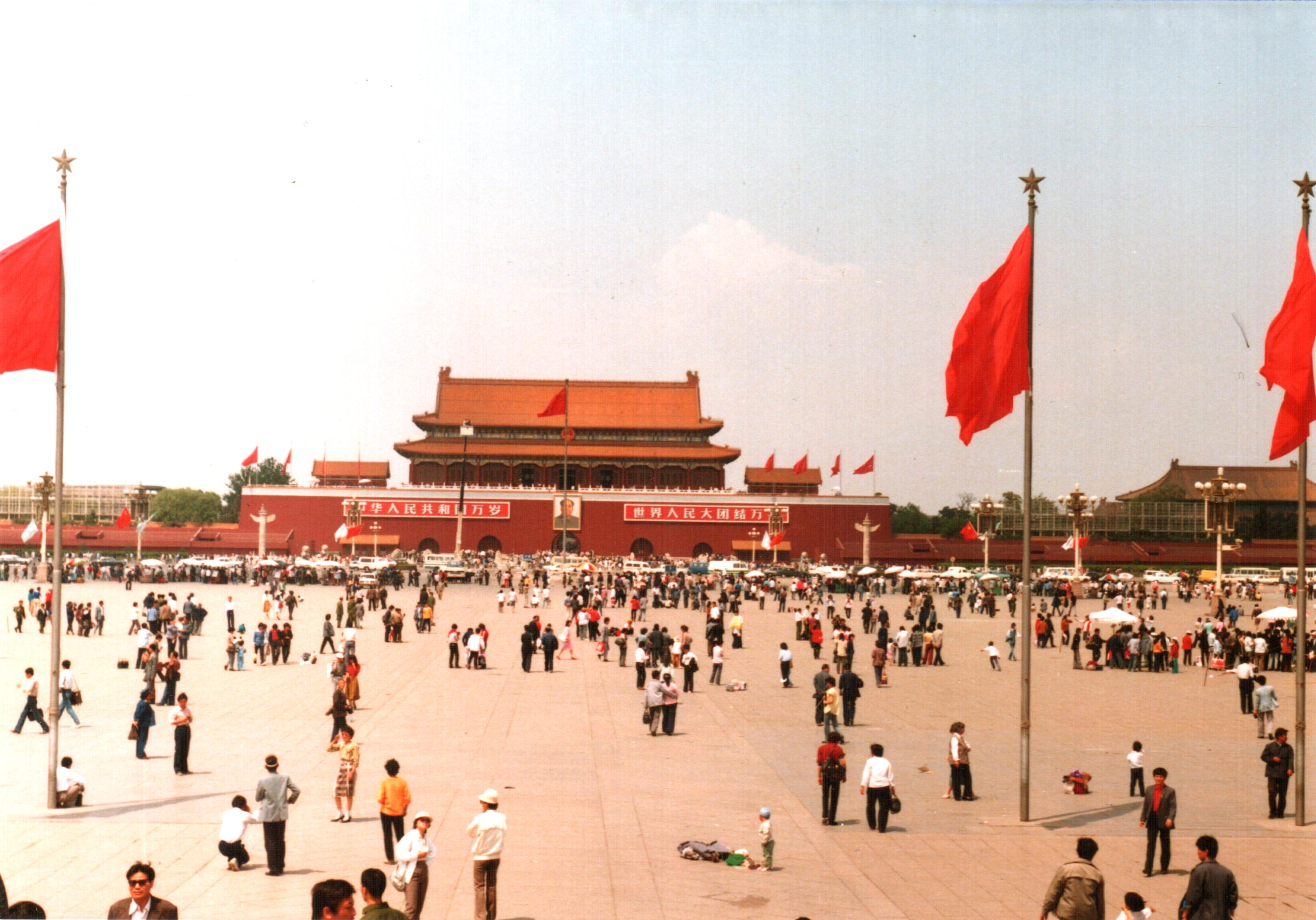
Tiananmen Square in May 1988, shortly before the 1989 Tiananmen Square protests and massacre that inspired Field Music's songs "Nikon, Pt. 1" and "Nikon, Pt. 2".

"Nikon, Pt. 1" and "Nikon, Pt. 2" were both inspired by the 1989 Tiananmen Square protests in China and particularly the lone protester known as "Tank Man", who famously stood in front of and blocked a column of tanks attempting to leave Tiananmen Square after suppressing the protests by force. Peter was inspired to write the songs after watching a documentary on BBC Radio 4 about one of the photographers who took pictures of the student protesters. "A Shot in the Arm" was inspired by the Dada movement, which began after artists in neutral Switzerland began to create art in response to World War I, and later inspired extreme examples of performance art in the 1960s. The song particularly took inspiration from Peter's reading about Chris Burden, the artist who willingly allowed himself to be shot by a friend as part of a 1971 performance piece protesting the Vietnam War. The former includes lyrics about children in a playground playing a game that sees them punch each other, which Field Music tied back to the Burden protest piece; David said the idea fighting as a game reflected a desensitisation of violence. Peter also included lyrics from a Hugo Ball poem in "A Shot in the Arm", and described them as "hidden" within the song.

The track "Money Is a Memory" concerns the final payment by Germany in 2010 of the economically ruinous reparations it owed under the Treaty of Versailles, and is written from the perspective of a functionary in the German Treasury. The Brewis brothers were surprised at how recently the final reparations payment was made and felt it would make a good song, though Peter asked David to write the track because the former did not believe he could write it himself. David described "Money Is a Memory" as "probably the most explicit example" of Making a New World's theme of World War I's consequences continuing into the present day. He wrote the lyrics from the perspective of a bureaucrat whose job was to process the paperwork for the final payment, reducing a momentous occasion like the conclusion of World War I to a routine and boring administrative task. David called this approach to the song "a bit comical", but it also reflects how such financial transactions have lasting repercussions that affect people, and serves as a commentary on how the monetary system works. David said in reference to the bureaucratic duties being portrayed in the song: "buried away inside those papers you can imagine the echoes of millions of lives being turned upside down". In a news release about the album, Field Music said of the song: "A defining, blood-spattered element of 20th century history becomes a humdrum administrative task in a 21st century bureaucracy."

=== Present day ===
Although the songs of Making a New World tell stories from various points of the 20th century following World War I, the album also presents commentary about how the consequences of the war are still relevant to present day. David said the band sought "to explain how the First World War is still with us". Stephen Thompson of NPR Music said the album "uses the past as a prism into which to view the present", and NME writer Mark Beaumont described it as "a collection of interlocking stories spanning decades, probing at the roots of the modern malaise". CJ Thorpe-Tracey of The Quietus said Making a New World "attempts to unbox and contextualise the 'now' within the history of twentieth century Britain after the end of the First World War". Exclaim! writer Kaelen Bell wrote of the album: "Perhaps it's time for a record that looks back at the past hundred years and tries to trace where it all went south."

Field Music attempted to not be judgmental or moralise with Making a New World, but also acknowledged the album has an inherently political perspective, and that their own ideological views come through in the songs. In particular, the band expresses displeasure with what they view as the world's turn towards right-wing parties and policies, as well as a prevalence of xenophobia, misogyny, and racism. When asked what the modern world can learn from World War I, David responded:

I think the main thing we learned from doing the project was that consequences are long and complicated, and that ill-thought-out solutions lead to tragedy down the line. I don't think the modern world has learned that lesson, certainly not in foreign policy. That feels even bleaker now that the UK has given up on the consensus of European peace after the Second World War. That was a hard-won peace, and here we are throwing it away in a xenophobic temper tantrum.

"An Independent State", the final track of Making a New World, most directly addresses the effects of World War I on the modern world, although it is an instrumental piece without vocals. According to Field Music and materials the band provided during its performance for the IWM, the track was inspired by how treaties and agreements after the war influenced the Middle East and other parts of the world for 100 years after the end of the conflict. Similarly to "I Thought You Were Someone Else", Field Music felt this was too large a story to adequately portray in lyrics, so they made it an instrumental song instead. Among the historical events that inspired the track was the Sykes–Picot Agreement, the Balfour Declaration, British support for the establishment of a Jewish homeland within Palestine, and the relocation of the U.S. Embassy in Israel to Jerusalem under the orders of U.S. President Donald Trump. Beaumont also suggested that the track "paints an ominous sonic portray" of the United Kingdom as isolated after a withdrawal from the European Union through Brexit.

Several other songs about specific historical events in Making a New World also touch upon how the events still resonate in the present day. David said "Only in a Man's World" has a "very direct echo" of ongoing modern-day debates about transgender rights. Likewise, he said "Beyond That of Courtesy" has a "very direct mirror image in what's happening with the European Union", and that "Best Kept Garden" has "very direct parallels" with housing crises, and opposition to social housing in the present day UK. Beaumont also argued "Money Is a Memory" uses Germany's final reparations payment to "highlight the inhuman greed of the 21st century".

== Musical style ==
=== Suite style ===
Due to the fact that the music was first written for a live performance, Making a New World is presented like one continuous suite, with songs and vignettes segueing into each other. Peter said this was done in part so audiences would not worry about whether it was appropriate to applaud between songs during the live shows. Making a New World marked Field Music's first extended suite on an album since Plumb (2012). Thorpe-Tracey said because of the way the songs are intertwined, he did not immediately realize while listening to "Coffee or Wine" that he had already reached the third track; Thorpe-Tracey praised the album's "inventive overlaying of bits and bobs". Steven Johnson of musicOMH said of Making a New World's suite arrangement: "It all forms interlocking musical blocks which when placed together still somehow seem to outline jagged, modernist architectural landscapes."

=== Mix of genres and moods ===
Making a New World features a diverse mixture of styles, genres, and instruments. The album has been described as a work of multiple genres, including indie rock, art pop, rock, pop, art rock, indie pop, progressive pop, art-prog, britpop, and alt-pop. Timothy Monger of AllMusic said it also includes elements of guitar rock, synth pop, soul, disco, and chamber pop, as well as "some light prog-rock sophistication". Several individual songs were cited by reviewers as examples of progressive music: The Scotsman's Fiona Shepherd commented on the "prog funk elasticity" of "Do You Read Me?", and "Beyond That of Courtesy" was noted as "a very catchy bit of prog pop" in a BrooklynVegan article. "Nikon, Pt. 2" has been called electronic rock, and "Best Kept Garden" has been described as "new wave", with some of reviewers comparing the latter to the work of Vampire Weekend. Hot Press writer Stephen Porzio called Making a New World an "experimental album" due to its diversity of genres and styles. Meg Berridge of Gigwise claimed the album "metamorphoses [from] ambient piano-centric ballads to high-octane, funk floor-fillers", and Stereogum writer Ryan Leas said it ranges "from tangled, nervy art-rock with some old-school new wave funk elements to jangly indie".

In addition to the variety of genres on Making a New World, there are multiple shifts in mood and tone, sometimes within individual songs themselves. Citing an example, James Anderson of NARC Magazine wrote that "Best Kept Garden" offset a buoyant guitar riff against "ethereal vocal harmonies", which was said to exemplify a "shifting mood (that) reflects the ironies of its subject matter". "Coffee or Wine" is at times breezy and bouncy in tone, and has a solemn and pastoral quality at other times. Berridge called the song both "delightfully buoyant and painfully bittersweet", writing: "If you scratch below the surface of the ebullient piano, you’ll find abandon and hopelessness in the lyrics." "Do You Read Me?" starts out fast-paced and propulsive, but slows down near the end, with a series of steady percussive beats, becoming one of the sadder and more contemplative songs of the four singles released from the album. David said the song "floats off into a reverie" at the end as it transitions into "From a Dream, Into My Arms", and David felt the segue from contemplating mortality to dreaming about birth was appropriate. Rob Mesure of musicOMH wrote that a number of the songs from Making a New World feature "melodies reflecting the optimistic as well as the darker subjects of focus".

Several of the songs include funk elements, particularly "Only in a Man's World", and "Money Is a Memory", both of which were primarily composed by David. Peter jokingly said of his brother: "You can't stop Dave getting his funk chops out. I've tried before and it's just impossible." Both songs have been compared to similar funk work by American musician Prince. David himself described "Money Is a Memory" as "a kind of slow funk stomper", and The Skinny writer Alan O'Hare viewed "Only in a Man's World" as "twitchy new wave funk", while Kieron Tyler of The Arts Desk called the latter a "snappy pop-funk nugget with an Eighties feel". Sound of Violence writer Yann Guillo said Making a New World has "a certain taste for a white funk" that Field Music previously explored on their album Open Here (2018). "Only in a Man's World" also has many disco aspects, and has been repeatedly compared to the work of Talking Heads; David said of the song, "I'd basically written a disco song about sanitary towels."

"Best Kept Garden" has been noted for its mix of styles, having been described as "dramatic pop", "industrial splendour", and "rock-classicism", while received comparisons to the works of Roxy Music, Talking Heads, and the Kinks. Both "Between Nations" and "A Change of Heir" have been called psychedelic music by reviewers, with the former being compared to the musical style of the Beach Boys, Van Dyke Parks, and Pete Townshend, and the latter to the style of "imperial-era Pink Floyd", as well as the acoustic music of the Beatles. Critics compared "Money Is a Memory" to the works of various other artists, including Godley & Creme, Peter Gabriel, and David Bowie, in his "Fame" era. Robert Ham of Paste also commented on the song's "Hot Chocolate-like R&B groove".

=== Instrumental pieces ===
Similarly to Field Music's live performance of the material at the IWM, Making a New World features several brief instrumental pieces and vignettes among the songs with vocals. NARC Magazine's Lee Hammond said the album is "peppered with short instrumentals that provide segues between poignant moments", and Matt Churchill of God is in the TV claimed the pieces "humbly majestic flow to proceedings, with each part given space to breathe and own its segment of the whole". David stated the band chose to write instrumental-only pieces because they felt some of the stories they researched were topics that felt "too big" to address with lyrics. Among the pieces were "I Thought You Were Someone Else", which is about the 1918 flu pandemic, and "An Independent State", which is about how treaties after World War I divided the Middle East. Guillo described the instrumental tracks as "short but evocative and almost cinematographic musical interludes", and noted that several of them include jazz accents.

The first two tracks of Making a New World, "Sound Ranging" and "Silence", are short instrumental songs with the intention of representing the exact moment World War I ended. The first track is a discordant piece with percussion sounds that deliberately resemble the sound of artillery fire. The song includes a combination of various musical elements and different time signatures, portraying a sense of chaos and irregularity associated with the war. Pitchfork writer Brian Howe called the song "an interesting blend of beauty and terror", and Ross Horton of The Line of Best Fit said it evokes the "contemplative, humming soundscapes" popularised by the English band Japan on Tin Drum (1981). "Silence" is a 40-second track with sparse, single piano notes, which represent the cease of artillery fire with the conclusion of the war. Reviewers described the track as surreal, gloomy, and ominious, and David said Field Music intended for the song to simultaneously convey a sense of calm and uncertainty. PopMatters writer Jordan Blum said the two opening tracks "use chaotic earthy spaciness and isolated piano contemplation, respectively, to great effect".

Other instrumental tracks on Making a New World include "I Thought You Were Something Else", "A Common Language, Pt. 1", "A Common Language, Pt. 2", and the album's closer, "An Independent State". Each of the tracks differ in style from one another. "I Thought You Were Someone Else" includes elements of jazz, and psychedelic rock, utilising piano and guitars in a minimalist style. The two "A Common Language" tracks are electronic music pieces, which Blum said incorporate "robotic digital experimentation". Churchill said the keyboard tones of "Pt. 1" are "antithetical" to the compositions around them, and that the song sounds "practically space age to the rest of the record". "An Independent State" is a dreamy and contemplative closing track, which begins with simple piano tones, but builds in intensity while adding cymbals, synthesisers, and lead guitar lines. Hammond called the song "a bleak closing track, capturing the mood of the current political climate almost too perfectly".

=== Vocals and instrumentation ===
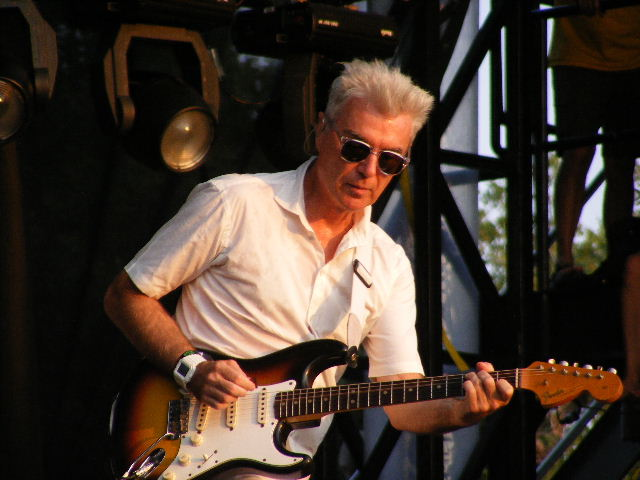
Many reviewers compared David Brewis' singing on "Only in a Man's World" to that of David Byrne (pictured) of Talking Heads.

As with many other albums by Field Music, Making a New World makes regular uses of bouncy and sophisticated vocal harmonies, which are included on songs such as "Best Kept Garden", "Beyond That of Courtesy", "Coffee or Wine", and "Do You Read Me?". Some songs on the album are semi-spoken, while others include near-falsetto vocal parts sung by David Brewis. BrooklynVegan writer Bill Pearis described the album's harmonies as "lush and lovely", and Jesse Locke of Slant Magazine wrote that Field Music's vocals "sound as effortless as always, delivered with a laidback breeziness belying the songs' sophisticated melodies". Many reviewers compared David's singing on "Only in a Man's World" to that of Talking Heads member David Byrne, (Note: Siobhán Kane of The Irish Times wrote that "Only in a Man's World" is "like David Byrne exploring the history and economics of the sanitary towel". Under the Radar writer Caleb Campbell said Field Music "does its best David Byrne impression as they take on access to menstrual products". Steven Johnson of musicOMH said David Brewis' vocals on the song position the band "closer to Talking Heads than ever before". The Line of Best Fit writer Ross Horton called the song an "amazing Speaking in Tongues-era Talking Heads homage". Ian Sinclair of Morning Star called "Only in a Man's World" the "closest you'll ever get to hearing a new Talking Heads song".) particularly when the former repeatedly sings the line "Why should a woman feel ashamed?"

Uncut writer Sharon O'Connell said Making a New World has a "dominant, switchback guitar style" that is typical of other Field Music works. Several songs feature prominent guitar riffs, including "Best Kept Garden", which Horton wrote "opens with a delightfully screwball guitar lead" that he compared to the work of Captain Beefheart. "Money Is a Memory" includes what Louder Than War writer Abigail Ward called "great sizzling guitar stabs" reminiscent of guitarist Carlos Alomar's performances on Bowie's Station to Station (1976), while O'Hare compared it to the music of David A. Stewart. Several reviewers noted the dynamic guitar parts of "Only in a Man's World", and Paste writer Hayden Goodridge said the sustained guitar strums of "Beyond That of Courtesy" create a sense of "ambient tension". Bass guitar is featured prominently on several songs, including "Between Nations", and "Beyond That of Courtesy"; Pearis described the bass parts throughout the album as "rubbery".

The piano is featured prominently too in several of Making the New World's songs, including "A Shot to the Arm", "Only in a Man's World", and "Coffee or Wine". Several critics described "Coffee or Wine" in particular as a "piano pop" song, and Blum noted the song as including "jubilant piano chords". Multiple songs on the album also include powerful and pronounced usage of drums, such as "Do You Read Me?", which Leas said has "a drumbeat that feels like a militaristic march pushing forward". "Beyond That of Courtesy" in particular includes an unusual drum rhythm, utilising claps and dings as well as traditional percussion instruments. Synthesisers are also utilised throughout Making a New World.

== Recording and production ==
Making a New World's main tracks were recorded on 1 February 2019, one day after Field Music's performance at the IWM site in London. In addition to David and Peter Brewis on drums and guitar, respectively, the recording included the full Field Music live band, including Dosdale on guitar, Andrew Lowther on bass guitar, and Corney on keyboards as well as backing vocals. The band played two real-time run-throughs over the course of a single day, without stopping, and the Brewis brothers then picked the best tracks from each of the two performances. David said the two run-throughs accounted for about "80% of what's on the record", though the brothers and Corney later did some overdubbing at Field Music's studio in Sunderland.

Making a New World was the first Field Music album completed at their new studio in Sunderland; their previous studio, located elsewhere in Sunderland, where they had recorded five consecutive albums over a course of seven years, was demolished following the completion of Open Here. The former's production was a departure for Field Music because most of the band's previous records were largely constructed in studio by David and Peter, who would then work with the other members of the band to determine how the sounds could be played live. By contrast, Field Music first learned how to play the songs from Making a New World through the live IWM performances, then recorded them as the full band later. As a result, the album was considered Field Music's first full-band release since Tones of Town (2007). David said Making a New World was built from scratch more than the band's previous works, and he said it was a strange process for Field Music to hold rehearsals in which band members did not already know in advance what they were supposed to be playing. Though David and Peter were the primary composers of the album's songs, every track is formally credited as having been written by all five members of the band.

== Release and promotion ==
The release of Making a New World for 10 January 2020 was announced on 18 September 2019, the announcement coming the same day as the release of the album's lead single, "Only in a Man's World". The second single, "Money is a Memory", was released on 20 November 2019, and a music video illustrated and animated by Heather Chambers was later released online. The third single from Making a New World, "Beyond That of Courtesy", was released 11 December of that year, and the fourth and final single, "Do You Read Me?", was released 3 January 2020. That same day, Field Music announced on Twitter they were releasing the song "in case we don't make it through the next seven days", with the 2019–20 Persian Gulf crisis ongoing at the time. Making a New World was released on 10 January 2020 in compact disc, vinyl, and digital download formats, by the Memphis Industries label. The album marked Field Music's first in two years since the release of Open Here, although the Brewis brothers had issued other solo projects since that time. David's solo project School of Language released the album 45 in 2019, the same year that Peter released You Tell Me, a collaborative album with Sarah Hayes. A special vinyl record of Making a New World with a red pressing was also released on 10 January 2020, and Field Music also performed two live tracks from the album for Soho Radio, including "Money is a Memory", which were recorded directly to a vinyl record.

Field Music embarked on a tour throughout the UK following the release of Making a New World. Most of the performances for the tour utilised similar visuals created by Dosdale and used during the original shows of the IWM, including seismograph-like images inspired by "The End of the War" sound ranging document, as well as narrative text describing the stories that inspired the songs. Although Field Music planned to perform a few of their most popular older songs during the tour dates, the suite-like nature of Making a New World meant they would largely be playing the entire album in its entirety, a concept Peter described as "terrifying". Field Music did not plan to undertake many tour dates for this reason, as well as the fact that David said they would "be sick of playing" the new songs after a while because of their limited ability to mix in other songs. The band was initially concerned about whether they would be able to transfer the IWM visuals to tour at all, and tried to pick venues that could accommodate the visuals.

Before embarking on its regular tour, Field Music gave several performances in small record stores, which created challenges in terms of regarding presenting the visuals in smaller spaces. The shows ran from 9 January to 19 January 2020, and included performances in Brighton, Bristol, Edinburgh, Liverpool, London, Manchester, and Newcastle, including the stores of Piccadilly Records and Rough Trade. The regular tour dates began on 31 January 2020 with a performance at the Brewery Arts Centre in Kendal, and extended through 29 February with stops in Leeds, London, Glasgow, Manchester, Nottingham, and Whitley Bay, at such venues as the Brudenell Social Club, and Kelvingrove Art Gallery and Museum. Separately from the tour, Field Music played songs from Making a New World at the North East of North (NEoN) Digital Arts Festival in Dundee on 9 November 2019.

== Sales ==
Making a New World reached number 35 during a mid-week update of the UK Albums Chart from the first week of its release. However, the album ultimately finished the week reaching position number 84, and remained on the chart for one week. This marked the lowest chart position for a Field Music album over the band's five studio albums in a ten-year period, dating back to Field Music (Measure) in 2010. Making a New World further opened at number 12 on the Scottish Albums Chart, where it also remained for one week.

== Critical reception ==
Professional ratings
Aggregate scores
| Source | Rating |
|---|---|
| AnyDecentMusic? | 7.3/10 |
| Metacritic | 73/100 |
Review scores
| Source | Rating |
| AllMusic | 4/5 stars |
| Evening Standard | 5/5 stars |
| Exclaim! | 6/10 |
| The Guardian | 4/5 stars |
| The Irish Times | 4/5 stars |
| musicOMH | 4/4 stars |
| NME | 2/5 stars |
| Paste | 6.4/10 |
| Pitchfork | 5.4/10 |
| Slant Magazine | 3.5/5 stars |

Making a New World was met with generally positive reviews from music critics. At Metacritic, the album received an average score of 73, based on 18 reviews. Aggregator AnyDecentMusic? gave it 7.2 out of 10, based on their assessment of the critical consensus.

Blum said the album "tackles some heavy ideas via Field Music's commonly charming, luminous, and multifaceted aesthetic", and called described it as "undoubtedly one of their best efforts". Hammon called it Field Music's most musically diverse album and "without doubt an exceptional record". O'Connell said the album was delivered with "Field Music's customary artful intelligence and funk-pop verve", and wrote that "the pair's writing/arranging smarts and the dominant, switchback guitar style are on peak form". Victoria Segal from Q described the album as "a fascinating response to war's seismic impact", adding: "By opening up these surprising echoes, Making a New World resonates with hidden meaning and lost connections." Berridge wrote: "It's safe to say that Making a New World will be a hallmark on Field Music's repertoire – an retrospective think-piece that is also enthralling to listen to."

Many reviewers described Making a New World as an ambitious album, (Note: Making a New World was described as "ambitious" in multiple outlets, including The Times, AllMusic, and Sound of Violence. Robin Hilton of NPR called it a "really ambitious album", and James F. Anderson of NARC Magazine said the album "triumphs in its ambition". Phil Mongredien of The Observer, who otherwise disliked Making a New World, acknowledged the album had an "ambitious scope". Andrew Sacher of BrooklynVegan said Field Music is "always very ambitious, and this new album is no different".) with several of them calling it Field Music's most ambitious work to date. Multiple critics praised the originality of the album, (Note: The Sydney Morning Herald writer Barnaby Smith called Making a New World "a typically imaginative and original installment" in Field Music's career. Johnson called the album "admirably niche stuff" that "excels both lyrically and musically". AllMusic writer Timothy Monger described it as "an ambitious, original, and exquisitely crafted work". Robert Ham of Paste called the album's concept "a novelistic approach to the pop album, respecting the intelligence and curiosity of Field Music fans and those lucky people that got to see this music performed live in 2018".) and others described it as a particularly niche and idiosyncratic work. (Note: Kane labelled Making a New World "a beautifully idiosyncratic piece of work". Johnson called it "admirably niche stuff" and said it "excels both lyrically and musically". Smith described the album's concept as "esoteric subject matter".) Steven Johnson wrote: "Field Music are on a seemingly never-ending run of form, generating fresh ideas at will and delivering them in accomplished fashion." Several of the favourable reviews complimented Field Music's ability to make an enjoyable and engaging album based upon such a lofty and complicated concept; (Note: Monger wrote that "the scholastic nature of this rather complex song cycle somehow makes sense in the Brewis Brothers' hands". O'Connell said few bands could make such strong songs about topics as complicated as those in Making a New World, and claimed that Field Music "deliver[s] on narrative particularity and interpretive abstraction as well as emotional resonance". Loud and Quiet writer Joe Goggins said: "It takes a band well-versed in nuance to pull off a project of this sophistication." Prasad wrote: "The pieces are nuanced, detailed and a testament to the brothers' knack for taking complex subject matter and making it both entertaining and melodically memorable.") Evening Standard writer Harry Fletcher claimed that the band's "songcraft is strong enough to support weighty themes", adding: "They've taken the unsexiest subject matter and made it sing."

Some reviewers said the album might be intimidating for listeners at first due to the unusual concept and subject matter, but that those who approached it with patience and an open mind would be rewarded. (Note: BrooklynVegan writer Bill Pearis said approaching the album "can be a little daunting" but encouraged listeners not to be intimidated because Field Music had "crafted another wonderful prog-pop album". Alan O'Hare of The Skinny wrote that Making a New World was challenging, but that "the rewards are there for those who make the time to truly engage." Muzikalia writer Juanjo Frontera said that the album initially might be difficult for the average listener, especially those accustomed to less challenging pop music, but that it is worth the effort. Yann Guillo of Sound of Violence claimed the album might take the listener some time to get used to, but it is a "treat" once they do.) Thorpe-Tracey said he was turned off by the album's concept at first, but found that Making a New World "reveals itself at a gradual pace", and proved to be rewarding after having delved into it and explored the positive qualities. He claimed that "suddenly a record that I worried would feel too long has gone by too fast". Other critics said the album would reward multiple listens; (Note: Campbell, who was otherwise critical of Making a New World, nevertheless called it "a musically creative suite that will undoubtedly reward multiple listens". daMusic writer Patrick Van Gestel wrote that the album has so much to experience that it can be listened to and enjoyed repeatedly. O'Hare said the album is rewarding for listeners who actively engage it.) Roy Wilkinson of Mojo wrote of the album: "These enigmatic narratives work well – the themes can be unearthed at one's leisure, immersed in music that's both poignant and delightful." Some writers said Making a New World is enjoyable even for listeners who are unfamiliar with or uninterested in the album's historical context, (Note: Pearis wrote: "You don’t need to be a history major to appreciate the songcraft and performances, either, ... but reading the liner notes will make it a lot more captivating." Horton said of Making a New World;: "the Brewis brothers' typically beautiful music is warmer, weirder and a little wilder than usual". He said the subject matter wouldn't turn off listeners, nor would it particularly excite history fans, adding: "Those put off by the unwieldy concept ultimately have nothing to fear – the WWI themes are completely ignorable, and so disparately connected that the only reason you’d ever know they were there was if somebody told you in advance." Jesse Locke of Slant Magazine called it an "entertaining, unpredictable listen" even for those who do not wish to follow the historical lyrics and concepts, adding: "Never has a history lesson sounded so strangely funky.") though others felt having an understanding of the concept and the stories behind the songs was helpful. (Note: Pearis said an understanding of the concept for Making a New World was not fully necessary, but that reading about it in the album's liner notes makes the listening experience more rewarding, writing: "I'm not that much of a lyrics person, to be honest, and wouldn't have known all this without some very helpful and fascinating notes that come with the album." Deutschlandfunk Kultur writer Robert Rotifer called the album deeply moving, but said reading about the historical background of the lyrics made it more enjoyable. Ham said the songs work well without knowing the historical details, but the additional context gives a more complete understanding of the work.)

Multiple reviewers called Making a New World a well-constructed album from a musical and stylistic standpoint; (Note: Matt Churchill of God is in the TV called Making a New World a "wonderfully constructed album" and stated the variety of instrumentation throughout its running time "makes for vibrant listening". Zara Hedderman of Raidió Teilifís Éireann said the album "takes some of the elements across [Field Music's] whole discography" and includes "so many different things and styles and influences here, which is really great and varied". Sinclair described the album as "a suite of experimental, edgy and deeply engaging songs". Guillo called it "a musical and narrative kaleidoscope".) Monger labelled it an "exquisitely crafted work, full of rich details and compelling songs that translate the past into modern new shapes", and Caleb Campbell of Under the Radar, who was otherwise critical of the album, described it as "a thoughtfully crafted album with an unconventional art-rock style". The continuous, suite-like nature of the songs also drew praise from some reviewers. (Note: Van Gestel said the segues between songs made Making a New World feel like one continuous track, constantly engaging the listener. Campbell claimed the album "resembles a rambling walk through scenes of 20th century Britain, all backed by artful progressive pop". Anderson described it as "one continuous, breath-taking composition".) A handful of writers who reviewed the album positively nevertheless believed it was unlikely to bring Field Music a great deal of commercial success or widespread recognition: The Sydney Morning Herald writer Barnaby Smith said "such esoteric subject matter is unlikely to change their fortunes", and Will Hodgkinson of The Times wrote that the album "was unlikely to give Ed Sheeran sleepless nights, but it is rewarding and involving nonetheless".

Not all reviews were positive. Some critics felt an album was not the right platform for Making a New World's concept, and that the concept did not translate well from its roots in a live performance. Ham said the album had a studious approach which resulted in a stiffness to it, and he felt more sentiment would have helped it feel less like a research project. Howe felt the album had good ideas, but the medium did not lend itself to such complex topics as women's suffrage, skin grafts for injured soldiers, and menstruation; he wrote: "Who listens to pop music and thinks about stuff like this? How do they do it?" Some critics disliked the album's concept altogether. (Note: Campbell called the concept unwieldy and wrote that "the central lyrical concept of the album does fall a bit flat, and the message of the album as a whole comes off muddled". Bell said Making a New World attempts to "explore a disorienting number of ideas from a confusingly indistinct POV" and "it feels like a project stretched beyond its means". Brian Howe of Pitchfork wrote: "The album's fussy construction, with lots of small instrumentals and half-songs, is tiresome. By the end, it’s hard to remember much of what happened.") Bell said the album "buckles under its conceptual framework almost immediately" and "the idea is too wide-ranging and unruly to be conceptually cohesive", while Howe wrote: "There's a familiar, overriding sense of a couple of guys reading something about history and having a lot to report."

Some reviewers felt Making a New World had too many ideas and narrative elements to form a cohesive album, (Note: Porzio, who was generally complimentary of Making a New World, said it feels "at times feels messy – a jumble of disparate lyrical ideas and sounds" and is "patchy in parts". Campbell wrote: "Sadly, the topics here are too diverse to produce much of an emotional effect as a whole." DIY writer Rhys Buchanan said the album had some great songs, but overall, it "does feel slightly hard to grasp due to its disjointed nature". Mike Evans of The Citizens' Voice felt it "gets bogged down by directionless instrumental bits and clumsy patches of historical poetry set to music".) while others felt that the concept was strong but the songs themselves were lacking. Beaumont said the album had a "jumbled, ADHD approach" and that the "ideas are far more interesting than their execution", while Phil Mongredien from The Observer wrote: "Such is the ambitious scope of the concept [that] the individual songs can seem like an afterthought, eclipsed by the weight of all that they're trying to say." Some writers, even those who reviewed the album positively overall, felt the concept was pretentious or self-indulgent. (Note: Hot Press writer Stephen Porzio said the concept of Making a New World was "pretentious sounding on paper", but was well-executed, describing it as "an ode to creativity". Eamon Sweeney of Raidió Teilifís Éireann was complimentary of the album, but still called it unusual and pretentious. Evans felt parts of the album sounded "self-indulgent or half-baked", and wrote: "The set ends up a stern reminder that prog rock bands can sometimes take themselves far too seriously.") Making a New World drew several comparisons to PJ Harvey's Let England Shake, another war-inspired concept album, though Sharon O'Connell said Making a New World is "more tightly bound to its content" than Harvey's album.

=== Accolades ===
Making a New World was Under the Radar's first "Album of the Week" of 2020, and the magazine also included "Only in a Man's World" and "Money is a Memory" among its "Best Songs of the Week" when they were released in September and November 2019, respectively. The NPR program All Songs Considered included the album in its list of the top seven albums out the week of its release, and Making a New World also made Paste's list of "10 New Albums to Stream Today" that same week.

== Track listing ==
Although the songs on Making a New World were primarily composed by Peter and David Brewis, all tracks were credited as having been written by all five members of Field Music.

Making a New World track listing
| No. | Title | Length |
|---|---|---|
| 1. | "Sound Ranging" | 0:56 |
| 2. | "Silence" | 0:40 |
| 3. | "Coffee or Wine" | 3:03 |
| 4. | "Best Kept Garden" | 2:54 |
| 5. | "I Thought You Were Something Else" | 1:12 |
| 6. | "Between Nations" | 4:05 |
| 7. | "A Change of Heir" | 2:39 |
| 8. | "Do You Read Me?" | 4:20 |
| 9. | "From a Dream, Into My Arms" | 1:20 |
| 10. | "Beyond That of Courtesy" | 2:13 |
| 11. | "A Shot to the Arm" | 2:32 |
| 12. | "A Common Language, Pt. 1" | 2:01 |
| 13. | "A Common Language, Pt. 2" | 0:32 |
| 14. | "Nikon, Pt. 1" | 2:34 |
| 15. | "Nikon, Pt. 2" | 0:54 |
| 16. | "If the Wind Blows Towards the Hospital" | 1:27 |
| 17. | "Only in a Man's World" | 2:46 |
| 18. | "Money Is a Memory" | 3:33 |
| 19. | "An Independent State" | 2:40 |
| Total length: | | 42:21 |

== Personnel ==
Credits adapted from AllMusic.

Musicians

- David Brewis – vocals, drums, programming
- Peter Brewis – vocals, guitar, programming
- Liz Corney – vocals, organ, piano
- Kevin Dosdale – guitar
- Andrew Lowther – bass guitar

Technical personnel

- Kevin Dosdale – animation, layout
- Andy Martin – photography

== Charts ==
| Chart (2020) | Peak position |
|---|---|
| Scottish Albums (Official Charts) | 12 |
| UK Albums (Official Charts) | 84 |
