= Open Here =

2018 album by English rock band Field Music

Studio album by Field Music
- Released: 2 February 2018
- Genres: Indie rock; alternative rock; chamber pop; progressive pop; art rock
- Length: 39:13
- Label: Memphis Industries

Field Music chronology
Commontime (2016)	Open Here (2018)	Making a New World (2020)

Singles from Open Here
- 1. "Count It Up" Released: 28 November 2017; 2. "Time in Joy" Released: 10 January 2018; 3. "Share a Pillow" Released: 24 January 2018

Open Here is the sixth studio album by the English rock band Field Music. Released by Memphis Industries on 2 February 2018, the album combines elements of alternative rock and chamber pop, and includes a wider range of musical instruments than previous Field Music albums, predominantly featuring flutes, horns, and string instruments. The band attempted to create a unique instrumental combination for each song; Field Music's David and Peter Brewis felt more confident about expanding the range of instruments on the album, after having made a film soundtrack with an orchestra just before the recording of Open Here began.

Open Here is more overtly political in its themes than Field Music's previous albums, with many of the songs inspired by David and Peter Brewis' frustration with the result of the Brexit referendum vote. Songs like "Goodbye to the Country" and "Count It Up", the latter of which focuses on societal privileges enjoyed by white members of the middle- and upper-class, directly address Brexit; David Brewis described them as "definitely the angriest songs I have ever written". Other songs were inspired by David and Peter Brewis' children and the responsibilities of parenting, including "No King No Princess", which speaks out against social conceptions of femininity and masculinity.

Despite occasionally serious or cynical topics, Field Music attempted to infuse a sense of optimism and fun within Open Here; the opening track "Time in Joy", in particular, was described by Peter Brewis as an effort to confront difficult times "with a deliberate sense of fun". Open Here was the last of five consecutive albums Field Music recorded at their home studio in Sunderland, which was to be demolished shortly after the album was completed. Field Music involved a large number of guest musicians in recording the album, including saxophonist Pete Fraser, trumpeter Simon Dennis, flutist Sarah Hayes, and singer Liz Corney of The Cornshed Sisters, as well as the band's usual string quartet.

"Count It Up" was the first single from Open Here, and a music video was released for the song. Additional singles included "Time in Joy" and "Share a Pillow". The album received positive reviews, and appeared on several year-end lists of the best albums of 2018. Several reviewers compared Open Here to the work of such artists as David Bowie, Talking Heads, Steely Dan, Prince, Peter Gabriel, and XTC.

== Background ==
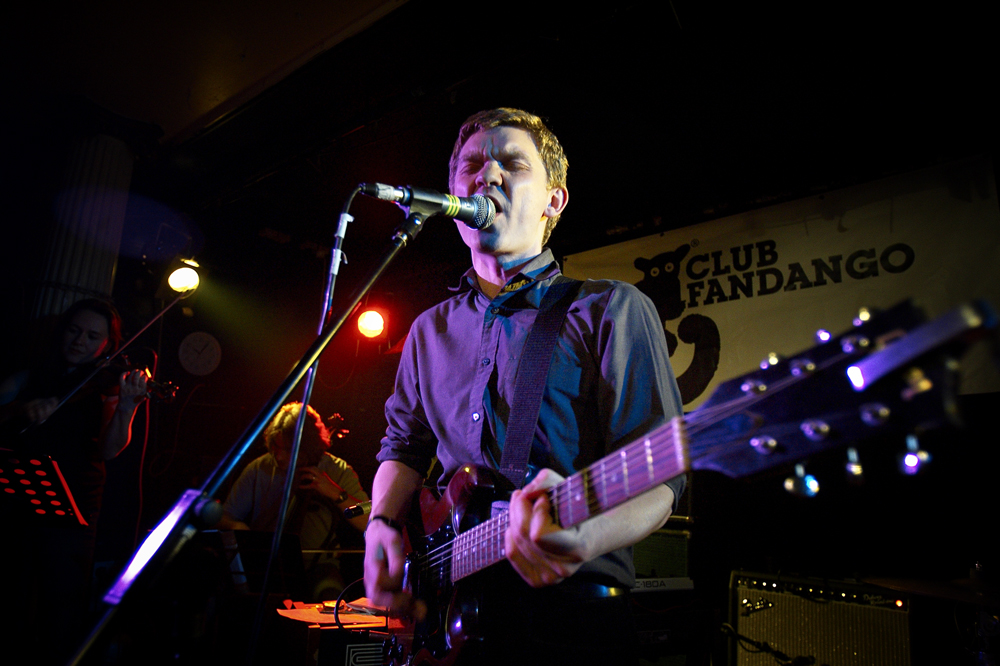
Peter Brewis, one half of the rock band Field Music, which also includes his brother David.

Open Here is the sixth studio album by Field Music, the English rock band consisting of the brothers David and Peter Brewis. A follow-up to their 2016 album Commontime, it was released through their label Memphis Industries. In a press release, David Brewis said: "Where Commontime felt like a distillation of all of the elements that make up Field Music, [Open Here] feels like an expansion; as if we're pushing in every direction at once to see how far we can go." The news release also described the album as "bigger in scale, and grander than anything Field Music have done before", and compared it to the works of pop experimentalists from the late 1970s and early 1980s, including Godley & Creme, XTC, and Todd Rundgren. Peter Brewis said the title Open Here was "kind of a joke" revolving around the idea of the album as a packaged consumer commodity, since pre-packaged products often have the phrase "open here" on them.

== Musical style and composition ==
"Time in Joy"
"Time in Joy" begins with minimal piano and synthesizer elements, which build into an erratic funk-like groove with circular staccato flute parts.

"Count It Up"
A toy keyboard was used in the recording of "Count It Up", which also makes prominent use of drum machines and synthesizers.

"Open Here"
"Open Here" is primarily guided by violins, with the string quartet playing in a minuet style.

Open Here combines elements of alternative rock and chamber pop in the usual style of Field Music, which includes complicated chords, complex instrumentation, powerful drumming, and idiosyncratic but emotional lyrics. The album also includes the type of 1980s-style pop flourishes the band utilised in Commontime, further enhanced by arrangements featuring flutes, string instruments, and horns. Although Field Music has included these instruments in past works, they were used to a much larger extent in Open Here than in previous albums. Between work on Commontime and Open Here, Field Music collaborated with the band Warm Digits and the Northern Symphonia to make the soundtrack for the film Asunder as part of the 14–18 NOW series of events to commemorate the centenary of World War I. Peter Brewis said that working with the full orchestra on that project gave Field Music more confidence in expanding the range of instruments in their own arrangements, inspiring them to use more wind instruments in addition to their usual string quartet. He said the band sought to create an album that was concise and coherent, but also going in multiple musical directions at the same time.

Open Here has been described as a work of multiple genres, including indie rock, progressive pop, and art rock. Peter Brewis said Field Music wanted Open Here to be "a varied but coherent album as a whole", and that they tried to create a unique instrumental combination for each song. For example, "Time in Joy" predominantly features a flute and guitar, "Count It Up" uses a keyboard and drum machine, and "No King No Princess" utilizes guitars and brass instruments. The final song, "Find a Way to Keep Me", includes all of the instruments featured throughout the album, so that it would, according to Peter, "be the link between all these songs". Peter said that when working on the songs, he would make recordings of instrumental ideas, and separately take notes for possible lyrics, before combining the two later.

The opening track "Time in Joy" begins with breath-like rhythms, with minimal piano and synthesizer elements, which gradually build into an erratic funk-like groove with circular staccato flute parts, (Note: A DIY article described "Time in Joy" as "exploding into a funk-laden groove complete with flutes". Peter Helman of Stereogum says the song moves into "an erratic groove accentuated by spiraling flutes". The Irish Times writer Dean Van Nguyen describes the song's flute parts as "fluttering". Steven Johnson of musicOMH says the song "burst[s] into life with its wavering flute". The Independent writer Andy Gill mentions the song's "playful staccato flutes".) a buoyant bassline, (Note: A DIY article described the song's "buoyant, malleable basslines". Peter Helman of Stereogum called it a "rubbery bassline". A Mor.bo article describes the bassline as "sticky". Andrea Murgia of Sentireascoltare compares the bassline to those of musician Tony Levin.) and clattering triangles and bells, becoming what Michael Rancic of Uproxx describes as a "colourful, weightless melody" with string instruments supporting the vocal lines. The Independent music critic Andy Gill said "Time in Joy" sets the general tone for the entirety of Open Here, and called the song "a frothy, blissed-out ode to companionship wrapped in cascading flutes". Kelsey J. Waite of The A.V. Club said "Time in Joy" and "Count It Up", in particular, illustrate the influences of 1980s synth-pop on Field Music and Open Here.

The composition of "Count It Up" began when David Brewis played a riff on his son's toy keyboard while his son shouted numbers in the background. The toy keyboard was used to record portions of the song, which Peter Brewis said "is probably why musically it sounds a bit silly, really". David's son did not like when other people used his keyboard, so they had to do it without his knowledge. "Count It Up" makes prominent use of drum machines, synthesizers, and keyboards, in a funk-like style, with a loose conversational vocal delivery typical of David Brewis's singing. "Count It Up" was one of the first songs Field Music has done that has no guitars at all. "Share a Pillow" utilizes loud fast-paced horn sections, driven by a blustering baritone saxophone, which plays between vocal parts layered with harmonies. Peter Brewis said the song's drumbeat was inspired by the one from the Billy Joel song "Uptown Girl".

"No King No Princess" features scratchy guitar riffs and jagged drum loops, with loud and vibrant blasts from horn instruments, and vocals by Liz Corney from the band The Cornshed Sisters. Despite the wide array of instruments featured in Open Here, the guitar is still prevalent in many songs. "Goodbye to the Country" includes what Steven Johnson of musicOMH described as "wiggly, elastic guitar lines", and The Irish News writer Dean Van Nguyen said "Checking on a Message" showcases Field Music's "ability to wrangle a swinging rhythm from a guitar". "Cameraman", meanwhile, makes greater use of string quartets, with deep sustained notes from the stringed instruments, as well as a sparse piano chord, complementing what Nguyen described as "George of the Jungle-style drums".

Songs like "Open Here", "Daylight Saving", and "Find a Way To Keep Me" include some of the album's most prominent uses of string instruments. The title track is primarily guided by violins, with the string quartet playing in a minuet style. The arrangement was partially inspired by a string quartet Peter Brewis heard during a performance of Kate Bush's song "Cloudbusting", during a celebration of Bush's music organised by Emma Pollock. John Murphy of musicOMH called "Open Here" "a gorgeously atmospheric number, starting with some Eleanor Rigby-style strings before developing into a masterful orchestral pop song". The song "Daylight Saving" includes pizzicato-style strings coupled with soft rock grooves and powerful drumming, before concluding with a sustained major chord. The album closes with "Find a Way to Keep Me", which is built around a delicate piano melody and gradually adds a string section, trumpets, flutes, and a vocal choir, all of which build to a boisterous crescendo of strings and harmonies. Paul Brown of Drowned in Sound called it a "staggeringly beautiful slow-burner", while Anna Alger of Exclaim! said it "provides a larger-than-life closer to the album, with a euphoria to it". Memphis Industries described the song as "the grandest music the brothers have ever made".

== Lyrics and themes ==
=== Brexit and social privilege ===
The two years since Commontime have been strange and turbulent. If you thought the world made some kind of sense, you may have questioned yourself a few times in the past two years. And that questioning, that erosion of faith – in people, in institutions, in shared experience – runs through every song on the new Field Music album.

— Memphis Industries

According to the album's official description by label Memphis Industries, Open Here is in part about the erosion of faith in people, institutions, and shared experiences in response to events from the past two years before the album's release. Open Here is more overtly political in its themes than any of Field Music's previous albums, with many of the songs directly addressing David and Peter Brewis' frustration with the result of the Brexit referendum vote. (Note: The A.V. Club writer Kelsey J. Waite wrote: "Fresh off the Brexit vote, the Sunderland natives wrote the album as a means to connect with others and push themselves creatively in this time of increasing isolation and uncertainty." Bill Pearis of BrooklynVegan wrote, "Brexit and the U.S. election inform the lyrics". Steven Johnson of musicOMH said Open Here is the most overly political of Field Music's works and that the album "addresses the Brexit referendum result". Sentireascoltare writer Andrea Murgia called Open Here Field Music's "political manifesto" and a direct response to the political events from the two years before the album's release, including Brexit. Alberto Campo of Il Giornale della Musica said Open Here "obviously" reflects upon the Brexit referendum vote and its after-effects.) They are from Sunderland, the first district to declare its support for Brexit, much to the anger and disappointment of the Brewis brothers. Peter Brewis has said, of the two brothers, David felt the most strongly about Brexit during the making of the album; David got "incredibly angry" about Brexit, whereas Peter himself got "a little bit sad". However, both brothers took notes about Brexit throughout the referendum process, and after reviewing them, decided to write songs about the subject because Peter said "we couldn't ignore what was happening".

The lyrics of the song "Checking on a Message" depict staying up late to follow the news of political events – including the Brexit referendum results and the U.S. presidential election of Donald Trump – then awaking the next morning in disbelief to messages describing the result and after-effects; the line "hoping that it isn't true" is repeated throughout. Peter Brewis said the song was about overconfidence that world events will go the expected way, and the subsequent disappointment when they do not. The song was inspired by his own experience following election results, saying: "I went to bed thinking, 'Yeah, it's going to be fine, of course it's going to be fine,' and then it wasn't. I couldn't believe it. I couldn't believe the messages I was getting and I thought to myself that it was me being stupid, and that's the problem." Memphis Industries wrote that the song "could be on the apocalyptic party playlist the morning after any number of recent voting catastrophes". The lyrics of the song "Cameraman" depict an attempt to document troubling times, as well as observing comfortable urban life from an outside perspective. Peter Brewis said of the song: "It's about examining this slightly Utopian world that we get to live in from a position of someone who doesn't have that privilege. To them, all this must seem like another planet, a mad dream." The song "Front of House" is about saying goodbye to a deceased friend, while the title track "Open Here" is about a group of old friends who were once in a position of local prominence, but are no longer.

David Brewis described "Goodbye to the Country" and "Count it Up" as "definitely the angriest songs I have ever written", adding: "I am quite proud that I have managed to make them into listenable songs and I am sure that anger will resonate with some people." Peter Brewis said he does not believe David could have written "Count It Up" if not for Brexit. "Goodbye to the Country" is a critique of capitalism in the United Kingdom and the post-Brexit Tory-controlled government. The lyrics angrily condemn the prioritization of capitalist greed and riches over people, particularly the line: "I'm sure it'll be good fun making money at your kids' expense." The song also condemns the racism and xenophobia that was prevalent during and after the Brexit referendum process.

"Count It Up" is even more pointed in its criticism of post-Brexit Britain, going through a list one-by-one of societal privileges enjoyed and exploited by white members of the middle- and upper-class, (Note: AllMusic reviewer Tim Sendra wrote: "The stop-start synth pop song "Count It Up" details all the advantages middle-class white guys have had – and continue to exploit." John Freeman of The Quietus said: "'Count It Up' checks off a list of privileges for those unwilling to express any empathy for the less fortunate." Drowned in Sound writer Paul Brown says the song "bullet-point[s] the things most of us consider to be basic life entitlements like clean water, freedom of expression or a lack of day to day discrimination". John Murphy of musicOMH said: "It's pretty much a list song, ticking off a selection of privileges that people take for granted." ShadowProof reviewer Kevin Gosztola wrote: "A litany of privileges, which predominantly white upper and middle class males enjoy, are rattled off.") including clean water, freedom of expression, and safety from day-to-day discrimination, among others. (Note: Both Paste writer Matthew Oshinsky, John Murphy of musicOMH, and ShadowProof reviewer Kevin Gosztola all highlighted the specific "Count It Up" lyric, "If you can go through day to day without the fear of violence". Oshinsky and Gosztola also referenced the lyric, "If people don't stare at you in the street because of the color of your skin". Paul Brown of Drowned in Sound cites the song's references to "clean water, freedom of expression, or a lack of day to day discrimination".) The song is a critique of racism, privilege, the wealth gap, and the anti-immigration and nationalistic impulses that arose during Brexit. It displays empathy for marginalised citizens, including refugees. David Brewis said the song is "about the ways built-in advantages can make us feel like the world is more of a meritocracy than it is", and how people, particularly those on the political right wing, "tend to ascribe their fortunes entirely in the frame of their own talents" without acknowledging these advantages. David said he wrote "Count It Up" to express frustration with his compatriots' failure to see or think beyond themselves, and their unwillingness to express empathy for the less fortunate. He intended for the song to urge those types of people to "[look] beyond your own experience".

David's perspective about privilege in "Count It Up" was partially inspired by his reading of Making Globalization Work (2006) by Nobel Prize laureate Joseph Stiglitz. David acknowledged that people of all political persuasions, and even himself, are guilty of this: "After I'd written lots of things for it, I did think most of these could apply to me. But if you're going to write finger-pointing songs, it's best if you can point the finger at yourself as well." Anti-immigration protests in the United States and the U.S. travel ban supported by President Donald Trump, which David characterised as a "Muslim ban", were also influences for the song. It also condemns materialism, with one lyric noting: "Pounds and pennies aren't the only kind of capital." David said he "wrote tons and tons of lyrics" as he was writing "Count It Up", and "it comes out in an emotional burst". He has described the song as "a howl of rage set to what's basically my version of 'Material Girl'".

=== Parenthood and gender roles ===
Several songs were inspired by David and Peter Brewis' children and the responsibilities of parenting. In press materials released about the album, the Brewis brothers said fatherhood helped inspire a new sense of personal and political accountability in their music. Peter Brewis said that, although their children were alive during the recording of Commontime and influenced that album, the songs on Open Here touch upon parenthood in a more substantial way: "Commontime was probably just whinging about us being tired all the time, whereas this album is us talking about our little mates and how they have affected our view of world events." Though many of the songs on Open Here are about global events, Peter said: "I couldn't have written them at all without thinking of them through the eyes of my son." Pitchfork reviewer Olivia Horn wrote: "While more than a dozen artists left their fingerprints on Field Music's sixth album, the people whose presence is most felt throughout its eleven tracks are nowhere to be found in the album credits – they're David's and Peter's young children." Sean Harper of Clash believed the album shows signs of the Brewis brothers' "anxieties about introducing someone to a world as fickle and shallow as ours". The lyrics to the album's closing song, "Find a Way to Keep Me", depict a child potentially becoming separated from his or her parents. Peter Brewis said that scenario would have been upsetting to him even before he was a father, but those emotions are even more heightened as a parent.

"No King No Princess" takes a position against gender stereotyping and rigidly defined social conceptions of femininity and masculinity. (Note: Steven Johnson of musicOMH wrote that "No King No Princess" was "dedicated to the promotion of gender-neutrality". The Quietus writer John Freeman said the song "rails against gender stereotyping". Pitchfork reviewer Olivia Horn called the song "an indictment of traditional gender roles". Anna Alger of Exclaim quotes David Brewis as saying the song was partially inspired by "the personality traits that people ascribe [to his children's] gender, rather than the millions of other factors that shape a child's personality at that age".) It was inspired by the birth of David Brewis' daughter, and the different reactions and expectations he observed from people to both his daughter and son. David said both were inquisitive babies in similar ways, and he noticed people would attribute it to gender for his daughter, but never did so about his son. "It's the idea that your gender says more about you than your character would. It's so bizarre. ... How people respond to their character traits seems to be entirely due to their gender." In particular, David said he finds "princess" a strange nickname for little girls because "it's such a passive aspiration". The song highlights the ways in which gender roles are enforced on children from a young age, and takes particular note of how these gender divisions manifest in the traditional colour of clothing for children. The lyrics of "No King No Princess" feature a parent directly encouraging a daughter that she can do what she wants, dress and play how she wants, and have whatever job she wants, regardless of societal expectations. David said he was not necessarily trying to push for gender neutrality, but rather to encourage children to develop their own personalities and interests on their own.

Other songs on Open Here were also inspired by the Brewis' brothers experiences with fatherhood. "Share a Pillow", written by Peter Brewis, was inspired by his son leaving his own bedroom and attempting to sleep in Peter's bed with him. Some of the excuses his son voiced directly inspired lyrics in the song, such as "It's too late to go back to bed" and "It's fine dad, we can share a pillow". Peter Brewis deliberately wrote "Share a Pillow" so it was not too specifically or overtly clear what it was about. As a result, at least one music reviewer mistakenly believed it was about having sex with multiple different partners. "Daylight Saving" was also influenced by parenthood. The song is about two exhausted parents of new children dreaming about eventually recapturing quality time with each other, as exemplified by the lyric: "We might get it back ... not now, not yet."

=== Joy and optimism ===
Despite everything that was going on in the world, we were determined to have fun making the record. The point really is to face these horrible things and use music as a joyous thing and as an incantation to face these feelings and to fight it.

— Peter Brewis

Despite the political and social commentary prevalent on many songs in Open Here, several reviewers have noted that the album nevertheless maintains a sense of optimism and fun, and that many of the songs are musically upbeat even as the lyrics address serious or cynical topics. (Note: The Irish Times writer Dean Van Nguyen said "Open Here is not all serious stuff", citing "Share a Pillow" and "Time in Joy" as more positive and optimistic songs. Eugenie Johnson of The Skinny wrote: "It's a record that's thematically dark, but a desire to create something positive and upbeat becomes the driving force behind the LP." Record Collector reviewer Oregano Rathbone wrote "the most recurrent motif on Open Here is a determined sense of realistic, measured positivity". Paul Brown of Drowned in Sound said "It's probably not surprising that these testing times should see Field Music in a fairly serious mood at times, but they manage to wrap their most substantial motifs around typically playful pop." Pitchfork reviewer Olivia Horn said despite the album's serious content, "Open Here sets aside plenty of time for play.") Memphis Industries' official description of the album notes that, despite the strange and turbulent circumstances that have influenced the album, "there's no gloom here. For Peter and David Brewis, playing together in their small riverside studio has been a joyful exorcism." Peter Brewis said the album title itself, Open Here, was a joke because "We did not want things to be too gloomy, so we tried to give the title a little fun." He also said Field Music strove to write about serious topics like Brexit and social privilege while still maintaining a sense of humour: "I think the whole spirit of the album is to try to have fun in dark times; trying to be defiant about all the shit that's going on." He added: "We tried to make a record where the songs were like spells to get rid of some of those things."

Olivia Horn of Pitchfork said "Checking on a Message" is "deceptively peppy" for a song about Brexit. John Murphy of musicOMH called "Find a Way to Keep Me" a particularly uplifting song from a musicality perspective, despite the dark subject matter, and added: "After the political storm of the previous half-hour, this is the closing calm." Record Collector writer Oregano Rathbone believed Open Here has a sense of optimism, despite some of the cynical subject matter and political commentary. He wrote, "The most recurrent motif on Open Here is a determined sense of realistic, measured positivity", and said of "Checking on a Message" in particular: "Its 12/8 swagger admirably refuses to have its spirit utterly crushed and irrevocably broken." Paul Brown of Drowned in Sound said that the album covers serious topics but "wrap their most substantial motifs around typically playful pop". Likewise, Sean Harper wrote that the album shows Field Music are "not content with wallowing in the state of things and [want] to inspire positive change".

In particular, Peter Brewis described the opening track "Time in Joy" as an attempt to confront dark times "with a deliberate sense of fun". According to Memphis Industries, the song "turns dark times into sparkling funk". The song pushes back against the idea that painful or dark feelings are the most meaningful. In contrast, Brewis said: "I've been through dark times [and] I find that there isn't a lot of romance in that, that I function better and get more meaning out of positive experiences." Brewis said "Time in Joy" embodies "fun in the face of hardship" as well as "a kind of defiance in playfulness", both in the context of personal experience and wider national events. The band tried to embrace this idea while making Open Here itself, according to Brewis: "We set out to have a good time making this record, in spite of everything."

== Recording and production ==
The studio became a sanctuary away from everything political and personal, a cocoon of creativity. And conversely, making the album became an alternative way to connect to people, with a wide array of musicians invited to leave their mark.

— Memphis Industries

David and Peter Brewis recorded Open Here in their home studio in the Wearside area of Sunderland, working mostly with friends and colleagues. It was the last of five consecutive albums Field Music recorded over seven years at the studio, which was located on a light industrial estate in Sunderland overlooking the River Wear. However, in early 2017, it was announced that the studio was to be demolished shortly after the completion of Open Here. The band knew of the demolition plans for the studio well in advance of the formal announcement, and were only able to obtain the space because it was scheduled for demolition. Having a limited amount of time to finish Open Here gave the project a sense of urgency. Peter Brewis believed that deadline ultimately helped the recording process, resulting in a looser and less inhibited album: "I think we let the performances kind of run and we let some, almost, mistakes creep in. There doesn't sound like there's a lot of mistakes in there though."

Field Music wanted to involve as many guest musicians as possible because of the impending demolition of the studio, and Peter Brewis said the fact that the studio was closing helped attract musicians to participate. The recording process included Field Music's regular string quartet of Ed Cross, Ele Leckie, Jo Montgomery, and Chrissie Slater, as well as guest appearances by saxophonist Pete Fraser, trumpeter Simon Dennis, flutist Sarah Hayes, and singer Liz Corney of The Cornshed Sisters. Fraser previously performed the saxophone part for Field Music's 2015 single "The Noisy Days Are Over", Hayes had performed for Field Music's Asunder soundtrack, and Corney had previously performed with Field Music on tour following the release of Commontime. The various collaborators made suggestions during the recording process, many of which were accepted by Field Music, particularly flute and saxophone parts that Peter said he would not have considered otherwise.

== Release ==
The forthcoming release of Open Here was first announced on 7 November 2017, during which the band also announced its upcoming schedule for 2018 concerts in the United Kingdom. A one-minute promotional teaser video was released that included animated versions of the album cover artwork, with instrumental portions of the song "Time in Joy" playing in the background. "Count It Up" was the first single from the album, released on 28 November 2017, followed by "Time in Joy", which was first released to the online music magazine Stereogum on 10 January 2018. The third and final single was "Share a Pillow", which was released on 24 January 2018. Open Here released on 2 February 2018, through Memphis Industries.

On 15 February 2018, Field Music released an official music video for the song "Count It Up". It was directed by Andy Martin and shot in David and Peter Brewis' hometown of Sunderland. In the video, the Brewis brothers walk and drive through the streets of Sunderland while lip-syncing the song. Though they had considered shooting in parts of Sunderland that were affluent or poor, they ultimately decided "the most interesting locations were the ones that had been up and down, and sometimes were up and down at the same time; derelict factories that used to be the economic centre of the city or former shipyards that had been turned into apartments or business parks".

Field Music embarked on a tour of the U.K. in support of Open Here, which ran from 2 February to 25 May 2018. The tour began with two nights at the Northern Stage in Newcastle upon Tyne, and included stops in Amsterdam, Antwerp Birmingham, Brighton Bristol, Exeter, Glasgow, Liverpool, London, Manchester, Nottingham, Norwich, Paris, Sheffield, and Southampton. Sarah Hayes and Pete Fraser joined them for most of the tour dates. Peter Brewis said the idea of touring with an orchestra was partially modelled after a Van Morrison tour with the Caledonia Soul Orchestra, which included a string quartet, as well as horn and woodwind instruments.

== Critical reception ==
Professional ratings
Aggregate scores
Source	Rating
Metacritic	81/100
Review scores
Source	Rating
AllMusic	4.5/5 stars
Clash	8/10
Drowned in Sound	9/10
The Guardian	4/5 stars
The Independent	3/5 stars
The Irish Times	4/5 stars
MusicOMH	4/4 stars
NME	3/5 stars
Pitchfork	7.2/10
Record Collector	5/5 stars

Open Here received positive reviews, with an aggregated Metacritic rating of 81/100, which the website characterised as "universal acclaim".

The album was praised by several reviewers, with Record Collector and AllMusic calling it one of the best albums of the year, and AllMusic arguing that it stood with Field Music's best work. The album was included on Junkee's list of "2018 Albums That Deserved More Love", where it was described as the band's most ambitious effort to date due to its art-rock compositions and new-wave grooves. Drowned in Sound writer Paul Brown singled out "Count It Up" as one of the best songs released in recent years, and complimented the Brewis brothers for constantly creating fresh material. Other reviews agreed that it was a milestone for the band, with intelligent songs that went in unexpected directions, and Pitchfork suggested that it was the influence of David and Peter Brewis' children that gave the album a new sense of earnest direction. The Quietus was also positive, calling it Field Music's most expansive and brightest album to date, adding: "Amongst the carnage, Field Music have created a magical musical bubble. Anger has rarely sounded so positive."

Several critics complimented the technical aspects of Open Here, describing it as well-crafted and stylistically diverse, praising its experimentation and wide range of instruments. Eugenie Johnson of The Skinny described Open Here as one of Field Music's boldest albums, with a more open sound than the distilled, compartmentalised approach of Commontime. Some reviewers highlighted the complexity of particular songs; Uproxx called the song "Time in Joy" a "six minute explosion of unbridled pop perfection". Other reviews focused on the political themes at the heart of Open Here, saying it demonstrated the band's mastery for addressing the political and the personal simultaneously. For some critics it was Field Music's most purposeful album both in terms of message and scope, yet was still enjoyable to the common listener; Juan Edgardo Rodriguez of No Ripcord said: "There's a lot of joy to be had in the Brewis's calm and sophisticated protest." Some of the songs were described as a direct confrontation of privilege and a condemnation of bigotry in the era of Brexit and Trump.

Other reviewers felt Open Here was too challenging or contained too many ideas, even as they complimented individual aspects of the album. A review in The Independent described Open Here as "like the oddball offspring of Prince and The Left Banke". Dean Van Nguyen of The Irish Times said the album was charming and at times beautiful, but that some of the arrangements felt cobbled together, as if the sum of the parts could collapse. Mark Beaumont of NME, who mostly liked the album, also called it disjointed and oblique at times, and warned that only fans of art-pop would enjoy it.

Open Here made several year-end lists of the best albums of 2018, including No. 15 on musicOMH, No. 22 on Mojo, No. 52 on PopMatters, No. 78 on Under the Radar, and No. 86 on Rough Trade Shops. It was also included in AllMusic's year-end round-up of the best music of 2018. Multiple reviewers compared Open Here to the work of David Bowie, (Note: Dean Van Nguyen of The Irish Times compared "Goodbye to the Country" to Bowie's Berlin Trilogy, while several writers found "Share a Pillow" reminiscent of Bowie. John Murphy of musicOMH compared it to Bowie's Young Americans period, Drowned in Sound writer Paul Brown said it "brilliantly channels" "Beauty and the Beast", and Dave Simpson of The Guardian compared it to Bowie's "Fame" era. Kevin Gosztola said Open Here shares sonic similarities to Bowie's Scary Monsters (and Super Creeps) (1980).) Talking Heads, Steely Dan, Peter Gabriel, Prince, and XTC. Peter Brewis said he had repeatedly heard about comparisons to Steely Dan, but at the time that Open Here was made, he had only ever heard the band's Greatest Hits album and he did not consider them a major influence on Field Music. Bill Pearis of BrooklynVegan drew parallels between "Count it Up" and the early 1980s work of XTC and Bill Nelson, while Junkee writer David James Young compared it to the band Split Enz, calling it "the single greatest Split Enz song that they never wrote".

== Track listing ==
All songs on Open Here were credited as having been written by David and Peter Brewis.

No.	Title	Length
1.	"Time in Joy"	6:19
2.	"Count It Up"	3:42
3.	"Front of House"	1:45
4.	"Share a Pillow"	2:54
5.	"Open Here"	2:19
6.	"Goodbye to the Country"	2:26
7.	"Checking on a Message"	3:20
8.	"No King No Princess"	3:39
9.	"Cameraman"	3:41
10.	"Daylight Saving"	3:37
11.	"Find a Way to Keep Me"	5:31

== Personnel ==
Field Music

- David Brewis – vocals, composer, engineer
- Peter Brewis – vocals, composer, engineer

Additional musicians

- Jennie Brewis – vocals
- Liz Corney – vocals
- Ed Cross – violin
- Simon Dennis – flugelhorn, trumpet
- Sarah Hayes – flute, piccolo
- Pete Fraser – saxophone
- Ele Leckie – cello
- Andrew Lowther – vocals
- Josephine Montgomery – violin
- Andrew Moore – piano
- Marie Nixon – vocals
- Chrissie Slater – viola
- Cath Stephens – vocals

Technical personnel

- Kev Dosdale – layout

== Charts ==
Sales chart performance for Open Here
Chart (2018)	Peak position
Belgian Albums (Ultratop Flanders)	190
UK Albums (Official Charts)	30
