= List of music schools in the United Kingdom =

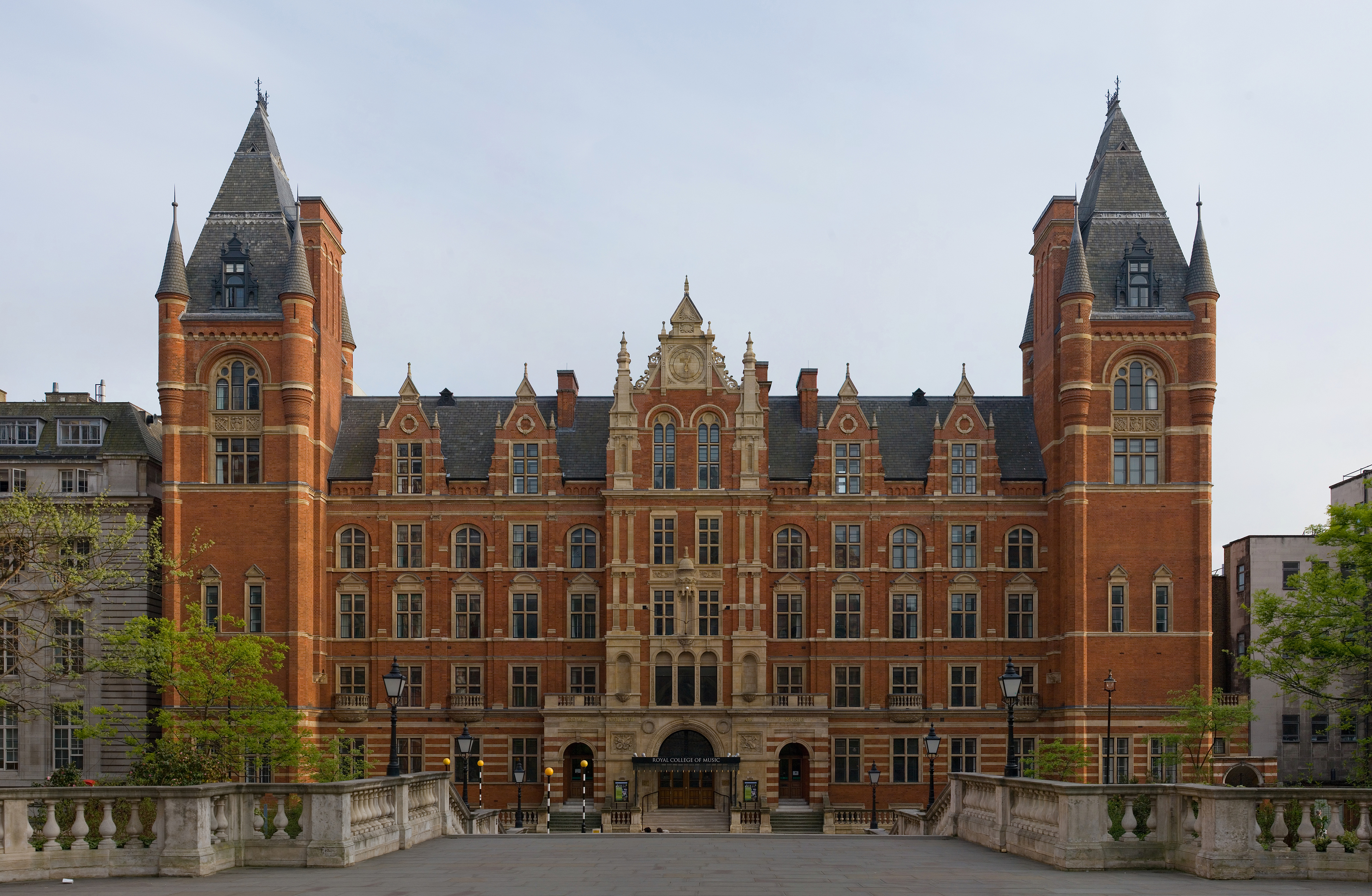
The front facade of the Royal College of Music

This list of music schools in the United Kingdom includes all tertiary level conservatoires, vocational music schools and specialist music schools for school-aged children.

== England ==
Name	Location	Age group	Founded
Birmingham Ormiston Academy	Birmingham	14-19	2011
Chetham's School of Music	Manchester	8-18	1969
The Purcell School for Young Musicians	Bushey	9-18	1962
Yehudi Menuhin School	Stoke d'Abernon	8-19	1963
Wells Cathedral School	Wells, Somerset	3-18	909
Royal College of Music	London	Tertiary	1883
Royal Academy of Music	London	Tertiary	1822
Guildhall School of Music and Drama	London	Tertiary	1880
The Prebendal School	Chichester	3-13	1100
Trinity Laban Conservatoire of Music and Dance	London	Tertiary	1872
Royal Northern College of Music	Manchester	Tertiary	1893
Royal Birmingham Conservatoire	Birmingham	Tertiary	1886
Leeds Conservatoire	Leeds	Tertiary	1965
London College of Creative Media	London	Tertiary	2002

== Scotland ==
Name	Location	Age range	Established
Army School of Bagpipe Music and Highland Drumming	Edinburgh		1910
Aberdeen City Music School, Dyce Academy	Aberdeen	S1-6	
City of Edinburgh Music School	Edinburgh		1980
Music School of Douglas Academy	Milngavie, Glasgow	S1-6	1979
North East of Scotland Music School	Aberdeen		1975
Royal Conservatoire of Scotland	Glasgow	Tertiary	1845
St Mary's Music School	Edinburgh	9-19	1880

== Wales ==
Name	Location	Age rage	Established
Royal Welsh College of Music & Drama	Cardiff	Tertiary	1949
Cardiff University School of Music	Cardiff	Tertiary	1883
Wales International Academy of Voice	Lampeter	Tertiary	2007
