= Martyn Bennett (disambiguation) =

Martyn Bennett (1971–2005) was a Scottish musician.

Martyn Bennett may also refer to:

- Martyn Bennett (album), by the above artist
- Martyn Bennett (footballer) (born 1961), English footballer

== See also ==
- Martin Bennett, Australian inorganic chemist
