= Hallaig =

Coordinates: 57.373°N 6.010°W

Hallaig is the most recognized poem of Sorley MacLean, an important Scottish poet of the 20th century. After writing it, MacLean rose to fame in the English-speaking world. It was originally written in Scottish Gaelic since the author was born on the island of Raasay, where Scottish Gaelic was the everyday language. During the course of time the poem has been translated into both English and Lowland Scots. A recent translation (2002) was made by Seamus Heaney, an Irish Nobel Prize winner.

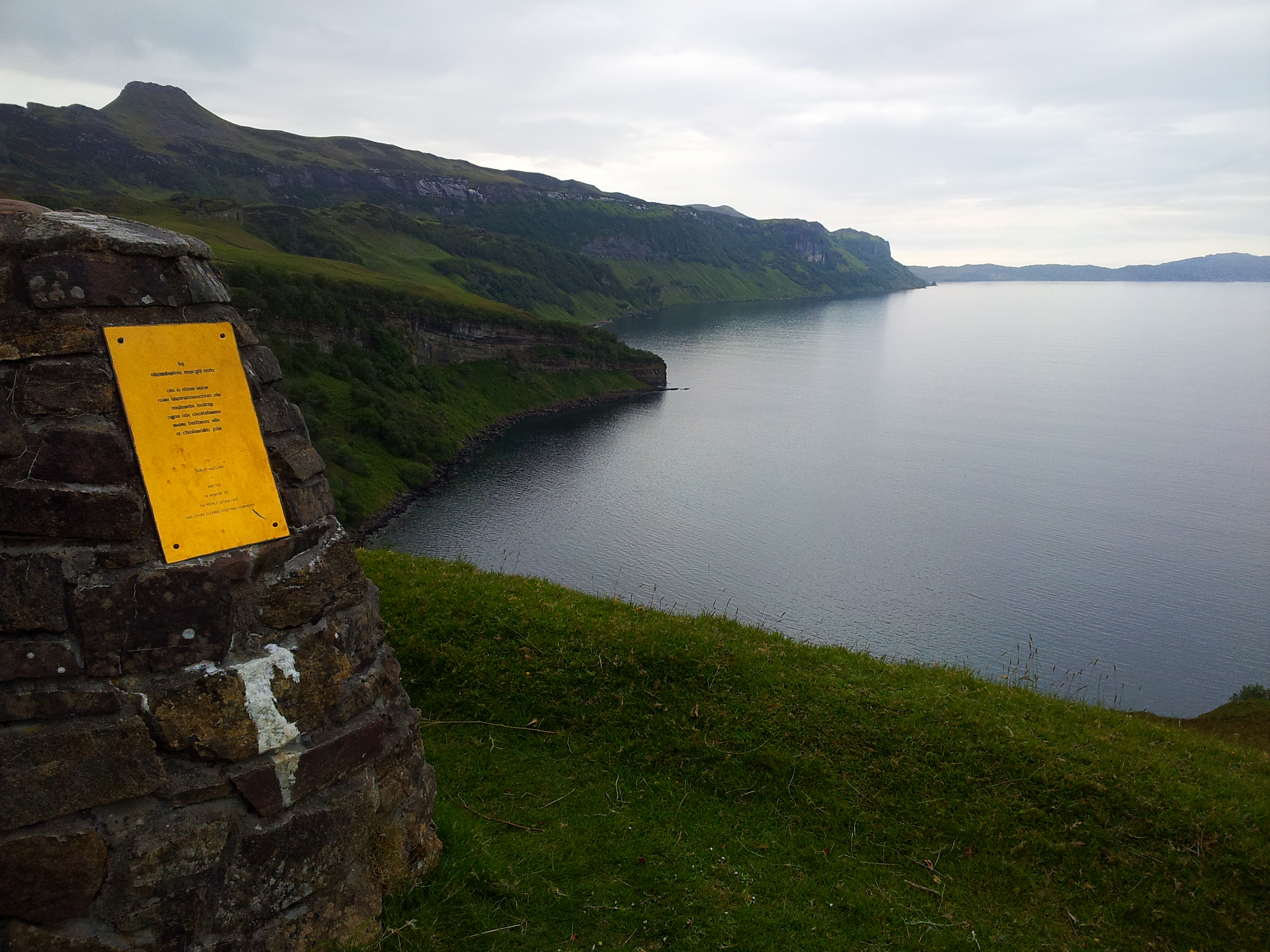
Hallaig

== Background ==
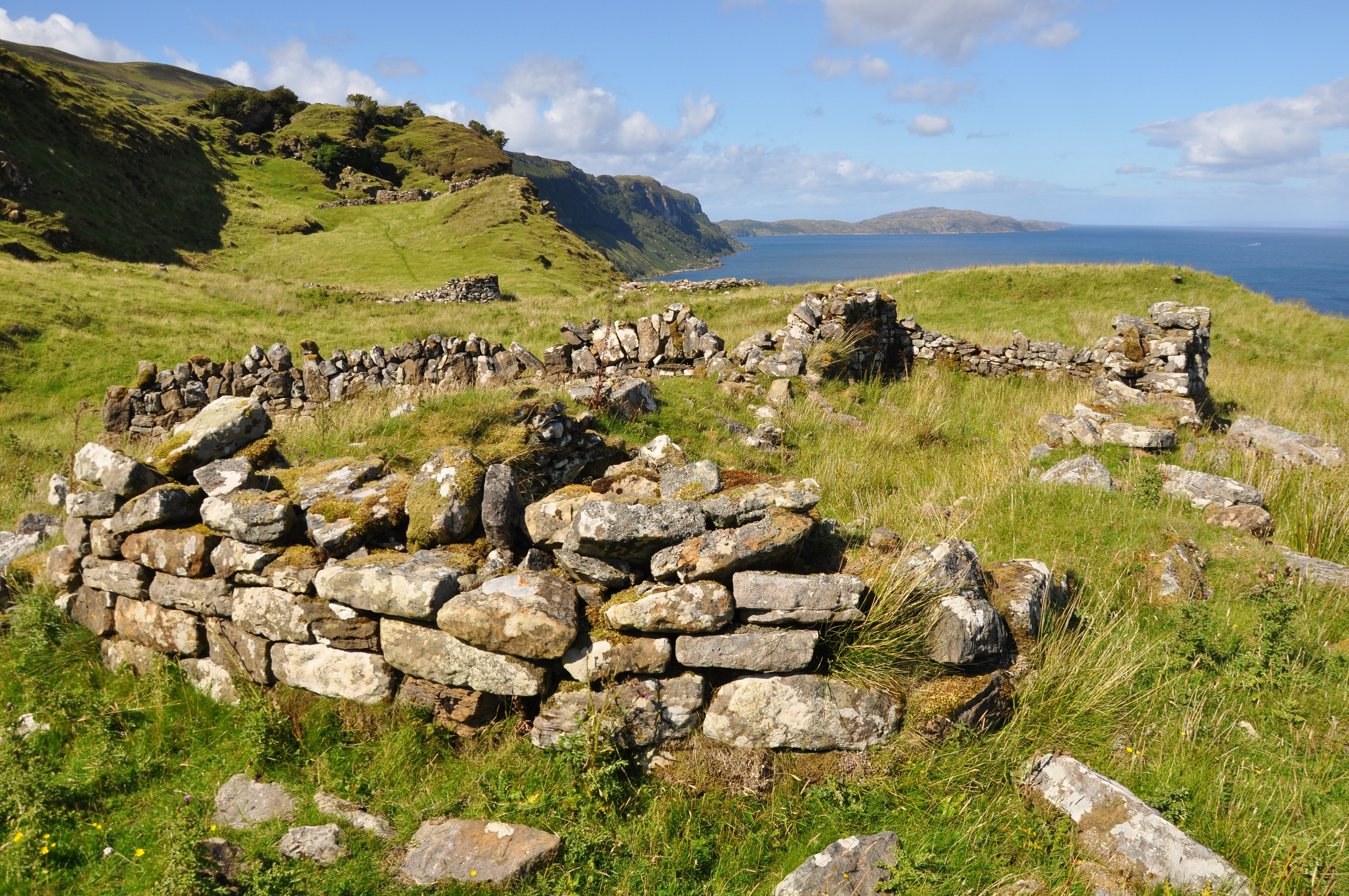
Two views of the ruins of Hallaig

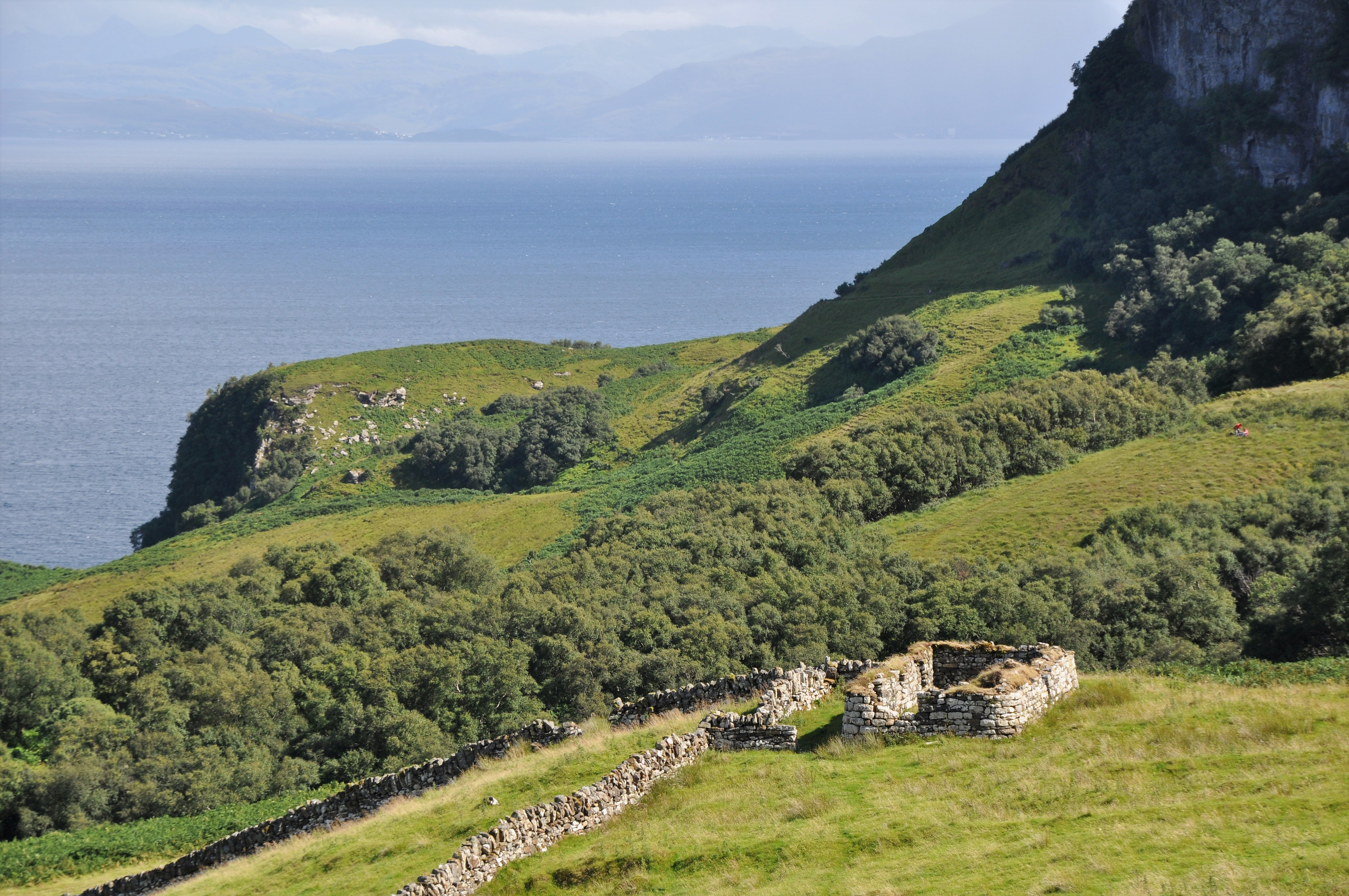

The poem is named after a deserted township located on the south-eastern corner of the Hebridean island of Raasay, the poet's birthplace. Along with much of Raasay, the crofting settlement of Hallaig was depopulated between 1852 and 1854 by landowner George Rainy. MacLean's relatives were affected, and the author decided to evoke the community of this abandoned village in his poem. It is a reflection on the nature of time and the historical impact of the Highland Clearances leaving an empty landscape populated only by the ghosts of the evicted and those forced to emigrate.

Hallaig was written in Edinburgh about 100 years after depopulation of the Isle of Raasay and was originally published in the Gaelic-language magazine Gairm.

The poem is notable for its deployment of imagery of nature, and in this respect is redolent of Duncan Ban MacIntyre's Beinn Dorain, particularly in its references to woodlands and deer.

== Cultural influences ==
Hallaig is incorporated in the lyrics of The Jacobite Rising, an opera by Peter Maxwell Davies, and can be heard read by MacLean, as part of the song "Hallaig" on Martyn Bennett's album Bothy Culture.

MacLean talked extensively about the poem in Timothy Neat's documentary for RTÉ, Hallaig: the Poetry and Landscape of Sorley MacLean in 1984, for example he analyzed how much traditional Gaelic song influenced him.

The poem inspired an organ work by William Sweeney called " Hallaig 12' " commissioned for the inaugural concert of the Flentrop Organ in Dunblane Cathedral.

The name MV Hallaig was chosen for Caledonian MacBrayne's first hybrid-powered vehicle ferry, launched in December 2012, now serving the Sconser to Raasay route.

== Analysis ==
Analyzing the English version (translated by MacLean himself) it is possible to notice that he used the first person narration and this technique enables the audience to share the emotions of the author.

"The window is nailed and boarded / Through which I saw the West / And my love is at the Burn of Hallaig, / A birch tree,"

The timeframe is uncertain as MacLean uses different tenses to mix past and present. According to the analysis of the BBC, "the birch tree depicts something alive but also rooted in the nature and history of the place."

Also, they add that "MacLean's love is both compared to a tree and personified as a woman or girl. It could refer to his love of the place and the people (...) or it could be a specific woman he admires and feels love for."

"She is a birch, a hazel, / A straight, slender young rowan."

MacLean establishes also a relation between people and nature, suggesting that they are one and the same and the pine trees plantations are related with artificial landscapes:

"They are not the wood I love"

In the following line the narrator shows his suffering when he realizes that his people are dead and the village they left behind is empty, that makes the audience share his pain. However, it is still very hard for him to accept it because of his denialism of what happened.

"They are still in Hallaig... The dead have been seen alive."

== See also ==
- Sorley MacLean
