= Mackay's Memoirs =

Studio album by Martyn Bennett
- Released: 15 April 2005
- Recorded: 2005
- Genre: Celtic fusion, classical
- Length: 20:17
- Label: City of Edinburgh Music School
- Producer: Various

Martyn Bennett chronology
Grit (2003)	Mackay's Memoirs (2005)	Love and Loss (2008)

Professional ratings
Review scores
Source	Rating
AllMusic	link

Mackay's Memoirs is the last recorded work by Scottish Celtic fusion artist Martyn Bennett. It was released on 15 April 2005 by the City of Edinburgh Music School.

It is the recording of a piece commissioned for the opening of the Scottish Parliament on 1 July 1999 and is performed by the City of Edinburgh Music School Chamber Orchestra, conducted by Susan Emslie.

The composition for pipes, clarsach and orchestra was written in honour of the late Dr. Kenneth A Mackay of Badenoch after Bennett read Mackay's medical and personal journals written during his post as Free Church of Scotland missionary general practitioner in Moyobamba, Peru. The composition is based on the theme and first variation of the piobaireachd "Lament For Mary MacLeod" and opens with Psalm 121 and features the pipes, voices, clarsach and the classical orchestra.

It was recorded on the morning after Bennett's death on 31 January 2005 by the young people of Broughton High School who were unaware that he had died, the news being kept back until recording was over.

== Track listing ==
1. "Mackay's Memoirs" – 14:19
2. "Mackay's Memoirs (Dolphin Boy Remix)" – 5:58
