= Love and Loss =

Studio album by Martyn Bennett & Margaret Bennett
- Released: 15 April 2008
- Recorded: 1999–2008
- Genre: Traditional
- Length: 12:48
- Label: Grace Note Publications
- Producer: Martyn Bennett

Martyn Bennett & Margaret Bennett chronology
Mackay's Memoirs (2005)	Love and Loss (2008)	AYE (2012)

Love and Loss, more fully known as Love and Loss: Remembering Martyn Bennett in Scotland's Music, is an EP length release of recordings made by Martyn Bennett in association with his mother Margaret Bennett.

== Recording ==
It was released in 2008 in memory of Martyn Bennett, who had died three years before. Fhir an Fhuilt Dhuinn, were Gaelic verse lyrics composed by Martyn's grandmother Peigi Stiùbhart, to go with the traditional lament Cumha na Cloinne. These were written in response to Margaret singing Cumha na Cloinne on Phil Cunningham's Scotland's Music programme in 2007.

Proceeds from the recording went to the Martyn Bennett Memorial Scholarship Fund at the Royal Conservatoire of Scotland.

== Track listing ==
1. Fhir an Fhuilt Dhuinn - Margaret Bennett featuring Cameron Drummond
2. Laddie Lie Near Me - Martyn Bennett & Margaret Bennett (recorded 2000)
3. Cumha Iain Gairbh - Martyn Bennett (recorded 1999)
