= Bothy Culture =

Studio album by Martyn Bennett
- Released: 20 October 1997
- Recorded: 1997
- Genres: Celtic fusion, world, dance
- Length: 58:24
- Label: Rykodisc
- Producer: Martyn Bennett

Martyn Bennett chronology
Martyn Bennett (1996)	Bothy Culture (1997)	Hardland (2000)

Bothy Culture is the second studio album by the Scottish Celtic fusion artist Martyn Bennett, released in October 1997 (with a US release date in January 1998) on the Rykodisc label. After winning critical acclaim for his debut album Martyn Bennett (1996), Bothy Culture builds upon that album's mixing of Scottish Celtic music with farther, international folk music styles and contemporary electronic music. The album celebrates and draws upon the music of Bennett's native Gaeldom as well as the music of Islam and Scandinavia, with Bennett finding and emotionally connecting to the similarities between the geographically dispersed styles. It mixes the styles with contemporary electronic music such as breakbeat and drum and bass.

Named for the traditional party culture of Highland bothies, which Bennett related to modern club music subcultures, Bothy Culture was released to critical acclaim, with critics praising the effectiveness of the album's unique blend of disparate styles. Bennett formed the band Cuillin, consisting of himself, his wife and two other musicians, to tour in promotion of the album. Several critics have gone on to regard Bothy Culture as a groundbreaking and pioneering album that established Bennett as a prominent musician within the evolution of Scottish music, and Bennett went on to win the Glenfiddich Spirit of Scotland Award for Music. In 2018, 13 years after Bennett's death, his friend, composer Greg Lawson, hosted the much publicised show Bothy Culture and Beyond at the SSE Hydro, Glasgow, with his GRIT Orchestra, to celebrate the album's 20th anniversary.

== Background ==
Martyn Bennett, already a Celtic musician, having grown up within Scottish Gaelic culture and learning to play the fiddle and piano, became influenced by the electronic dance music scene of the early 1990s and began regularly attending clubs, soon working Martin Swan's Mouth Music project, combining traditional Gaelic songs and music with contemporary instruments. He made his debut at the Glasgow Royal Concert Hall on 14 January 1994 supporting them. His debut album Martyn Bennet (1996), released on the Edinburgh-based indie label Eclectic, was recorded in just seven days. The album had a large impact on Scottish music, and Bennett become one of a leading group of Scottish artists, others including Peatbog Faeries, Tartan Amoebas and Shooglenifty, who pioneered an "electro-ethnic-worldbeat" genre in which Scottish Celtic music was mixed with other folk influences from Europe and further afield like Asia, South America, Jamaica and Africa, and with contemporary music, especially electronic music.

The Los Angeles Times lauded Bennett's "capitvating form of multi-culturalism," while the Toronto Sun noted the mixing of Gaelic jigs, Turkish bagpipes and Penjabi melodies with synthesizers and drum machines in his music. After its release, he provided the live musical score for David Harrower’s play Knives in Hens, and after writing scores for stage and television, he went on tour to America, supporting Wolfstone, soon also playing at Edinburgh Hogmanay events in 1995 and 1996, performing to more than 90,000 people. It was with these events that his second album Bothy Culture started to piece together. More-so than his debut album, Bothy Culture developed as a result of his experiences of the early 1990s Glaswegian rave and house scenes and his experimentation with numerous types of world music. It was recorded solely by Bennett within his home studio. Compared to his debut album, Bennett described Bothy Culture as "less of a kind of virtuosic performance. It's a simpler kind of collage in a way. I think it's more complex and mature as well. The first album is full of testosterone."

== Composition ==
=== Inspiration and themes ===
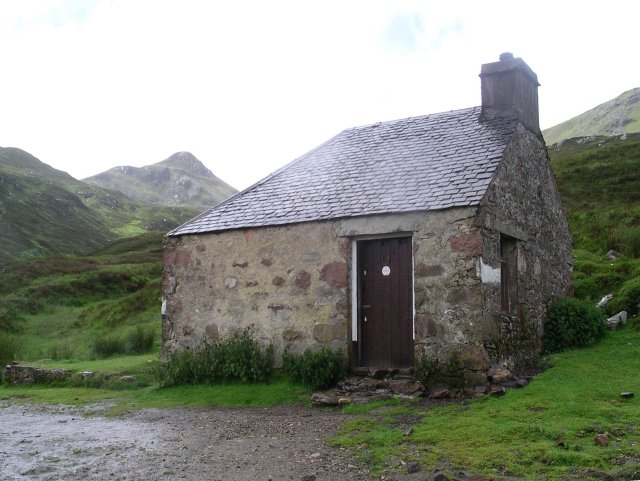
The traditional culture of Highland bothies gave the album its name.

Bennett explained Bothy Culture celebrates not only his own country's Gaelic culture and music, but also the music of Islam, for which he held a long-lasting fascination due to its vocals, modes and instrumentation being "similar in emotion" to Gaelic music styles, and the music of Scandinavia, which he found to have the same heavy-beat rowdiness and "solitary sweetness" of the ceilidh music he played in his upbringing. He felt he understood Islamic and Scandinavian music as soon as he heard them due to them expressing themselves without words: "I recognised them to be some past life I had lived through perhaps, or they seemed to well up under my fingers without my awareness."

The album is named for bothies, the Highland huts where travellers and shepherds would traditionally meet, rest, swap tunes and party. Bennett had stayed in bothies when trekking the Highlands, and had over time taken note of the bothy songs and tunes written by shepherds and drovers over generations, and noted similar traditions in other worldwide mountainous cultures, especially those with bothy-style traditions, like Spain, Austria, Greece, China, Bulgaria and Turkey. He found comparisons between the atmospheres of bothies and urban nightclubs, where he had "spooky" experiences arriving for soundchecks when the clubs were cold and empty, but noted: "Although the music and songs that have been played in them are totally contrasting, it is this same sense of excitement that can transform four bare walls into a chamber of sheer sensual delight."

Mairi McFayden of Bella Caledonia noted the significance of the bothy as a totemic symbol within the album. She said, despite a bothy seeming "unremarkable in itself," it nonetheless holds significant importance within Highland culture in that it they were the source of many memorable and important experiences for peoples' lives – "of gathering and companionship, of togetherness, of conviviality, of sharing stories, music and song. Of communitas." She felt this was "at the heart" of Bothy Culture: "whether the rhythmic entrainment of the rave or nightclub or the cultural intimacy and conviviality of the bothy, both are a vital a source of this dynamic life force – a feeling of connection to something outside and beyond our own individual, corporeal existence."

=== Music ===
First and foremost an album of dance music, Bothy Culture primarily celebrates and draws from the music of Bennett's native Gaeldom as well as Scandinavian music and Islamic music. Dave Sleger of AllMusic felt the album mixes music from Punjabi, Scandinavian, Turkish and Irish cultures with modern club music styles like rave, techno and hip-hop, creating what he calls a "assiduous hybrid." Though Bennett's previous work used electronic dance beats, Bothy Culture developed upon the prominence of these beats considerably, with styles of drum and bass and trippy breakbeats. Billboard believed the album uses Bennett's native folk styles as the touchstone for what is essentially an "ultramodern" world music album, while CMJ New Music Monthly emphasised the album's mixing of Gaelic traditions with "skittering electronic beats." The Times felt the album was dominated by its Scottish and Islamic music elements.

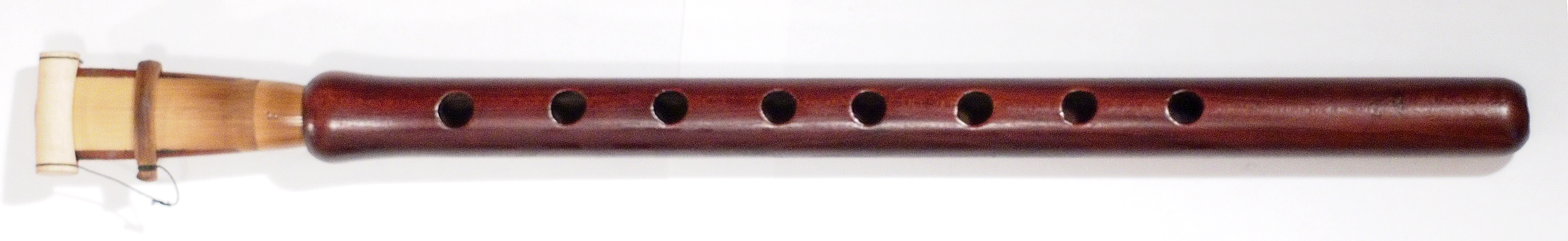
Bennett plays a doudouk on "Ud the Doudouk"

Bennett plays all the instruments on the album, with instruments as eclectic as the flute and violin, the Turkish oud and dudek and numerous electronic and programming devices. As with Glen Lyon (2002), Bothy Culture is one of Bennett's more studio-based albums. Permeating throughout is a "flat" synth sound that is often minimised by the bagpipes, violin, unusual vocal snippets, samples and "other electronic curiosities." The large amount of percussive breakbeats, as is common with contemporary dance music, augment Bannett's pipe and fiddle playing throughout, though the electronic beats are mostly unobtrusive, allowing the fiddles and pipes more room to permeate. Other electronic sounds on the album include ambient textures like in that of contemporary electronica, including modem-style squeals and micro-processed winds.

Described by Bennett as "a party tune with a pile of twaddle over the top," the opening "Tongues of Kali" is an upbeat number flavoured by Punjabi music, and contains funky grooves, bagpipes, sitar and "DJ tinged mayhem." It starts with thick vocal gargling, keyboard work and percussion which journalist Scott Frampton compared to the sound of "someone whacking a caber tosser's thigh," before the appearance of a house hi-hat rhythm and later a "sort of Gaelic scat." Author Gary West compared the song's Eastern mouth music with the Gaelic styles of puirt à beul and canntaireachd. The second track, "Aye?," features the word 'aye' muttered in numerous inflections; Kate Molleson of The Guardian called it "a stroke of deadpan brilliance, spoken word stripped back to a single redolent syllable. Bennett never overdid things." "Sputnik in Glenshiel" is reminiscent of Stéphane Grappelli, and combines Celtic and Middle Eastern violin "rhapsodies."

The fourth track, "Hallaig," features a sample of Gaelic poet Sorley MacLean reading his poem of the same name shortly before his death in 1996. The originally Gaelic language poem is named for the deserted township on Raasay, MacLean's birthplace, and reflects on the nature of time and the Highland Clearances' historical impact, leaving a desolated landscape. Mairi McFayden of Bella Caledonia felt it was "poetic that many of those lost lifelines from the diaspora have found their way back through music," and called the track "quietly political in its beauty" and the album's "centrepiece." The hypnotic "Ud the Doudouk" mixes melodies and Bennett's playing of the doudouk, a Middle Eastern woodwind instrument, with "techno club and Scottish folk beats". "4 Notes" is an ethnic-style techno track, while "Waltz for Hector" combines Bennett's traditional and modern playing styles, fusing Celtic and Mediterranean music elements atop a drum and bass rhythm, and finishes with Bennett playing the pibroch "Lament for Red Hector" on a lone bagpipe.

== Release and reception ==
Professional ratings
Review scores
Source	Rating
Allmusic	4/5 stars
Billboard	(favourable)
CMJ New Music Monthly	(favourable)
The Encyclopedia of Popular Music	4/5 stars
The Living Tradition	(favourable)

Bothy Culture was released on 20 October 1997 (13 January 1998 in the US) by Rykodisc. A relative commercial success, the album topped the US college radio charts. On the CMJ New World chart, based on combined reports of reggae and world music airplay on American radio stations, Bothy Culture reached a peak of number 3. A music video for "Tongues of Kali" was directed by David Mackenzie and filmed at The Arches, Glasgow, in 1998. The music video was for many years unavailable, until The Martyn Bennett Trust uncovered the video and re-released it in January 2018 for the album's 20th anniversary.

Although Bennett played all the instruments on Bothy Culture himself, he formed the band Cuillin when touring in promotion of the album, helping make the music sound "more organic" and helping to inject "even more energy" into his performances. In addition to Bennett, the band contained Deirdre Morrison (violin, vocals), Rory Pierce (Irish pipes, percussion and flutes) and Bennett's wife Kirsten (samples, backline and keys). The tour began in late 1997 at King Tut's Wah Wah Hut, Glasgow, and continued throughout 1998 in Europe, in which the group played their "heady mix of Scottish trad, club grooves and world beats." Notable performances on the tour included a stint at T in the Park, and, after an official invitation from the Scotland national football team, a performance at the Buddha Bar in Paris ahead of the opening 1998 World Cup match between Scotland and Brazil, where Ewan McGregor, Sean Connery and Ally McCoist joined the band on stage to dance.

Bothy Culture received positive critical reviews. Dave Sleger of AllMusic named it an "Album Pick", calling the album's mix of Punjabi, Scandinavian, Irish and Turkish cultures with rave, techno and hip-hop a "assiduous hybrid," and concluding: "It's loud, it's unrelenting and it's insurgent." Paul Verna of Billboard wrote that Bennett used his "native folk styles" as a "launching pad for a tastily idiosyncratic, ultramodern world music blend that ranks with the best of the progressives like Deep Forest or Wolfstone," and called the album a "consistently entertaining set." Scott Frampton of CMJ New Music Monthly felt that "Bothy Culture's filtering of traditional Highland sounds through urban modernity [is] more than equal to the sum of its parts." Keith Witham of The Living Tradition wrote that Bennett was a rare a musician "who doesn't have to hide behind electronic gadgetry to cover a lack of technical proficiency. As a classically trained musician he really is a master of his chosen instruments."

Colin Irwin of The Independent reflected that Bothy Culture won Bennett many friends and marked him out as "a leading figure in the evolution of Scottish music," calling the album a "storming mix of Gaelic tradition, raw emotion and glorious, full-blooded dance beats." The album has been called "pioneering" by The Guardian, and "groundbreaking" by the BBC, and by The Scotsman. Readers of the Scotland on Sunday voted Bennett the winner of the 1998 Glenfiddich Spirit of Scotland Award for Music, while the album came close to earning a Mercury Music Prize nomination. In a retrospective review, Colin Larkin rated the album four stars out of five in The Encyclopedia of Popular Music and called it "hugely impressive album that encompassed Bennett's multicultural approach to modern music." Neil McFayden of Folk Radio UK wrote in 2018 that "Bothy Culture still sounds as fresh and exciting as it did on the day of its release."

== Bothy Culture and Beyond ==
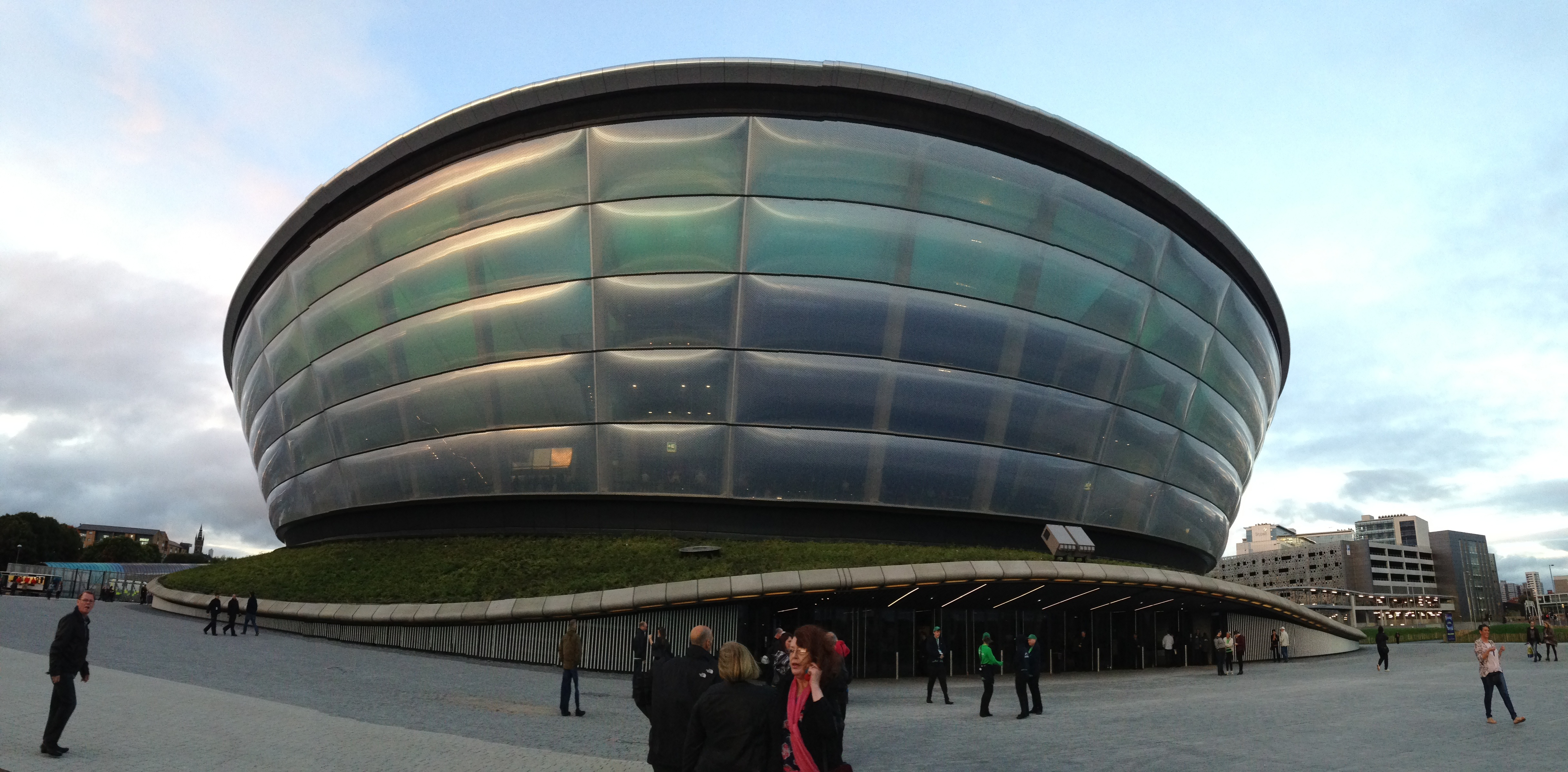
The SSE Hydro, where Bothy Culture and Beyond was performed.

To celebrate the 20th anniversary of Bothy Culture, and the 25th anniversary of the Celtic Connections festival, arranger and conductor Greg Lawson's GRIT Orchestra, named after Bennett's final album Grit (2003) and containing some 100 traditional folk, classical and jazz musicians, performed the show Bothy Culture and Beyond at the SSE Hydro, Glasgow as part of the festival on 27 January 2018. The shows were billed as a "music-vision-dance-bike spectacular," and feature Lawson's rearrangements of the tracks from the album, as well as visual spectacles, including internationally famous Scottish stunt cyclist Danny MacAskill, whose appearance was inspired by the film The Ridge (2014), in which MacAskill performed a stunt to the soundtrack of Bennett's "Blackbird". The show was Lawson and the GRIT Orchestra's second tribute to a Bennett album, following their Celtic Connections tribute to his final album Grit in 2015, although the orchestra was even bigger for Bothy Culture and Beyond, adding a backline of Scottish fiddlers including Duncan Chisholm, Chris Stout and Aidan O'Rourke. Lawson was a friend of Bennett, and when asked why he chose to perform Bothy Culture, he said:

"Grit celebrated the vocal traditions in Scottish music whereas Bothy Culture is about the melodic and dance traditions. It’s about saying 'let's hold hands and go dancing and have a fantastic time.' Being glad to be alive is a thing to celebrate and that’s what Bothy Culture means to me."

The bulk of the music was the result of two separate string sections, with numerous Scottish fiddlers leading the traditional melodies in one string section while accompanying soundscapes were provided by classical violins, double bass and cellos in the other. The voice of "Aye?" was provided by Innes Watson of the Treacherous Orchestra. David Hayman read Sorley MacLean's English translation of "Hallaig," while in a break from the album, Fiano Hunter and the Glasgow Chapel Choir recreated the Grit song "Blackbird", accompanied by Danny MacAskill's stunt cycle work. "Shputnik in Glenshiel" was accompanied by whistle from Fraser Fifeld, while "Ud the Doudouk" featured punches of brass, Innes’ spirited chants and a "perfectly-timed finish." Meanwhile, the "impossibly whacky" intro for "Joik" was translated to strings, brass and percussion, unifying the folk and classical string sections. "Waltz for Hector" was heralded in by drum beats and soft whistles and featured a percussion section from James MacKintosh capturing the song's complex beats.

The show was critically acclaimed from the likes of The Scotsman ("an epic arrangement of another Bennett album"), the BBC, The Times ("the effect can be like standing in the actual landscape famously captured by a master in oils"), The Guardian, who called the show a "multimedia celebration" and "a weird fusion of the deep-rooted and brazenly off-kilter", and Folk Radio UK, who said the show "brought Martyn’s incredible music back to a live audience and proved just how complex his ideas, how inclusive his influences and wide-ranging his imagination really were." Bella Caledonia said: "If the original live show GRIT was about a celebration of lost voices – of remembrance – then this year’s event was an unapologetic and euphoric celebration of Bennett’s life, energy and vision. Bothy Culture is dance music first. Everyone was as high as a kite," while McFayden of Folk Radio UK said: "As Greg Lawson said on the night – this was one man’s music, and it took this immense event to bring that music back to the stage. This week is the 13th anniversary of Martyn’s passing, and the music he was making 20 years ago continues to inspire today’s musicians. That's always worth remembering."

== Track listing ==
1. "Tongues Of Kali" (7:07)
2. "Aye?" (6:22)
3. "Shputnik In Glenshiel" (5:50)
4. "Hallaig" (8:19)
5. "Ud The Doudouk" (5:44)
6. "4 Notes" (5:55)
7. "Joik" (3:26)
8. "Yer Man From Athlone" (6:25)
9. "Waltz For Hector" (9:20)

== Personnel ==
- Martyn Bennett – instruments, production
