= Music schools in Scotland =

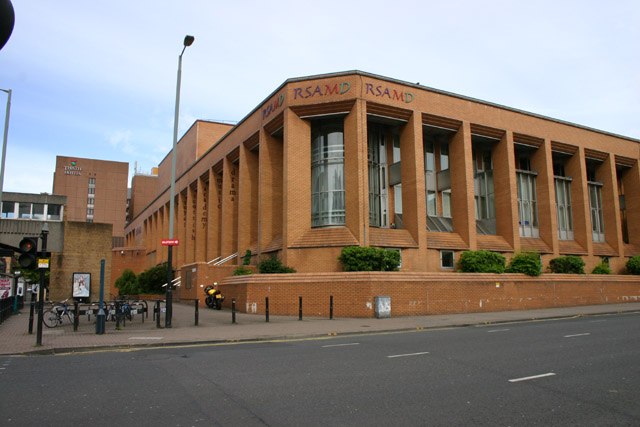
Royal Conservatoire of Scotland, Glasgow

Music schools in Scotland are available at several levels. Formal music education begins at 4½ years and can progress as high as postgraduate studies. Education in Scotland is a responsibility of the Scottish Government. Music is regarded as being an integral part of the culture of Scotland.

== Music service ==
Music services are working in almost all state schools and provide much of their instruction during the regular school day. Most of them offer instrumental tuition for pupils in their schools. On average one instrumental / vocal lesson lasts from 30 minutes and is usually given once a week.

A primary school is usually limited in the numbers of pupils they provide lessons to and lessons usually comprise a small group of 2 to 4 children.

Most independent (fee-paying) schools work on a similar basis to the above. Some independent schools such as Loretto School also give music scholarships.

== Centres of excellence ==
Scotland has six centres of excellence – schools which allow gifted children to maximise their potential (four for music and one each for dance and sport). These schools select a small number of pupils who show a special ability in music. Admission is by audition. The schools are located within comprehensive schools from which they receive normal academic classes. Students are attracted from within the local region and even nationally.

The music schools comprise:

- Douglas Academy Music School at Douglas Academy, Milngavie, near Glasgow
- Aberdeen City Music School at Dyce Academy, Aberdeen
- Sgoil Chiùil na Gàidhealtachd (National Centre of Excellence in Traditional Music) at Plockton High School, Plockton
- City of Edinburgh Music School at Broughton High School and Flora Stevenson Primary.

The number of music students is relatively small in comparison with the host school. Secondary students at the City of Edinburgh Music school are 30-40 compared to 1,000 within the host High School, and of the 1,000 students of Douglas Academy, around 50 are music specialists. Typically, music students receive individual instrument lessons, theory and practice time within the music school. The City of Edinburgh Music School is the only 'centre of excellence' which directly operates within a primary school. The schools are funded by the Local Education Authority within which they are located.

Douglas Academy Music School, Aberdeen City Music School and the National Centre of Excellence in Traditional Music all have Halls of Residence, and so are able to accommodate students from across Scotland. City of Edinburgh Music School works with families to find a suitable host family and has previously accommodate students from across Scotland and from across the globe.

== Specialist music school ==
St Mary's Music School is an independent (private) specialist music school in Edinburgh, Scotland, for children aged 9–18, with boarding facilities. The school offers education to musically talented children and is the only specialist full-time music school in Scotland that is not associated with a state school. In addition to their main studies, students receive intensive instruction on a solo instrument and a program of music according to their age. This includes ear training, chamber music, chorus, composition, jazz and music technology.

Entry is solely by audition. Successful applicants receive financial support through the Scottish Government's Aided Places Scheme. Students combine both academic and music studies within the school. The school is also the choir school of St. Mary's Episcopal Cathedral and all its 70 students are either instrumentalists or choristers. It attracts its pupils nationally, from the rest of the UK and abroad.

St Mary's is a member of the UK Music and Dance Excellence (MADE) Schools and is within the tradition of other specialist music schools throughout Europe such as the Dresden Music Gymnasium; Sächsisches Landesgymnasium für Musik "Carl Maria von Weber" or the Yehudi Menuhin School, England.

== Private tuition ==
Amateur or Private Schools of Music offers music education outside the general education system for students aged 4 to 20 + years. In general, students attend these schools, weekend or evening. The schools are, for example those provided by individuals, charitable or commercial organizations. Examples include the North East of Scotland Music School, Portobello Music School, Dunbar Music School and Yamaha Music School.

In addition qualified teachers provide musical training outside of an establishment or the mainstream education system for pupils aged 4 to 20+ years. The objective of education varies from amateur to training (pre-) professional music training, according to the personal ambitions of students.

== Universities and colleges ==
A number of universities have music departments and offer degrees in music — Bachelor, Master and Doctorate. They may be performance related and/or music theory which can be combined with other subjects, or they may be hybrid courses incorporating performance along with business and entrepreneurial skills. Scottish universities offering degrees include:

- University of Glasgow, Glasgow established 1451
- University of Aberdeen, Aberdeen established 1495
- University of Edinburgh, Edinburgh established 1583
- Edinburgh Napier University, Edinburgh incorporated as university 1992, established 1964
- University of the West of Scotland, Ayr
- University of the Highlands and Islands, Inverness

There are a number of colleges offering popular and contemporary music courses in Scotland at NQ, National Certificate, Higher National Certificate and Higher National Diploma level. Many of these courses may specialise within a particular area of music, such as the Electronic Music and Recording course at Clydebank College. Scottish colleges offering these courses include:

- Ayrshire College
- Dundee and Angus College
- Edinburgh College
- Forth Valley College
- Glasgow Clyde College
- Glasgow Kelvin College
- Lews Castle College
- New College Lanarkshire
- North East Scotland College
- North Highland College
- Perth College UHI
- West College Scotland

== Conservatoire ==
The Royal Conservatoire of Scotland (RCS), formerly known as the Royal Scottish Academy of Music and Drama, is Scotland's conservatoire of music, theatre and dance. Although there is some overlap with the music departments of Universities, the Conservatoire seeks to be practical and focuses on career development. In 1993, as the RSAMD, it was first in the United Kingdom which was granted to give their own degrees. Research degrees are validated by the University of St Andrews.

== Junior conservatoire ==
The Royal Conservatoire of Scotland operates a Junior Conservatoire, these are auditioned courses that run on Saturdays and Sundays during term-time. Approximately 250 students attend these classes and they are intended for those children with above average performing arts ability and potential. For music students, lessons may include; choir, ensembles, theory and musicianship classes, and principal study lesson, whereas for musical theatre students, lessons may include; dance (jazz or ballet), devised theatre, repertoire, and acting through song.

== Military ==
The Army School of Bagpipe Music and Highland Drumming is a training centre of the British Army. Instructions in the military music of Scottish piper bagpipes and pipe bands is available.

== See also ==
- Music school
- Education in Scotland
- List of pre-college music schools
- List of university and college schools of music
- Music of Scotland
- National Youth Orchestra of Scotland
