= Music school =

Institution specializing in music education

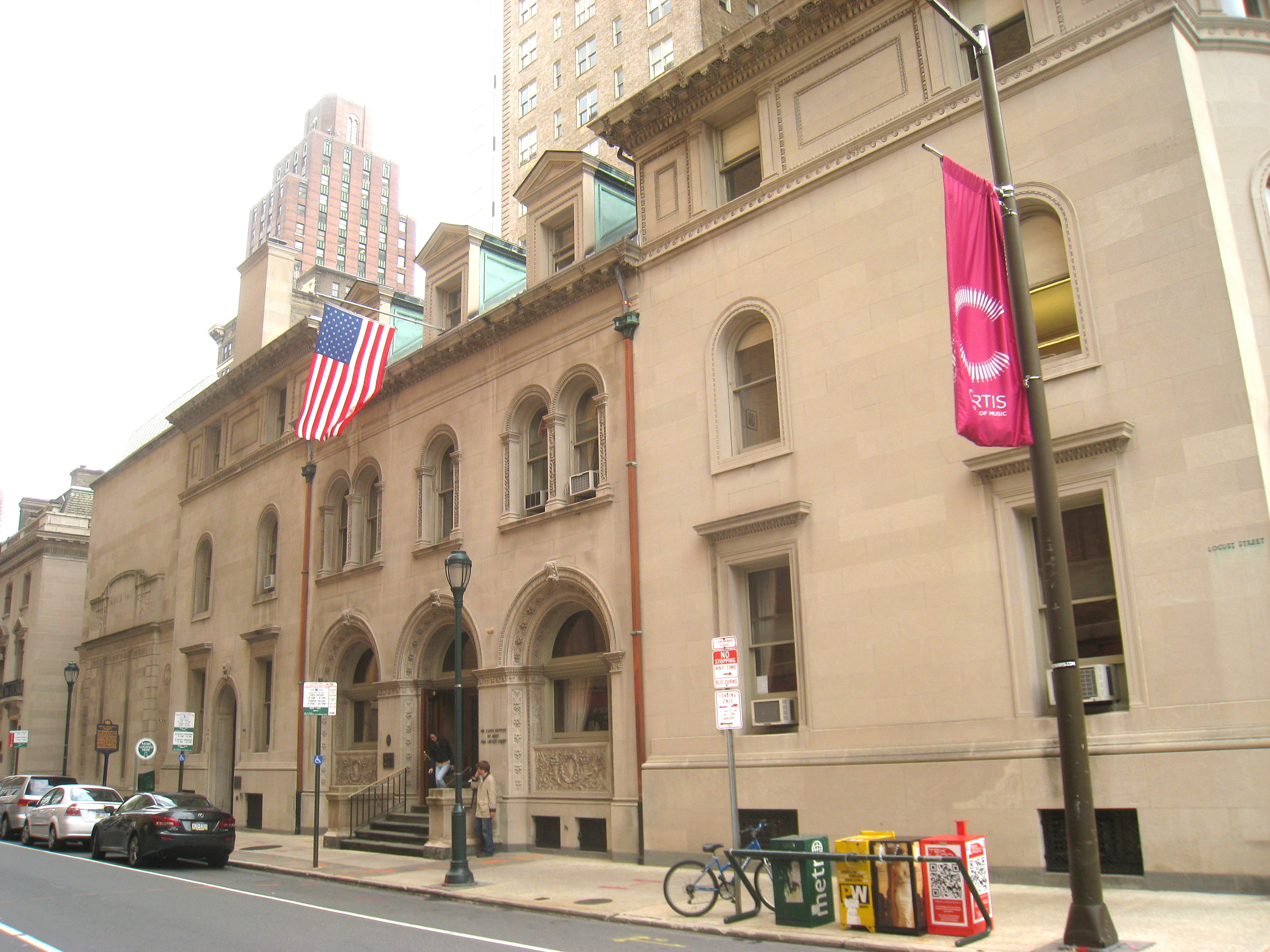
Curtis Institute of Music in Philadelphia, one of the world's most elite conservatoires

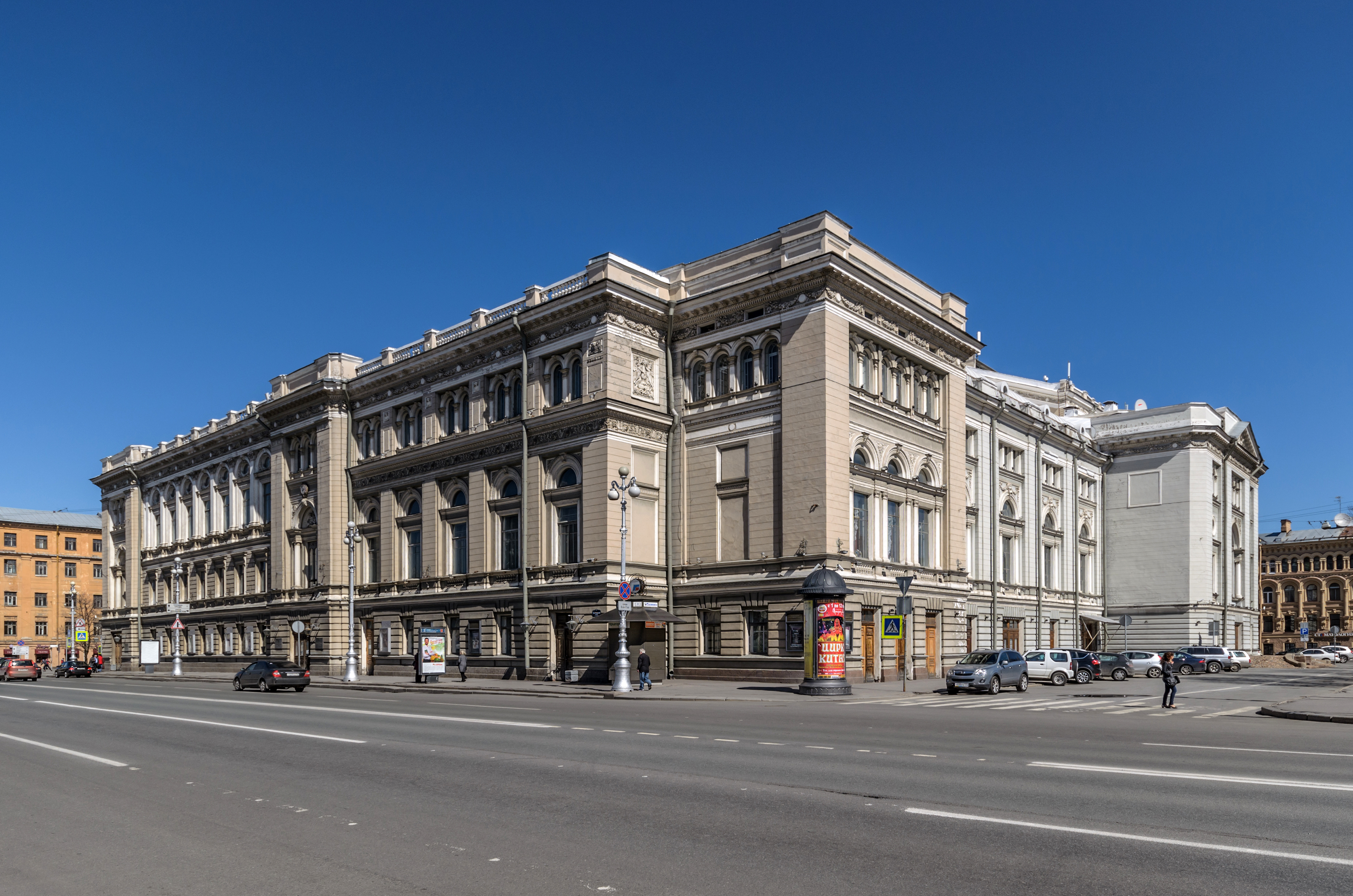
Graduates of the Saint Petersburg Conservatory in Russia include Pyotr Ilyich Tchaikovsky, Sergey Prokofiev, Dmitri Shostakovich, and George Balanchine.

A music school is an educational institution specialized in the study, training, and research of music. Such an institution can also be known as a school of music, music academy, music faculty, college of music, music department (of a larger institution), conservatory, conservatorium or conservatoire (/kənˈsɜːrvətwɑːr/ kən-SER-və-twar). Instruction consists of training in the performance of musical instruments, singing, musical composition, conducting, musicianship, as well as academic and research fields such as musicology, music history and music theory.

Music instruction can be provided within the compulsory general education system, or within specialized children's music schools such as the Purcell School. Elementary-school children can access music instruction also in after-school institutions such as music academies or music schools. In Venezuela El Sistema of youth orchestras provides free after-school instrumental instruction through music schools called núcleos.

The term "music school" can also be applied to institutions of higher education under names such as school of music, such as the Eastman School of Music of the University of Rochester; music academy, like the Sibelius Academy or the Royal Academy of Music, London; music faculty as the Don Wright Faculty of Music of the University of Western Ontario; college of music, characterized by the Royal College of Music and the Berklee College of Music; music department, like the Department of Music at the University of California, Santa Cruz; or the term conservatory, exemplified by the Conservatoire de Paris and the New England Conservatory. In other parts of Europe, the equivalents of higher school of music or university of music may be used, such as the Hochschule für Musik und Tanz Köln (Cologne University of Music).

== History ==
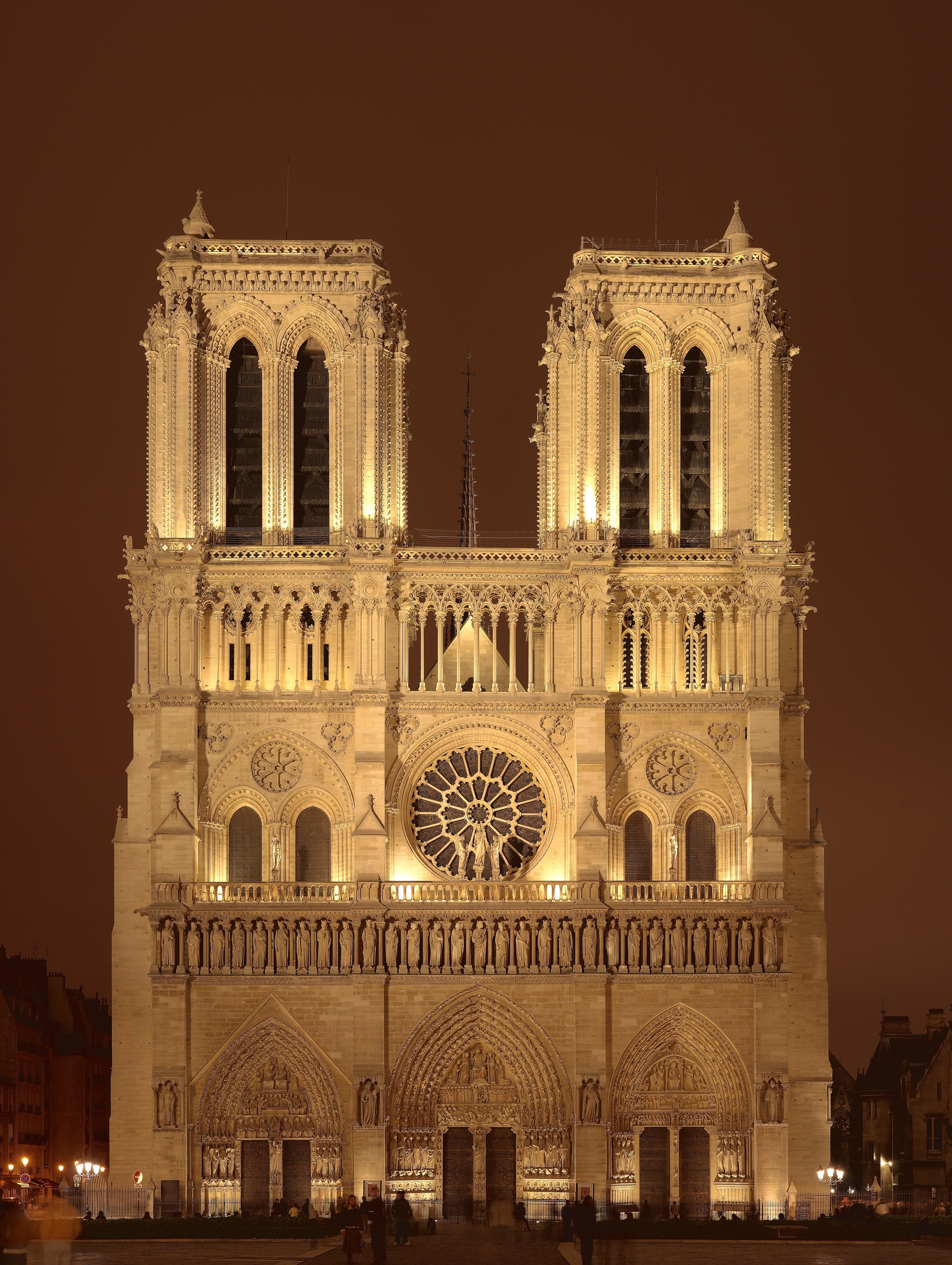
Based around Notre-Dame de Paris, the Notre-Dame school was an important centre of polyphonic music.

Although music in general and music education may have been in existence for thousands of years, the earliest history is speculative. Even when history starts to be recorded, music is mentioned more frequently than music education. Within the biblical tradition, Hebrew litany was accompanied with rich music, but the Torah or Pentateuch was silent on the practice and instruction of music in the early life of Israel. However, by I Samuel 10, Alfred Sendrey suggests that we find "a sudden and unexplained upsurge of large choirs and orchestras, consisting of thoroughly organized and trained musical groups, which would be virtually inconceivable without lengthy, methodical preparation". This has led some scholars to believe that the prophet Samuel was the patriarch of a school which taught not only prophets and holy men, but also sacred-rite musicians.

The schola cantorum (papal choir) in Rome may be the first recorded music school in history, when Gregory the Great (540–604) made permanent an existing guild dating from the 4th century (schola originally referred more to a guild rather than school). The school consisted of monks, secular clergy, and boys. Wells Cathedral School, England, founded as a Cathedral School in 909 AD to educate choristers, continues today to educate choristers and teaches instrumentalists.

Saint Martial school, 10th to 12th century, was an important school of composition at the Abbey of Saint Martial, Limoges. It is known for the composition of tropes, sequences, and early organum. In this respect, it was an important precursor to the Notre Dame School. The Notre Dame school (late 12th and early 13th century) developed the earliest repertory of polyphonic music to gain international circulation. First records on the Spanish Escolania de Montserrat, a boys' choir linked to a music school, date back to 1307.

=== Renaissance ===
The Accademia Nazionale di Santa Cecilia (National Academy of St Cecilia) is one of the oldest musical institutions in the world, based in Italy. It is based at the Auditorium Parco della Musica in Rome, and was founded by the papal bull, Ratione congruit, issued by Sixtus V in 1585, which invoked two saints prominent in Western musical history: Gregory the Great, for whom the Gregorian chant is named, and Saint Cecilia, the patron saint of music. It was founded as a "congregation" or "confraternity" – a religious guild, so to speak – and over the centuries, has grown from a forum for local musicians and composers to an internationally acclaimed academy active in music scholarship (with 100 prominent music scholars forming the body of the Accademia) to music education (in its role as a conservatory) to performance (with an active choir and symphony orchestra).

The term conservatory has its origin in 16th-century Renaissance Italy, where orphanages (conservatori) were attached to hospitals. The orphans (conservati 'saved') were given a musical education there, and the term gradually applied to music schools. These hospitals-conservatories were among the first secular institutions equipped for practical training in music. By the 18th century, Italian conservatories were already playing a major role in the training of artists and composers.

=== 16th–18th centuries ===
In the city of Naples, a conservatorio was strictly a secular place for teaching and learning specializing in music education. There were already four conservatories in Naples active in the 16th and 18th century:

- I poveri di Gesù Cristo ('The Paupers of Jesus Christ'), founded in 1599 by Marcello Fossataro, already included in their official record a magister musicæ and magister lyræ in 1633;
- Santa Maria di Loreto was founded in 1535, where the composer Giovan Battista Pergolesi (1710–1736) studied;
- La pietà dei turchini was founded in 1583 and the earliest findings suggest musical activity around the year 1615;
- Sant'Onofrio a porta Capuana was founded in 1578, was the first conservatory in the world. Here the composer Giovanni Paisiello (1740–1816) studied and then taught, started teaching music in the mid-1600 and in the following decades will give more priority to the opera buffa;
- plus one only for girls called dell'Annunziata.

It is in these very institutions that the so-called Scuola Musicale Napoletana was developed, thanks to the work of musicians and educators like Alessandro Scarlatti (1660–1725) and Francesco Durante (1684–1755), who was also Pergolesi's and Paisiello's teacher.

The Palermo Conservatory was founded by the viceroy De Castro in 1617; the teaching of music was introduced there many decades later, with lessons in choral singing and violin.

=== 18th–19th centuries ===
It was the example set in Naples, where admission was by competitive examination and tuition was free, that was then copied, with modifications, in many European cities, including Paris (1795), Bologna (1804), Milan (1807), Warsaw (1810), Florence and Prague (1811), Vienna (1821), London (1822), the Hague (1826), Liège (1827); a bit later two conservatories were founded in Russia by Rubinstein brothers – Anton in Saint Petersburg (1862) and Nikolai in Moscow (1866). The second half of the 19th century saw the network expanding to the Americas, Rio de Janeiro (1847), Boston (1853), Baltimore and Chicago (1868), Havana (1885), and Buenos Aires (1893). Establishments for advanced training in music were organized in the 1940s in several Asian and African countries, including Iraq, Lebanon, and Kenya.

To this extent, projects like El Sistema are more in line with the tradition set in Italy (where tuition at conservatories remains still free) than in an English-speaking country, where students have a very selective access to bursaries (see the Royal Academy of Music or the Royal College of Music in the UK).

== Primary and secondary education ==
=== Specialist music schools ===
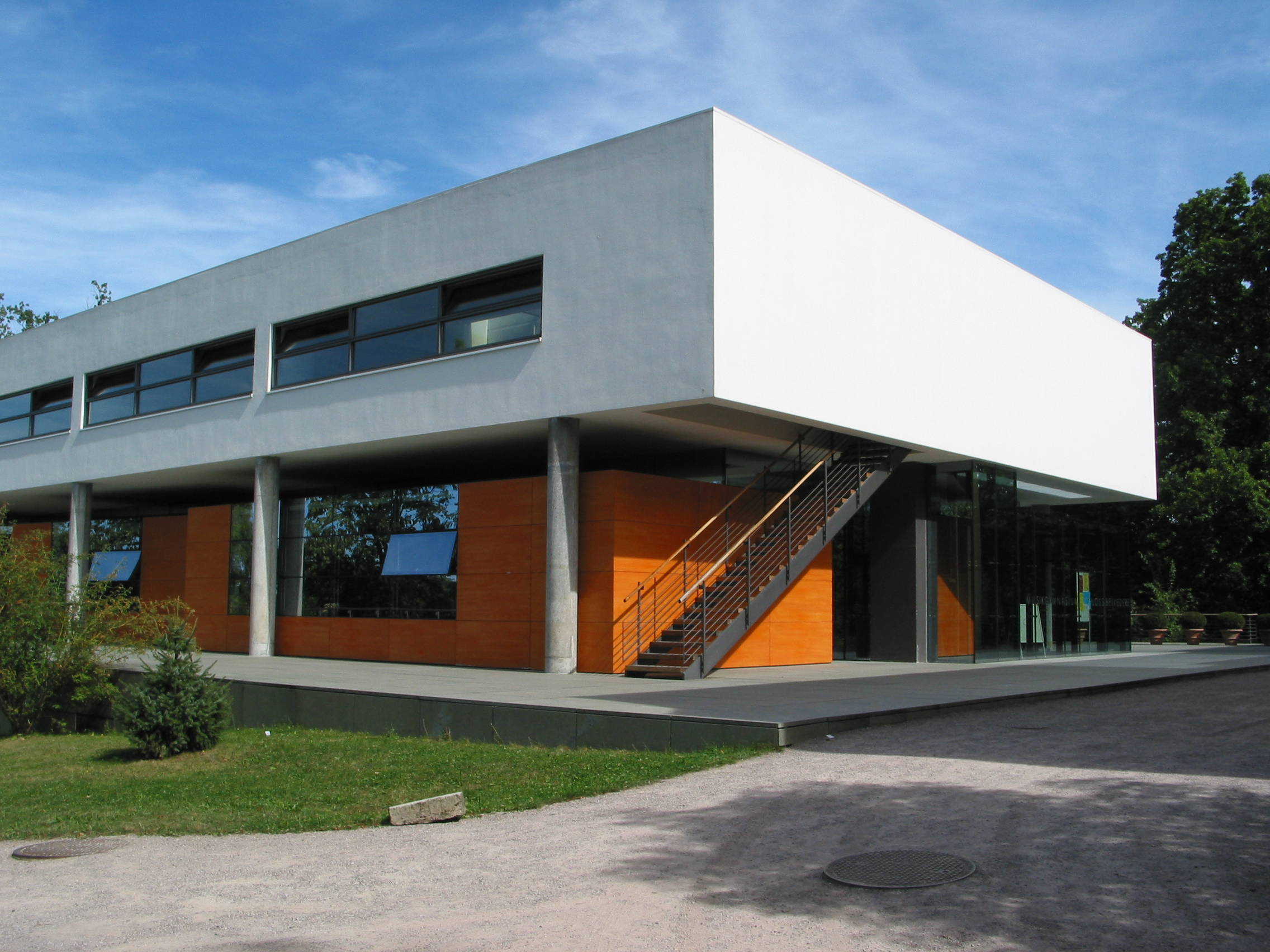
Musikgymnasium Schloss Belvedere, a specialist music school in Weimar, Germany

Specialist music schools exist in many countries and whose purpose is to identify, and assist, children with exceptional potential, to benefit from world-class specialist training as part of a broad and balanced education, which will enable them, if they choose, to proceed towards self-sustaining careers in music. These schools may be formally or informally attached to a conservatory. Entry is typically between the ages of ages 8 and 18 and admission is through competitive audition. Schools may be public or independent; where schools are independent, pupils may be in receipt of governmental or private scholarships. Typically as students progress through the school the time spent on music increases and on academic subjects decrease. These schools usually teach only instrumentalists but may also include choristers.

Some schools (like conservatories) are broader and may cover the performing arts: music, drama, dance.

=== Music schools within schools ===
Many music schools are located within existing schools. The pattern is quite diverse and may include:

Specialist music units in Scotland, where students are drawn from an area wider than the host schools catchment. Students will receive specialist music tuition within the music school but are fully integrated within the host school for other lessons. Entry to the specialist music unit or school is by competitive audition, which also effectively gives entry to the host school.

Many public or independent schools contain music departments, some of which achieve high standards. These are sometimes referred to as Music schools. Music Colleges in England are schools that get additional private and governmental money to specialize in music. Entry is to the host school and musical ability is not an admission requirement. Schools which perform highly may specialize in an additional area for example sports or technology.

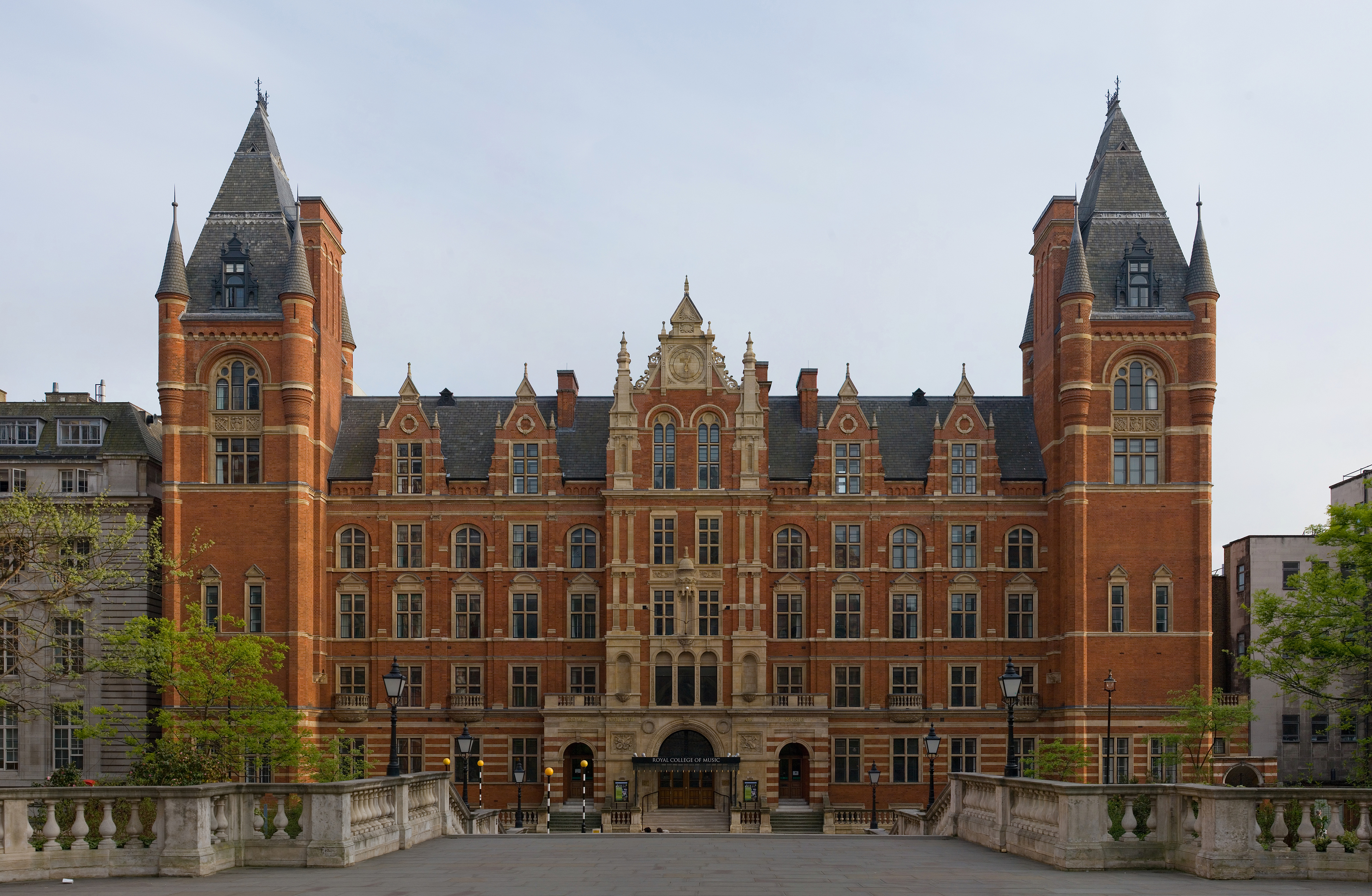
300 children attend the Royal College of Music's Junior Department in London.

Music schools also frequently operate from church facilities.

=== Pre-college divisions ===
Many conservatories or other tertiary-level institutions have pre-college divisions or junior departments for children of school age. Typically the curriculum includes individual lesson(s), orchestra, chamber music, theory, musicianship, composition and music technology. Classes are usually held on a Saturday and children attend normal schools during the week.

=== Music schools outside the general education system ===
Non-governmental or private schools of music offer music education outside the general education system for students aged 4 to 20+ years. In general, students attend these schools weekend or evening. These schools are typically provided by individuals, charitable or commercial organizations.

== Tertiary education ==
=== Conservatory ===
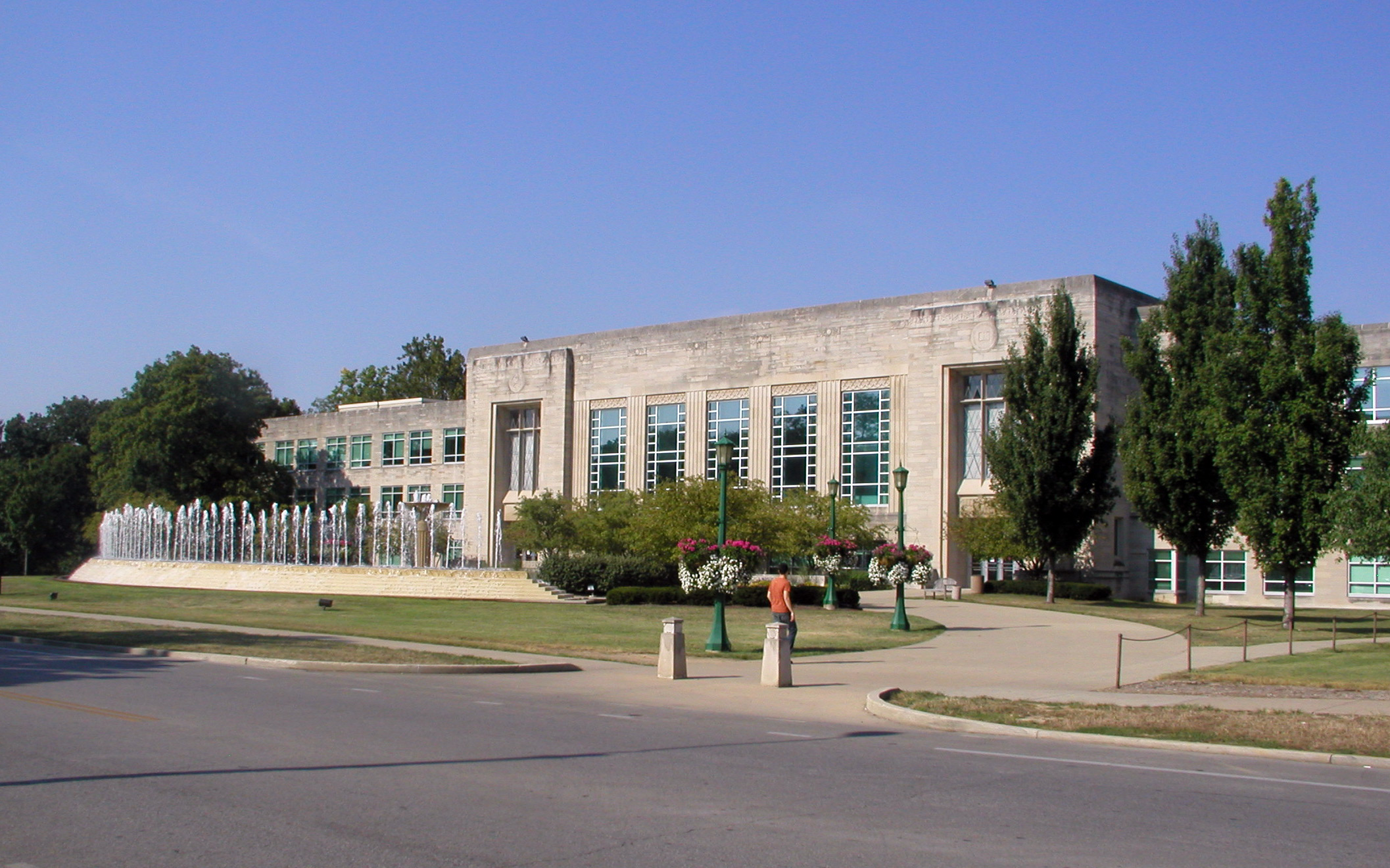
Jacobs School of Music, part of Indiana University in Bloomington, Indiana, has over 1,600 students.

A conservatory of music may also be known in English as conservatoire (chiefly in the UK), conservatorium (in Australia), academy or college. Some schools or conservatories are exclusively focused on music. Others have a wider focus, for example covering music, drama and dance. Conservatories are suitable for students who wish to develop their performance, conducting, or composition to a professional standard. Typically, they offer a high percentage of practical training combined with academic study and professional development for those considering a career in the creative arts. Individual teaching is the strength of most components.

Students have the opportunity to perform, conduct or have their music played on a regular basis, both informally and in public. This may be solo or as part of an orchestra, ensemble or band. Typically, conservatories focus on Western classical music. However, some schools focus on traditional instruments, such as Chinese instruments. Others may have departments for traditional music which includes both traditional and classical instruments, for example bagpipes alongside the fiddle. Alternatively, students can focus on jazz, world music or pop music.

The time required to complete music degrees is generally not much different from degrees in other fields, i.e. 3–4 years for a Bachelor of Music degree, 1–2 years for a Master of Music degree, and 3–5 years for a Doctor of Musical Arts or Doctor of Music Degree. A PhD degree can be gained for areas such as musicology, music theory, music composition, music education, or music therapy. Some schools may offer a non-academic degree that is solely performance based, such as the (United States) A.D. or Artist Diploma; this may be offered at the undergraduate and/or graduate level.

=== University schools of music ===
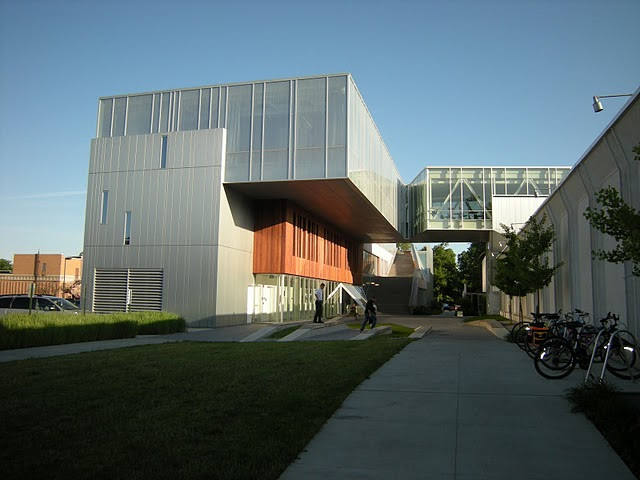
Oberlin Conservatory of Music at Oberlin College in Oberlin, Ohio

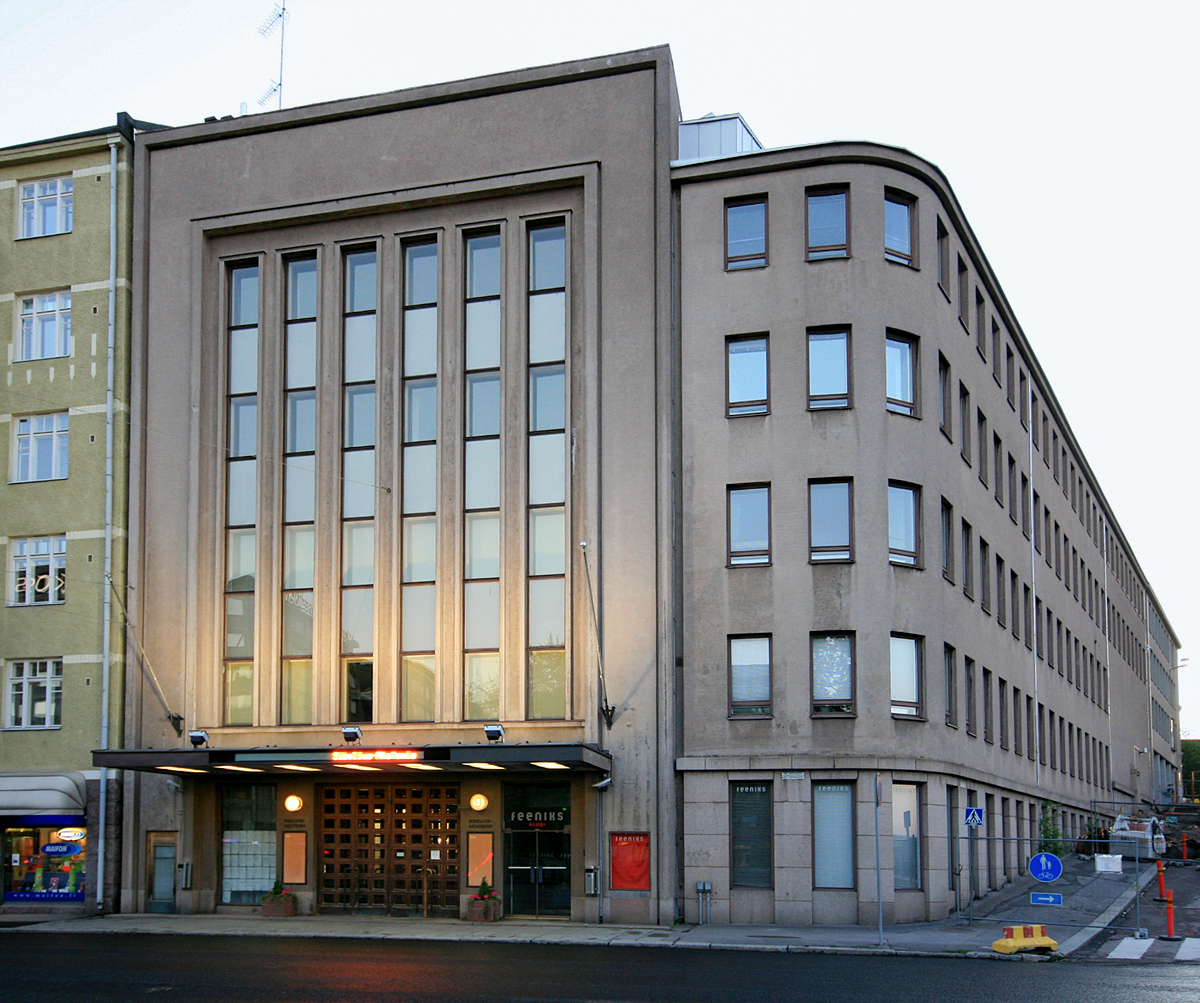
Sibelius Academy in Helsinki, Finland

University music departments originally placed more emphasis on academic study of music, rather than performance. However, today, the division may not be so rigid, with many often placing greater emphasis on performance now than they did in the past. The specific balance of vocational training and academic study varies from one institution to another, and from one country to another. Some countries separately define their institutions between university status and vocational university status, whilst other countries do not define such a rigid division. In addition to offering degrees similar to those offered at conservatories, some universities offer non-professional music-related degrees such as a Bachelor of Arts in Music or a Bachelor of Arts in Music Education. A number of previously independent conservatories have become affiliated to universities

== See also ==
Country-specific pages

- Music schools in Scotland
- Music schools in the United Kingdom
- Music schools in the United States
- Category:Music schools by country

Lists

- List of university and college schools of music
- List of pre-college music schools

National and international organisations

- Associated Board of the Royal Schools of Music
- Conservatoires UK
- European Association of Conservatoires
- (United States) National Association of Schools of Music

Diplomas

- First Prize
- Bachelor of Music
- Master of Music
- Doctor of Musical Arts
