= Hardland =

Studio album by Martyn Bennett and Martin Low
- Released: 2000
- Recorded: 1999
- Genre: Celtic fusion
- Length: 58:24
- Producer: Martyn Bennett and Martin Low

Martyn Bennett and Martin Low chronology
Bothy Culture (1998)	Hardland (2000)	Glen Lyon (2002)

Hardland is the third studio album by the Scottish Celtic fusion artist Martyn Bennett. It was released in 2000 in collaboration with a fellow artist/producer Martin Low.

Of the album, Bennett says, "As a fashion statement Hardland does not follow current trends. Dance music is evolving so rapidly, that it became our conscious decision not to try and emulate any particular dance genre and focus instead on making it sound 'Hard and Scottish'."

Bennett was touring this album after heavy radio play of "Harry's In Heaven" which heavily sampled the same Harry Lauder sample used in "Deoch an Dorais" from his eponymous first album. However, his cancer diagnosis in October 2000 led to the cancellation of the remainder of that tour and Bennett would never perform live again.

== Track listing ==
1. "Love is Here (Intro)"
2. "Love Machine"
3. "Spree"
4. "Threadbare"
5. "How it Got There"
6. "Harry's in Heaven"
7. "Handshaker"
8. "Snipe Shadow"
9. "Rasta Plan"
10. "This Sky Thunders"
11. "Distortion Pipe"
12. "PLAY"
