= The Hazey Janes =

Scottish indie pop band

- Origin: Dundee, Scotland
- Genres: Indie; Pop
- Years active: 2000–present
- Labels: Armellodie
- Members: Andrew Mitchell; Alice Marra; Matthew Marra; Liam Brennan
- Website: thehazeyjanes.com

The Hazey Janes are an indie pop band from Dundee, Scotland.

== Background ==
The band consists of Andrew Mitchell (vocals, guitar, keyboard), Liam Brennan (drums, vocals, percussion) and siblings Alice Marra (vocals, guitar, keyboard, synthesizer) and Matthew Marra (bass guitar, keyboard, glockenspiel). They formed in 2000 and play a fusion of country-rock and indie-pop, with a penchant for heavy folk harmonies.

== Career ==
In 2004 the band recorded a self-titled mini-album with record producer Mark Freegard (Manic Street Preachers, The Breeders, Del Amitri). This was followed in 2006 by their first full-length album, Hotel Radio. Recorded with Paco Loco (Golden Smog, The Sadies, Josh Rouse) in El Puerto de Santa Maria, Spain, the record met with significant acclaim from Q magazine, Mojo, Uncut, Classic Rock and The Word.

In 2006 they performed at South by Southwest Music Festival in Austin, Texas, opening for Susanna Hoffs of The Bangles. In 2007, the band recorded a second album, Hands Around The City, with producer John Agnello (The Hold Steady, Sonic Youth, The Walkmen) at Water Music Recorders in Hoboken, New Jersey. The group again performed in Austin at SXSW, this time performing on a bill with The Presidents of the United States of America, and also played their first shows in New York City and New Jersey.

The band have toured throughout the UK, performing both as headlining artists and as support for Snow Patrol, Elbow, Idlewild, Brakes, Aberfeldy and Gorky's Zygotic Mynci.

In October 2011 they released their third full-length album, The Winter That Was through Armellodie Records. The album was self-produced and recorded on the outskirts of Dundee with engineer, Robin Sutherland.

The quartet have opened as guests for WILCO on the 2012 European leg of their world tour. In 2013 they appeared with and Deacon Blue at Birmingham Symphony Hall, Liverpool Echo Arena, London's Royal Albert Hall and Glasgow's The Hydro.

In March 2012 the group collaborated with singer-songwriter Michael Marra on an EP entitled Houseroom. The six tracks were recorded over the duration of two days by engineer by Gordon McLean at An Tobar in Tobermory on the Isle of Mull. The record was released through Tob Records on 19 March. Michael Marra was the father of band members Alice Marra and Matthew Marra.

In 2014, they released their fourth album, Language of Faint Theory, their second release on Armellodie Records. The album was co-produced with Paco Loco and mixed by John Agnello, the team that collaborated on their debut, "Hotel Radio". In June 2016 the band released "The Light Comes Back", a collaborative album with poet, author and playwright Liz Lochhead, and saxophonist Steve Kettley through Tob Records.

Mitchell records and performs solo as Andrew Wasylyk and is a member of Idlewild.

== Discography ==
=== Albums ===
- The Hazey Janes - Mini LP (Measured Records CD, 2004)
- Hotel Radio (Measured Records CD, 2006)
- Hands Around The City (Unreleased, 2008)
- The Winter That Was (Armellodie Records CD/Download, 2011)
- Houseroom - Collaboration EP w/ Michael Marra (Tob Records CD, 2012)
- Language of Faint Theory (Armellodie Records CD/Vinyl/Download, 2014)
- The Light Comes Back - Collaboration album w/ poet, author, playwright Liz Lochhead (Tob Records CD, 2016)
- Hands Around The City Live - Recording of a live performance of their unreleased second album (Armellodie Records CD/Download, 2017)

=== Singles ===
- "Your Enemy" b/w "Feel Alright" & "Piecebaggers" (written by Chris Hogan) (Measured Records CD, 2006)
- "Your Enemy" b/w "Silly Games" (written by Dennis Bovell) (Measured Records 7", 2006)
- "Always There" b/w "Anywhere Today" & "Something Between Us" (Measured Records CD, 2006)
- "Always There" b/w "Chasin' Mary Ann" (Measured Records 7", 2006)
- "Fire in the Sky" b/w "Love Is Gold" & "Meet on the Ledge" (written by Richard Thompson) (Measured Records Download, 2006)
- "New York" b/w "The City Shaped Its Arm Around Her" (Roseangle/TriTone Records 7", 2008)
- "Carmelite" (Armellodie Records Download, 2011)
- "Girl in the Night" (Armellodie Records Download, 2011)
- "The Fathom Line" (Armellodie Records Download, 2014)
- "If Ever There Is Gladness" (Armellodie Records Download, 2014)
- "All Is Forgotten" b/w "The Fathom Line (TFA Remix)" & "Iwan (Mouchettes Remix)" (Armellodie Records Download, 2014)
