= College of Piping =

School in Glasgow City, Scotland

The College of Piping
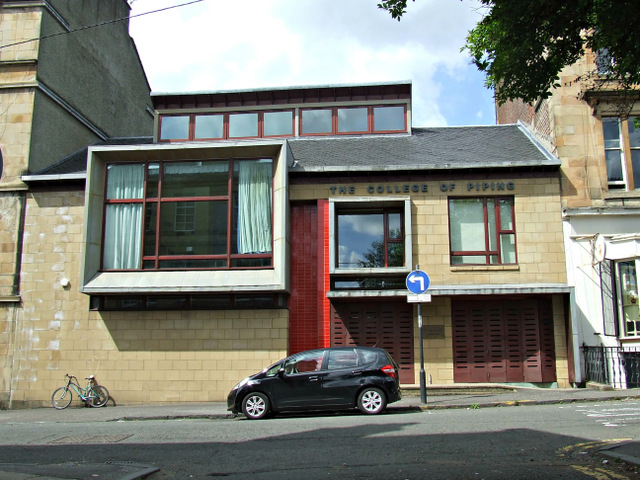
- The College of Piping on Otago Street
- Founders: Seumas MacNeill and Thomas Pearston
- Established: 1944
- Focus: Teaching, preserving, and promoting the Great Highland Bagpipe
- Location: Glasgow, Scotland
- Dissolved: 2018

The College of Piping was founded in Glasgow, Scotland, in 1944 by Seumas MacNeill and Thomas Pearston to pass on the art of the Great Highland Bagpipe to all who wanted to learn Scotland's national instrument. As well as teaching, the college's aims were to preserve the heritage of the bagpipe by collecting piping artefacts, manuscripts and memorabilia and by providing a focal point for pipers the world over. College lessons were subsidised by profits from the College Shop which sold instruments, music, Highland wear and bagpipe accessories. A charity, the college often taught students of low means for free.

The College of Piping Tutor Book 1, by the then Joint Principals Seumas MacNeill and Thomas Pearston, was first issued in 1952, and is easily the biggest selling book on the bagpipe ever issued, selling to date (2011) 400,000 copies. This book is also available in Scottish Gaelic, French, German and Italian. In 2008 it became available in digital format and in 2011 available on iPad and iPhone.

Since 1948 the College of Piping has published the Piping Times monthly magazine, once described by Captain John MacLellan, former Director of the Army School of Piping at Edinburgh Castle, as the biggest single repository of bagpipe knowledge in the world. The magazine had a current worldwide readership estimated in 2011 at 10,000. That same year it became available on iPhone and iPad having previously been available in digital format since 2008. The PT, as it was affectionately known, adhered to the highest standards of journalism and was often provocative and fearless in its criticism of what it sees as contrary to the interests of pipers and pipe bands. In 2005 it campaigned successfully to have the World Pipe Band Championships televised by the BBC and three years later fought to save one of the leading pipe bands in the country, the Strathclyde Police Pipe Band, from budget cuts imposed by a new Chief Constable.

The college pioneered outreach teaching of the bagpipe when, in the early 1950s, Seumas MacNeill established schools of piping in North America. This undoubtedly led to an upsurge of interest in Scottish bagpiping on that continent and in no small way contributed to the high standard of piping in Canada and the United States currently enjoyed there. In 2007, the college established the first outreach teaching school on the European mainland when it launched its Winter School in Germany in association with the Pipers Corner shop at Brüggen. This school has since relocated to Homburg in Saarland. The college has two annual school in the US in California and New England in June and July each year. The College of Piping is a registered charity in the United Kingdom.

In March 2018 The National Piping Centre took over The College of Piping which then ceased to exist. The premises at Otago Street are used by the National Piping Centre for teaching, competition and recital and is known as 'The National Piping Centre Otago Street, Formerly known as The College of Piping.'
