= Michael Marra (singer-songwriter) =

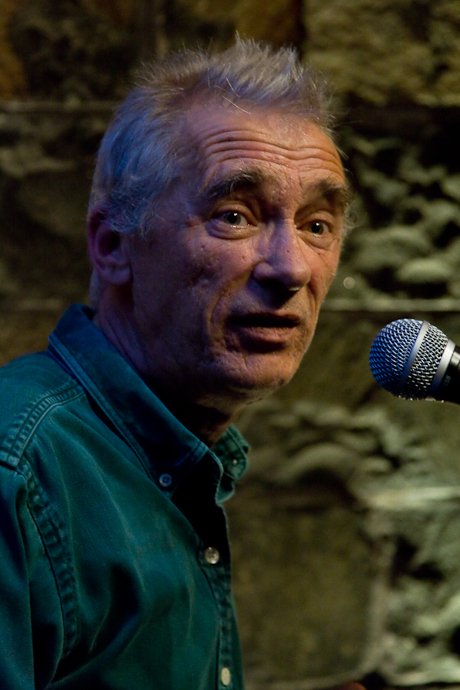

Background information
- Born: Michael Marra; 17 February 1952; Dundee, Scotland
- Died: 23 October 2012 (aged 60) Dundee, Scotland
- Occupations: Singer; songwriter

Michael Marra (17 February 1952 – 23 October 2012) was a Scottish singer-songwriter and musician from Dundee, Scotland. Known as the Bard of Dundee, Marra was a solo performer who toured the UK and performed in arts centres, theatres, folk clubs and village halls. While mainly known as a songwriter, he also worked extensively in theatre, radio and television. His songwriting was rooted in Scottish life and he found an audience within and beyond the folk music scene, which led to him working as a support musician for performers including Van Morrison, The Proclaimers, Barbara Dickson and Deacon Blue. His song "Hermless" was somewhat humorously suggested as a potential Scottish national anthem.

== Origins ==
Marra was brought up in the Lochee district of Dundee, the son of a printer and a schoolteacher. His first public performance, in the 1950s, was at a Christmas party given by NCR, formerly a major employer in the city, with a large factory there.

== Musical career ==
Marra attended Lawside Academy, leaving school at 15 and trying a variety of trades – electrician, baker and builder – before heading for the folk clubs of London. There he played in the band Hen's Teeth with fellow Scottish songwriter Dougie MacLean, before forming the band Skeets Boliver with his brother Chris. Marra played with Skeets Boliver in the mid-1970s, alongside drummer Brian McDermott, saxman Peter McGlone, Gus Foy, Stewart Ivins, and Chris Marra. Signed to Thunderbird Records at an inopportune time, when punk was gaining popularity, the band released two singles, "Streethouse Door" and "Moonlight in Jeopardy", to critical success. They also featured in an edition of the BBC Everyman religious programme, "I Can't See the Light."

In September 2007 Marra released the CD Quintet, featuring five songs about five musicians – Peerie Willie Johnson, Peter McGlone, Thomas Fraser, Martin Carthy and Dr. John. In November 2007, he appeared in a new production of The Demon Barber at Perth Theatre in Scotland where he performed all his music live on stage. Marra also created the opera Nan Garland, which was performed at Dundee Rep in 2004. Three years later, in September 2010, the album Michael Marra, recorded live on tour in 2010 with Mr McFall's Chamber, was released on Delphian Records.

Marra performed original songs with the Scottish Symphony Orchestra, the Scottish National Orchestra, Concerto Caledonia, Mr McFall's Chamber, and his own quintet. He sang duets with Patti Smith, Eddi Reader, Karen Matheson and Karine Polwart.

In 2003 Marra collaborated with Martyn Bennett for his final album Grit (Martyn Bennett album), contributing a spoken passage for the song "Liberation". In an interview Marra stated, "When I first heard it, I thought I sounded like a minister, and that came as a surprise to me. But I think that's what he was after to tell the truth", later joking: "I might become a minister".

His songs have been covered by a wide range of artists, including Sylvia Rae Tracey, Coope Boyes and Simpson, Alan Cumming, Leo Sayer and Rab Noakes. Marra's live CD, Recorded Live on Tour with Mr McFall's Chamber was released on Delphian Records in 2007. In 2012 he released Houseroom, a six-track collaboration CD with The Hazey Janes, on Tob Records.

An exhibition of his portraiture prints was shown at Dundee's Bank Street Gallery.

== Musical theatre ==
Marra wrote original music and worked both as an actor and musical director in theatre.

His first production with Wildcat Stage Productions was Fancy Rappin' and he frequently worked with its Director, Alan Lyddiard at Dundee Rep. He played several roles in the Wildcat and Freeway production of John McGrath's Border Warfare at the Tramway Theatre in February/March 1990.

He wrote and performed in the show In Flagrant Delicht which was written in collaboration with Scottish Makar and playwright Liz Lochhead. The show was performed in Washington DC and Melbourne, Australia.

Marra's operetta If The Moon Can Be Believed was performed at the Dundee Rep to sell out audiences. He collaborated with Graham McLaren of Theatre Babel on a new production of The Demon Barber for Perth Theatre having previously worked with him on Liz Lochhead's Beauty and The Beast.

His play St Catherine's Day played to full houses at the Òran Mór Glasgow and the Dundee Repertory Theatre. He also collaborated with award winning choreographer Frank McConnell and his dance company Plan B on "Love and Pocket Money", parallel|parallels and A Wee Home From Home.

== Songwriting ==
In April 2006, having his fingerprints routinely taken by Customs in Washington D.C. – where he was performing as part of Tartan Week – Marra was inspired to write a protest song about Scottish police detective Shirley McKie, who had been wrongly accused of leaving her thumbprint at a murder scene in 1997. When she denied the print was hers, she was arrested and charged with perjury but acquitted in 1999. In February 2006, McKie received an out-of-court settlement of £750,000 from the Scottish Executive, which first minister Jack McConnell described as a result of an honest mistake. In the song, Marra wrote:

"We lecture children if they're telling lies
They will not prosper and they will not thrive...
And even the First Minister must sometimes stand naked."

Marra's work, though often humorous, tackled a range of social and political issues. His song "Lieblings in The Absence of Love", was written in response to the tension he had witnessed during riots in Bonn, and the treatment of the refugees thereafter. His song "Chain Up The Swings" discusses the practice of some Scottish Christian communities who would chain up the swings on a Sunday, so the children would be prevented from playing on the sabbath. Tackling literary adaption, "Happed in Mist" revolves around the executed deserter from the famous Scottish novel Sunset Song. He proposed his work "Hermless" as an alternative national anthem. The song is intended as a contrast to typical militaristic and imperialist national anthems, and describes the day-to-day life of an innocent meek character who claims,

"Ma feet micht be big but the insects are safe
They'll never get stood on by me"

concluding,

"Naeb'dy would notice that I wasnae there
If I didnae come hame for ma tea..."

== Personal life ==
Marra was married to Peggy, and their children, Alice and Matthew, are also musicians and members of the Dundee-based group, The Hazey Janes. Former Labour MSP Jenny Marra and current Labour MSP Michael Marra are his niece and nephew.

Marra was a supporter of Dundee F.C.

== Death ==
Michael Marra died in Ninewells Hospital on 23 October 2012, aged 60, of throat cancer.

== Legacy ==
A mural of Marra was painted in Lochee which was completed on 28 May 2021 by Michael Corr.

== Awards ==
In 2007 Marra was awarded an Honorary Doctorate by Dundee University in recognition of his contribution to the cultural profile of his home town, and in 2011 he was made an Honorary Doctor of Letters by Glasgow Caledonian University. He also won the Herald Angel Award in 2010 for his performance at The Acoustic Music Centre during the Edinburgh Fringe Festival.

== Discography ==
Studio albums

- The Midas Touch (1980)
- Gaels Blue (1985)
- On Stolen Stationery (1991)
- Candy Philosophy (1993)
- Posted Sober (2002)

Live albums

- Pax Vobiscum (1996)
- Recorded Live on Tour 2010 (with Mr McFall's Chamber) (2010)

EPs

- Silence (2003)
- Quintet (2007)
- Houseroom (with The Hazey Janes) (2012)
