= Foot Stompin' Celtic Music =

British record label

Foot Stompin' Celtic Music (often abbreviated to "Footstompin'") is a record label based in Edinburgh, Scotland.

== Artists ==
- Martyn Bennett
- Blazin' Fiddles
- Julie Fowlis
- Jim Malcolm
- Anna Massie
- Old Blind Dogs
- Peatbog Faeries
- Red Hot Chilli Pipers
- Session A9
- Simon Thoumire
- Maeve MacKinnon
- Broadway Play Stomp
