= Armellodie Records =

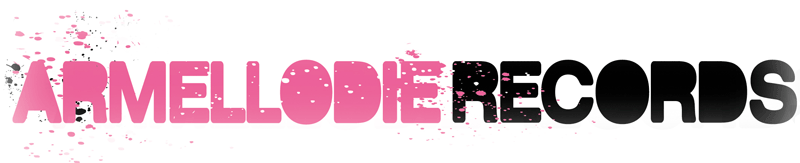
- Founded: 2007
- Founder: Al Nero and Scott Maple
- Country of origin: Scotland
- Location: Glasgow, Scotland
- Official website: http://www.armellodie.com/

Armellodie Records is a Scottish record label based in Glasgow, Scotland. Armellodie was established in 2007 by Al Nero and Scott Maple. The label is named after a track on Chilly Gonzales' 2004 album, Solo Piano.

== Biography ==
The label's first release, in February 2007, was a 7" single called 'Wound Up' by Scottish band, Le Reno Amps, a band fronted by label founders, Nero and Maple. Another Le Reno Amps single followed before the label made its first full signing in 2008, Elgin-based rock troupe, Cuddly Shark who released their debut single 'The Punisher of IV30'. The only other release in 2008 would come in the form of Sheffield's Kill The Captains who released a 4 track EP.

The label continued with a compact roster for the next few years, only adding math-pop trio, Super Adventure Club to the label before announcing over 2010 and 2011 the addition of Thirty Pounds of Bone, The Scottish Enlightenment, Chris Devotion & The Expectations, The Douglas Firs, Something Beginning With L and The Hazey Janes.

2012 saw the label make their 30th release and add yet more artists to their roster. This was also the first year which the label had been run between Guangdong, China and Glasgow after Nero's relocation.

In 2013, Armellodie released a second album by their first signings Cuddly Shark as well as new albums by Thirty Pounds of Bone, The Pure Conjecture, Super Adventure Club and two EP's from Galoshins.

In 2014, the label have released second albums from The Hazey Janes and Chris Devotion and the Expectations as well as the debut album from Dan Lyth and the Euphrates.

== Other activities ==
In early 2010, Armellodie ran a monthly club night in Glasgow's Bloc venue called BARmellodie. Each night would include a line up of three bands, both from the label and not on the label as well as a guest DJ.

Armellodie have also run summer label tours taking place in August 2012 and August 2013. The tours showcased many of the bands from the label.

== Artists ==
- Admlithi
- Appletop
- Chris Devotion and the Expectations
- Conor Mason
- Cuddly Shark
- Dan Lyth and the Euphrates
- Galoshins
- Gastric Band
- Kill the Captains
- Le Reno Amps
- Saint Max and the Fanatics
- Something Beginning With L
- Super Adventure Club
- The Douglas Firs
- The Hazey Janes
- The Pure Conjecture
- The Scottish Enlightenment
- Thirty Pounds of Bone
- Trapped Mice
- Yip Man
