= Aye (album) =

Compilation album by Martyn Bennett
- Released: 5 March 2012
- Recorded: 1994–2005
- Genre: Celtic fusion
- Length: 20:17
- Label: Long Tale Recordings
- Producer: Various

Martyn Bennett chronology
Love and Loss (2008)	Aye (2012)

Aye is the first compilation released featuring the works of Martyn Bennett, a Scottish-Canadian musician. It was released in 2012, seven years after Bennett's death and had tracks from four of his studio albums, as well as unreleased tracks.

== Track listing ==
1. Ud The Doudouk
2. 4 Notes
3. Liberation
4. Sky Blue Remix (Peter Gabriel)
5. Swallowtail
6. Harry's In Heaven
7. Crackcorn - unreleased track
8. Distortion Pipe
9. Paisley Spin - unreleased track
10. Blackbird
11. Stream

=== iTunes bonus track ===
12. Mackay's Memoirs
