= Celtic Women International =

Celtic Women International (CWI) is an American nonprofit organization, dedicated to "honor, celebrate and promote Celtic women and their heritage."

The CWI has the only tartan registered by the Scottish Tartans Authority to a women's group. The tartan was designed and woven by Marjorie Warren, and includes a color from the flag of each one of the seven Celtic Nations.

== History ==
The CWI was founded in Milwaukee, Wisconsin, on June 30, 1997 by Jean Bills. Ms Bills received financial assistance from the Shamrock Club of Wisconsin, of which Jean was treasurer at the time. In October 1998, was held the first international conference, attended by representatives of all seven Celtic nations (including the Galicia). By 2001, the meeting was held in Milwaukee. In 2002 took place in New Orleans, Louisiana and in 2003 in Toronto, Ontario, Canada.

Since 2004, the board of CWI has ceased to hold international meetings on account of high costs. Instead of them, preferred directing its focus to the creation of local branches of the organization. Local branches are located in Chicago, Illinois, Sheboygan Co., Wisconsin, and Cincinnati, Ohio, along with a book club in Milwaukee, Wisconsin.

== Celtic Women International Award ==
In 2003, a Celtic Women International Award was granted to the writer Margaret Bennett for "lifelong service to Scottish and Celtic Culture" at the annual conference in Toronto, Ontario, Canada.
