= City of Edinburgh Music School =

Coordinates: 55°57′44″N 3°13′22″W

Location
- 29 East Fettes Avenue; Edinburgh, EH4 1EG; Scotland

Information
- Established: 1980
- Director: Tudor Morris
- Deputy Director: Susan Emslie
- Patron: Sir Simon Rattle
- Website: http://www.edinburghmusicschool.co.uk

The City of Edinburgh Music School (TCoEMS) is a state-maintained music school in Edinburgh, Scotland. Founded as the Lothian Specialist Music School in 1980, it changed its name in 1996 when Lothian Regional Council was dissolved into four separate unitary councils. It is a non-residential school, and because it is funded by the City of Edinburgh Council, it charges no fees. It is split between two schools; Flora Stevenson Primary School and Broughton High School. This allows for students to start in their first year of primary school and leave in their final year of high school. It acquired new premises in 2009 when a new section was added to Flora Stevenson Primary School and a new building was constructed for Broughton High School. Unlike some standalone music schools, pupils attend comprehensive schools for the majority of their academic classes.

The school became an 'All-Steinway School' in 2009, meaning that every piano within the school is of the Steinway brand. It was awarded a plaque in commemoration of this from Steinway & Sons on 21 July 2009.

In 2018, the council attempted to shut the school down in order to use the funding elsewhere, however, due to uproar in the community from the parents and politicians, the school succeeded in remaining open.

The school was the subject of BBC Scotland's EX:S documentary, The Music School, on 29 March 2005.

== Notable alumni ==
- Martyn Bennett, bagpiper and composer
- Helen Grime, composer
- Shirley Manson, singer in Garbage
- Tommy Smith (saxophonist)
- Morgan Szymanski, guitarist

== See also ==
- Music Schools in Scotland
- List of music schools in the United Kingdom
