= Army School of Bagpipe Music and Highland Drumming =

Coordinates: 55.9097°N 3.2496°W

- Active: 1910–Present
- Country: United Kingdom
- Branch: British Army
- Type: Training
- Role: Bagpipe Music and Highland Drumming
- Garrison/HQ: Inchdrewer House, Edinburgh

The Army School of Bagpipe Music and Highland Drumming is a British Army training establishment that provides instruction on Scottish pipe band music to military pipers and drummers.

== History ==
Founded in 1910 as the Army School of Piping (later renamed the Army School of Bagpipe Music), the School was formerly located at Edinburgh Castle but is now located at Inchdrewer House near Redford Barracks in Edinburgh, Scotland and is administered by the Infantry Training Centre, it is also affiliated with the Royal Corps of Army Music. Generally regarded as the smallest unit in the British Army, the School is now commanded by a Director who is a qualified army Pipe Major and who usually holds the rank of Captain or Major (usually being commissioned from Warrant Officer rank on appointment). The Director is assisted by a Chief Instructor, who is the Senior Pipe Major of the British Army.

The School provides courses at different levels to pipers and drummers of the British Armed Forces throughout the year, and qualified instructors are drawn from the pipes and drums of various units in the British Army. The School accepts students from Commonwealth armed forces, but not civilians. It has in the past provided instruction to various police band members, but this has not taken place for a number of years.

The School forms part of the Piping and Drumming Qualifications Board, which is a collaboration among the Piobaireachd Society, the Royal Scottish Pipe Band Association, the College of Piping, and the National Piping Centre. Together, the Institute sets a standardised piping certificate programme for students from around the world.

== British Armed Forces Pipe Bands ==
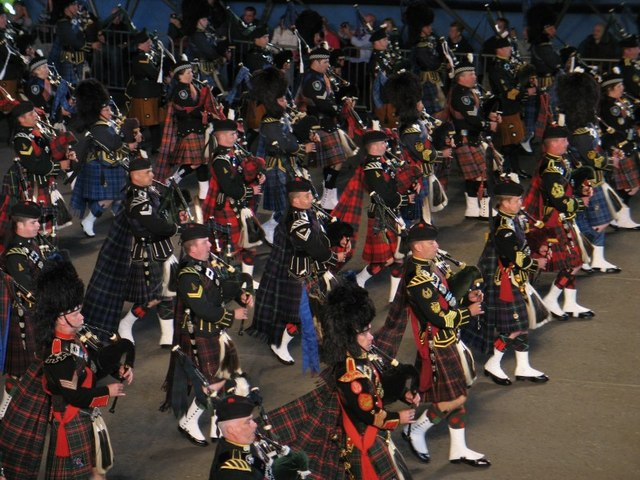
A massed band of pipe bands from the school at the Edinburgh Military Tattoo.

- Pipes and Drums of the Royal Scots Dragoon Guards
- Pipes and Drums of the Royal Dragoon Guards
- Pipes and Drums of the Queen's Royal Hussars
- Pipes and Drums of the Royal Tank Regiment
- Pipes and Drums of the Scottish and North Irish Yeomanry (Reserve)
- Pipes and Drums of the 1st Battalion, Scots Guards
- Drums and Pipes of the 1st Battalion, Irish Guards
- Pipes and Drums of the Royal Highland Fusiliers, 2nd Battalion, Royal Regiment of Scotland
- Pipes and Drums of the Black Watch, 3rd Battalion, Royal Regiment of Scotland
- Pipes and Drums of the Highlanders, 4th Battalion, Royal Regiment of Scotland
- Pipes and Drums of the 52nd Lowland, 6th Battalion The Royal Regiment of Scotland (Reserves)
- Pipes and Drums of the 51st Highland, 7th Battalion The Royal Regiment of Scotland (Reserves)
- Pipes and Drums of the 1st Battalion, Royal Irish Regiment (27th (Inniskilling), 83rd and 87th and Ulster Defence Regiment)
- Pipes and Drums of the 2nd Battalion, Royal Irish Regiment (27th (Inniskilling), 83rd and 87th and Ulster Defence Regiment) (Reserves)
- Pipes and Drums of the 1st Battalion, Royal Gurkha Rifles
- Pipes and Drums of the 2nd Battalion, Royal Gurkha Rifles
- Pipes and Drums of the Queen's Own Gurkha Logistic Regiment
- Pipes and Drums of the Queen's Gurkha Signals
- Pipes and Drums of the Queen's Gurkha Engineers
- Pipes and Drums of 19th Regiment, Royal Artillery
- Pipes and Drums of the 103rd (Lancashire Artillery Volunteers) Regiment Royal Artillery (Reserves)
- Pipes and Drums of the London Scottish (Reserves, now London Guards)
- Pipes and Drums of the London Irish Rifles (Reserves, now London Guards)
- Pipes and Drums of the Royal Corps of Signals
- Pipes and Drums of City of Edinburgh UOTC
- Drums and Pipes of Aberdeen UOTC
- Pipes and Drums of Glasgow and Strathclyde UOTC
- Pipes and Drums of Tayforth UOTC
- Pipes and Drums of 102 Battalion REME (Reserves)

=== Royal Air Force ===
- RAF Halton Pipes and Drums
- RAF Central Scotland Pipes and Drums
- RAF Cosford Pipes and Drums
- RAF Lossiemouth Pipes and Drums
- RAF Waddington Pipes and Drums
- Pipes and Drums of 2622 (Highland) Squadron
- RAF Pipes and Drums 502 Ulster Squadron ( northern Ireland )

== Directors ==
- Pipe Major John MacDonald of Inverness, Queens Own Cameron Highlanders, (1910–1914)
- Pipe Major John Grant, Seaforth Highlanders, (1914–1918)
- Pipe Major Willie Ross, Scots Guards, (1919–1958)
- Captain John A MacLellan, Queen's Own Highlanders, (1959–1976)
- Captain Andrew Pitkeathly, Argyll & Sutherland Highlanders, (1976–1981)
- Major John M Allan, Queen's Own Highlanders, (1981–1990)
- Major Gavin N M Stoddart, Royal Highland Fusiliers, (1990–2003)
- Captain Stuart D Samson, The Highlanders, (2003–2008)
- Major Steven Small, Black Watch (2008–2016)
- Major Gordon Rowan, Royal Regiment of Scotland, (2016–2024)
- Major Ross McCrindle, Scots Guards, (2024–present)

== See also ==
- Music schools in Scotland
