= Martyn Bennett (album) =

Studio album by Martyn Bennett
- Released: 1996
- Recorded: 1995
- Genre: Celtic fusion
- Length: 70:05
- Label: Eclectic
- Producer: Martyn Bennett

Martyn Bennett chronology
Martyn Bennett (1996)	Bothy Culture (1998)

Professional ratings
Review scores
Source	Rating
AllMusic	3/5 stars
The Encyclopedia of Popular Music	3/5 stars

Martyn Bennett is the first studio album by the Scottish Celtic fusion artist Martyn Bennett. It was released in 1996 on the Eclectic label.

The album combines traditional Celtic music with samples and hip hop programming.

== Critical reception ==
The Encyclopedia of Popular Music wrote that the album drew "praise for [Bennett's] bold fusion of modern dance rhythms with roots music from Celtic, Asian and Scandinavian sources."

== Track listing ==
1. "Swallowtail"
2. "Erin"
3. "Cuillin (Part 1)"
4. "Cuillin (Part 2)"
5. "Deoch An Dorus (Part 1)"
6. "Deoch An Dorus (Part 2)"
7. "Floret Silva Undique"
8. "Jacobite Bebop"
9. "3 Sheeps 2 The Wind (Part 1)"
10. "3 Sheeps 2 The Wind (Part 2)"
11. "Stream"
