= Grit (Martyn Bennett album) =

Studio album by Martyn Bennett
- Released: 13 October 2003
- Recorded: 2003
- Studio: Real World Studios
- Genre: Celtic fusion
- Length: 51:29
- Label: Real World Records
- Producer: Martyn Bennett

Martyn Bennett chronology
Glen Lyon (2002)	Grit (2003)	Mackay's Memoirs (2005)

Professional ratings
Review scores
Source	Rating
AllMusic	4/5 stars

Grit is the last studio album by the Scottish Celtic fusion artist Martyn Bennett. It was released on 13 October 2003 on the Real World label.

== Background ==
The album was recorded while Bennett was ill and unable to play his instruments, so instead he brought together samples of unaccompanied traditional Scottish folk singers, his own bagpipe and fiddle playing, and electronic drum beats. The opening track, "Move", samples a recording of traditional singer Sheila Stewart performing Ewan MacColl's "Moving On Song". Stewart was delighted that he was taking her music to a new audience. The album features many other traditional Scottish singers, including Lizzie Higgins and Scottish Gaelic singer Flora MacNeil, as well as Michael Marra narrating an English translation of Psalm 118 in the track "Liberation".

In Bennett's sleeve notes for Grit, he wrote, "In recent years so many representations of Scotland have been misty-lensed and fanciful to the point that the word 'Celtic' has really become a cloudy pigeon hole. This album was a chance for me to present a truthful picture, yet face my own reflection in the great mirror of all cultures." The album skillfully interweaves old and new sounds and has been "credited with starting the musical evolution of Celtic fusion".

The album cover shows a photo of the artist standing on top of a hill, behind a trig – an anagram of the album title.

== Release ==
Grit was re-released in May 2014 as part of the Real World Gold Series. In July 2017 Real World released the album on vinyl.

== Track listing ==
All tracks are written by Martyn Bennett, except where noted.

No.	Title	Length
1.	"Move" (Ewan MacColl, Yisrael Borochov, Bennett)	4:10
2.	"Blackbird"	6:10
3.	"Chanter"	4:10
4.	"Nae Regrets" (Charles Dumont, Michel Vaucaire, Norman Newell, Bennett)	3:50
5.	"Liberation"	4:20
6.	"Why"	4:30
7.	"Ale House"	3:50
8.	"Wedding"	5:45
9.	"Rant"	4:31
10.	"Storyteller" (Bennett, Yussef 'ali Bakâsh)	9:39

2014 reissue bonus tracks
No.	Title	Length
11.	"Sky Blue (Martyn Bennett Remix)" (Peter Gabriel)	5:19
12.	"Mackay's Memoirs"	14:19

== Personnel ==
- Martyn Bennett – production, programming, sampling, string arrangements, viola (8), guitar, strings, harmonium, smallpipes, recording, mixing

=== Additional musicians ===
- Sheila Stewart – vocals (1)
- Lizzie Higgins – traditional arrangement (2), vocals (2)
- Millennia Strings – strings (2, 5)
- Andrew Skeet – conducting (2, 5)
- Mairi Morrison – traditional arrangement (3), vocals (3)
- Anni Watkins – traditional arrangement (4), vocals (4)
- Petrea Cooney – chorus vocals (4)
- Murdina MacDonald – vocals (5)
- Effie MacDonald – vocals (5)
- Michael Marra – recitation (5)
- Sorren Maclean – drums (5), guitar loop (5)
- John Barlow – drums (5), guitar loop (5)
- Gordon Maclean – double bass (5)
- Flora MacNeil – traditional arrangement (6), vocals (6)
- Jeannie Robertson – vocals (7)
- Kirsten Bennett – piano (5, 8, 10), cello (5, 8, 10)
- Jimmie McBeath – vocals (9)
- John Purser – overtone singing (10)

=== Technical personnel ===
- Marco Migliari – additional recording
- BJ Stewart – photography

== 2015 orchestral arrangement ==
The opening event of the 2015 Celtic Connections festival was a new orchestral arrangement of the complete album, arranged and conducted by Greg Lawson under the title "Nae Regrets" to mark the tenth anniversary of Bennett's death. Musicians performing included the Scottish Chamber Orchestra, jazz musicians Phil and Tom Bancroft, singers Fiona Hunter, Annie Grace, Karen Matheson and Rab Noakes, and pipers Ross Ainslie, Calum MacCrimmon, Fraser Fifield and Ali Hutton. Lawson observed that "It's amazing how many people you need to accomplish what he did by himself." The event was described in The Guardian as a "ballsy one-off".

== Use in other media ==
The song "Blackbird" was used in the soundtrack for Danny MacAskill's 2014 film, The Ridge.

== Externals links ==
- Celtic Connections 2015, Opening Concert: Martyn Bennett's Grit (Image gallery). BBC Music. "Photos from the epic opening concert of Celtic Connections 2015."
- Celtic Connections 2015, Opening Concert: Martyn Bennett's Grit (Video playlist). BBC Music. January 2015. "Clips."
