= North East of Scotland Music School =

Coordinates: 57°8′42″N 2°6′19″W

Information
- Established: 1975; 51 years ago
- Website: www.nesms.org.uk

The North East of Scotland Music School is an independent charitable foundation established in Aberdeen, Scotland by the late Dorothy Hately MBE in 1975 with the encouragement of Lady Aberdeen. Its aim is to provide advanced tuition not normally available within the statutory sector by bringing internationally recognised teachers to Aberdeen on a regular basis. Entry to the school is by audition on the basis of musical ability regardless of age but limited to persons living in Scotland.

The school is financed through a mixture of corporate sponsorship, donations from trusts and individuals, and volunteer fund-raising. Students pay their own (subsidised) fees but competitive scholarships are awarded annually on a balance of musical potential and financial need.

Patrons include Murray McLachlan, Eileen Croxford Parkhouse, Evelyn Glennie, Fiona Kennedy, Paul Mealor, Lisa Milne and Neil Mackie.

== Notable former tutors ==
- Hugh Bean (violin)
- Gilbert Biberian (guitar)
- James Blades (percussion)
- John Carol Case (voice)
- Raimund Herincx (voice)
- Ifor James (horn)
- Neil Mackie (voice)
- Donald Maxwell (voice)
- John Shirley-Quirk (voice)

== See also ==
Music schools in Scotland
