= Margaret Bennett (writer) =

Scottish musician, broadcaster, writer

Margaret Bennett HRSA
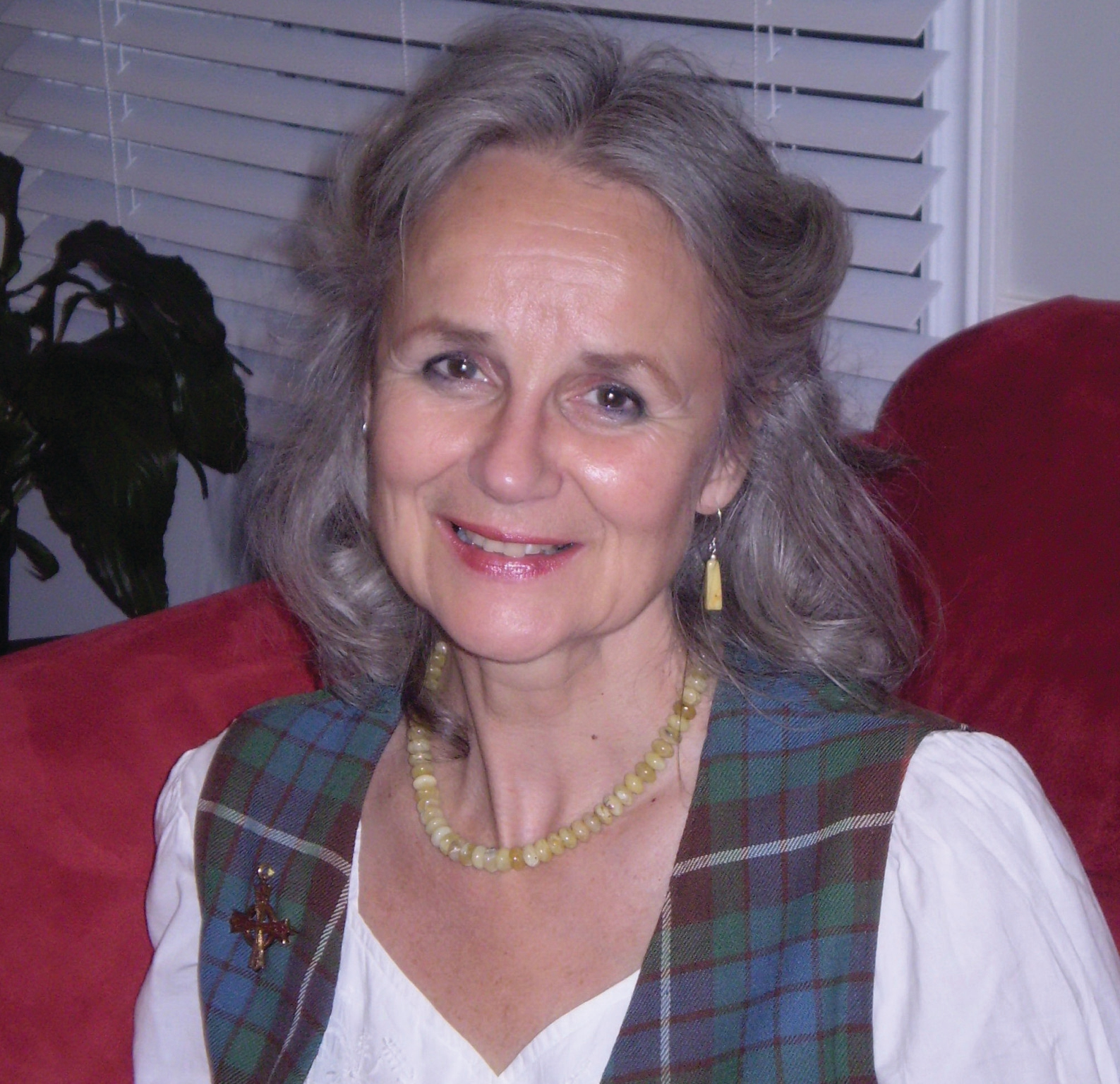
- Bennett in 2006
- Born: 27 October 1946 (age 79); Isle of Skye, Inverness-shire, Scotland
- Occupations: Folklorist, academic, author, singer
- Children: Martyn Bennett

Academic background
- Education: University of Strathclyde; Memorial University of Newfoundland; University of Edinburgh
- Thesis: Hebridean Traditions of the Eastern Townships of Quebec: A Study in Cultural Identity (1994)

Academic work
- Institutions: Museum of Man, Quebec; Scottish Education Department; School of Scottish Studies, University of Edinburgh; Royal Conservatoire of Scotland
- Main interests: Scottish folk culture and cultural identity, Scottish diaspora
- Website: margaretbennett.co.uk

Margaret Bennett (born 27 October 1946) is a Scottish, writer, folklorist, ethnologist, broadcaster, and singer. Having spent much of her life living between Scotland and Canada, her work concerns traditional Scottish folk culture and the cultural identity of the Scots abroad. Her close friend and mentor, the Scottish poet Hamish Henderson, considered Bennett "one of the major figures of the modern Scottish revival...Margaret embodies all that is best of the spirit of Scotland".

== Biography ==
Margaret Bennett grew up in a family of tradition bearers: Gaelic, from her mother's side, and Irish and Lowland Scots from her father's. She and her three sisters lived their childhood in the Isle of Skye, "in a household where singing, playing music, dancing and storytelling were a way of life as were traditional crafts." The family moved to the Isle of Lewis in the late 1950s, and then to the Shetland Islands between 1963 and 1964, when her father (a civil engineer) emigrated to Newfoundland, Canada. When visiting him in 1965, she came across the newly founded Folklore Department at Memorial University of Newfoundland. There, under the direction of Prof. Herbert Halpert, she realised that her cultural heritage "was a subject you could actually study and get a degree in."

After finishing her teacher training in Scotland with distinction, Bennett returned to Newfoundland, where she worked as an elementary school teacher in St. John's between 1967 and 1968. From 1968 she attended the University, intermittently lecturing part-time at St. John's Vocational College, then, in 1975, earned a post-graduate MA from M.U.N. She spent a year in Quebec as folklorist for the Museum of Man (now Canadian Museum of Civilization, across the Ottawa River) before returning to Scotland. Between 1977 and 1984, she worked as a special education teacher in the Scottish Education Department. From 1984 to 1995, she was lecturer in Scottish Ethnology at the School of Scottish Studies of the University of Edinburgh. In 1988, she was involved in the re-initiation of the Beltane Fire Festival on Calton Hill, Edinburgh. Since October 1995 she has been Glasgow Honorary Research Fellow of the University of Glasgow (attached to Glasgow-Strathclyde School of Scottish Studies) and lecturer in folklore at the Royal Conservatoire of Scotland in Glasgow.

She is the mother of the late Martyn Bennett.

== Academic life ==
- 1967: Dip Ed (Distinction), Jordanhill College of Education (University of Strathclyde), Glasgow.
- 1970: she received a BA(Ed) in Education from the Memorial University of Newfoundland at St. John's.
- 1975: she earned a post-graduate MA in Folklore from M.U.N. defending her thesis "Some Aspects of the Scottish Gaelic Traditions of the Codroy Valley, Newfoundland", where she records and analyses the traditions of the Gaelic-speaking settlers in the Codroy Valley.
- 1994: she achieved a PhD in Ethnology from the University of Edinburgh with a thesis entitled "Hebridean Traditions of the Eastern Townships of Quebec: A Study in Cultural Identity".

== Works ==
- The Last Stronghold: Scottish Gaelic Traditions in Newfoundland (Canada's Atlantic Folklore-folklife series). Canongate Books Ltd, Breakwater Books Ltd, 1989 / ISBN 0-86241-197-1 - ISBN 978-0-86241-197-8, ISBN 0-920911-38-2 - ISBN 978-0-920911-38-9
- Oatmeal and the Catechism: Scottish Gaelic Settlers in Quebec (Mcgill-Queen's Studies in Ethnic History). McGill Queens University Press, Birlinn, 1999, 2002, 2004. ISBN 0-7735-1810-X – ISBN 978-0-7735-1810-0,ISBN 0-85976-574-1, ISBN 978-0-85976-574-9, ISBN 0-85976-461-3 - ISBN 978-0-85976-461-2, ISBN 0-7735-1810-X – ISBN 978-0-7735-1810-0, ISBN 0-7735-2775-3
- Scottish Customs from the Cradle to the Grave. Polygon, Birlinn Ltd, 1993, 1998, 2004. ISBN 978-1-84158-293-1, ISBN 978-0-7486-6118-3.
- Then another thing-Remembered in Perthshire: reminiscences, rhymes, games, songs and stories. (With Doris Rougvie) Perth & Kinross Council Educations Services, 2000. ISBN 0-905452-31-3 - ISBN 978-0-905452-31-9
- Recollections of an Argyllshire Drover: And Other Selected Papers Eric Cregeen (ed. Margaret Bennett). John Donald Publishers Ltd, 2004. ISBN 0-85976-575-X – ISBN 978-0-85976-575-6
- 'See when You look Back…' Clydeside Reminiscences of the Home Front, 1939–45. The Mitchell Library, 2005. ISBN 0-906169-58-5
- 'It's Not the Time You Have...': Notes and Memories of Music-Making with Martyn Bennett. Grace Note Publications, 2006. ISBN 0-9552326-1-9 - ISBN 978-0-9552326-1-9

== Discography ==
- Love and Loss – Remembering Martyn in Scotland's Music, 2007
- Take the road to Aberfeldy, 2007
- Glen Lyon, 2002
- In the sunny long ago..., 2000 (all arrangements and production by Margaret and Martyn Bennett)

== Prizes, Honours and Homages (main) ==
- Michaelis-Jena Ratcliff Folklore Prize (1991, for her book The Last Stronghold)
- The Scotch Malt Whisky Society Award (1994)
- The Donald Fergusson International Essay Prize (1995) for her study of Gaelic Song in Eastern Canada
- Master Music Maker Award (1998)
- The Clio Award for Quebec, Canadian Historical Association/Société historique du Canada (1999, for her book Oatmeal and the Catechism)
- Exceptional Celtic Woman Award from Celtic Women International, (2003)
- Honorary Life Membership of the Traditional Music and Song Association of Scotland (2007)
- Honorary Degree Doctor of Music (DMus) from The University of St Andrews in recognition of her major contribution to folklore and ethnology, and her outstanding career in broadcasting, singing and writing (2023)
