= Dyce Academy =

Coordinates: 57°12′19.74″N 2°10′26.73″W

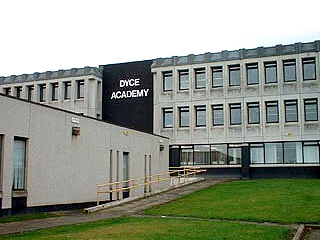
- The exterior of the school from Riverview Drive.

Location
- Riverview Drive; Dyce, Aberdeen, AB21 7NF; Scotland

Information
- Type: Secondary school
- Established: 1980
- Local authority: Aberdeen City Council
- Head teacher: Katie Arthur
- Staff: 90 (approx)
- Gender: Co-educational
- Age: 11 to 18
- Enrolment: 560
- Houses: Kirkhill , Ramsay , Brimmond , Corby
- Colours: Black, white and red
- School years: S1-S6
- Website: Dyce Academy

Dyce Academy is the only state secondary school in Dyce, a small suburb of Aberdeen, serving as the sole provider of secondary education in the area. Dyce Academy's catchment area includes Dyce and the nearby village of Newmachar, though some pupils do attend from other nearby areas such as Bucksburn.

The school's construction began in the late 1970s and was completed in 1980. The building has typical architecture of state schools of this period, with concrete in abundance. The main section of the building has three floors hosting various departments whilst the Physical Education, Drama, Technical and Music departments are in various "wings" which come off of the building.

== Uniform ==
Dyce Academy has for most its existence, been a uniform-free school. However, following the retirement of Michael Taylor, the original head teacher of the school, in 2008, a dress code of black and white was introduced the following year. There is a red and blue striped tie which is now compulsory for all pupils.

== Aberdeen City Music School ==
Aberdeen City Music School (ACMS) has been based at Dyce Adademy since 2001. One of six centres of excellence – schools which allow gifted children to maximise their potential (four for music and one each for dance and sport). ACMS selects a small number of pupils who show a special ability in music. Admission is by audition. Each centre of excellence is located within a comprehensive school (Dyce Academy) from which pupils receive normal academic classes. Students are attracted from within the local region and even nationally. ACMS provides boarding facilities beside the school for pupils who come from more than three miles away.

== MICAS ==
Dyce Academy has had a department named MICAS (Mainstream Integration of Children on the Autistic Spectrum) since 1997. The goal of the base, according to the school, is to provide specialized education for students with Asperger's syndrome and high-functioning autism, while still enrolling them in "usually between 65% and 95%" of their original timetable.

== 2025 fire ==
A fire occurred on the first floor of Dyce Academy on the night of 18 February 2025. Around 60 firefighters attended the incident, which heavily damaged a small number of classrooms. Police Scotland are treating the fire as a deliberate act of arson. The school was closed for the remainder of the week, and reopened in phases on 24 and 25 February.

== Notable former pupils ==
- Roy McBain - footballer
- Mark McDonald - former member of the Scottish Parliament
