= Martyn Bennett =

Canadian-Scottish musician (1971–2005)

- Born: 17 February 1971; St. John's, Newfoundland and Labrador, Canada
- Died: 30 January 2005 (aged 33) Edinburgh, Scotland
- Genres: Celtic fusion, electronic, dance
- Instruments: Great Highland Bagpipes; Scottish smallpipes; violin; piano
- Years active: 1995–2005
- Labels: Real World; Footstompin'; Rykodisc
- Website: www.martynbennett.com

Martyn Bennett (17 February 1971 – 30 January 2005) was a Canadian-Scottish musician who was influential in the evolution of modern Celtic fusion, a blending of traditional Celtic and modern music. He was a piper, violinist, composer and producer. Diagnosis of serious illness at the age of thirty curtailed his live performances, although he completed a further two albums in the studio. He died from cancer in 2005, fifteen months after the release of his fifth album Grit.

== Early life ==
He was born Martyn Bennett-Knight in St. John's, Newfoundland and Labrador, Canada. His father, Ian Knight, was a Welsh geologist and musician. His mother was Margaret Bennett, a singer and folklorist who was born on Skye. His grandfather, George Bennett, was also an enthusiastic piper.

Martyn Bennett spent the first five years of his life in the Codroy Valley, where Gaelic and traditional music were parts of the local culture. The family then moved to Quebec. However, his parents separated when he was six and his mother moved back to Scotland, taking him with her. They stayed briefly on Mull, before moving to Kingussie, where he had his first lessons in playing the Great Highland bagpipe from David Taylor, who was also his history teacher. By the age of twelve he was winning junior piping competitions.

== Education ==
At the age of fifteen he moved to Edinburgh with his mother. He won a place at the City of Edinburgh Music School, the first traditional musician to do so. During the three years that he studied there he also learned piano and violin. In 1990 he began violin and piano studies at the Royal Scottish Academy of Music and Drama (RSAMD) in Glasgow, where he met Kirsten Thomson, a piano student in the year above him, who joined him in a band and later became his wife. During the final year of his studies he was diagnosed with testicular cancer, but he recovered after six months of treatment and graduated in 1993.

== Career ==
Bennett played the pipes at the first Beltane Fire Festival on Calton Hill, Edinburgh, on 1 May 1988. He was influenced by the early 1990s dance music scene and regularly attended clubs. He worked with Martin Swan's Mouth Music project, combining traditional Gaelic songs and music with contemporary instruments. He made his debut at the Glasgow Royal Concert Hall on 14 January 1994 supporting them. Bennett was a teenager when Swan had first spotted him playing.He took part in the summer festival of the city of Nantes in historic Brittany (France) in July 1994, perhaps his first concert outside the UK.

He released his first album, the eponymous Martyn Bennett, in 1995 on Eclectic, a small Edinburgh-based independent label. He had recorded the album in just seven days at Castle Sound studios in Pencaitland. Floret Silva Undique uses a poem by Hamish Henderson, who commented "What brave new music". The album had a "dramatic" impact on Scottish music. He provided the live musical score for David Harrower's play Knives in Hens. He performed at the party held at Stirling Castle for the European premier of the movie Braveheart on 3 September 1995. He was back performing in the Glasgow Royal Concert Hall in January 1996. After writing scores for stage and television, he went on tour to America, supporting Wolfstone. He played at Edinburgh Hogmanay events in 1995 and 1996.

He released Bothy Culture in 1998 on the Rykodisc label. One composition Hallaig takes its name from the poem by the Gaelic bard Sorley MacLean, incorporating a sample of MacLean reading the poem. Bothy culture topped the US college radio charts. The album came close to winning a Mercury Music Prize nomination.

He sported dreadlocks, an image that fitted with the musical and cultural boundaries that he was crossing. At times he was characterised as "the techno piper". He played at T in the Park in 1998. Scottish celebrities attended his performance at the Buddha Bar in Paris, ahead of Scotland playing Brazil in the opening match of the 1998 World Cup. He was awarded the 1998 Glenfiddich Spirit of Scotland Award in the music category. He played at Celtic connections again in 1999. At Edinburgh's Hogmanay celebrations at the millennium, his band Cuillin played at the Castle Esplanade, supporting Texas.

In 1999 he moved to Mull, where he met Dundonian musician Martin Low who helped him with his next work. Rykodisc had now become part of Palm Pictures. In 2000 he released the album Hardland on his own Cuillin label. He appeared at the Cambridge Folk Festival in 2000, giving an electrifying performance. A reviewer wrote in Mojo that "Scots music has never sounded like this before. No music has ever sounded like this before. Half the audience fled in fear of their lives." Bennett sold a thousand CDs after the set.

The City of Edinburgh Music School commissioned him to write Mackay's Memoirs for the school's centenary in 1999. It was a piece for chamber orchestra featuring Great Highland bagpipes and harp. Mackay's Memoirs was played at the celebrations that took place in Princes Street Gardens, alongside the opening of the new Scottish Parliament in July 1999 and at the 2004 Mòd

He was diagnosed with Hodgkin's lymphoma in November 2000. Over the following eight months he received both chemotherapy and radiotherapy. In the following years his treatments would also include several major operations.

After this diagnosis he recorded his fourth album Glen Lyon which was first released on the Foot Stomping' label in 2002. It was a cycle of Gaelic songs, his mother singing and he accompanying her. Woven into this is a sample of Peter Stewart, his great-great-grandfather singing in 1910, taken from a wax cylinder recording.

He married Kirsten in February 2002. Following a relapse and an unexpected splenectomy in January of that year, Bennett proposed; the ceremony took place in her mother's kitchen. The couple moved back to Mull. Illness left him feeling disconnected from his music and one day, in a fit of rage, he destroyed many of his instruments – pipes, fiddles and whistles. Horrified at what he had done, he was unable to bring himself to speak to anyone for the following two days.

The final album that he recorded, Grit, was released in October 2003 on Real World Records. It had been recorded while he was ill, and he was unable to play his instruments. He brought together samples of unaccompanied traditional Scottish folk singers, his own bagpipe and fiddle playing, with electronic drum beats. For Move, the opening track, he sampled a recording of traditional singer Sheila Stewart performing the Moving On Song, Ewan MacColl's song about travellers; she was delighted that he was taking it to a new audience. His song Liberation featured Michael Marra narrating an English translation of psalm 118. The album has been "credited with starting the musical evolution of Celtic fusion". On 10 December 2003 BBC Two Scotland aired an ArtWorks Scotland documentary titled Martyn Bennett: Grit.

== Death and legacy ==
Bennett died from cancer at the Marie Curie Hospice, Edinburgh on 30 January 2005, aged 33. News of his death spread among those attending the last night of Celtic Connections. The news was held back from the Edinburgh Music School pupils who were recording Mackay's Memoirs the following day. His funeral was held on Mull.

A memorial concert was held at The Queen's Hall, Edinburgh, on 15 April. Around the same time the Martyn Bennett Trust was set up by his family and friends, as a commemorative fund to help young musicians. The 2006 Celtic Connections programme included a Martyn Bennett Day, held on 14 January, with events to celebrate his work. Toccata for Small Hands, written by Bennett for Kirsten, was performed in public for the first time. Greg Lawson was commissioned to score an arrangement of Liberation. Cuillin Music reformed to perform at the event. After Bennett's death, the band preferred to rework material instead of reproducing it. In June 2006, a book It's Not the Time You Have ... was launched which contained recollections of Bennett, compiled by his mother.

On 27 October 2007 an event was held at The Queen's Hall. This event was organised by the Martyn Bennett Trust, with musicians invited to workshops during the day, finishing with a concert in the evening.

In 2008 Margaret Bennett released a CD single, Love and Loss, with three tracks where Bennett played to accompany his mother's singing; two of the tracks were previously unreleased. Mr McFall's Chamber, a string quartet from the Scottish Chamber Orchestra, toured with a tribute show Aye: An Affirmation of Martyn Bennett, performing pieces that were inspired by Bennett and his work. The tour began in Perth on 18 March and ended on 29 March in Findhorn. A further performance was part of the 2008 Edinburgh International Festival.

In March 2012 an anthology was released on the Long Tale Recordings label, entitled Aye. The album consisted of remastered tracks and some new material, compiled by the Martyn Bennett Trust.

In 2013 Creative Scotland announced they would fund an annual prize for new music composition, named in his honour.

A stage show, Grit: The Martyn Bennett Story, was created as part of the 2014 Commonwealth Games cultural programme. Conceived by Cora Bissett, it was written by Kieran Hurley. Bisset directed the show, having worked in close collaboration with his friends and family to create the show. It premiered at the Tramway in Glasgow in May 2014, then was performed in Mull. It was named event of the year at the 2014 Scots Trad Music Awards. Real World Records label re-released Grit to coincide with the stage show.

Greg Lawson, who had been friends with Bennett and who scored Liberation for a performance at Celtic Connections in 2006, went on to recreate Grit with an orchestral score for live performance. Lawson spent more than a year working on Nae Regrets, working out how an orchestra might recreate Bennett's precise arrangements. He assembled eighty musicians to form the Grit orchestra. On 15 January 2015, just over a decade after Bennett's death, Lawson conducted the Grit orchestra at the Glasgow Royal Concert Hall, to perform the opening concert at Celtic Connections. The concert was later named as the event of the year at the 2015 Trad awards. A further performance was given on 23 August 2016 at the Edinburgh Playhouse as part of the 2016 Edinburgh International Festival. To celebrate the 20th anniversary of Bothy Culture, and the 25th anniversary of the Celtic Connections festival, Lawson and the orchestra, now containing some 100 traditional folk, classical and jazz musicians, performed the show Bothy Culture and Beyond at the SSE Hydro, Glasgow on 27 January 2018.

In 2024, Luath Press published Brave New Music: The Martyn Bennett Story, a biography written by the piper and folklorist Gary West.

== Discography ==
- Martyn Bennett (1995)
- Bothy Culture (1997)
- Hardland (with Martin Low) (2000)
- Glen Lyon (with his mother, Margaret Bennett, on vocals) (2002)
- Grit (2003)
- Mackay's Memoirs (performed by City of Edinburgh Music School) (2005)
- Love and Loss (with his mother, Margaret Bennett, and Cameron Drummond) (2008)

=== Compilations ===
- Aye (2012)
