= Croftwork =

Studio album by Peatbog Faeries
- Released: 25 April 2005
- Recorded: 2005
- Studio: Phat Controller Productions, Roag, Isle of Skye
- Genre: Celtic fusion; Celtic jazz; experimental
- Length: 56:49
- Label: Peatbog Records
- Producer: Calum McLean; Iain Copeland

Peatbog Faeries chronology
Welcome to Dun Vegas (2003)	Croftwork (2005)	What Men Deserve to Lose (2007)

Croftwork (stylised on the album cover as CroftworK) is the fourth album by Scottish Celtic fusion group Peatbog Faeries, recorded in Roag on the Isle of Skye, and released in 2005 on the band's own Peatbog Records label. It was released as the label's second album following on from the band's previous album Welcome to Dun Vegas (2003). They recorded the album at Phat Controller Productions on the band's native Isle of Skye.

The album sees the band combine a wide variety of sounds, and also introduced a prominent brass section (The Wayward Boys) which critics said gave parts of the album a jazz feel. Music on the album includes experiments with electronica and dance music, jazz, including subgenres such as lounge-jazz, funk and Latin. The album was released in October 2005 and received positive reviews from fans and critics alike. One of the album's most popular tracks, "The Anthropologist", often opened the band's live shows in 2008.

== Background and recording ==
After recording their electronica-influenced second album Faerie Stories in 1999, Peatbog Faeries encountered problems when the record label registered to release the album, Astor Place Recordings, closed due to bankruptcy. When the album was finally released in June 2001 on their previous label Greentrax Recordings, the band had decided it would be easier to set up their own label, Peatbog Records, for which they recorded their third album Welcome to Dun Vegas (2003). Welcome to Dun Vegas marked another stark, stylistic shift in the band's sound, featuring a wide range of influences, such as African music as well as experimental effects including backwards drumming and a track based around a kitchen cooker timer. It also marked the first time the band used vocals, and whilst only a small amount is featured, the last two tracks feature the vocal group The Veganites. In addition to touring the album throughout 2003 on the band's regular folk festival routine, the band also performed a low-key performance at Glastonbury Festival, prompting one NME journalist to note "I wanted to check out R.E.M. but sorry guys, it's your misfortune to be on at the same time as The Peatbog Faeries, the highlight of Glastonbury. Mere earth words can't do the Faeries justice...".

The enthusiastic reaction to the band only prompted enthusiasm for their subsequent album, Croftwork. The distance between recording Welcome to Dun Vegas and the new album became the shortest yet. Seeking a new musical direction, they enlisted several guest musicians for Croftwork, and recorded it in 2005 at Phat Controller Productions in Roag, Isle of Skye, with co-production between the band's longtime production duo of Calum MacLean and the band's percussionist Iain Copeland. The album was mastered by Denis Blackham of Skye Mastering. The band announced the album in 2005.

== Music ==
=== Musical style ===
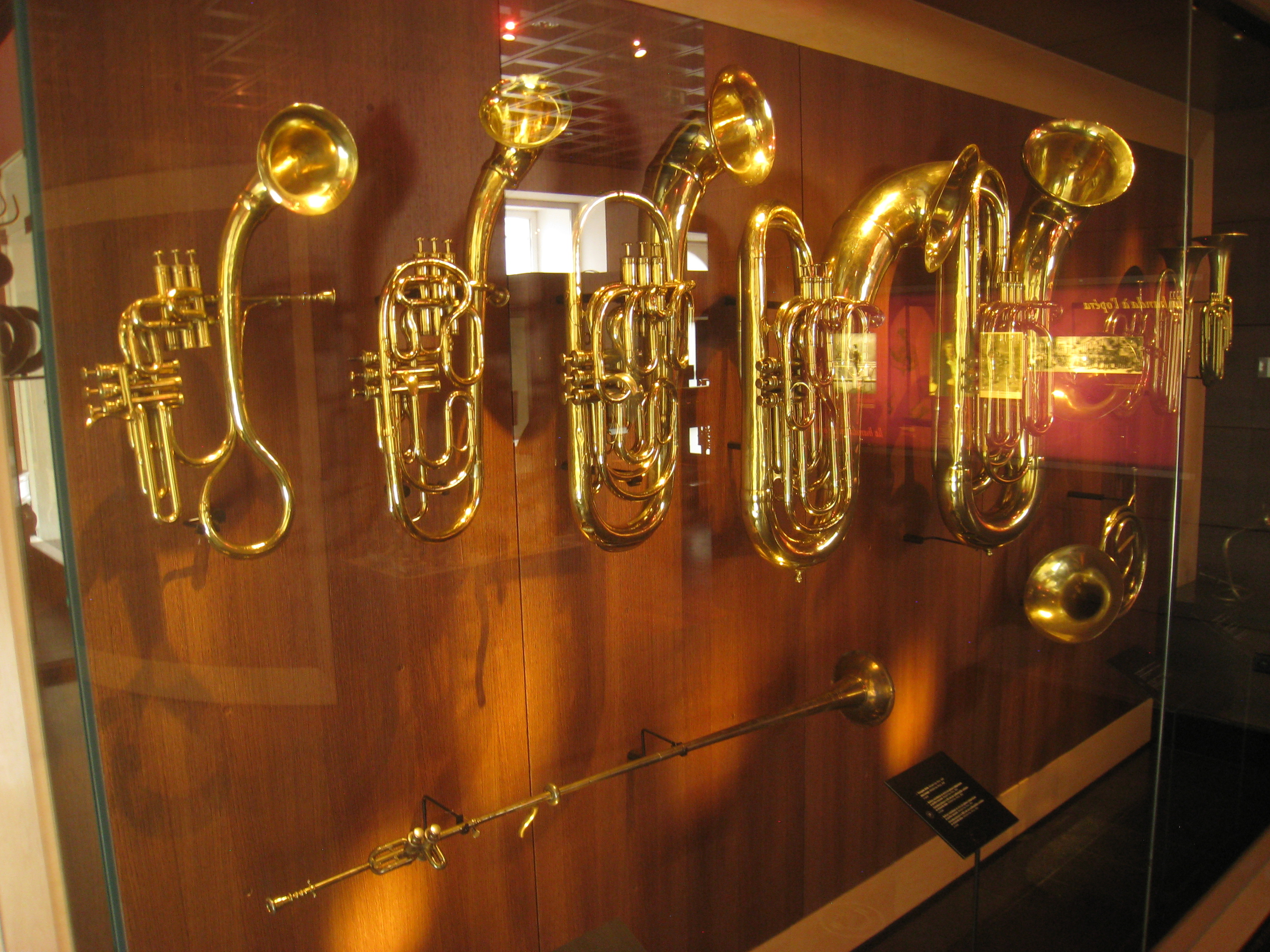
In addition to the album's variety of genres and styles, a prominent brass section features on Croftwork alongside the Celtic instrumentalism.

Croftwork was described by its press-hand out as "everything you've ever heard from the band in the past with a distinctly new sound for now" and by the band's website as "their most ambitious and dynamic offering to date." The "ambitious" and "dynamic" album is characterised by its "rich and varied instrumental maelstrom" and has been described as "slicker, funkier, harder hitting, and slightly less chaotic" than previous albums by the band. fRoots commented that the "unapologetic" album runs "from hi-tech drizzle reeling to plaintive electronic airs." Luxury Web Magazine said the album displays "a sound that is rock, Celtic and jazz" and commented that "energy is the key to this release, and you feel it throughout all the tracks and through all the instruments."

Unlike previous albums, Croftwork introduces a prominent small brass section to the band, that of The Wayward Boys, a duo from Kilmarie consisting of Rick Taylor and Nigel Hitchcock, who play trombone and saxophone. InSuffolk.com noticed the brass instruments seemed to introduce a jazz element to the band's sound. When asked if "that was intentional or something which happened organically", the band's bassist and sometime percussionist Innes Hutton said the band "have never considered the brass lines as jazz really", adding that "jazz is another beast entirely" and that they "were looking for added texture and dynamic from them and hopefully [the band] achieved that." Reviewer David Kidman also acknowledged the band "added the sound of brass to the mix with a mini-horn-section (trombone and sax) spicing up the already pretty full group sound, and to bristlingly good effect", highlighting title track as being a good example, "which is boldly heralded in by what might be a radio news call-sign and then pursues its quarry in the style of a contemporary Scottish-set crime-action-movie soundtrack complete with exotic touches of instrumentation and cinematically lush textures." The track has eerie, darkly hypnotic contributions from pipes & a fiddle, and has been compared to the work of Martyn Bennett.

=== Tracks ===
The album's opening track, "Scots on the Rocks", was described by one reviewer as being "like a Battlefield Band lift, until the cavalry arrives in the shape of huge granite rhythms and honking brass riding a funk groove." The fourth track, "The Anthropologist", was described as "probably the funkiest slice of strutting the Faeries have ever committed to CD, with a brazen jazzy swagger that propels it along the streetwise beat like nobody's business" and as having a punchy funky Latin feel. Both "When the Seahound Left Me" and "All About Windmills" are akin to lounge jazz, with the former being described by one critic as "could have come fresh from a Nathan Hines album before surging into a plaintive fiddle led lament" whilst the latter was described as presenting "presents an engaging series of jig-time variations with solo breaks and lush ensemble sections."

"Trans Island Express", whose name is a nod to either Kraftwerk's seminal 1977 album Trans Europe Express, its title track or the former railway service of the same name, features elements of "world music static filtering through the transmission distortion, soon zooming right on down to earth and trundling along its track rather stylishly." If the name of the song reflects the Kraftwerk piece, then the album name Croftwork could reflect their name Kraftwerk. "Decisions, Decisions/Kevin O'Neill", which runs to almost ten minutes, is also considered "spacey" and "a gentle nocturne for acoustic guitar and weirdness ... coupled to a driving fiddle reel with more weirdness" whilst "The Great Ceilidh Swindle", "Veganites" and "The Drone Age" are dancier numbers. "The Drone Age" has been described as "updating the Third Ear Band with a similarly hypnotic modern-day trance beat, taking it further into filmic terrain with added vocal nuances" by one reviewer, whilst another described it as "just strange". "Veganites" shares its name with the vocal group The Veganites who sing appear on two tracks on the band's previous albums, and they are thanked in the "thanks to" mentions in the Croftwork liner notes.

== Release and reception ==
Croftwork was released by the band's own label Peatbog Records on 25 April 2005 as the band's fourth album, and the label's second release. The album title is believed to be a reference to the pioneering German electronic band Kraftwerk in a similar way to how "Trans Island Express" from the album is believed to be a reference to the band's album Trans Europe Express, or its title song. The album was dedicated to the memory of Kathryn Beattie. Upon release it became the band's second longest studio album behind only Faerie Stories, which is just under 11 minutes longer, although it has since been overtaken by both Dust and Blackhouse, the band's most recent albums. The album cover features a close up of a cow whilst its back cover features a digitally altered, colour negative photograph of a bridge crossing a main road. The album is one of two albums by the band to not give descriptions to any of the tracks in the booklet, following their debut album Mellowosity. Nonetheless, the landscape imagery in the booklet is reminiscent of the booklets for Welcome to Dun Vegas and What Men Deserve to Lose.

The album was well received by critics. Alex Monaghan of The Living Tradition said that "the whole Croftwork thing is an enjoyable diversion from musical convention, full of surprises but still loosely tied to its pipe and fiddle heritage." Simon Jones of fRoots said that "Croftwork is intelligence and daring wrapped in an Aladdin's Cave of possibilities. No bull. If Shooglenifty are Scots fusion pushing into wider world styles, then Peatbog Faeries are happy to be Scots pushing their own style into the wide world." Jones' review concluded "Your home will be the poorer for not owning this joyful, playful, energetic wonder." J. C. Hartley of Soundcheck Music Review compared it to Faerie Stories, saying: "Faerie Stories is more traditional, that is a track starts as a wee jig or a reel or a pibroch then takes off into new glens; Croftwork takes that expectation but funks it up big time almost right away; think slap bass and bagpipes."

David Kidman was also very favourable, noting "On first playthrough I thought a couple of the tracks were a mite relentless, at least on initial acquaintance, and with the latter half of the album the Faeries certainly seem to get more into their experimental stride, but second playthrough and a neat cranking-up of the volume enabled me to appreciate the serious dance grooves and the inventive majesty of the complex sound-picture so much better. Brilliant - so get right in there and lie back to dance!" He also noted "the joy here is that the Faeries still retain an element of surprise and innovation in their treatments of the traditional-sounding dance tunes created by band members". Edward F. Nesta of Luxury Web Magazine reviewed the album, saying "The band continues to inspire each other to new levels, and you can hear it on this release, and WOW is it worth it – walk, run or let your fingers do the walking on the Internet, but give Croftwork a listen."

The band toured the album in 2005 and 2006 and were quicker than before to work on a follow album, releasing What Men Deserve to Lose in June 2007. A live album of tracks from two of the performances from the tour that had promoted that album was released as Live in 2009. Live features three tracks from Croftwork performed live, opening with "The Anthropologist" as many of the band's performances from the tour did, whilst "Decisions, Decisions/Kevin O'Neill of Rutherglen" appears as the eighth track and "All About Windmills" closes the album on track eleven, as it does with Croftwork.

The band won "Live Act of the Year 2005" at the Scottish Trad Music Awards.

== Track listing ==
1. "Scots on the Rocks" – 4:34
2. "Weakened" – 4:03
3. "Croftwork" – 4:25
4. "The Anthropologist" – 4:33
5. "When the Seahound Left Me" – 5:48
6. "Decisions, Decisions / Kevin O'Neill of Rutherglen" – 9:38
7. "Veganites" – 3:55
8. "Trans Island Express" – 5:01
9. "The Great Ceilidh Swindle" – 4:08
10. "Drone Age" – 5:37
11. "All About Windmills" – 5:01
