= Dust (Peatbog Faeries album) =

Studio album by Peatbog Faeries
- Released: 8 August 2011
- Recorded: 2011
- Studios: Orbost and Cumbernauld College, Scotland
- Genres: Celtic fusion; world fusion; experimental; electronica; ambient; psychedelic
- Length: 60:48
- Label: Peatbog Records
- Producer: Calum MacLean

Peatbog Faeries chronology
What Men Deserve to Lose (2007)	Dust (2011)	Blackhouse (2015)

Dust is the sixth studio album by the Scottish Celtic fusion band Peatbog Faeries, released on 8 August 2011 on Peatbog Records, although pre-release copies were released on 20 July 2011 through the band's online shop. Following the band's 2008 tour and subsequent live album, the band's fiddle player Adam Sutherland and drummer Iain Copeland left the band, replaced by Peter Tickell and Stu Haikney respectively whose experience helped stir the band in a new direction. The band set to record Dust in 2011 with longtime producer Calum MacLean, beginning work in Orbost and concluding work at Cumbernauld College. Haikney brought experimental fiddle techniques to the band, and similarly experimental production techniques, whilst the entire band experimented with various genres of music including African music, funk, reggae, ambient music and electronic music alongside the band's traditional Celtic fusion sound. The brass sound of previous albums also returned. The album was also an attempt to translate the band's live sound to studio work.

Dust was released to positive reviews from critics, with The Guardian noting "Peatbog Faeries provide another reminder of the strength and variety of the Scottish music scene", The band's supporting tour also earned them a nomination at the BBC Radio 2 Folk Awards for Best Live Act. Producer Calum MacLean later described producing the album as "the best musical experience of [his] life."

== Background and release ==
Rumours of the band's sixth studio album started to circulate after the release of the band's Live album in 2009, which records performances from two of the band's gigs as part of their summer 2008 tour in support of their previous album What Men Deserve to Lose (2007). The band's drummer Iain Copeland, who also co-produced the band's six albums with Calum MacLean, left the band in 2010, whilst the band's fiddle player Adam Sutherland left around the same time. Their departures left a hole in the band. Nonetheless, prior to Dust, fiddle player Peter Tickell, who "brings his own dynamics and youthful enthusiasm to the band", and drummer Stu Haikney who "brings a vast store of experience" joined the band and made their debut appearance on Dust. Tickell had indeed worked as a dep for Sutherland so his role as successor was seen as natural. Haikney was described by one biography as being "furiously fast".

Following many rumours, evidence of recording came to light as the band released images of their work in the studio in early 2011. Dust was officially announced in June 2011 via the band's website and Facebook page as the title of the new album. The album cover and track listing were released in July 2011 and pre-release copies were released on 20 July on the band's online shop. It was officially released elsewhere on 8 August. The band spoke to Mary Ann Kennedy about the album in a live nine-minute interview on BBC Radio Scotland on 24 August.

Dust was the first studio album by Peatbog Faeries to be released in a digipak, and the second Peatbog Faeries album to do so whatsoever, after Live. As with all Peatbog Faeries album, small descriptions for the songs can be found in the liner notes. The album cover, which incorporates an artwork entitled It's Magic, is strikingly similar to the cover of Evil Heat by Primal Scream. Dust clocks in at over sixty minutes and is the second longest Peatbog Faeries studio album, behind Faerie Stories which is approximately seven minutes longer, and their third longest album overall after Live which lasts seventy-six minutes long.

== Production ==
=== Recording ===
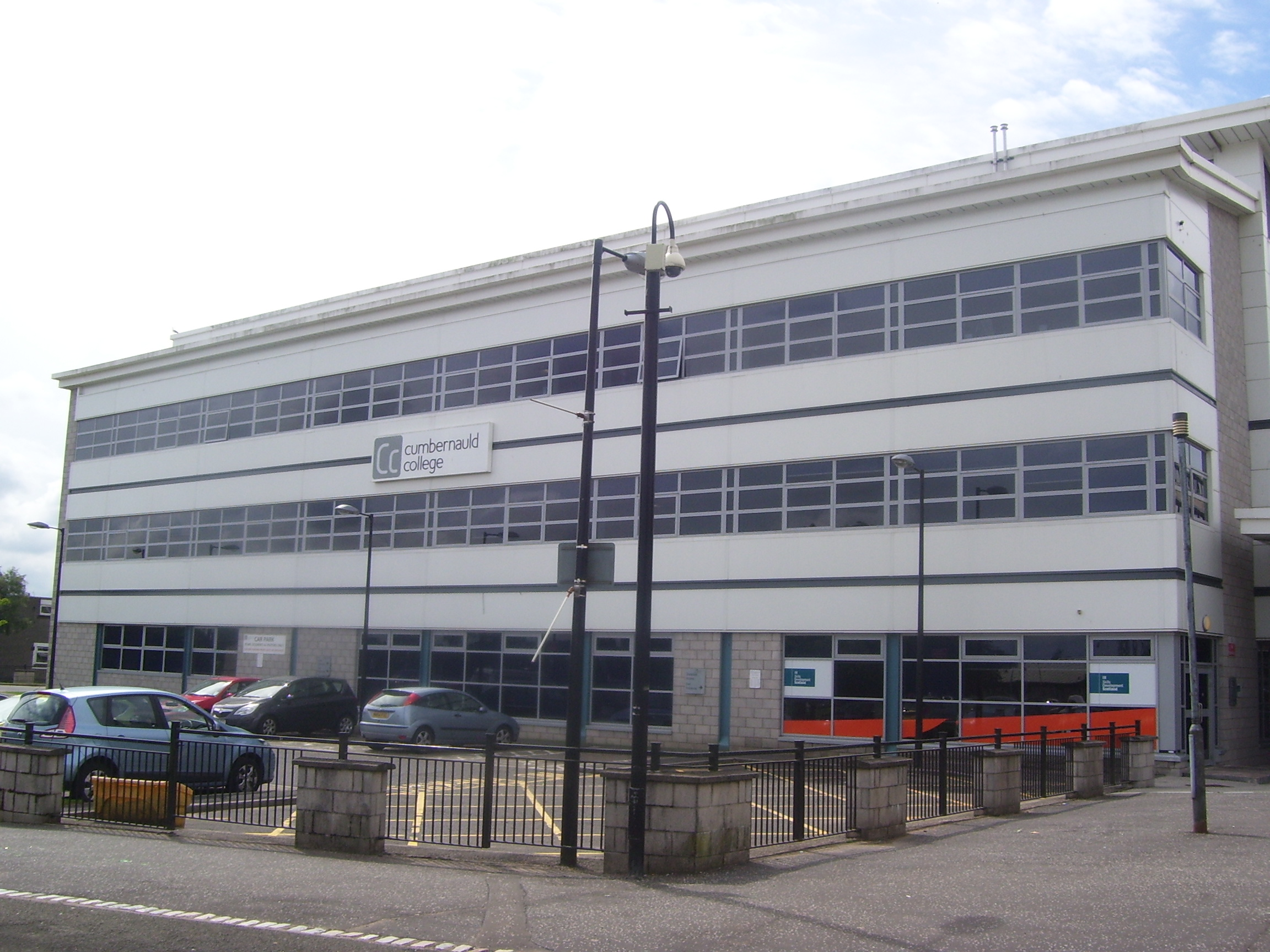
Part of the album was recorded at Cumbernauld College (pictured).

The band hired long time co-producer Calum McLean to produce the album who later described working on the album as "the best musical experience of [his] life." The band "wanted to bring a bit more of the live feel to the album and that [listeners] could also really hear the band playing". The music on the album had been "gathered up" for two or three years prior to the album, as the band wanted to be in a situation where they had "an excess of material to choose from". The melodies were written by band members Peter Morrison and Peter Tickell who would meet up in several locations on the band's native Isle of Skye, mostly in Orbost, and try out ideas, this location forming the first part of the album's recording. The band prioritised live takes as the starting point for the album.

The new fiddle player Peter Tickell had been depping for his predecessor Adam Sutherland for approximately four years, so his turn as the successor to Sutherland was described as "natural" by the band. Tickell writes a large variety of music, which encompasses a lot styles, and the band had "masses of tunes to choose from" that he put forward. Tickell was also noted as bringing a standard of professionalism to the band having played as part of Sting's backing band. Stu Haikney replaced the band's long time drummer, Iain Copeland who left in 2010. Though Copeland's departure "left a big hole to fill", the inaugural run-through that the band had with Haikney left the band surprised to see that he had "written everything out" and thus he counted the band in and "off [they went]." Tickell's affinity with technology had already been used to great effect on the band's live performances and got "completely immersed" when it came to recording Dust. Tickell was noted for his experimental fiddle techniques, having been noted that he could not "stop buying effect pedals", but on the album, himself and producer Calum MacLean "got into recording things", with Tickell playing many individual notes on the fiddle and assigning each to a channel on the desk, followed by MacLean playing the string parts using the faders on the desk.

The final takes of the album were recorded at Cumbernauld College. The band described their experience there as about taking them out their comfort zone and "having to work really hard." The band also asked the students to dress up in laboratory coats to look the part, but they were "also fast to learn and always willing to be helpful." The band enjoyed working the students and picked four of them to take part in the engineering process. During the band's stay at the college, MacLean kept tabs on "everything that was going on." Each track was assigned a sheet where all the work that had been done to that track had been logged, so by looking at the sheet it was possible to see how far along the track had been developed. Members were not allowed to work on a track unless they had the sheet, so the sheets were "flying round all the different studios."

=== Music ===
The band took a new direction with the album, and as Folk Radio described it, "there were many new approaches on the album which set it apart from their other work. Some were very original, not just down to new studio techniques but also doing final takes in the studios of Cumbernauld College." The band "wanted to bring a bit more of the live feel to the album and that [listeners] could also really hear the band playing". The album's sound was described by Alex Monaghan as being "in some ways it marks a return to their Mellowosity days, with electronic backtracks underlying relatively traditional themes repeated hypnotically. However, the PBF of today is much slicker and studio-savvy than the fresh-faced fellas on that first album. That's not to say they've lost their freshness and spark: their music may now be dressed in linen and cashmere rather than homespun wool, but the pattern is still tartan and tweed, and the colours still hit you between the eyes like a musket ball." Allmusic said the album "saw the band return to a somewhat more ambient sound". The album has melodies inspired by idyllic places in Scotland whilst the inspiration behind "The Naughty Step" was described by Peter Morrison as after the band's trombonist Rick "had done something naughty... everybody laughs. "Like, he dank most of the rider." Graham said, "look, Rick, that's you on the naughty step. You've done such and such."" Festivals for All also noted that, with Dust, a vocal element began developing in the band's sound. When they interviewed bassist Innes Hutton, he said "we’ve always had debates within the band whether we should develop more along that line and in the future we might do more projects with singers and others and develop something original with them."

Northern Irish piper Jarlath Henderson contributed piping to several tracks such as "The Naughty Step" and the album's closing track "Room 215", a track which combines elements of African music, territory that had explored in different styles on their third album Welcome to Dun Vegas (2003), and was also described as "Caribbean craziness" by one reviewer. "Dun Brae", named after a broch on Skye, an ancient pre-Celtic tower associated with faerie folk, starts with a funky guitar intro, followed by slow fiddle and banjo, before a whistle and fiddle play a catchy minor jig. Drums and electronic effects follow and the pipes take up the melody with pipe band style percussion. This is followed by a host of synthesized sounds mimic seagulls, weather, radio, whales and other maritime phenomena, a drop back to electric guitar and congas, a South Pacific soundscape, then gentle fiddle reminiscent of Fingal's Cave, then it finishes. The album contains gentler tracks such as "Spigel and Nongo" and "Passport Panic", feistier tracks such as "Abhainn a'Nathair" and "The Naughty Step" and, as one reviewer described it, "extra weirdness" on "Marx Terrace".

== Reception ==
Professional ratings
Review scores
Source	Rating
Adrian Denning	(7/10)
Financial Times	4/5 stars
The Guardian	3/5 stars
The Herald	(mixed)
Living Tradition	(positive)
The Scotsman	3/5 stars

The band's website states that early reaction to the album suggests that it may be the band's "best album". Critics gave the album a positive reception. The album received a very positive response from Folk Radio UK, which also hosted a week-long preview of the album, together with an exclusive band interview. The Guardian gave Dust a three-star rating, despite noting the strength and innovation of the band's performance on the album. It was received positively by the Financial Times, and was featured as album of the week on Celtic Music Radio in Glasgow. Overall, the reception, bearing in mind that certain founding members have left the band, was positive. The album was Celtic Music Radio's "Album of the Week". "Room 215" featured as the seventh track on fRoots 37, a free compilation album of new world and folk music material covermount into issue 341–42 of fRoots. The track also appeared as the final track of the April 2014 Edition of the fRoots Radio playlist.

Robin Denselow of The Guardian was positive in his review, noting "Peatbog Faeries provide another reminder of the strength and variety of the Scottish music scene", further noting "there's an engagingly live feel to this latest all-instrumental set, which ranges from furious work-outs to more thoughtful mood pieces." Nonetheless, the review only rated the album three out of five stars, despite noting the strength and innovation of the band's performance on the album. The Scotsman said that Dust marked "Skye's psychedelic fusioneers return with a vengeance" and noted "their tightly delivered and all self-penned tunes on fiddle, pipes and whistle coming and going amid a blizzard of electronic beats and effects…. infectious, leap-about fun."

David Honigmann of the Financial Times awarded the album four out of five stars and said the band share more than just their initials with Pink Floyd, as "the footstamping Scottish fiddle-and-pipe instrumentals float above electronic effects, and Floyd fans will relish the echoes of the pounding bass stutter of “Dun Beag”, the kosmische swirling space rock intro of “Spiegel and Nongo” and the crazy-diamond cavern of “Marx Terrace”." Alex Monaghan of Living Tradition was positive about the album in his review and described the album as a "cracking good hour of new Scottish music altogether."

The band supported the album with many more gigs all around the United Kingdom, and Haikney incorporated sampling during the live performances. Almost three years after the album, the band continued to support the album live and Robin Denselow of The Guardian reviewed their performance at Passing Clouds, London, 7 July 2014, saying "Peatbog Faeries are one of the great Scottish festival bands. They are based in the Isle of Skye and play only instrumental compositions, but they have created a distinctive fusion, in which traditional influences are matched against anything from contemporary dance styles and funk to reggae and even echoes of African music." This performance followed a headlining appearance at the Avalon Stage of Glastonbury Festival. The band was nominated in 2012 for the "Best Live Act" award at the BBC Radio 2 Folk Awards, their first time nominated. The four-year wait between What Men Deserve to Lose and Dust was mirrored when it took Peatbog Faeries four years to follow up Dust with a new album, but the band's subsequent album, Blackhouse, is to be released on 25 May 2015.

== Track listing ==
1. "Calgary Capers" - 5:09
2. "The Naughty Step" - 5:37
3. "Dun Beag" - 6:15
4. "Spiegel and Nongo" - 6:02
5. "Passport Panic" - 6:09
6. "Abhainn a' Nathair" (River of Snakes) - 5:11
7. "Marx Terrace" - 6:30
8. "Bunny for Breakfast" - 4:06
9. "Ascent of Conival" - 4:45
10. "Fishing at Orbost" - 6:39
11. "Room 215" - 4:24

== Personnel ==
- Peter Morrison: pipes; whistles
- Peter Tickell: fiddle; effects
- Graeme Stafford: keyboards
- Stu Haikney: drums
- Tom Salter: guitars
- Innes Hutton: bass
- John Paterson: Recording Engineer
- Michael Callaghan: Recording Engineer
- Chris Hattie: Recording Engineer
- Peter Alexander Macdonald: Recording Engineer
- Calum Mclean: Producer/Mix Engineer
