= Blackhouse (album) =

Studio album by Peatbog Faeries
- Released: 25 May 2015
- Recorded: 2014–15, Kilchoan, Ardnamurchan, Scotland
- Genres: Celtic fusion; dance; experimental
- Length: 59:06
- Label: Peatbog Records
- Producer: Calum MacLean

Peatbog Faeries chronology
| Dust (2011) | Blackhouse (2015) |

Blackhouse is the seventh studio album by Scottish celtic fusion band Peatbog Faeries, released in May 2015 by the band's label Peatbog Records. After recording their acclaimed album Dust (2011), the band played live for the following few years, during which time fiddler Peter Tickell left the band, to be replaced by Ross Couper. As the band had not recorded an album for some years, they returned to record Blackhouse mainly in a cottage in Kilchoan, Ardnamurchan during 2014, although recording continued into 2015. Their first album with Couper, and their first without a brass section since Welcome to Dun Vegas (2003), Blackhouse was produced by Calum MacLean and displays a very eclectic array of genres, fusing the band's Scottish celtic roots with genres such as jazz, funk, reggae, dance and house.

The album was released to a very positive reception from music critics, who commended the array of music. One reviewer said the album was "a monumental homage to home, a sumptuous cavalier shot of bravado and experiment, which has undoubtedly assured the Peatbog Faeries individualism and taken them to the borders of lands unknown. Dazzling." The album was nominated for numerous year-end awards, including "Instrumental Album for the Year" at the Fatea Awards 2015, "Best Album from a Band" at Folk Worlds 2015 Album Awards and "Album of the Year" at the MG Alba Scots Trad Music Awards 2015.

== Background and recording ==
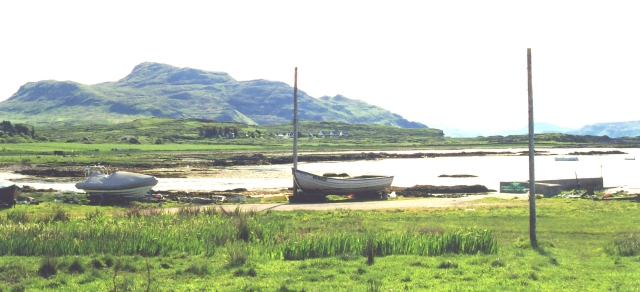
The album was recorded in Kilchoan (Kilchoan Bay pictured).

In 2011, Peatbog Faeries released their sixth studio album Dust to a glowing critical reception. Dust explored various genres including psychedelic music, ambient music, electronica and African music, and was their first album with fiddle player Peter Tickell, who "brings his own dynamics and youthful enthusiasm to the band", and drummer Stu Haikney who "brings a vast store of experience". The band supported the album with many more gigs all around the United Kingdom, which featured their percussionist Stu Haikney incorporating sampling during the live performances. The band had continued to play live throughout the following years. In 2012 they were nominated for the "Best Live Act" award at the BBC Radio 2 Folk Awards, their first time nominated, and in 2014 made a headlining appearance at the Avalon Stage of Glastonbury Festival.

During the touring, Tickell left the band, and was replaced by Ross Couper. Couper became a full member of the band but also spends time in a duo with guitar and flute musician Tom Oakes. The band noted that Couper "is always respectful of his native Shetland style and continues to look for new ways of playing exciting fiddle music in whatever guise you find him in." The brass section that the band had used since 2005, The Wayward Boys, also left the band. The band decided to carry on without a new brass section. Despite having toured for many years, the band had not released studio material since Dust. Folk Radio said that "although still very much part of the touring and festival scene since [Dust], studio output [from the band] has been in drought." After touring for much of 2014, they spent the end of the year recording their new album in a cottage in Kilchoan, Ardnamurchan, Scotland, although recording continued into 2015. The band's newsletter of May 2015 said the band had been recording the album for the previous two years. Pleased with Calum MacLean's production work for Dust, the band re-hired him to produce the new album. The duo "took [their] time" to record the album, enjoyed the Kilchoan surroundings, and "tried to have some fun along the way." Their recording location also inspired the album name, naming it Blackhouse after blackhouses, a traditional type of house which used to be common in the Scottish Highlands, the Hebrides, and Ireland.

== Music ==
=== Style ===
Blackhouse is an entirely instrumental album, containing ten original tracks which are heavily influenced by traditional music. Described by one reviewer as "eclectic with a capital 'E'," there are many musical influences displayed on the album. One reviewer said that "on a base of predominantly Scottish tradition", the album is overlaid with inspirations from everywhere. Jazz, funk, reggae and dance music influences "rub shoulders" with special effects and synths, tradition combines with visions, contemporary rocks along with heritage. Tim Carroll of FolkWorlds said that "the result is a fusion the band has unequivocally made its own. A sound that’s distinctive and individual. Music that force-feeds tradition with a sizeable dose of invention," which shows "interaction between the band members." Simon Jones of Spiral Earth called the album "fusion", where "intuitive roots meet dance floor/house beats with no small amount of craft and guile over the top. Their paths begin in Scots tradition the presence of fiddle, bagpipes and whistle never palls as the tracks lead them in myriad directions, sprinkling global colour and vibrancy all over the party." Ian Campbell of The Living Tradition said that "the style is unmistakeable, lead bagpipes see to that, but the content is varied and always rhythmically inventive."

According to David Kidman of Fatea Magazine, the absence of the band's previous brass section has "been the impetus for a fresh reappraisal of the exercise of group arrangement. Resulting in a tighter, somehow more intimate balance of elements, albeit a less expansive overall sound but one which draws the listener into the groove and locks it on down till the needle hits the runout. Both sensual and punchy - the time-honoured Peatbog hallmarks." Alan Morley of UK Folk Music said the album was a "studio" album because the band "is able to be absolutely in control of the sonic delights which are woven into each track. It’s almost like painting with sound and should be listened to loud in a darkened room where the depth and resonance works its way into your body and the melodies attack your consciousness."

=== Composition ===
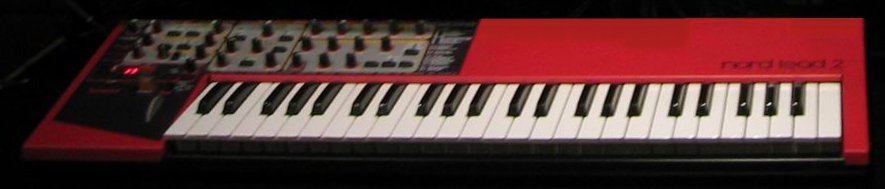
The album features different keyboard effects.

Opening track "Is This Your Son?" features synths, drums and bagpipes and "whooshing space-tech sounds". It has been described as "ripping in on a wave of synthesised energy" and as soaring "into a tsunami of sound". With this track, one reviewer says the album "explodes into life", whilst another noted that "as the album opens you may be forgiven for thinking you had stumbled into a trendy nightclub with its layers of electronic percussion and keyboard effects. However, the entrance of the melody instruments will reassure you that this is indeed music that is rooted in tradition." The second track "Jakes on a Plane" features a "faintly ominous" opening that morphs into a slowly languid dreamlike sequence. It is a quieter track featuring "some tasty combinations of flue and fiddle for the melody line with an underlying presence of synth, bass and percussion," and highly contrasts with the first track with its "delightfully lyrical" nature. "Tom in the Front" is a pipe-based composition that carries an exotic world music feel. "Angus & Joyce MacKay", dedicated by Morrison to his in-laws, was described as being "more concerned with soundscapes and imagery than melody and dance" and as being "greatly enhanced" by Ross Couper's "soaring" fiddle. The quiet mood of the song is continued by "The Real North", described as laid back funk music.

The second half begins with "Spider's", which had been an "ever popular" concert opener for approximately two years. A dance tune, described as "communal rave", it is "vigorous", "sprightly" and written in honour of one of Skye's liveliest ceilidh venues. It contains a keyboard-laden "frenzy" of whistle and fiddle, and a "seductive beat," and breaks the pattern of the other tracks as it is led by the fiddle. "The Dragon's Apprentice" is a thumping gait that one reviewer said feels "almost indecently inclusive and close-up, despite their preponderance of incidental instrumental detail." Showing the "spookier side of expression", it features "the various flavours that make up Peatbog Faeries; mix of pipes, electronics and flying fiddle solos, snake around a melody penned by nine year old Archie MacLean of Edinbane". "The Ranch" features "Doors/Santana-for-the-21st century electric guitar and keyboards flourish, the essential character of fiddle, pipes and whistle tunesmithing shines through." One reviewer said "Graeme Stafford's Hammond organ and Tom Salter’s forthright lead guitar are backed up by a solid drum and bass combination that would be at home on any Traffic album." The final two tracks are "The Chatham Lassies" and "Strictly Sambuca" which had combined live during Ross Couper's live duets with guitarist Tom Oakes for quite some time. For Blackhouse, "The Chatham Lassies" is reworked into an eight-minute composition that opens with the familiar and lively fiddle/acoustic guitar duet and skips along towards a more sedate pace, but with a full, rich sound." Closing track "Strictly Sambuca," on the other hand, written after "tunes and wild craic" at the Lock Inn, Fort Augustus, is a nine-minute "party tune" featuring pulsing beats, strong trance credentials and a whirlwind of fiddle and pipe solos. One reviewer called it perhaps the most exotic-sounding track on the disc, featuring a hypnotic quality with the melody instruments lower in the mix than in the other tracks. Another review observed its "electro griddle" which takes time to blip and bounce along a funk guitar line hyping the groove and low whistle echoing spookily.

== Release and reception ==
Professional ratings
Review scores
| Source | Rating |
|---|---|
| Bright Young Folk | (favourable) |
| Fatea Records | (favourable) |
| Folk Radio | (favourable) |
| Folk Words | (favourable) |
| The Sunday Herald | (favourable) |
| The Living Tradition | (favourable) |
| Spiral Earth | (favourable) |
| UK Folk Music | (favourable) |
| TheYamYam | (favourable) |

The album was officially released on 25 May 2015 by the band's own label Peatbog Records. However, copies were sent a week prior to those pre-ordering the album from the band's website. It was released to very positive reception from critics. Tim Carroll of FolkWorlds said the album is "at times inspiring, sometimes mysterious and at others disconcerting", adding "this is visceral music that digs itself deep under your skin." Alan Morley of UK Folk Music said the album was "an amazing and delightful piece of work from a top band of adventurous musicians and record producers. Listen this with an open mind and let the sound flow over you and around you. A sonically stunning album and essential listening." Neil McFadyen of Folk Radio said that "with Calum MacLean at the production desk again, we’re assured of that familiar, joyful affirmation that trad and trance is a marriage made in heaven; but that doesn’t mean it’s more of the same for Peatbog Faeries. Almost twenty years since their first release, Mellowosity, with Blackhouse they’ve proven, yet again, that their music, while staying in the same musical vein that keeps live audiences on their feet (and probably brings them to their knees by the end of the night), they can still move the music forward, provide a fresh approach, and keep that audience coming back time and again." Simon Jones of Spiral Earth said that "Blackhouse is swagger and sweat, a monumental homage to home, a sumptuous cavalier shot of bravado and experiment, which has undoubtedly assured the Peatbog Faeries individualism and taken them to the borders of lands unknown. Dazzling."

Fatea Magazine have shortlisted the album for "Instrumental Album for the Year" at the Fatea Awards 2015, whilst Folk Worlds have nominated the album for "Best Album from a Band" at their 2015 Album Awards. The album was almost nominated for "Album of the Year" at the MG Alba Scots Trad Music Awards 2015. The album featured in the July 2015 edition of the fRoots Playlist, a monthly playlist of the "new favourite albums" of "the fRoots player". Meanwhile, "Tom in the Front" featured as the fourteenth track on the July 2015 Edition of the fRoots Radio playlist. fRoots reported that the album charted at number 21 in the "Amazon.co.uk Folk/Roots/World 30" in November 2015, described by the magazine as the "non-budget price CD sales from Amazon.co.uk" for folk, roots and world albums from that month. Morrison and Couper discussed the album on the BBC Radio Scotland show Travelling Folk on 31 May 2015; the same edition of the show played three songs from the album. The following day, "Is This Your Son?" featured on the Foot Stompin' Podcast No. 141.

== Track listing ==
1. "Is This Your Son?" - 5:28
2. "Jakes on a Plane" - 5:30
3. "Tom in the Front" - 4:12
4. "Angus and Joyce MacKay" - 5:29
5. "The Real North" - 5:57
6. "Spider's" - 5:17
7. "The Dragon's Apprentice" - 4:33
8. "The Ranch" - 5:30
9. "The Chatham Lasses" - 8:19
10. "Strictly Sambuca" - 8:49

== Personnel ==
- Stu Haikney on drums and percussion
- Innes Hutton on bass
- Peter Morrison on pipes and whistles
- Ross Couper's fiddle and effects
- Tom Slater on guitar and ebow
- Graeme Stafford on keyboards
