= Welcome to Dun Vegas =

Studio album by Peatbog Faeries
- Released: 28 July 2003
- Studios: Pool Roag, Dunvegan, Scotland
- Genres: Celtic fusion; experimental; world fusion
- Length: 53:29
- Label: Peatbog Records
- Producers: Calum MacLean; Iain Copeland

Peatbog Faeries chronology
Faerie Stories (2001)	Welcome to Dun Vegas (2003)	Croftwork (2005)

Welcome to Dun Vegas is the third album by Scottish Celtic fusion group Peatbog Faeries, released in July 2003 as the first release on the band's own Peatbog Records label. The album was recorded in a cottage on the banks of Pool Roag, near Dunvegan, on the Isle of Skye. Following the electronic-infused Faerie Stories (2001), Dun Vegas was co-produced between Calum MacLean and the band's drummer Iain Copeland. The album is experimental, mixing traditional and modern Celtic music with other genres and styles such as African music and electronica and featuring experimental effects including backwards drumming and a track based around a kitchen cooker timer.

The album is also the band's first to feature vocals, in both English and Gaelic, although they are placed sparsely and used in an unconventional, inimitable fashion. Several tracks on the album, including instrumentals, are based on fictional stories. The album was released to positive reviews from critics, with critics complimenting the unique sound and styles, and the accompanying live tour also featured positive reviews. It also sold well, helping to expand the band's fan base, and has been described as the band's "calling card." Roots Review said it "still remains an essentially Celtic album."

== Background and recording ==
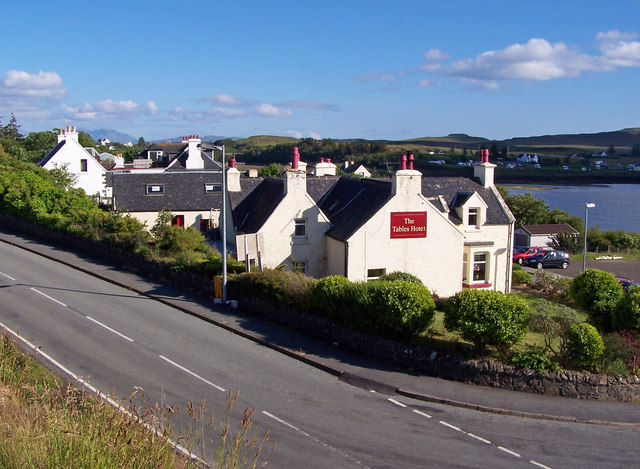
The album was recorded near and named after Dunvegan (pictured).

With their second album, Faerie Stories (2001), Peatbog Faeries transitioned from their original art rock-tinged Celtic fusion sound and recorded an album without rock instrumentation and instead a strong focus on electronica, house and dub influences mixed in with their Celtic instrumentalism. Although the album was recorded in 1999, it was not released in 2001 largely due to record label difficulties which led it to be released by both Greentrax Recordings, who released their first album Mellowosity (1996), and New York-based Astor Recordings. Ben Ivitsky, who performed fiddle, triangle and throat singing on Faerie Stories, left the band following its release, as did guitarist and mandolin player Ali Pentland and keyboardist Nuruduin. Consequently, the band were joined by fiddle player Roddy Neilson, guitarist Thomas Salter and keyboardist Leighton Jones.

The band's problems with record companies led to the band creating their own record label, Peatbog Records, for the release of their third album Welcome to Dun Vegas, and set for recording the album in a cottage on the banks of Pool Roag near Dunvegan, Isle of Skye, Scotland. The band installed a studio in the cottage and recorded the album over three months. Like the band's previous albums, the record was jointly co-produced between the band's percussionist Iain Copeland and their longtime co-producer Calum MacLean. The band described that after installing the cottage they "had a party" for three months, "occasionally recording as [they] went." The band openly admitted that their stay at the studio was protracted and "whisky-enhanced."

Band leader, piper and whistler Peter Morrison wrote seven of the eleven tracks on Welcome to Dun Vegas which, according to The Living Tradition, "somehow summons up peat bogs and mountains – and of course a fine malt!." Two of the remaining songs were written by other band members, and the other two were traditional pieces. The Veganites, a local harmony group, were in the cottage during the recording of the album and agreed to collaborate. While still incorporating electronic instrumentation, the band marked more of a return to live instruments than the predominantly electronic Faerie Stories during the production of Dun Vegas, while continuing to experiment, incorporating vocal effects, "found sounds" and reversal techniques.

== Music ==
"Welcome to Dun Vegas is a mosaic of pipe and fiddle tunes, earthy dance rhythms, keyboard effects, dodgy vocals and various unidentified noises. Sometimes the foreground is filled with tunes from the Irish and Scottish traditions, sometimes with modern melodies, and occasionally with Gaelic singing. The rest of the time, anything goes. Stepping back from "Wacko King Hako", "Phat Controller" and "Ironing Maiden", the big picture is of a good-time band with enormous creativity."

— Alex Mongahan of Folk World

Welcome to Dun Vegas fuses the band's "own brand of Hebridean music" with various other styles and genres such as African music, "deep dub bass lines," "all round spacey electronica" and "earthy dance rhythms" with "keyboard effects," experimental music, "inimitable" vocals and "various unidentified noises." Dawn Laker of Roots Review noted the album's mixture between traditional and modern instruments, and "rhythmic inspiration from as far afield as Africa and South America." The foreground of the music throughout the album can change from traditional Celtic tunes originating from Ireland and Scotland, often in a fragmented fashion, to "modern melodies" and instances where "anything goes." Neilson and Morrison provide the traditional-esque melodies, which unfold over Copeland's "hi-tech grooves," Salter's "richly layered guitar" and Jones and Innes Hutton's keyboard and bass work.

The album is the band's first to feature vocals, sometimes in Gaelic, although only a small amount is featured, and are used unconventionally and inimitably, and placed sparsely. For example, the spoken word vocals on "Teuchstar" and "bendy version" of traditional Gaelic song "Fear Eile." The final two songs on the album, "Skeabost Monsoon" and "A Taste of Rum," feature guest vocals from the local vocal group The Veganites, who were in the cottage during the album's recording. Peatbog Faeries later wrote a thank you message to the Veganites in the liner notes of their following album Croftwork (2005) which also features an instrumental entitled "Veganites". Some of the tracks on the album are based on fictional stories.

=== Structure ===
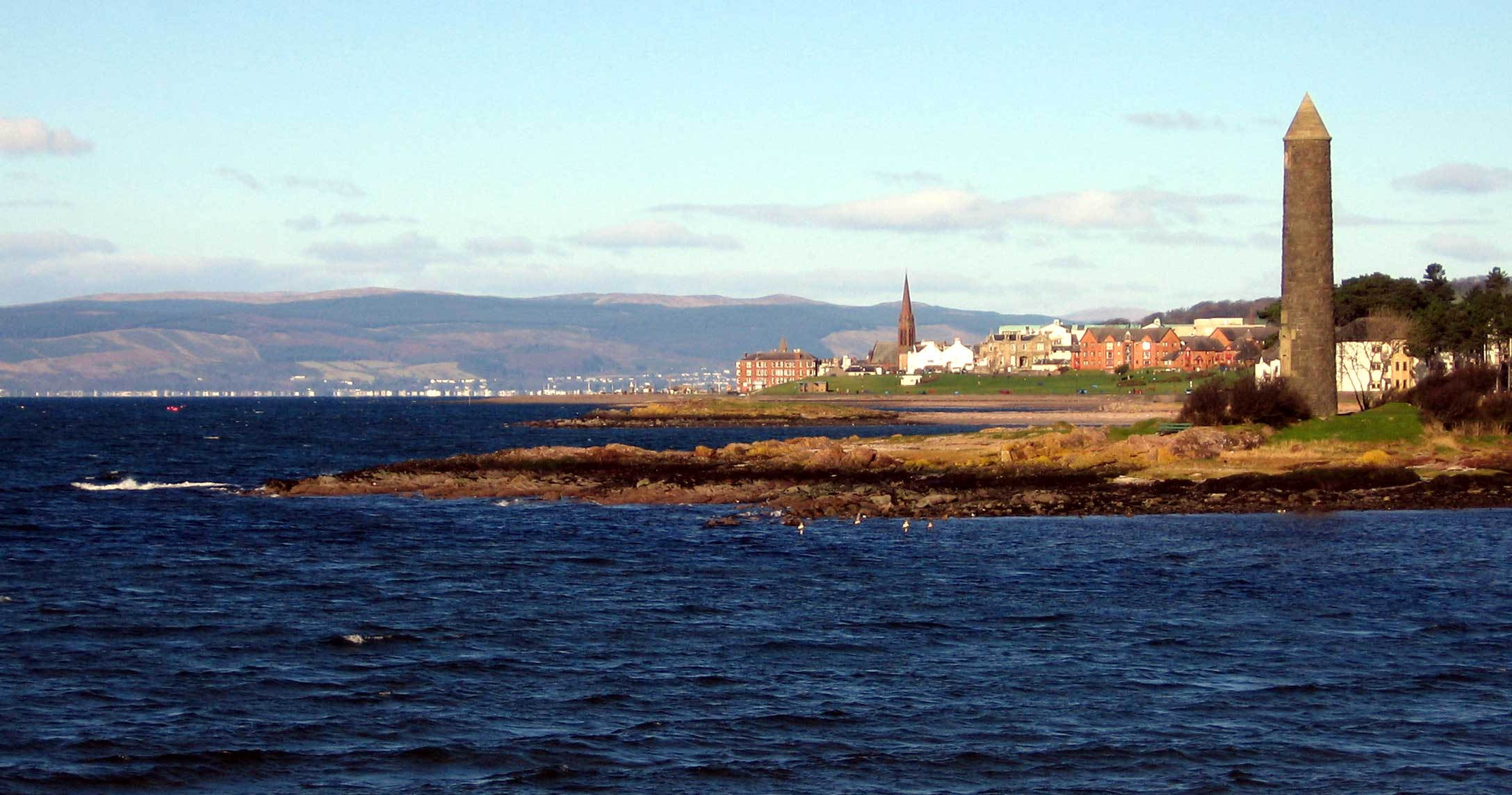
"Wacko King Hako" is about a Viking ruler who last a battle to the Scots at Largs (pictured.)

The pipe-led "Wacko King Hako" opens the album with a mystical vibe and features sounds reminiscent of whale calls It is based on the fictional story about the Viking ruler who in 1263 lost a battle to the Scots at Largs. When returning to Shetland, he and his fleet of long ships stopped in Pool Roag in front of where the band's studio now stands and "probably had one last raid on the community." "Fear Eile", one of two traditional-based pieces on the album, is the first track on the album to feature vocals, albeit in Gaelic, performed by Neilson and Hutton. Featuring a somewhat postmodern arrangement mixing traditional and contemporary styles, the uptempo song has been described as an island rowing song; the liner notes state the song tells "of the island man's passion for rowing off to neighbouring islands to collect fresh women", joking that "the building of the Skye Bridge much to do with the demise of this tradition."

The different melodies to both parts of the driving "The Phat Controller/The Red Bee" interweave, rather than the first part leading directly into the next. Written during the night, the track is another mix between traditional and modern styles, and features sparse vocals, contemporary sounding bass and eminent whistle playing. Guitarist Tom Salter wrote the "Phat Controller" part after thinking he had completed his work on the album. The upbeat "Ironing Maiden" features a disparate array of sounds. The title track "Welcome to Dun Vegas" was recorded in a "whisky haze" at 4am following a session in the Dunvegan hotel. After producer Calum McLean noticed a cooker clock producing an interesting rhythm, he recorded and tampered with it and asked the band to come up with a tune around the sound, thus creating the track. Pipes and bass seep gently into the piece, while Neilson's fiddle playing adds a psychedelic element. The experimental "Shifting Peat & Feet" features lyrical pipe playing and backwards drumming from the band's percussionist Iain Copeland. The African-inspired rhythm was based on another that Copeland learnt while in a Namibian workshop.

"Gibbering Smit" refers to the band's lighting engineer Niall 'Smit' Smythe, Irish "gibbering champion," who "kissed the Blarney Stone three times." "Morning Dew", the second and final traditional track on the album, features an unsettling, modern treatment, with its "deceptive slowness" and usage of minor keys. The contrasting instrumentation of whistles and keyboards dominate the track. It features an Irish reel atop a slow tango beat, with "general weird background effects." "Teuchstar" features poetry from Aiden McEoin and Morrison's percussive pipe playing, while Nielson's fiddle matches the pipe playing note for note. The fiddle-led "Skeabost Monsoon" is the first of two consecutive songs to feature The Veganites on vocals, and minimises the usage of bass while using the fiddle for "angst-ridden modernity." The album finishes in relaxing fashion with "A Tate of Rum", the most African-influenced track on the album.

== Release and reception ==
Welcome to Dun Vegas was released on 28 July 2003 by Peatbog Faeries' own label Peatbog Records as the label's first release. The album title is a play on the words Dunvegan with Las Vegas. The liner notes contain the Aiden McEoin quote "I can't be at one, for what's done is done" which also feature in the lyrics of "Teuchstar". The opening page of the booklet gives the album an alternative name, More Faerie Stories. The band noted that the album sold well. The band toured in the United Kingdom, Ireland and internationally in support of the album, appearing on the regular folk festival routine, as well as playing a low-key performance at Glastonbury Festival which prompted one NME journalist to write: "I wanted to check out R.E.M. but sorry guys, it's your misfortune to be on at the same time as The Peatbog Faeries, the highlight of Glastonbury. Mere earth words can't do the Faeries justice...".

The album has been described as the band's "calling card left politely." Several of the songs from the album have featured on various artist compilation albums; "Wacko King Hako" appears on Larry Kirwan's Celtic Invasion (2013), a compilation compiled by Irish musician Larry Kirwan featuring "a dozen of his favorite bands and most requested rock tracks from his SiriusXM show Celtic Crush," whilst "Teuchstar" appears on Beginner's Guide to Scotland (2006), a compilation of introductory songs to Scottish music released by record label Nascente. On the band's live album, Live (2009), which was compiled from two of the band's 2008 concerts, "Wacko King Hako" appears as the fifth track. The African influence that the band took on Dun Vegas, mostly notably in the track "A Taste of Rum," would later be explored furthermore with "Room 215" from Dust (2011).

=== Critical reception ===
Professional ratings
Review scores
Source	Rating
FolkWorld	(favourable)
Glasgow Herald	5/5 stars
Inverness Courier	(favourable)
The Living Tradition	(favourable)
Roots Review	(favourable)
The Scotsman	(favourable)

The album has been well received by music critics. Making note of the heavy African influence, Jane Brace of The Living Tradition was favourable to the album, calling the album "stimulating" and saying "party animals and sufferers of restless leg syndrome will be in seventh heaven." Dawn Laker of Roots Review "highly recommended" the "fabulous" album, saying it "still remains an essentially Celtic album," and noting it "reeks openly of that fun and even smacks of a little whiskey." The Scotsman said the album marked "an increasingly adventurous melting pot of fragmented fiddle and pipe tunes... Deep dub bass lines and all round spacey electronica comprehensively rocked the house." Kenny Mathieson of the same newspaper praised the album.

Calling the album "marvellous stuff," Alex Mongahan of Folk World said that "if you have a taste for the unusual, especially when it has bagpipes in it, you'll probably be hooked," and said that "technically, the production on this album is spot on and the musicianship is excellent." Saying the album "sees the future," writer Simon Thoumire complimented the album's "strong grooves, excellent melodies and futuristic sounds" as well as Copeland's drumming and co-production, saying: "This new CD picks up the mantle of the last CD and runs with it taking the band to a whole new level." The Inverness Courier said "the Skye based techno-folkies don't just let themselves be influenced by fashion, they embrace it," while in a five out of five star review for the Glasgow Herald, Sue Wilson said "the many existing Peatbog fans, along with other lovers of cutting-edge folk fusion will love it." One description described the album as "hard hitting Scottish fusion like you have never heard before."

== Track listing ==
1. Wacko King Hako (5:52)
2. Fear Eile (4:32)
3. Phat Controller / The Red Bee (4:53)
4. Ironing Maiden (4:22)
5. Welcome To Dun Vegas (5:34)
6. Shifting Peat and Feet (3:55)
7. Gibbering Smit (4:34)
8. Morning Dew (5:47)
9. Teuchstar (5:11)
10. Skeabost Monsoon (4:13)
11. A Taste Of Rum (4:31)

== Personnel ==
- Peter Morrison – pipes, whistles
- Innes Hutton – bass
- Thomas Salter – electric and acoustic guitars
- Leighton Jones – keyboards
- Roddy Neilson – fiddle
- Iain Copeland – percussion, co-producer
- Calum MacLean – co-producer

== See also ==
- Celtic fusion
