= What Men Deserve to Lose =

What Men Deserve To Lose

Studio album by Peatbog Faeries
- Released: 16 July 2007
- Recorded: Roag, Isle of Skye, 2007
- Genres: Celtic fusion; experimental; dance
- Length: 49:14
- Label: Peatbog Records
- Producers: Calum MacLean; Iain Copeland

Peatbog Faeries chronology
Croftwork (2005)	What Men Deserve To Lose (2007)	Live (2009)

What Men Deserve To Lose is the fifth album by Scottish Celtic fusion group Peatbog Faeries, recorded at Skye Recording in Roag on the band's native Isle of Skye in 2007, and was commercially released on 16 July 2007 on the band's own label Peatbog Records, though the album had been sold at festivals, and from the band's website, since 22 June 2007. It is the band's first album to feature Graeme Stafford, who brings what the band described as a "dancey" feel to the album.

Following the band's previous album Croftwork (2005) and its subsequent supporting tour, the band were quick to work on What Men Deserve to Lose, and the gap between the albums is to date the shortest between any of the band's albums. In addition to new member Stafford, the brass section The Wayward Boys return from the previous album. The band had numerous sources of inspiration on the album, including taking inspiration from their surroundings in Skye, and people and places they had encountered in the years prior to making the album. The album was released to a positive reception from music critics, and two concerts from the subsequent supporting tour also formed the basis of the band's sole live album, Live (2009).

== Background and recording ==
Following the launch of their record label Peatbog Records in 2003, Peatbog Faeries recorded and released their third and fourth albums,Welcome to Dun Vegas (2003) and Croftwork (2005). Both albums explored a variety of genres fused with the bands Celtic fusion sound, including funk, jazz, electronica and world. Both albums were critical successes and with a firm fan base, the band set to record their fifth album for release in 2007 with the addition of Graeme Stafford, the band's new keyboard player. The album was recorded at Skye Recording in Roag on the band's native Isle of Skye in 2007. The band's traditional production duo of Calum MacLean and the band's percussionist Iain Copeland returned to produce the album, whilst Skye Recording's Dennis Blackham mastered the album.

== Music ==
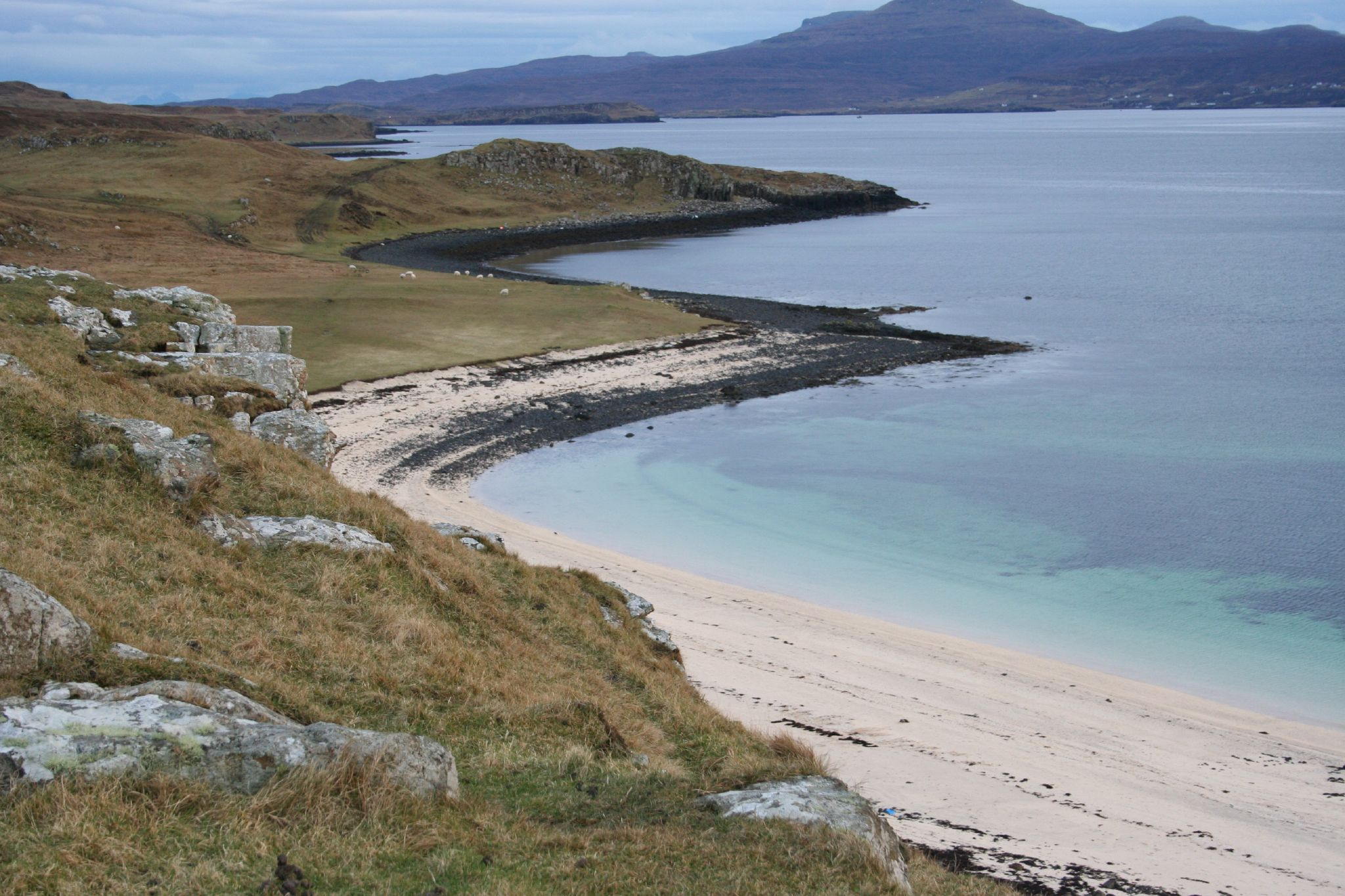
The band took inspiration from their Skye surroundings.

For What Men Deserve to Lose, the band took inspiration "from their surroundings in Skye, people they had met and places they visited over the couple of years" prior to making the album. The band said they were trying to bring a "fresh edge to the established Peatbog sound". Stafford brings what the band described as a "contemporary dancey feel" to the album, whilst the "great addition" of the band's brass section, The Wayward Boys, return from Croftwork and were announced as being a "now established" part of the band's sound. The whistles that Morrison plays on the album are Overton whistles by Colin Goldie, Sinclair/Strathmore highland pipes, Garvie border pipes by Nigel Richard and small pipes by Hamish Moore, while Innes plays Fylde guitars, G&L and Musicman basses.

The album was characterised as showing the band move "out further into the big, blue beyond, still latching on to island roots yet in a mood of glorious experiment." It is comparable to dance music due to its driving rhythms, whilst the band's brass section, the Wayward Boys, are given more prominence than on Croftwork. The variety in the album's usage of keyboards was noted by critics, as was its jazz-influenced percussion; one reviewer observed "some brilliantly worked introductions" and multiple instances of "lead instruments changing within tracks." The reviewer noted that "there’s even a hint of vocals if you listen carefully."

The opening track, "The Locks & Rocks Reel", gets its name from a near disastrous boat trip in Sweden from band member Peter Morrison, who wrote the track. "Jason's Famous Banjo" is named after the band's producer Calum MacLean whose stage name is Jason Famous, and when band member Innes travelled to the Staten Island, New York City to buy him a banjo. The title of the track "There's a Girl Behind the Bar Who Think She's Garbo", which mentions iconic Swedish film actress Garbo, is believed to be a reference to Kirsty MacColl's first hit "There's a Guy Works Down the Chip Shop Swears He's Elvis" from 1981. The track is dedicated to, as the liner notes describe, "all those barmaids in New York City who tell you they're an actress while chatting you up for tips". The track features samples of New York City traffic in its intro and outro. "Friend of Crazy Joe" is dedicated to Glasgow promoter Billy Kelly who died during the recording of the album. He worked with the band during their 2005 trio to Sydney where they became good friends. The title itself refers to the band's driver, a man of Italian descent made up a fictitious Scottish friend named Crazy Joe. "Ramsaig" is named after a picturesque site of a cleared village near Dunvegan where Morrison's grandparents lived as shepherds, whilst the title of album closer "Nyup" is described in the liner notes as "a fun word to pepper your conversation with. Repeat as necessary." Guest musician John Disco plays additional guitar on the track.

== Release and reception ==
Professional ratings
Review scores
Source	Rating
Allmusic	3.5/5 stars
fRoots	(favourable)
The Living Tradition	(favourable)

The album was announced in 2007 by the band's website. Their third album on their own label Peatbog Records, it was first released on 22 June 2007 on the band's website and from festivals the band were playing at. It was then released commercially on 16 July 2007. The album features a new logo for the band, marking the end of the band using their previous logo of seven years. The CD release was also released with a transparent CD tray, a first for the band, and the booklet and cover photographs were photographed by their percussionist Iain Copeland. The album title is a quote from writer Derek Cooper, taken from his 1983 book Skye. An excerpt from the book about faeries, which concludes with the quote, feature in the album's liner notes.

The album has been well received by critics. Simon Jones of fRoots gave a positive review of the album, saying "there can be no one direct approach taken to describe the constantly evolving music of the Peatbog Faeries, its very nature is polyglot and that disparate collection of philosophies makes them the perfect band for 2007. In a time when we have to move beyond silly categories and vague labels, which by very definition can no longer apply – unless you’re stuck in a time warp – fusion is the only term that makes real sense. If anything, What Men Deserve to Lose (a quote from writer Derek Cooper) moves out further into the big, blue beyond, still latching on to island roots yet in a mood of glorious experiment". Chris Nickson of Allmusic was also positive, saying, after noting the many instruments used on the album, "the result is that they combine ancient and modern in very effective proportions, and aren't afraid of heavy touches of electricity, like Tom Salter's raucous guitar work on "The Invergarry Blues." They've gradually conjured up their own space". Dave Beeby of The Living Tradition was favourable, saying "this is dance music at its best, driving rhythms and all that, whilst being a really good listen. They haven’t sat back on the success of their previous CD, but have strengthened even more."

Following the release of the album, the band embarked on a long running tour from 2007 to 2008. The tour typically featured eleven tracks, including an eighteen and a half minute set known as "The Dancing Feet Set" which combined different tracks from various different periods of the band's career. Recordings of tracks from two of the 2008 concerts from the tour were then used to create the band's highly anticipated live album Live (2009), which features four tracks from What Men Deserve to Lose amongst its eleven tracks; "The Invergarry Blues", "The Locks and Rocks Reel", "Friend of Crazy Joe" and "Still Drunk in the Morning".

== Track listing ==
1. "The Locks and Rocks Reel" - 5:07
2. "The Invergarry Blues" - 3:46
3. "Jason's Famous Banjo" - 3:58
4. "There's a Girl Behind the Bar Who Thinks She's Garbo" - 5:55
5. "Sudden Dilemma" - 5:57
6. "Friend of Crazy Joe" - 5:39
7. "Dr. Gig" - 4:23
8. "Still Drunk in the Morning" - 5:20
9. "Ramasaig" - 4:46
10. "Nyup" - 4:17
