= Peatbog Faeries =

Scottish musical group

Background information
- Origin: Isle of Skye, Scotland
- Genres: Celtic fusion, experimental
- Years active: 1994–present
- Labels: Peatbog Records (2003−present); Greentrax Recordings (1994−2002)
- Members: Peter Morrison; Ross Couper; Innes Hutton; Tom Salter; Norman Wilmore; Stu Brown; Innes Watson
- Past members: Davie Tait; Didi Findley; Lorraine Marshall; Alan Edmunds; Ben Ivitsky; Ali Pentland; Norman Austin; Roddie Neilson; Leighton Jones; Adam Sutherland; Iain Copeland; Peter Tickell; Stu Haikney; Graeme Stafford
- Website: www.peatbogfaeries.com

The Peatbog Faeries are a largely instrumental Celtic fusion band. Formed in 1991, they are based in Dunvegan on the Isle of Skye, Scotland.

Their music embodies many styles and influences, including folk, electronica, African pop, rock and jazz, although their main influence is traditional Celtic music. The band's unique sound is created through a mix of programmed effects and traditional Celtic arrangements, played on bagpipes, fiddles, and whistles.

The band have twice won "Live Band of the Year" at the Scottish Traditional Music Awards and were nominated for "Live Band of the Year" at the BBC Radio 2 folk awards.

== History ==
The Peatbog Faeries formed in 1991. They recorded and released their debut album Mellowosity in 1996 on Greentrax Recordings. Two years later they signed to a New York label and recorded their second album, Faerie Stories. Due to problems at the record company the CD was not released for a further two years.

For their third album the band set up their own label, Peatbog Records. On the label, they released Welcome to Dun Vegas in 2003. The album introduced a small amount of vocals. In 2005, they released Croftwork, which saw the first appearance of brass instruments on an album. These have been a regular feature of the band's albums and live performances ever since.

The band toured in 2008, recording a series of gigs and subsequently released their first live album, Live, made up of two of these performances. The band's seventh studio album, Dust, was released in August 2011.

In 2010, they were inducted into the Hebridean Celtic Festival’s hall of fame.

The Peatbog Faeries released their latest album “Live @ 25” in 2017 to mark their 25th anniversary.

== Music ==
The band's genre is Celtic fusion. The band's 2001 Faerie Stories offered a completely different style of Celtic fusion. Trance music became the main theme of the album, as well as electronic dance music and reggae at times. Because of the electronic elements in the band's sound, their sound was once termed "acid croft".

The band's third album, Welcome to Dun Vegas, was a lot less Celtic at times, with bagpipes absent in a few of the songs, and the overall genre was alternative rock, returning to that of Mellowosity. The band used a new type of Celtic fusion for Croftwork, matching reggae, electronic dance music, alternative rock, and brass, with saxophones appearing in many of its songs. What Men Deserve to Lose is similar to Croftwork, with the brass roots returning, but with more alternative rock audible towards the end of the album.

A review of Blackhouse said the album draws "inspirations from everywhere. Jazz, funk, reggae and dance rub shoulders with special effects and synths, tradition combines with visions, contemporary rocks along with heritage."

== Notes ==
- Faerie Stories was originally made for a US record label which the release fell through before they self released the album.
- Welcome to Dun Vegas is also known as More Faerie Stories, as the opening page of the booklet titles the album as such. It references the band's previous album.
- Live and Dust were re-released in digipaks.
- Peatbog Records re-released Faerie Stories in a digipak in 2008, with subtle differences in track lengths and cover artwork.
- Their only songs to contain vocals are four songs on Welcome to Dunvegas (twice in distorted manner) and believed chanting in "Sudden Dilemma". Vocals also feature on Dust. More recently the acclaimed album Live@25 features the track "Humours of Ardnamurchan" with guest vocals from Katie Stafford (wife of band member Graeme).
- Peatbog Faeries appear on numerous compilation albums, including 1998's Heart of Scotland and 2005's Celtic Crossroads. 2010's Beginner's Guide to Celtic featured "The Folk Police", whilst the "Beginner's Guide to Scotland" featured "Teuchstar".

== Current line-up ==
- Peter Morrison – pipes; whistles
- Ross Couper – fiddles
- Tom Salter – guitars
- Norman Wilmore – keyboards
- Innes Hutton – bass; percussion
- Stu Brown – drums
- Innes Watson - acoustic guitar, fiddle, vocals

== Discography ==
=== Studio albums ===
- Mellowosity (1996)
- Faerie Stories (2000)
- Welcome to Dun Vegas (2003)
- Croftwork (2005)
- What Men Deserve to Lose (2007)
- Dust (2011)
- Blackhouse (2015)
- I See a World (2023)

=== Live albums ===
- Live (2009)
- Live @ 25 (2017)

=== Compilation albums ===
- Larry Kirwan's Celtic Invasion (2013)
