= Faerie Stories =

Studio album by Peatbog Faeries
- Released: 2000 (limited edition); 4 June 2001 (Greentrax version)
- Recorded: 1999
- Studios: Lealt Falls, Skye, Scotland; Apollo Recording, Glasgow, Scotland; Mortonhall Cottage, Edinburgh, Scotland
- Genres: Celtic electronica; Celtic fusion; electronica; dubtronica
- Length: 67:12
- Labels: Self-released; Greentrax Recordings; Astor Place Recordings; Peatbog Records
- Producer: Jason Famous

Peatbog Faeries chronology
Mellowosity (1996)	Faerie Stories (2000)	Welcome To Dun Vegas (2003)

Faerie Stories is the second album by Scottish Celtic fusion group Peatbog Faeries, released in 2001 on Greentrax Recordings. The album was reissued in 2008 as a digipack. The album is large departure from the sound of their début album Mellowosity (1996), and sees the band explore a largely electronic sound mixed with their traditional Celtic fusion sound. Influences of electronic genres such as electronica, house, dubtronica and trip hop, in addition to even dub music and African music can be heard on the album fused with traditional Scottish Celtic music.

Co-produced between the band's percussionist Iain Copeland and Calum MacLean, working under the pseudonym Jason Famous, the album was recorded in 1999 across three Scottish studios but was not released until June 2001 as the original record label intended to release the album, the New York-based Astor Place Recordings, went bankrupt and closed. Despite the delays, the album was released to a very positive critical response, and became one of Greentrax Recordings' best ever selling albums. It was re-released in 2008 on the band's own label Peatbog Records.

== Background ==
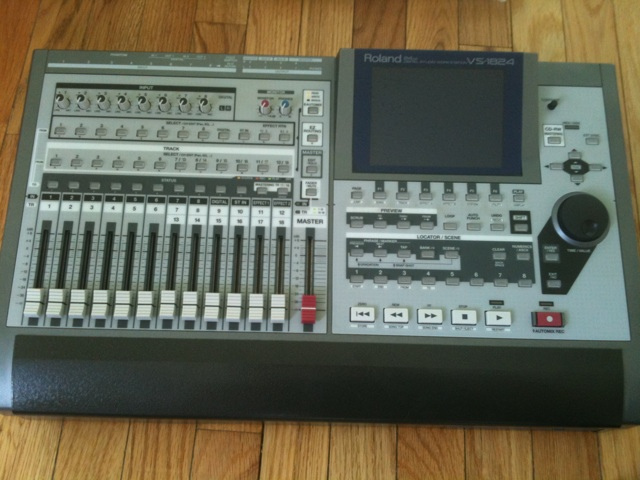
The band acquired a Roland multitrack recorder for the album.

Peatbog Faeries formed in 1994 on the Isle of Skye and signed to Greentrax Recordings for the release of their début album Mellowosity (1996). Originally working with both instrumental and vocal tracks, they had settled being on a purely instrumental band by the point of Mellowosity, with both fans and the band preferring this stance. Peter Morrison said that "obviously, as a band you normally gravitate to the stuff people are enjoying the most. You go by the crowd. We started mixing a bit of reggae and funk with pipe tunes. That was really popular. So we kind of started moving towards that. By the time we released our first album [Mellowosity], we almost moved completely away from songs." Mellowosity was released in December 1996, blended a wide spectrum of musical ideas into the band's repertoire. The general sound of the album included tinges of jazz, dub and a progressive sound compared to Pink Floyd.

The album was released to a positive reception from fans and critics, and Craig Harris of Allmusic, later noted that with Mellowosity, the band "emerged as one of the funkiest tradition-rooted bands in Scotland." Nonetheless, after the release of Mellowosity, the band sought to continue in a new direction. With new instruments such as a Roland VS800 and VS1680 being acquired by the band, the band's sound became more electronic than before, and after lengthy touring in support of Mellowosity, the band began work on the new album in 1999.

== Recording and music ==
The tunes on the album were conceived and arranged on the band's native Isle of Skye and were demoed in keyboardist Nurudin's house on Cabana's Roland VS880 and a small Mac. Ben used his Roland VS1680 to record the majority of his parts in his Edinburgh cottage. Recording of the album took place at three Scottish studios; Lealt Falls in the band's native Isle of Skye, Apollo Recording in Glasgow and Mortonhall Cottage in Edinburgh. "Get Your Frets Off" was recorded in all three studios before, according to the liner notes, the band "sacked everything except the toilet and rebuilt it" for the listener's pleasure. "Cameronian Rant" was remixed in Abbey Road Studios, which also led to the "Beatles reverb" on the track.

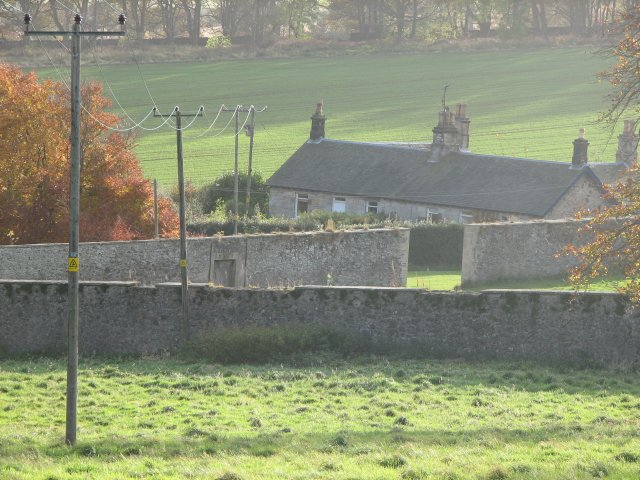
Part of the album was recorded at a cottage in Mortonhall, Edinburgh, like the one pictured.

The album is often seen as a more experimental album than Mellowosity (1996), their previous album. Faerie Stories is noted for its more electronic style, combining genres such as electronica, funk and dubtronica. One review noted that with this changes, "musically Faerie Stories is light years apart from their 1996 début album Mellowosity. Indeed, many of the album's tracks feature programming from both the album's production duo of Calum MacLean, working under the pseudonym "Famous", and the band's percussionist Iain Copeland, in addition to keyboard work from Nurudin.

Opening track "Martin Roachford's/The Oyster Woman's Rant" runs at over seven minutes. The opening sound of water is a recording of a small river in Glen Douglas. "The Folk Police" was written by the band's Peter Morrison during his youth, and was described as being given a "new name and a new lease of life" with its appearance on the album, whilst "Cptain Coull's Parrot" was written in honour of a parrot belonging to the band's manager's brother, a boat skipper, who taught the parrot "unrepeatable statements". The title track features briefly features a recording of birds in its intro that were recorded at Ronnie Rae Junior's house in Nice, France. The track was originally called "So You That That Was Mellow", in reference to the reaction from the band's record label Greentrax Recordings in reaction to the band's preceding album, Mellowosity. "Caberdrone" almost was not featured on the album until the band re-listened to it and thought "that's great". The closing track, "Alexander MacAskill of Berena, Harris" features a fusion of African music, dub music and pipes. The track which precedes it on the album, "Weirdness", is a minute long instrumental interlude which is described in the liner notes as simply "weird noises" created by the band.

== Release ==
Although the album was recorded in 1999, releasing the album became a problem when, as the band had signed to New York-based Astor Place Recordings, the label went bankrupt and closed. The band also credit "contractual hassles" and "remixes being called for" as also reasons for the delay. During the ongoing problems, the band had initially self-released the album as a "limited edition" in 2000, although after such problems were finished, the album was officially released with different artwork on 4 June 2001 on Greentrax Recordings, five years after their previous effort Mellowosity, also released on Greentrax. The Astor Place Recordings logo still features on the back cover nonetheless. Faerie Stories would be their last album on Greentrax, as the band would later set up their own record label, Peatbog Records, to release their albums, although Greentrax would continue to support the band, and included their early track "Lexy MacAskill" on an anniversary compilation album of songs from the label entitled Scotland, The Music and the Song: 20 Year Profile of Greentrax (2006). The meaning of the album title is described in the booklet as being "tunes which describe and commemorate notable faeie as an faerie events".

On 29 September 2008, the band's own label Peatbog Records re-released the album in a digipak. The copyright on the album is credited to Astor Place Recordings with the copyright year of 2000. Several other differences on this re-issue include the track lengths of certain tracks, and that the front cover features the Moon in the sky whereas the original Greentrax Recordings album cover did not. The re-release has replaced the Greentrax version in first hand retail and was probably created to do so.

== Critical reception ==
Professional ratings
Review scores
Source	Rating
The Living Tradition	(positive)

The album received very positive reviews from critics, and has been noted as the band's first album to bring the band some attention. Keith Whitham of The Living Tradition reviewed the album alongside the recent re-release of The Easy Club's 1984 album The Easy Club. He said that "with this CD they have stamped their place at the forefront of Celtic cool territory. Musically Faerie Stories is light years apart from their 1996 debut album Mellowosity. Gone is much of the dub style percussion and reflective tonality, in favour of more stirring urban styled rhythms. I don't have a problem with technology in traditional music as long as it's done with both character and respect, two attributes these six gentlemen from Skye have in abundance." Whitham also noted that with Faerie Stories, the band "have stamped their place at the forefront of Celtic cool territory" and "full of pulsating rhythms that are often purely the domain of Radio One on any chosen Friday night, this album gives the Celtic youth of today an opportunity to identify with their birthright. With no songs on the CD the band have ample chance to let the music speak for itself." Other reviews noted that the album still has a strong dub influence, such as on songs like "Mr Problematic", and that the most dance-orientated tracks are the first two tracks and "Caberdrone". Further comparisons were drawn with trip hop acts Massive Attack and UNKLE. Faerie Stories would be the band's only album in such an electronic style. The album remains one of Greentrax Recordings' best ever selling albums.

Several of the album's tracks remain staples in the band's live performances. Many of the songs had debuted several years before Faerie Stories was released due to the long time taken to release the album. "The Folk Police", whose title has more recently been shortened to "Folk Police" in subsequent appearances, has been played at almost every Peatbog Faeries performance since 1999. typically as the final track in the main set before the encore. One reviewer, upon watching the band perform it live in 2014, noted "the highlight of the gig is of course "Folk Police", with its heavy electronic influence and Morrison’s evocative performance on the bagpipes." A reviewer for The Guardian, seeing it close a live performance of the band later in the year, noted firstly that "this is a party band," and described "The Folk Police" as "yet another slick, high-energy dance workout". Festivals for All noted the track is a great favourite of theirs to which the band's bassist and sometime percussionist Innes Hutton noted that the track as being "one of those that’s developed and developed playing it live. [They have] been playing it a long time…. if there was a night [they] didn’t get an amazing reaction [they would] put it earlier in the set or not play it at all. That’s never happened… people love it so [they] keep it for the end of the show and once [they] added the brass to it a few years ago that’s added a different dimension too.” "Caberdrone" is also a track often played live by the band. The album's first track, "Martin Roachford's/The Oyster Woman's Rant", was also incorporated into the eighteen-minute set known as "The Dancing Feet Set" the band performed on their 2008 tour. "The Dancing Feet Set", alongside "Caberdrone" and "The Folk Police", appeared on their live album, Live (2009).

== Track listing ==
1. Martin Roachford's / The Oyster Woman's Rant (7:17)
2. The Folk Police (5:17)
3. Captain Coull's Parrot (6:07)
4. Namedropper / The Little Cascade (8:50)
5. Faerie Stories (6:31)
6. Cameronian Rant (6:05)
7. Get Your Frets Off (5:19)
8. Mr. Problematic (8:58)
9. Caberdrone (3:54)
10. Weirdness (1:00)
11. Alexander MacAskill of Bernera, Harris (7:48)

== See also ==
- Celtic fusion
