= Paul McKenna Band =

Scottish band

The Paul McKenna Band
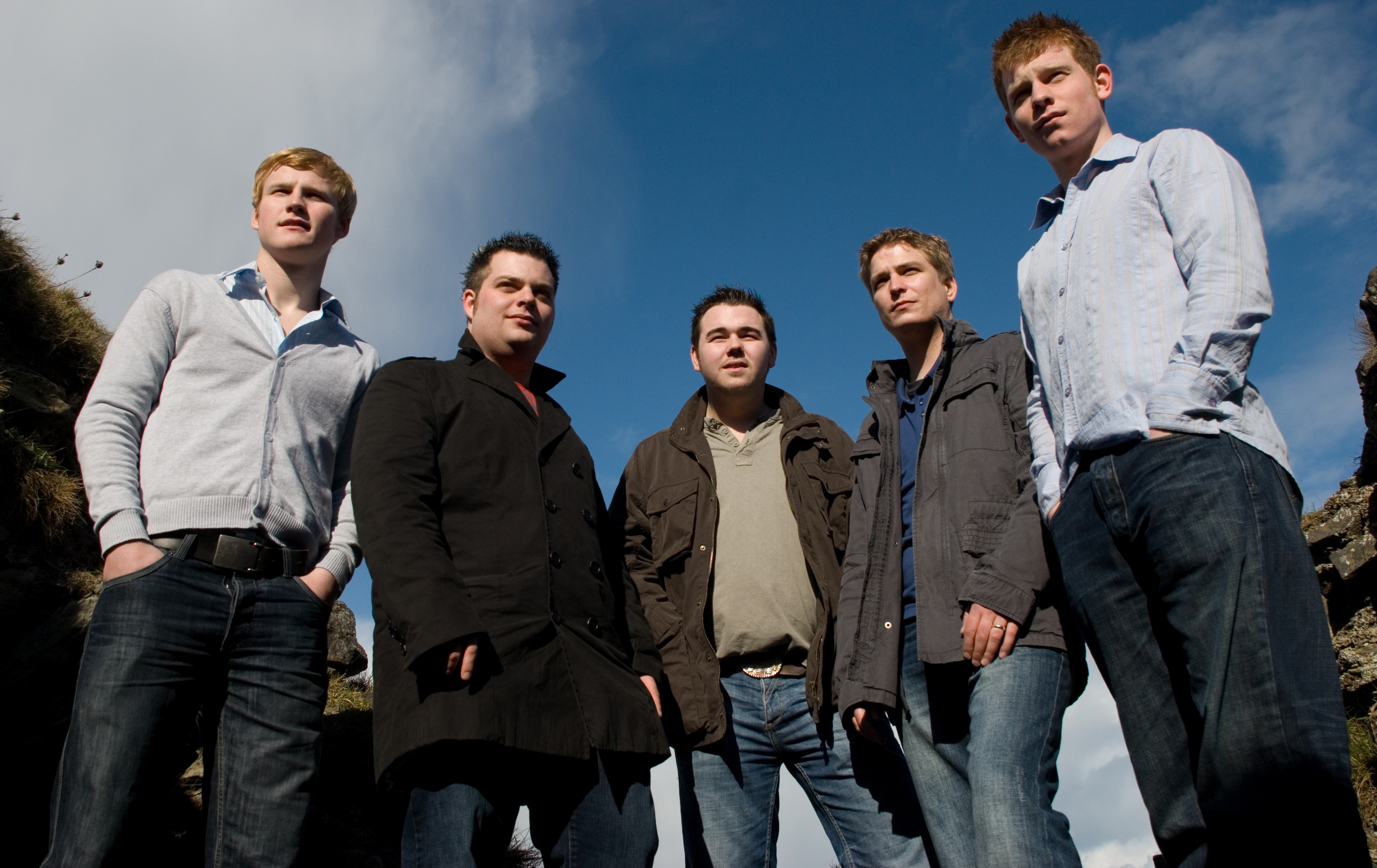
- The Paul McKenna Band (2008)

Background information
- Origin: Glasgow, Scotland
- Genres: Traditional, folk, Scottish
- Years active: 2006-present
- Label: Greentrax Compass PMB
- Members: Paul McKenna; Conal McDonagh; Robbie Greig; Ewan Baird; Conor Markey
- Past members: David McNee; Rua Macmillan; Mike Vass; Sean Gray
- Website: paulmckennaband.com

The Paul McKenna Band are a five-piece folk musical group from Glasgow, Scotland.

== Music career ==
The band was formed in 2006. Early members of the band were singer and songwriter Paul McKenna (guitar), Sean Gray (flute, whistles), David McNee (bouzouki), Ruairidh MacMillan (fiddle) and Ewan Baird (bodhran), later members included Conor Markey, Mike Vass, and Jack Smedley. They played traditional and folk music as well as original songs and tunes. In 2009, they released their debut album Between Two Worlds on the Greentrax record label. The album was produced by the band and Dick Gaughan, and engineered and mixed by Kris Koren and John Weatherby in Moffat, Scotland in late 2008.

After the release of their debut album, they toured with throughout the UK and Europe in 2009 and 2010, visiting Germany, the Netherlands, Austria, Italy, Czech Republic, Slovenia, and Spain. The band won the award for Best Up and Coming Artist at the Scots Trad Music Awards in November 2009 and subsequently performed a concert at the Arches in Glasgow which was broadcast on BBC Alba.

The band also completed a one-month tour in the USA to coincide with the release of Between Two Worlds on Mad River Records in late 2010.

In December 2010 the band recorded their second album Stem The Tide with producer Brian McNeill at Watercolour Studios in Ardgour. The album was released in March 2011.

In 2011 the band toured throughout North America, Canada, Denmark, Germany, Italy and the United Kingdom appearing at major folk festivals including Milwaukee Irish Fest, Tønder Festival and Cambridge Folk Festival.

They received a nomination for Folk Band of The Year in the Scots Trad Music Awards and performed at the award ceremony in Perth Concert Hall although the award was won by the Battlefield Band. They were nominated again in 2018.

Fiddler Mike Vass joined the band at the end of 2011 and performed his first concert with them at Glasgow's Celtic Connections Festival.

They recorded their third album, Elements, in a recording studio they built themselves, and used crowdfunding to help with the recording. It was released in 2013. A further album, Paths That Wind, was produced by John McCusker and released in 2016.

They also toured extensively throughout North America and made their first trip to Australia in 2016, performing at the Woodford Folk Festival among others. They have continued to perform in festivals around the world.

== Discography ==
- Between Two Worlds (2009)
- Stem the Tide (2011)
- Elements (2013)
- Paths That Wind (2016)
- Breathe (2019)

== Awards ==
MG Alba Scots Trad Music Awards 2009 - Best Up and Coming Artist
Fatea Magazine single/EP/Mini Album Of The Year 08

MG Alba Scots Tra D Music awards 2024 Folk Band of the Year
