= Ceilidh Minogue =

Ceilidh Minogue is a Scottish ceilidh band, which formed in 1995. The band played at the Ceilidh Culture Festival in 2008 and at the Fest'n'Furious festival in Dundee in 2006. They also performed at the Orkney Folk Festival in 2011. Ceilidh Minogue played at the 2009 Radio Scotland live Hogmanay show, and did so again in 2010, 2011, 2012, 2014, 2014, 2015 and 2016. The band played at the Commonwealth Games in Glasgow 2014 and the Rudolstadt Festival in Germany in 2017.

== Discography ==
- Ceilidh Minogue 2006 (Greentrax)
- There Y'Are Now 2008 (TMK)

== Line-up ==
- Gavin Marwick (see Traverse Theatre) (fiddle)
- Gregor Lowrey (accordion)
- Bob Turner (piano)
- Alastair Morrow (drums)

Jazz horns of Ryan Quigley, John Burgess and Steve Hawkes who were replaced by Colin Steele and Keith Edwards in 2010.
