= Mellowosity =

Studio album by Peatbog Faeries
- Released: 1 December 1996
- Recorded: 1996
- Genres: Celtic fusion; Celtic rock; art rock; world fusion; progressive; experimental
- Length: 46:53
- Label: Greentrax Recordings
- Producer: Peatbog Faeries

Peatbog Faeries chronology
Mellowosity (1996)	Faerie Stories (2001)

Mellowosity is the debut studio album by Scottish Celtic fusion group Peatbog Faeries, released in 1996 on Greentrax Recordings. After forming as a vocal-based Celtic rock group in 1994, the duo had settled into becoming an instrumental Celtic fusion group by the release of Mellowosity. The album draws from a wide range of musical styles and influences including jazz, reggae, afrobeat, rock, Eastern music, dub and funk, that are mixed in with the band's traditional Scottish folk/Celtic sound featuring fiddles and bagpipes.

The album was released in December 1996 to positive critical reviews. Dave Steger of Allmusic praised the eclectic sound of the album, and Marshall Anderson of The Living Tradition said "overall texture is thrilling and full of the unexpected." The album remains one of Greentrax Recording's best-selling ever albums. The band would tour the album throughout the rest of the 1990s before recording its follow-up record, Faerie Stories, in 1999.

== Background and recording ==
Peatbog Faeries formed on the Isle of Skye, Scotland, in 1994. In their early days, they sang on several tracks, and were a more traditional Celtic rock band, but noted fans wanted more of the instrumental tracks, a position the band shared. Peter Morrison said that "obviously, as a band you normally gravitate to the stuff people are enjoying the most. You go by the crowd. We started mixing a bit of reggae and funk with pipe tunes. That was really popular. So we kind of started moving towards that." By the point of recording their first album, they had moved away from songs completely. Prior to the recording of their first album, the band had been gigging around the Isle of Skye, undergoing many transformations. Consistent throughout this time has been "the dexterous thrapple" of piper, Peter Morrison, "the jazzy bass playing" of Innes Hutton, and the "virtuoso picking of various stringed instruments" by Ali Pentland. These founders were joined by fiddler Ben Ivitski, synthesiser and keyboard player Norman "Nurudin" Austin and Iain Copeland on percussion.

The band began recording their debut album, Mellowosity, in 1996 and finished it by the end of the year. The album was engineered by Beeg Al & Terry Adamas at Rel Studios, Edinburgh, and mixed by Iain Copeland and the Peatbog Faeries themselves. Iain Copeland dedicated his performance on the album to Steven Smillie, noting "gone but not forgotten" in the liner notes. Of the nine tunes on the album, four are composed by Peter Morrison and two are based on traditional arrangements. One review noted that it shows the band "supporting the assumption that their ideas are self-contained and firmly Skye-based."

== Music ==
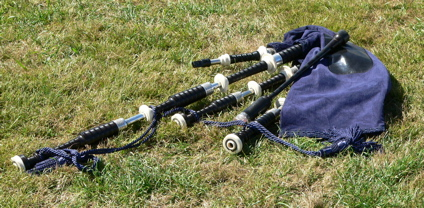
A key aspect in to several tracks is Morrison's bagpipes being fused with world genres.

Mellowosity features a highly eclectic sound featuring an array of different influences and styles, and was described as "creatively blending a wide spectrum of musical ideas into [the band's] repertoire." Dave Steger of Allmusic said that although the album might initially appear to be a typical "fiddle and pipes, Celtic-rock" record, "the album unfolds (and upon repeated listenings)" and "its subtleties are revealed to prove wrong that initial assessment" as "virtually every track is accentuated by a unique accent sometimes fleeting in duration and sometimes dictating the course of the track." Marshall Anderson of The Living Tradition said that the band "belong to the generation of Scottish musicians who have their roots planted firmly in our traditional folk music idiom while simultaneously and fearlessly exhibiting a willingness to experiment eclectically," and that, on Mellowosity, they "switch effortlessly from one influence to another often within the space of a bar. This stylistic shifting, which can take them from a bagpipe jig to an afro rhythm and from a reggae beat to rock guitar riffs reminiscent of Pink Floyd and back again to Scottish fiddle jigs, may upset, offend and raise the hackles of many purists but the overall texture is thrilling and full of the unexpected." Keith Whitham of the same publication said the album contained dub-style percussion and reflective tonality. The album saw the completion of the band's transition from a vocal-based group to an instrumental one.

The first track, "Lexy Macaskill", is a "mysterious" track which feature a motif that Seger compared to Mike Oldfield's Tubular Bells. "Eigg Man" is a more traditional, midtempo track with jazz and rock influences, whilst "The Manali Beetle" was described by Anderson as "ably demonstrating" the band's "technique of painting with sound". The track was described by Anderson as where an "electronic cicada introduces a solo chanter before Caribbean rhythms and an arrangement of bagpipes, synthesiser and echoic guitar chords are joined by a strong percussive dance beat which all fades out in an atmospheric swarm of insects." "Macedonian Women's Rant" is Eastern music-influenced, whilst "Angus McKinnon" features reggae rhythms that "unveil additional disparate tendencies" to the album. "Weary We've Been/Dancing Feet" is one of the album's most upbeat tracks and features the brief injection of a mbaqanga guitar line. "Maids of Mount Cisco" features "funky grooves and jazzy keyboards", whilst the last track, the title track "Mellowosity", "displays the band's full palette of colourful sounds which create a complex landscape that begins in deep space, travels to an ambient New Age encampment where synthesiser, keyboards and bluesy guitar riffs set the stage for haunting bagpipe refrains and raunchy bass lines before the whole fades out in a shimmer of electronic tweakings."

== Critical reception ==
Professional ratings
Review scores
Source	Rating
Allmusic	3/5 stars
The Living Tradition	(favourable)
The Sunday Times	(favourable)

The band signed to independent Celtic music label Greentrax Recordings who released Mellowosity in December 1996. The sleeve design, photo-montages and digital artwork were created by John Haxby. The packaging also features a painting by John Bathgate of Dun Studio at Borve and ironic thank you note to the Skye Bridge Company for its "financial atrocities". Despite being critically overlooked for some years after its release, Mellowosity garnered positive reviews. Dave Sleger of Allmusic rated the album three stars out of five and praised the eclectic array of styles on the album. Marshall Anderson of The Living Tradition was also favourable, saying that the album's "overall texture is thrilling and full of the unexpected", and noted that "this exciting melange of cosmopolitan sound sensations is clearly engineered for those who like to inject their music directly into their heads by wires - loud - and preferably while travelling through the scenic splendour of Scotland's west coast. Ideally from Skye, through Glen Cluanie, to Invermoriston." The Sunday Times were too favourable in their review.

Craig Harris, also of Allmusic, later noted that with Mellowosity, the band "emerged as one of the funkiest tradition-rooted bands in Scotland." The album remains one of Greentrax Recordings' best-selling ever albums, and in May 1997, five months after the release of the album, an article entitled Peatbogacious written by Kenny Mathieson appeared in issue 167 of Folk Roots. Nonetheless, Greentrax Recordings, although pleased with Mellowosity, thought the album was "mellow", and in a later commentary, David Kidman described it as "striking yet tentative". The band subsequently worked towards a more electronic sound for their follow-up album Faerie Stories, recorded in 1999 but not officially released until 2001. The album's title track was originally titled "So You Thought That Was Mellow" in reference to Greentrax's reaction to Mellowosity. The change of direction that Faerie Stories explored lead to one review noting that "musically Faerie Stories is light years apart from their 1996 début album Mellowosity. Greentrax Recordings later included "Lecy MacAskill" from Mellowosity on an anniversary compilation album of songs from the label entitled Scotland, The Music and the Song: 20 Year Profile of Greentrax (2006).

== Track listing ==
1. Lexy MacAskill (5:03)
2. Eiggman (3:42)
3. The Manali Beetle [F.F.F.f] (5:59)
4. Macedonian Woman's Rant (4:56)
5. Angus MacKinnon (4:40)
6. Leaving the Road (5:20)
7. Weary We've Been / Dancing Feet (3:57)
8. Maids of Mount Cisco (4:08)
9. Mellowosity (9:03)

== See also ==
- Celtic fusion
