= New College Lanarkshire =

College in North Lanarkshire, Scotland

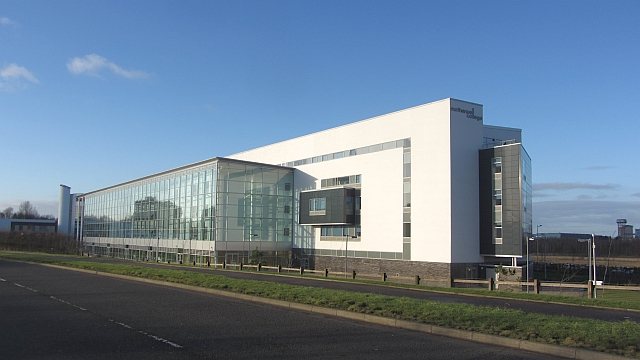
- Motto: Bringing Education Closer
- Type: College of Further Education
- Established: 2013
- Principal: Professor Christopher M Moore
- Location: Cumbernauld, North Lanarkshire, Scotland
- Website: http://www.nclanarkshire.ac.uk/

New College Lanarkshire is a further education institution in Scotland in North Lanarkshire. The college was created in November 2013 from the merger of Cumbernauld College and Motherwell College, and in 2014 it absorbed Coatbridge College. It has over 25,000 students.

== Cumbernauld campus ==
The main campus building was completed in 1978 as Cumbernauld Technical College, to designs by the Glasgow architectural practice Gillespie, Kidd & Coia. The original building is category B listed.

In August 2006, Cumbernauld College completed an extensive phased refurbishment and new build programme at the main campus. A window replacement scheme, renewal of lighting and heating systems, and internal space reconfiguration complement a new 2,250-square-metre (24,200 sq ft), three-story teaching block. Ground and first floor levels provide additional fully equipped teaching facilities and specialist rooms for health care, travel and tourism, and art. On the third floor the Business and Conference Centre offers the wider Business Community training and conference facilities. A new front entrance, reception and internal ‘street’ (495 square metres (5,330 sq ft)) connects all buildings and provides improved access to student services and support, learning centres, library facilities and social areas, as well as a dynamic space for exhibitions, promotion and student activity. The college also purchased a 970-square-metre (10,400 sq ft), modern, purpose-built canal side building in Kirkintilloch to develop activities and further education (FE) provision in East Dunbartonshire.

On Friday 1 November, Cumbernauld College and Motherwell college merged to rename as New College Lanarkshire

== Campuses ==
- Broadwood Campus
- Coatbridge Campus
- Cumbernauld Campus
- Kirkintilloch Campus
- Motherwell Campus

== Training Unit ==
The Training Unit delivers a range of government-funded programmes to enable individuals to enter into sustainable employment. These include:

- Training for Work
- Get Ready for Work
- Employability Courses
- Skillseekers / Modern Apprentices
- Support Employment

== Business and Conference Centre ==
Funded as part of the redevelopment programme, the Business and Conference Centre provides skills gap analysis, training needs analysis and bespoke training programmes for commercial clients. It includes meeting and conferencing facilities for 2 to 90.

== Students Association ==
New College Lanarkshire's Cumbernauld Campus Students Association now has a Sabbatical Student President and a full team of student officers.
