= Catya Maré =

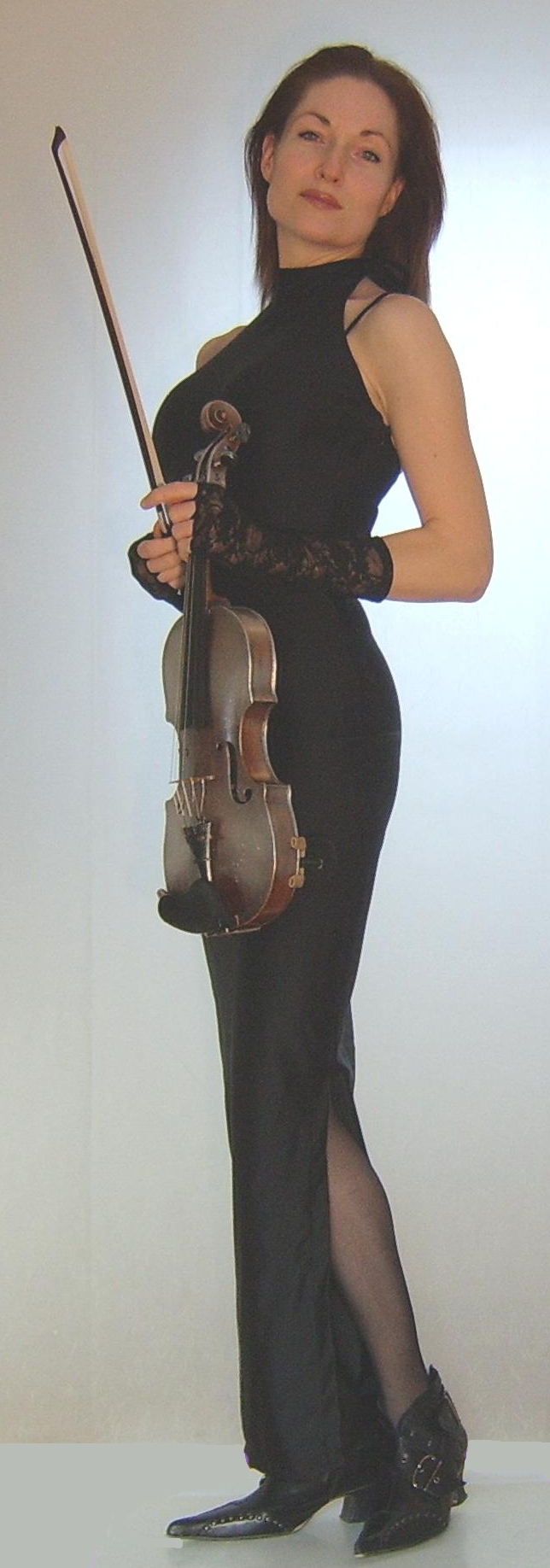
- Maré in 2007

Background information
- Origin: Germany
- Genres: Classical crossover, Celtic new age, electronic, world
- Occupations: Violinist, composer, music producer, writer and visual artist
- Years active: 1985–present
- Label: Catya Maré Music
- Website: www.catyamare.com

Catya Maré (pronunciation: catya maree) is a German composer, music producer, classical crossover violinist, visual artist and writer from Germany, now located in California. Maré has performed as a classical violinist since her early childhood, and has performed at the National Gallery Berlin, and Kunsthallen Brandts. In 2006, she started to compose and produce her own music.

In September, 2013, she released two poetry books, "A Silvery Moment" and "White Marbles". Complex, haiku style contemplations. In 2015 she relocated back to Germany.

== Life and career ==
Catya Maré was born in Neuss, Germany, into a family of professional classical musicians. She performed her first concert as a soloist with a symphony orchestra being only 10 years old. While a young adult she played solo concerts as a classical violinist in the United States, Israel, Scandinavia, Europe and at many festivals including Schleswig-Holstein Musikfestival and Santander Music Festival. She has received her master's degree at the Munich Music Conservatory and held the position of an alternating concertmaster with the Scandinavian symphony orchestra Aarhus Symfoniorkester.

In 2005, she became aware of her capability to improvise on her violin. During the following year, she did solo violin improv performances at the National Gallery, Berlin (Germany) and Kunsthaus Zürich (Switzerland). She left the orchestra in 2006 to create / perform her own music (Electronic / Pop / World / Celtic new age / Classical crossover).

In 2008, Maré relocated to the United States. She released five CDs, Light Longing, which was the result of a collaboration with the Danish music producers Jakob Gadegaard and Henrik Koitzsch, Remembering The Day, Destination Love, Tell Me Why... and Talk Talk Talk, which she composed, recorded and produced herself.

Her music is featured on motion picture Butterflies In The Wind, which premiered at the 2007 Ava Gardner Film Festival in North Carolina.

Catya Maré song clips
Catya Maré compilation

== Discography ==
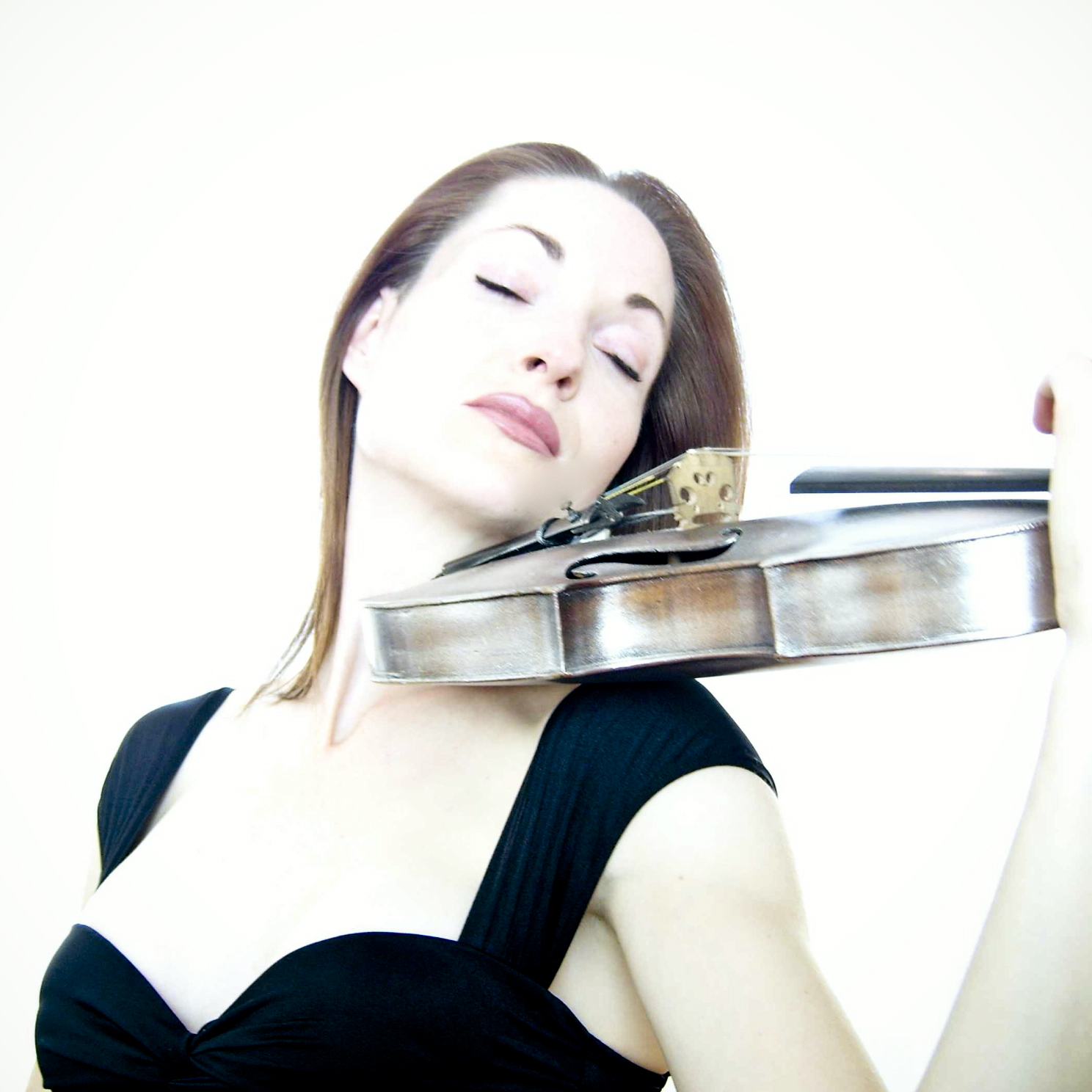
Maré in November 2007 in Los Angeles.

Light Longing

- Release date: 2007
- Label: Self-Released
- UPC: 0786851564662

Remembering The Day

- Release date: 2008
- Label: Self-Released
- UPC: 0786851564860

Destination Love

- Release date: February 8, 2010
- Label: Self-Released
- UPC: 0786851590661

Tell Me Why...

- Release date: September 8, 2010
- Label: Self-Released
- UPC: 0786851109375

Talk Talk Talk

- Release date: November 15, 2010
- Label: Self-Released
- UPC: 0786851316872

Voce

- Release date: August 28, 2014
- Label: Self-Released
- UPC: ushm81449478

== Book releases ==
A Silvery Moment

- Release date: September 5, 2013
- Label: Self-Released
- UPC: ASIN B00EZEXH1G

White Marbles

- Release date: September 21, 2013
- Label: Self-Released
- UPC: ASIN B00FC22QGW

== See also ==
- List of ambient music artists
