= Bodega (Scottish band) =

Scottish musical group

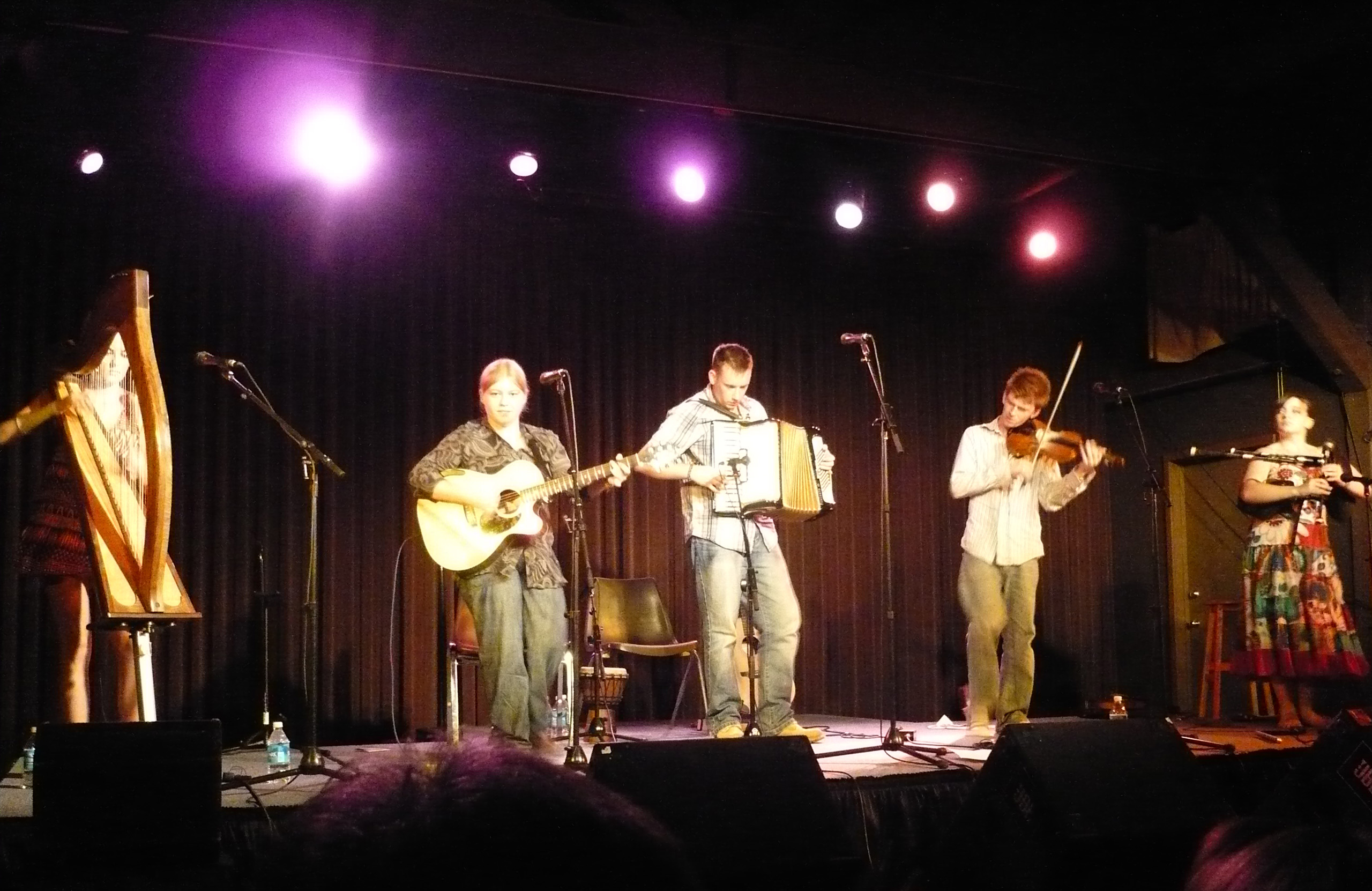
Bodega on stage in Ohio, 2008

Bodega was a Scottish band based in Glasgow, formed in March 2005. Its members met while they were studying together at the National Centre of Excellence in Traditional Music in Plockton, Scotland, from which they all graduated. The group was originally called Fiddle Dee Fiddle Dum. They disbanded at the end of 2011, citing the changing musical trajectories of the band's principal founding members.

== Membership ==
The group had five members:

- Gillian Chalmers (from Fraserburgh), border pipes, low whistle, and fiddle
- Ross Couper (from Shetland), fiddle
- Tia Files (from Oban), steel-string acoustic guitar, bass guitar, snare drum, djembe, and vocals
- Norrie MacIver (from Carloway, Isle of Lewis), lead vocals, accordion, steel-string acoustic guitar, and djembe
- June Naylor (from the Isle of Skye), gut-string clàrsach

A sixth member, Sandie Forbes (fiddle and vocals) played with the group until 2006. The group's members were all born between the years of approximately 1987 and 1989.

== Career ==
The band performed at the festival Celtic Connections for two years in a row, and also played at large festivals such as The Shetland Folk Festival and the HebCelt Fest.

The group performed traditional Scottish and Irish music, as well as newly composed material by its members, combining improvisation and eclectic influences from jazz, rock, funk, and other non-traditional genres. It also performed American repertoire, such as "Wagon Wheel" by Bob Dylan which has also been performed by Old Crow Medicine Show. The lead singer, Norrie MacIver, sings in both Scottish Gaelic (including waulking songs and puirt à beul) and English.

In late 2005 the group won the 2006 BBC Radio 2 Young Folk Award. They toured Europe and the United States several times.

== Discography ==
- 2006 - Bodega (Greentrax)
- 2008 - Under the Counter (Greentrax)
