= The Living Tradition =

Music magazine

- The Living Tradition, 100th issue (February/March 2014)
- Editor: Fiona Heywood
- Assistant Editor: Jed Mugford
- Categories: Music
- Frequency: Bi-monthly
- Format: A4
- Founder: Pete Heywood
- Founded: 1993; 32 years ago
- Company: The Living Tradition Ltd
- Country: United Kingdom
- Based in: Kilmarnock
- Language: English
- Website: livingtradition.co.uk
- ISSN: 1351-4105
- OCLC: 31509242

The Living Tradition was a bi-monthly music magazine published in the United Kingdom between 1993 and 2022. It specialised in traditional folk music from the UK, Ireland and beyond. The original editors were Peter and Heather Heywood. In 2015 the editor was Fiona Heywood, and the magazine had a Scottish office in Kilmarnock, Ayrshire and an Irish office in Ardara, County Donegal.

The magazine was regarded as "an independent and authoritative voice in the folk and traditional music scene" and the "definitive guide to the traditional and folk music scene". In addition to news, interviews, event listings and reviews, it also had articles about music theory and practice, and musicological and historical articles about traditional music.

In 2015, the magazine Fiddle On was merged into The Living Tradition. Fiddle On had been dedicated to fiddle-playing and had been published from Oxford for the previous fifteen years. Its editor Jed Mugford continued to write for The Living Tradition.

In Issue 144 (June/July 2022) the editor announced that after Issue 145 the magazine would no longer be published.
