= Roag, Skye =

Coordinates: 57.40428°N 6.54562°W

Roag: Scottish Gaelic: Ròdhag
- Location within the Isle of Skye
- OS grid reference: NG270440
- Council area: Highland
- Country: Scotland
- Sovereign state: United Kingdom
- Post town: Dunvegan
- Postcode district: IV55 8
- Police: Scotland
- Fire: Scottish
- Ambulance: Scottish

Roag (Scottish Gaelic: Ròdhag), meaning noisy place or 'deer bay' in Norse, is a small remote scattered hamlet on the north west shore of Pool Roag in the west of the Duirinish peninsula. Located on the Isle of Skye, Scottish Highlands, it is in the Scottish council area of Highland.

The villages of Heribost approximately 1/2 mile (800 metres) northeast, Orbost lying less than 1/2 mile (800 metres) southeast of Roag, and Ardraog lying closer to the shore are considered part of Roag. Harlosh lies on the other side of Loch Vatten.

Roag also overlooks the sea lochs Loch Na Faolinn and Loch Bracadale.

There are about 27 houses in Roag.

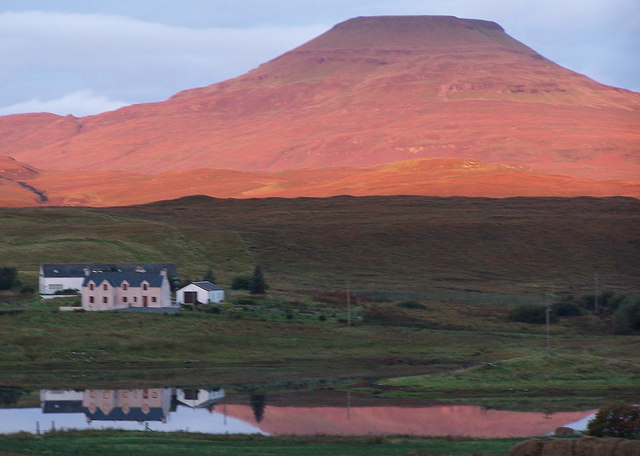
Roag at sunrise
