= Live (Peatbog Faeries album) =

Live album by Peatbog Faeries
- Released: 20 April 2009
- Recorded: Summer 2008
- Genre: Celtic fusion
- Length: 75:58
- Label: Peatbog Records

Peatbog Faeries chronology
| What Men Deserve to Lose (2007) | Live (2009) | Dust (2011) |

Professional ratings
Review scores
| Source | Rating |
|---|---|
| Adrian Denning | (7½/10) |

Live is the first live album by Scottish celtic fusion band Peatbog Faeries, released in 2009 by Peatbog Records. It is a compilation album of live tracks from two of the band's concerts in their 2008 tour, and is the band's first album to have been released in a digipak.

It was released in April 2009 to enthusiastic reviews. Craig Harris of Allmusic said the band's "loudly-lauded, energetic live show was captured for posterity" on the album. Adrian Denning gave the album a score of seven and a half out of ten, saying the album is "all in all not quite perfect on record yet Peatbog Faeries just can't help but impress you all the same." Band on the Wall said it "presents the “exciting Peatbogs’ sound” that is thrilling audiences and listeners the world over."

== Track listing ==
1. "The Anthropologist" – 4:26
2. "The Invergarry Blues" – 4:03
3. "The Locks and Rocks Reel" – 5:15
4. "Friend of Crazy Joe" – 5:13
5. "Wacko King Hako" – 5:29
6. "Still Drunk in the Morning" – 5:17
7. "The Dancing Feet Set" – 18:20
8. "Decisions, Decisions/Kevin O'Neill of Rutherglen" – 9:46
9. "Folk Police" – 6:54
10. "Caberdrone" – 6:06
11. "All About Windmills" – 4:59
