= Greentrax Recordings =

Scottish record label

- Founded: 1986
- Founder: Ian Green
- Genre: Scottish traditional music
- Location: Cockenzie, Scotland
- Official website: www.greentrax.com

Greentrax Recordings are a Scottish record label that specialises in Scottish traditional music.

== History ==
The label was founded in 1986 by former police inspector Ian Green, who played the bagpipes and was responsible for arranging folk music at the police social club. He was also involved with the magazine Sandy Bell's Broadsheet. Prior to his retirement, Green had been selling an increasing number of records at the Edinburgh Folk Club, at festivals, and via his Discount Folk Records mail order service, and continued this on retiring. He invested some of his pension into setting up the label, and the name came from a competition run by BBC Radio Scotland.

On 11 March 2024, Greentrax announced that its founder, Ian Green, had died at the age of 90.

== Artists ==
The Greentrax catalogue include releases by Gordon Duncan, RURA, Barbara Dickson, The McCalmans, Paul McKenna Band, Jean Redpath, Catherine-Ann MacPhee, Adam McNaughton, Archie Fisher, Aly Bain, Brian McNeill, Judy Small, Shooglenifty, Tony McManus, Fiddlers' Bid, Chris Stout, Willie Hunter & Violet Tulloch, Bodega, Peerie Willie Johnson, Shoormal, Ceilidh Minogue, Dick Gaughan, The Whistlebinkies, The Poozies and the Peatbog Faeries.

== See also ==
- Lists of record labels
