= Celtic fusion =

Music genre

- Stylistic origins: Celtic music; various other genres
- Cultural origins: 1970s, United Kingdom, Ireland and United States

Subgenres
- Celtic hip-hop; Celtic metal; Celtic punk; Celtic rock; Celtic reggae; Celtic new-age

Celtic fusion is an umbrella term for any modern music style which incorporates influences from Celtic music or from Celtic people.

It is a syncretic musical tradition which borrows freely from the musical traditions of all the Celtic nations and the Celtic diaspora, as well as from all styles of popular music; it is thus sometimes associated with the Pan-Celtic movement. While Celtic fusion may include authentic music from any Celtic nation, it may also feature non-traditional or non-Celtic music that has been influenced by the common characteristic of Celtic identity.

== Celtic electronica ==
The genre of Celtic electronica blends traditional Celtic influences with modern electronic music. Artists such as Martyn Bennett, Lorne Cousin, Mouth Music, Mark Saul, and Valtos (band) whose backgrounds are in traditional Celtic music tend to favor traditional instruments, melodies, and rhythms, but augment them with drum machines and electronic sounds. Others such as Brigid Boden and Niteworks approach the fusion from a background in electronic music that eschews traditional instruments and incorporates traditional melodies played on synths into a new-age-influenced trance sound. Peatbog Faeries have experimented with Celtic electronica, mainly on Faerie Stories.

== Celtic hip-hop ==
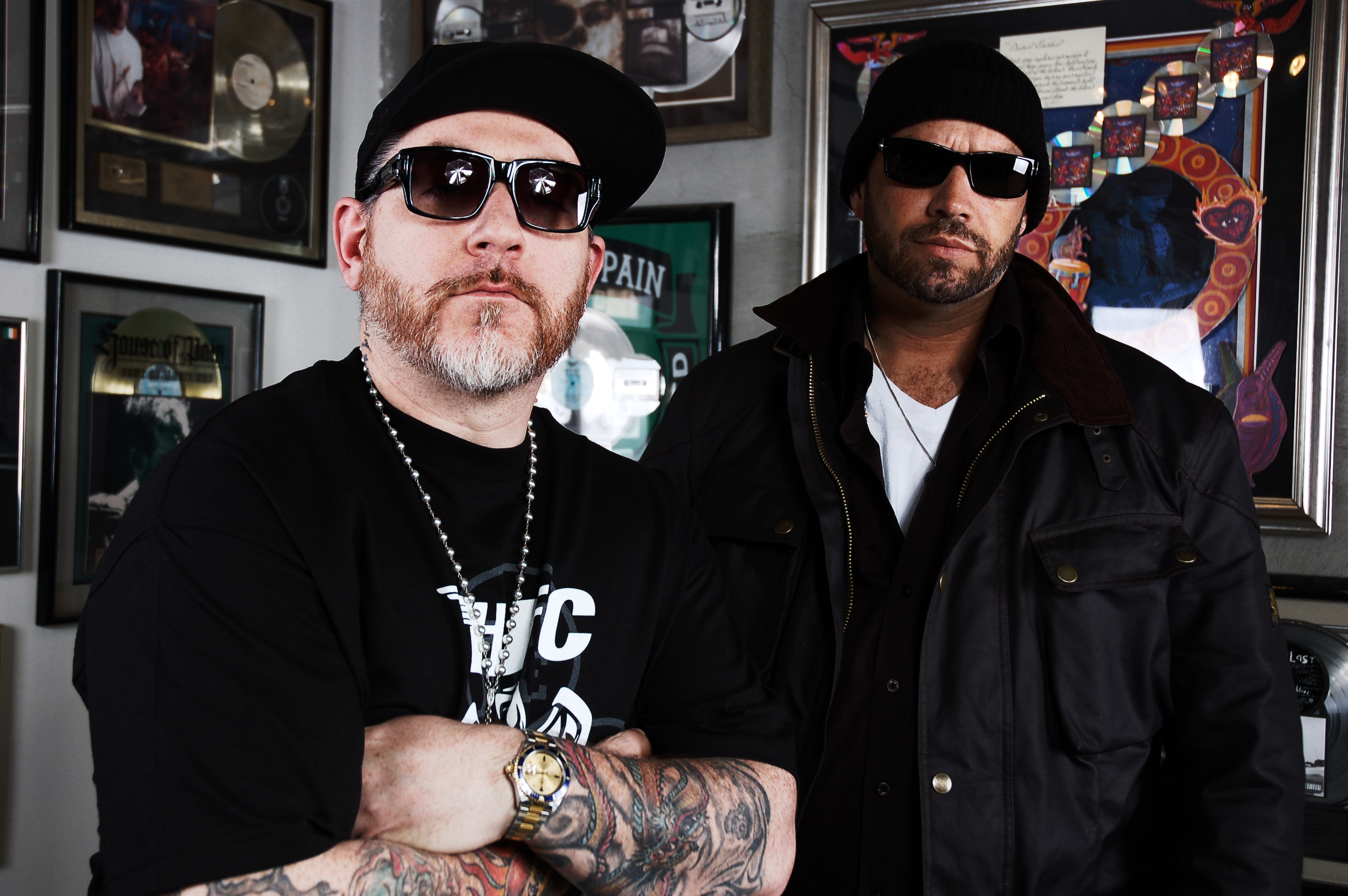
Celtic Hip-hop artists House of Pain, seen here in 2011

The first Celtic-identified hip-hop group to gain mainstream notoriety was House of Pain, a Los Angeles based group which incorporated rhymes about the Irish-American experience into their music. With a few exceptions, however, their actual instrumentation did not incorporate traditional "Celtic" instruments, though they did use time signatures typical of jigs on several songs – a major deviation in a hip-hop market where virtually everything is done in 4/4 time.

Marxman, an Irish-Jamaican hip-hop group, whose explicitly nationalist and Marxist politics gained them notoriety and infamy in the United Kingdom in the 1980s, incorporated traditional instruments into several songs on their first album, but largely abandoned them on their second album for a more electronica- and blues-oriented sound that would later form the basis for the emergence of trip hop.

Sinéad O'Connor contributed vocals to several of Marxman's songs and even tried her hand at rapping on her 1994 album Universal Mother with a track about the Great Irish Famine of 1845–1849.

Starting in 1998 Manau, a French hip-hop group of Breton origin, created the first truly consistent fusion of Celtic music and hip-hop in two critically acclaimed albums, incorporating a wide range of traditional instruments and melodies and combining them with hip-hop beats. In one of their songs, they used part of an arrangement of a traditional tune (Tri Martolod) by Alan Stivell, and were subsequently sued by him for copyright infringement.

In 2023, Limerick hip-hop artist, Strange Boy, was awarded the Liam O'Flynn Award by the Arts Council in recognition of his work blending poetry and rap with Irish traditional music. He has worked with Moya Brennan and other traditional musicians. The Belfast group Kneecap has also worked with traditional musicians including Lisa Canny from the band BIIRD, Róis and Radie Peat from Lankum.

== Celtic-influenced world music ==
Many Celtic fusion artists integrate musical traditions from all over the world into their sound. The clearest example of this is Afro Celt Sound System, the members of which bring to the band strong backgrounds in either African or Irish musical tradition. The Irish fusion group Skelpin incorporates Spanish flamenco, Middle Eastern, and American soul elements and instruments into its music. Delhi 2 Dublin , a band based in Canada, is known for fusing Irish and Indian music. Salsa Celtica is an 11-member "world fusion" project based in Edinburgh, Scotland that mixes salsa with Scottish bagpiping and world influences. Other artists such as Loreena McKennitt, Red Cardell, and Catya Maré take inspiration from numerous diverse traditions around the world, although their focus may be on Celtic music.

== Celtic jazz ==
Modern acts such as Clannad, Nightnoise, and Breton musician, Roland Becker (in the 1980s) combined Celtic music with jazz. The jazz can range from the big band swing style to the smooth jazz style.

Jack Talty's Ensemble Ériu is an Irish band that blends the minimalism and improvisatory spirit of jazz around Irish traditional melodies.

Norman&Corrie, comprising Scottish drummer Corrie Dick and multi-instrumentalist Norman Willmore of Peatbog Faeries, perform Shetlandic fiddle music reimagined as contemporary electronic-fringed jazz. The band released their debut album Twa Double Doubles in 2024.

Connemara-based group, Trá Pháidín, play music which has been described as a fusion of traditional Irish music, folk and experimental jazz with elements of art rock and krautrock.

== Celtic metal ==
Celtic metal is a subgenre of folk metal that emerged in Ireland during the early 1990s. It fuses the intensity of heavy metal with traditional Celtic music, incorporating instruments such as the tin whistle, bodhrán, and uilleann pipes. The genre is characterised by its blending of metal's aggressive elements with the melodic and rhythmic structures of Celtic folk, often drawing on themes from Irish mythology and history.

The genesis of Celtic metal is closely linked to the Irish band Cruachan, formed in 1992 by Keith Fay. Inspired by the English band Skyclad and the Irish rock group Horslips, Cruachan sought to merge black metal with Irish folk music. Their debut album, Tuatha na Gael (1995), is considered a seminal work in the genre. Around the same time, other Irish bands like Primordial and Waylander also began exploring similar musical territories, each bringing their unique interpretations to the fusion of metal and Celtic music. These bands laid the foundation for what would become a vibrant subgenre within the metal community.

Over the years, Celtic metal has expanded beyond Ireland, with bands from various countries incorporating Celtic elements into their music. Swiss band Eluveitie, for example, combines melodic death metal with Celtic melodies and instruments, even using lyrics in the ancient Gaulish language. Other notable bands include Spain's Mägo de Oz, Germany's Suidakra, and Canada's Leah, each bringing their cultural perspectives to the genre.

== Celtic new-age ==
Celtic new-age artists such as Enya, Clannad, Afro Celt Sound System, Catya Maré, Iona, and Gary Stadler incorporate traditional melodies and lyrics with synths and layered sounds to create a mellow relaxed fusion that has proven highly marketable. Enya, for example, is one of the best-selling musicians in the world.

== Celtic pop ==
Celtic pop artists such as the Corrs, Nolwenn Leroy, Saint Sister, Mimori Yusa Clannad and Gwennyn incorporate pop music elements into traditional tunes.

== Celtic punk ==
Celtic punk is punk rock mixed with traditional Celtic music. Celtic punk bands often play traditional Celtic folk songs, contemporary/political folk songs, and original compositions. Common themes in Celtic punk music include politics, Celtic culture (particularly Gaelic culture) and identity, heritage, religion, drinking and working class pride.

The genre was popularised in the 1980s by the Pogues. It is considered part of the broader folk punk genre, although that term is often used in North America for acoustic forms of punk rock rather than a mixture of traditional folk music and punk rock. The genre was reinforced in the 2000s by bands such as Dropkick Murphys and Flogging Molly.

The typical Celtic punk band includes rock instrumentation as well as traditional instruments such as bagpipes, fiddle, tin whistle, accordion, mandolin, and banjo. Like Celtic rock, Celtic punk is a form of Celtic fusion.

While popular around the world, Celtic punk is often criticised for certain non-Irish bands appropriating and misrepresenting Irish culture (perpetuating 'Plastic Paddy' stereotypes) with an excessive focus on drinking and fighting. Other folk-punk bands that incorporate traditional folk material, such as The Dreadnoughts and Cordelia's Dad, have expressed disdain at being called 'Celtic punk' despite Celtic material making up a very small portion of their overall material (either due to the common occurrence of non-Celtic folk songs being called 'Celtic,' or due to the misunderstanding that all traditional folk music mixed with punk rock is Celtic punk).

Other Celtic punk artists are the Real McKenzies, Neck, Flatfoot 56, the Tossers, Mutiny, and Black 47 (who also incorporate hip-hop influences). The genre is most popular in Ireland, Scotland, England, the United States, and Canada.

Punks singing in Celtic languages began to emerge in the late 1970s in Wales; a rather harder sound was adopted by Yr Anhrefn in the 1980s. The 2000s saw in Scotland the emergence of several Gaelic-language punk bands, such as Mill a h-Uile Rud and the genre is also represented in Brittany with Les Ramoneurs de Menhirs.

== Celtic reggae ==
The fusion of Celtic music and reggae is a hybrid started by the band Edward II and others.

== Celtic rock ==
Celtic rock is a genre of folk rock, as well as a form of Celtic fusion which incorporates Celtic music, instrumentation and themes into a rock music context. It has been prolific since the early 1970s and can be seen as a key foundation of the development of successful mainstream Celtic bands and popular musical performers, as well as creating important derivatives through further fusions. It has played a major role in the maintenance and definition of regional and national identities and in fostering a pan-Celtic culture. It has also helped to communicate those cultures to external audiences.

Modern Celtic rock acts began with the Waterboys, Alan Stivell, Gaelic Storm, Sinéad O'Connor, the Cranberries and the Proclaimers.

== Books ==
- "Irish Folk, Trad and Blues: A Secret History" by Colin Harper (2005) covers Horslips, The Pogues, Planxty, and others.
- Cunliffe, Barry, ‘The Celts: A Very Short Introduction’ (Oxford, 2003).
- Maier, Bernhard, ‘The Celts: A history from earliest times to the present’, K. Windle trans, (Edinburgh University Press, Edinburgh, 2003).

== See also ==
- List of Celtic fusion artists
