= Martin Swan =

Martin Swan (born Sheffield, England) is a Scottish multi-instrumentalist, songwriter, composer, record producer, recording engineer and instrument designer.

Swan is best known as the leader of the Mouth Music project, whose combination of traditional Gaelic songs and music with contemporary instrumental and technological settings led them to international fame and number 1 placings in world music sales charts in the early 1990s. His multi-instrumental skills and his approach towards the making of folk music (eclectic, restless and frequently non-purist) has seen him compared to a folk music version of Prince.

Swan is also involved in the restoration, manufacture and design of string instruments.

Though born in England, Swan is of Scottish descent and identifies as Scottish.

== Musical abilities ==
Martin Swan is known to play the following instruments:

- Stringed instruments: fiddle, acoustic and electric guitars, bass guitar, dulcimer, hammered dulcimer, bowed psaltery, berimbau, erhu
- Keyboard instruments: keyboards/synthesizers, accordion
- Wind instruments: concert flute, low whistle, block flute, bamboo flute, shawm
- Acoustic percussion: drum kit, bass drum, tambourine, maracas, conga, tabla, timbales, triangle, darbouka, djembe, cowbell, xylophone, bells, calabash, mbira, shaker, cabassa, cuica
- Electronics: electronic percussion, synthesizer programming, rhythm programming.

Swan also sings (mostly backing vocals, but more recently lead vocals) and whistles, and is a skilled musical arranger.

== Musical projects ==
=== Mouth Music ===
Swan has been the only consistent member of the musical project Mouth Music since its inception in 1988. Initially an equal partner with singer Talitha MacKenzie, he asserted control over the project following disagreements with MacKenzie and her subsequent departure in 1991 (MacKenzie has continued to challenge Swan's view of the "Mouth Music" concept). Since then Swan has presided over a variety of line-ups, working with musicians including Capercaillie/Shooglenifty drummer James Mackintosh, pipe/flute/fiddle player Martyn Bennett, fiddler Alison Crawford and singers Jackie Joyce (aka Helicopter Girl), Martin Furey, Mairi McInnes, Ishbel MacAskill and Michaela Rowan. Over the course of six albums and one EP, Mouth Music's music has spanned a wide variety of styles from traditional Celtic music to worldbeat, funk, electronic dance, "fiddle fusion" and more.

=== Ambisonic ===
Swan was half of the electronic pop duo Ambisonic (alongside singer Jackie Joyce), who released one album, Ecohero on Nation Records in 1997. The project was a spin-off from the third Mouth Music line-up, in which Joyce was lead singer and Swan's main co-writer and creative foil.

=== Kries ===
Swan plays fiddle for the Croatian band Kries (led by ex-Legen frontman Mojmir Novakovic). He appears on the band's second album Kocijani (which he also produced and mixed).

=== Stobo Village Band ===
In 2008, Swan began working with the Stobo Village Band, which is described as playing "fast hypnotic acoustic dance music with fiddle, pipes, accordion, tapan and darabuka, mashing up Scottish/Irish tune playing with the virtuoso traditions of eastern Europe and the Balkans." The band's line-up is Martin Swan (fiddle), Lewis Powell-Reid (accordion, guitar), Ross Ainslie (whistle, pipes, cittern), James Mackintosh (percussion) and Fraser Watson (percussion), Mackintosh has previously worked with Swan in Mouth Music.

The band made their public debut on 16 January 2008 (at the Celtic Connections concert series in Glasgow) and have continued to play ceilidhs around the Scottish Borders region.

=== Zykopops ===
In 2010, Martin Swan started a "trash folk" band called Zykopops, based in Croatia. Their first live performance was in Zagreb, in October 2010. The band's slogan ("Zykopops... worse than Turbofolk!") is apparently already gaining them notoriety throughout the Balkans. Zykopops rework classic and obscure traditional songs from Croatia, Serbia, Macedonia and Hungary using a punk- and hip-hop-inflected style which they call "rakija music" and which includes "Ramones tempos and Hajduk virtuoso nonsense." The group's stated aim is to "achieve a state of rabbit-ness and to infect others with equal rabbit-ness." Swan plays violin in the band, which is fronted by Lidija Dokuzovic and also features hip-hoppers Erol Zejnilovic and Konrad Lovrencic, along with "a random crew of percussionists, beatboxers and physical therapists" including Nenad Kovacic and Ante Prgin-Surka.

== Selected work as producer and engineer ==
In 1998, Swan remixed Martyn Bennett's Bothy Culture album.

In 2003, Swan produced and engineered Martin Furey's debut solo album Howl (on which he also played guitar using Furey's invention, the Varichord capo).

In 2006, Swan produced and engineered Nuru Kane's widely admired Sigil album (on which he also played violin and accordion).

In 2007, Swan produced and mixed the second Kries album Kocijani (released in 2008).

== Work in instrument restoration and design ==
In the mid-1990s Swan moved to the Scottish Borders and developed a second career as a woodworker (carpenter, cabinet maker and violin restorer). After cutting off the top of a finger with a woodworking machine in 2008, he decided to give up the large-scale carpentry and concentrate on restoring old violins. He soon became fascinated and exasperated by the variations in tonal quality of old violins and started researching the methods of Eastern European violin makers. This led to him designing a range of handmade violins, violas and cellos, travelling to Transylvania to choose tonewood and developing friendships with the Hungarian luthiers who now make the instruments for him.

== Discography (excluding compilations) ==
=== with Mouth Music ===
- Mouth Music (1991) 1990 Triple Earth/Rykodisc
- Blue Door Green Sea EP (1992)
- Mo-Di (1993) Triple Earth/Rykodisc
- Move On EP (1994)
- Shorelife (1995) Triple Earth
- Seafaring Man (2001) (Meta 4/Nettwerk)
- The Scrape (2003) (Skitteesh)
- The Order of Things (2005) (Skitteesh)

=== with Ambisonic ===
- Ecohero (1997, Nation Records)

=== with Kries ===
- Kocijani (2008, Kopito Records)
