= Solar Shears =

Studio album by Shooglenifty
- Released: August 2000 (UK); 9 January 2001 (US)
- Recorded: 2000, Edinburgh
- Genre: Celtic fusion; acid croft; psychedelic; experimental; worldbeat; world fusion
- Length: 44:11
- Label: Vertical Records; Compass Records
- Producer: Jim Sutherland

Shooglenifty chronology
Live at Selwyn Hall (1996)	Solar Shears (2000)	The Arms Dealer's Daughter (2003)

Solar Shears is the third studio album and fourth album overall by Scottish Celtic fusion band Shooglenifty. After the critical acclaim given to their underground second album A Whisky Kiss (1996), the band left Greentrax Recordings and signed to Vertical Records in the UK and Compass Records in the US and hired long time producer Jim Sutherland to produce their new album. The album sees the band expand their self-described "acid croft" sound, featuring a wide range of musical influences such as worldbeat, Eastern music, African music, psychedelic music, bluegrass, breakbeat and techno fused with a traditional Scottish Celtic music sound. With this album, Sutherland introduced many unorthodox approaches to the band's music, including looped beats, scratching, electro-atmospherics and sampled 'discovered sounds' from industrial clanks and rumbles to snatches of telephone conversation and recorded pelican crossing announcements.

The album was released in August 2000 the UK by Vertical Records and in January 2001 by Compass Records in the US, their first release for the label. The album was the band's first album to be released in the United States. It had received generally positive reviews from critics, complimenting its eclectic sound and wide array of influences. One critic called it "interesting and innovative," and another "a landmark album." Many also praised Sutherland's production work, although some were less favourable towards it. The band left Vertical Records and established their own label, Shoogle Records, for the follow-up, The Arms Dealer's Daughter (2003).

== Background and recording ==
Shooglenifty released their first album Venus in Tweeds in 1994 on Greentrax Recordings, four years after the band formed. The album was widely critically acclaimed. In 1995, they toured the album. One reviewer that "they took Sidmouth by storm" despite "the strange lunch time sit down concert" that was booked. They released their second album A Whisky Kiss in 1996. Considered a "groundbreaking album", it was a critical success. The first two albums saw the band develop their Celtic fusion sound. Commenting on the band's sound in his Solar Shears review, George Graham said the band's "musical amalgamation" involving "taking traditional Scottish elements, minus the bagpipes, and mixing them with techno-dance-ambient-rave rhythms, synthesizers, samples and general sonic mutations" leads to "a curious but very danceable blend." The duo toured the album throughout 1996, and their performance at Selwyn Hall, Box, Wiltshire was released as Live at Selwyn Hall in November 1996. The band left Greentrax Recordings, their only prior label and who only released the band's albums in Europe, and signed to Vertical Records in the United Kingdom and Compass Records in the United States for the release of the subsequent album.

"The album was produced by Jim Sutherland, like our last two albums, in his studio above Edinburgh's Bongo Club, which is great because that's where we rehearse and do occasional gigs. Jim is a total audio pervert: if he can fry a sound he will. He goes through every single plug, processor and file available, and spends hours trying different permutations. You've got those thousands of dollars worth of equipment but Jim is very into unorthodox approaches to get whatever sound he is looking for."

— Bassist Conrad Invitsky describing the recording process of Solar Shears.

As of 2000, the members of Shooglenifty were Malcolm Crosby on guitar, mandolin and sitar, Angus R Grant on fiddle, Garry Findlayson on banjo and a self-invented electrified instrument he named the "banjax," bassist Conrad Ivitsky, who also performs harmonica and berimbau and the percussionist James Mackintosh, an "all-important drummer in a style that generally is done without drums", credited with "drums, percussion, bass, psaltry, programming and samples". The band recorded the new album the same year with their ongoing producer-engineer Jim Sutherland in his Edinburgh studio, who handled similar duties on their previous albums. Mackintosh said that "the studio was so small and computer-oriented, it didn’t allow any more than two people playing together at the same time." An avid sonic experimenter, trying all manner of effects devices and unconventional recording techniques, Sutherland is credited on the album as performing the synthesiser and for programming. He was acknowledged as "helping this relatively conventionally instrumented band into a wild sonic ride on the album."

For the recording process itself, the band arrived with their live arrangements and Sutherland "ripped them apart". They were multi-tracked, then deconstructed and "shredded down." The album is typical of Sutherland touches, notably including many sampled 'found sounds', such as the Schipol Airport and Bern Railway Station, which are dropped into the mix. Bassist Conrad Invitsky, recalling the recording process, said that Sutherland "has a whole array of toys and he tends to play with all of them. His favourite things at the moment are a small Tandy mike, worth very little, and a little cheap plastic red speaker. On the track "Igor" he recorded all the drums through it and then used various compressors, processors and equalizers to get a fat, juicy sound." Sutherland was a perfectionist during production, trying out all the available plugs, processors and files to find sounds.

== Music ==
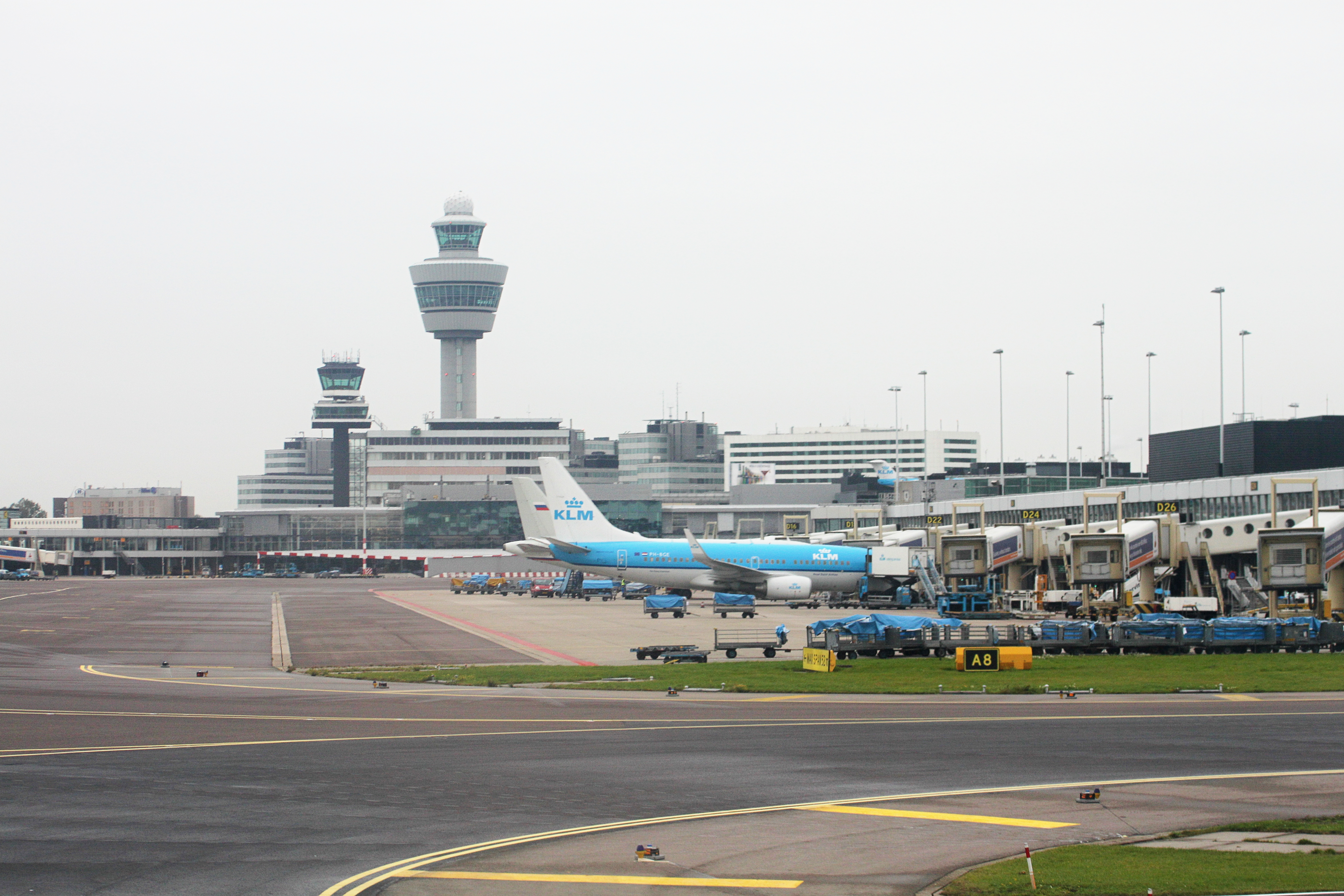
The album features numerous "found sounds", including sounds recorded at Schipol Airport.

Keith Whitham of The Living Tradition, comparing the album to their previous album A Whisky Kiss, said "in those four years essentially very little has changed. They've unquestionably become more experimental, Solar Shears is a quantum jump in production terms for the group." The album continues the band's self-coined "acid croft" sound, featuring a blend between Scottish Celtic music, various other world styles and contemporary genres such as techno and ambient. Several critics pointed out an Eastern music influence, and another bluegrass, whilst The Chicago Tribune called it a "trippy blend of tradition, psychedelia and instrumental hip-hop." The band made liberal use of distortion pedals and effects boxes in addition to pillaging DJ techniques, working in all types of looped beats, scratching, electro-atmospherics and sampled 'discovered sounds' from industrial clanks and rumbles to snatches of telephone conversation and recorded pelican crossing announcements.

George Graham said that the band "is a mostly instrumental group whose members are adept as traditional musicians on fiddle, guitar, mandolin, and even banjo. But they deliver their music through a battery of electronic devices from distortion boxes to synthesizers to sampling machines that create grooves that would fit in on the dance floor of a rave." He said that on Solar Shears, "in general," "it's the kind of album that you can't help but being drawn into, with its irresistibly danceable grooves and sometimes downright wacky combinations of sounds and influences, including some hints of Middle Eastern sensibility." Ann Flint of Rambles commented "I was surprised to hear a variety of styles and instruments all jumbled into the music, and all making for an interesting, yet confusing, mix." Describing the album as "creatively combining Scottish folk underpinnings with techno and worldbeat, Dave Sleger of Allmusic called it "akin to a modern musical jaunt around the world," where, although the band's homeland Celtic roots are most obvious, hints of Mid-Eastern, Far Eastern, and American bluegrass are evident, with a foundation that alternates between groove-heavy techno or ambient with progressive rock & roll arrangements."

The first track, "The Hijab", is said to epiotmize the band's "psychedelic techno-Celt sounds. While the music clearly hints at Celtic, the swirl of sounds from the distorted mandolin to the drum loops makes for kind of other-worldly dance groove." "Schuman's Leap" is "eclectic" and "a bit more Scottish sounding" and is dominated by Grant's fiddle, "though it is bathed in a sea of electronic cacophony." The fiddle also features prominently on the more laidback "August". "Delighted" combines traditional influences with a funky rhythm, and was described by George Graham as "one of the most downright danceable pieces on this generally danceable album." "Maggie Ann of Clachnabrochen" is the only vocal track, featuring "telephone-like" vocals. Eastern influence features on "Igor's", described by Graham as "a kind of Hungarian techno Celt dervish." "Kinky Haroosh", which features less of a Celtic influence, also features an ominous, Eastern sound and "a collection of vaguely unsettling sounds". In contrast, the closing track "Bjork's Chauffer" [sic], a two-part medley of reels with mostly initially acoustic instrumentalism, is "perhaps the most Celtic-sounding track", before the "techno-Celt" fusion of the band's usual sound returns.

== Release ==
Solar Shears was released in August 2000 in the UK by Vertical Records and on 9 January 2001 in the United States by Compass Records, their first album on both labels. It was their first album released in the United States. It became one of Music Scotland's top sellers in 2000, 2001 and 2002. The album was promoted by a website, which one publication noted was "in itself is very telling because it confirms the new age/avant garde nature of this group. Instead of wasting our time and the paper and print of putting information for the listeners onto the CD insert, which is customary, the group has a stylized meadow-scene with the group (one assumes) posed on the front, with chairs placed on their own in the grass, with the group walking up the hillside carrying chairs, and so on. Deep. Rather than giving us readable print, or a way for us to learn more or rave to others (thereby selling more CDs), the group focuses on the music."

As with the band's previous albums, it was subject to low-key promotion and as such was not a commercial triumph. Ann Flynt of Rambles said that "maybe the best way for me to characterize this group is by referring to them as misunderstood by the masses. We need to bring their music out from the underground and make it available, at least for some of the more eclectic programs on public radio, so that we can hear, and appreciate the fun and mystery of this most enigmatic group and this CD. Ironically, as I prepare to send this, for the first time that I can recall since listening to our local public radio station, Shooglenifty had a song being played, and it sounded great. Now, if they could just give the other, non-aural senses a chance to participate, I could write a more glowing review [of the album]." It was the band's only album on Vertical Records, as the left the label shortly after release, setting up their own label, Shoogle Records, for subsequent UK releases, beginning with their next album The Arms Dealer's Daughter (2003). The band's percussionist said that he thought this album was "more accessible" than Solar Shears, saying "it’s not quite a frightening in places." The band toured in promotion of Solar Shears in 2000–01, and during the Australian leg, mandolin player Luke Plumb joined the band before he became a permanent member, replacing Ian Macleod.

== Critical reception ==
Professional ratings
Review scores
Source	Rating
Allmusic	4/5 stars
The Chicago Tribune	(favourable)
Folk Roots	(favourable)
The Graham Weekly Album Review	(favourable)
The Irish Times	(favourable)
The Living Tradition	(favourable)
Rambles	(favourable)
Sight & Sound	(favourable)
Songlines	(favourable)

The album received a positive reception from critics, praising its eclectic sound and array of influences. The Irish Times said that "this is tradition standing on its head - essential listening." The Chicago Tribune were positive towards its " trippy blend of tradition, psychedelia and hip-hop." Folk Roots were also favourable, saying "seamless–a groove that is pure Celtic." Keith Whitham of The Living Tradition was favourable, saying the album "is a quantum jump in production terms for the group. However it's still the elements of banjo/mandolin dueling with Angus Grant's fine fiddle technique which remain the real musical engine room, and is still one of the most refreshing aspects of their whole approach to recording. Thankfully they don't use gadgetry to hide behind a lack of playing ability. I'd like to think that if Frank Zappa had been born on say, Benbecula, this might have been the music he would have chosen to produce." He concluded that "Shooglenifty are one of the foremost groups in the 'cool Celt' genera, and I suspect will be so for some time to come now that they have the often difficult third album out of the way. Their musical journey is always that of discovery, as each album appears and I've had time to analyse the contents, my mind moves to where they may take us to next?"

Dave Sleger of Allmusic rated the album four stars out of five and said that "clearly progressive can imply many things in popular music, but Shooglenifty should not be haphazardly lumped into the predictable prog camps, as their music really defies categorization." Songlines said the album contained "gorgeous melodies allied with killer grooves, an equal appetite for cutting edge clubland stylings and traditional dance forms," whilst Sight & Sound says it shows the band "taking their blend of traditional Scottish tunes, samples and breakbeats to further extremes. There are occasional moves towards African and East European musical styles, but Shooglenifty keep their groove pure Celtic. Shooglenifty make music which reaches parts other bands never knew existed…a compelling set dripping with high energy club vibes."

Although all reviews were favourable, some noted minor drawbacks with things other than the band's performance. Ann Flint of Rambles was very favourable to the album, calling it "interesting" and "innovative", but was unsavoury towards the uncommercial tone of its packaging and artwork, saying that "for those who like music and don't have a particular medium they favor, [the album] may be just the ticket. In some ways, it is refreshing to hear a group that isn't playing on its past glories, like the group Kiss, or made up of guys that maybe should have hung it up long ago, like anyone you can think of. So, I can say that Solar Shears is well worth listening to, with well-played, interesting, innovative music, but it would clearly make for a more commercial CD if they would at least make the lyrics, themes and print more discernible to the senses." George Graham praised most of the music, and some parts of its mastering, but was less favourable to other parts, saying that Solar Shears "is an album that can be enjoyed on a number of levels – the way the disparate styles are juxtaposed, the clever arrangements, the first-rate instrumental work – when the instruments are not being sonically morphed into something else – and the great dance groove. Techno-Celt or what they call "acid croft" may be something of a novelty, but this is an album that has enough ideas on it that it will stand up well to many a listening," however, noting that "giving this album a grade for sonic quality is difficult. Although there was a lot of creativity shown by engineer/producer Jim Sutherland, sometimes the heavy distortion used on the instruments can reach the point of being a bit irritating, while at other times, the sonic juxtapositions are downright brilliant. Obviously this is an album in which the manipulation of sound is more important than its fidelity. But where undistorted acoustic instruments are heard, they are generally rather clean, and the overall dynamic range of this album is considerably better than one might expect for as concocted a recording a this one."

In 2003, other reviewers gave their retrospective opinions on Solar Shears; Iain McQueen of The Living Tradition noted he found the album a disappointment, calling it "over produced" and saying "the sonic effects overwhelmed the strength of the tunes," whilst David Kidman of NetRhythms called it a "landmark" album with an emphasis on electronica.

== Track listing ==
1. "The Hijab" – 5:24
2. "Schuman's Leap" – 3:39
3. "Igor's" – 3:57
4. "August" – 5:20
5. "Delighted" – 4:40
6. "Maggie Ann of Clachnabrochan" – 3:11
7. "Rod's Doorway" – 4:56
8. "29 Steps" – 4:08
9. "Kinky Haroosh" – 4:15
10. "Bjorks's Chauffeur" – 4:41

== Personnel ==
- Malcolm Crosbie – electric guitar, acoustic guitar, electric sitar, mandolin
- Garry Finlayson – 5-string banjo, banjax
- Angus R. Grant – fiddle
- Conrad Ivisky – bass guitar, double bass, harmonica, berimbau
- James Mackintosh – drums, percussion, psaltery, bass
- Iain McLeod – Mandolin, Vocals

== Sources and links ==
- Solar Shears at AllMusic
