= Music of the United Kingdom =

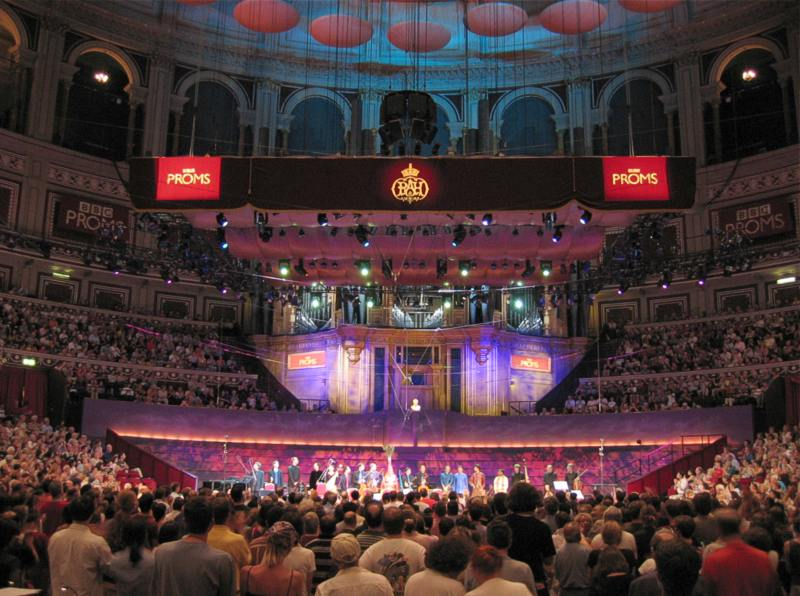
A Promenade concert at the Royal Albert Hall in 2004

Throughout the history of the British Isles, the land that is now the United Kingdom has been a major music producer, drawing inspiration from church music and traditional folk music, using instruments from England, Scotland, Northern Ireland, and Wales. Each of the four countries of the United Kingdom has its own diverse and distinctive folk music forms, which flourished until the era of industrialisation when they began to be replaced by new forms of popular music, including music hall and brass bands. Many British musicians have influenced modern music on a global scale, and the UK has one of the world's largest music industries. English, Scottish, Irish, and Welsh folk music as well as other British styles of music heavily influenced American music such as American folk music, American march music, old-time, ragtime, blues, country, and bluegrass. The UK has birthed many popular music genres such as beat music, psychedelic music, progressive rock/pop, heavy metal, new wave, industrial music, and drum and bass.

In the 20th century, influences from the music of the United States, including blues, jazz, and rock and roll, were adopted in the United Kingdom. The "British Invasion"—spearheaded by Liverpool band the Beatles, widely regarded as the most influential band of all time—saw British rock bands become highly influential around the world in the 1960s and 1970s. Pop music, a term which originated in Britain in the mid-1950s as a description for "rock and roll and the new youth music styles that it influenced", was developed by British artists like the Beatles and the Rolling Stones, whom among other British musicians led rock and roll's transition into rock music.

== Background and classical music ==
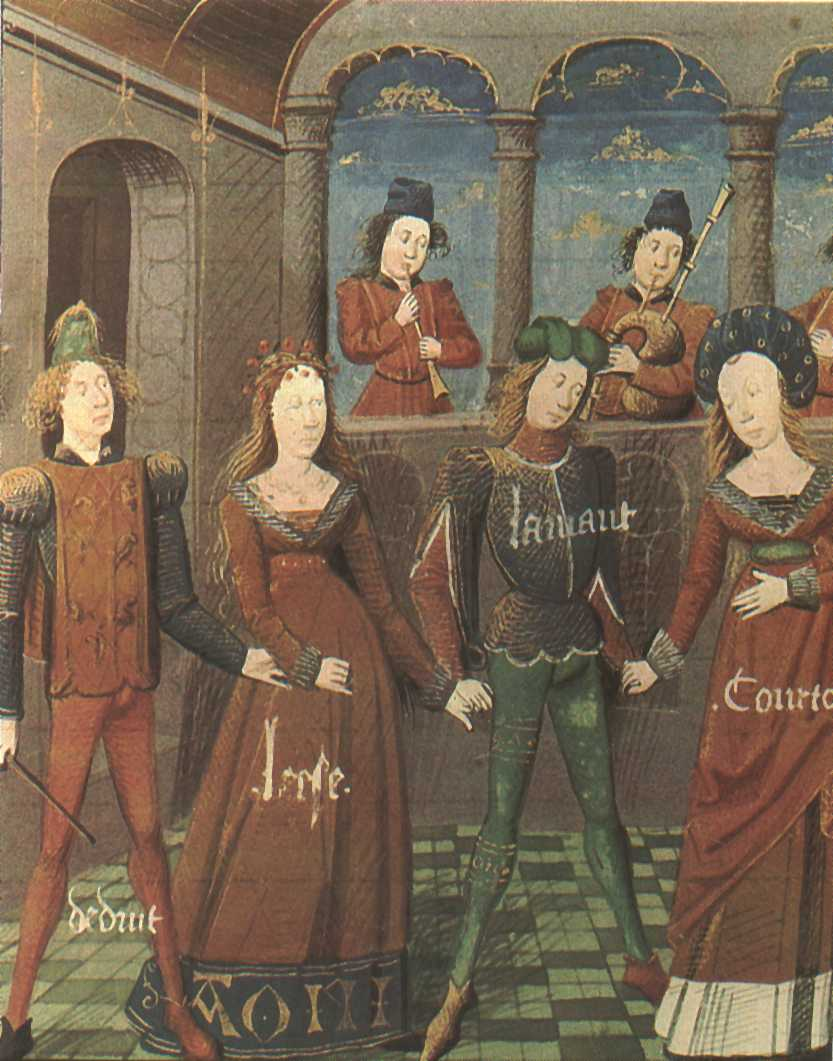
English Miniature from a manuscript of the Roman de la Rose

Music in the British Isles, from the earliest recorded times until the Baroque and the rise of recognisably modern classical music, was a diverse and rich culture, including sacred and secular music and ranging from the popular to the elite. Each of the major nations of England, Ireland, Scotland and Wales retained unique forms of music and instrumentation, but British music was highly influenced by continental developments, while British composers made an important contribution to many of the major movements in early music in Europe, including the polyphony of the ars nova and laid some of the foundations of later national and international classical music. Musicians from the British Isles also developed some distinctive forms of music, including Celtic chant, the Contenance Angloise, the rota, polyphonic votive antiphons and the carol in the medieval era.

Church music and religious music were profoundly affected by the Protestant Reformation which affected Britain from the 16th century, which curtailed events associated with British music and forced the development of distinctive national music, worship and belief. English madrigals, lute ayres and masques in the Renaissance era led particularly to English-language opera developed in the early Baroque period of the later seventeenth century. In contrast, court music of the kingdoms of England, Scotland and Ireland, although having unique elements remained much more integrated into wider European culture.

The Baroque era in music, between the early music of the Medieval and Renaissance periods and the development of fully fledged and formalised orchestral classical music in the second half of the 18th century, was characterised by more elaborate musical ornamentation, changes in musical notation, new instrumental playing techniques and the rise of new genres such as opera. Although the term Baroque is conventionally used for European music from about 1600, its full effects were not felt in Britain until after 1660, delayed by native trends and developments in music, religious and cultural differences from many European countries and the disruption to court music caused by the Wars of the Three Kingdoms and Interregnum. Under the restored Stuart monarchy the court became once again a centre of musical patronage, but royal interest in music tended to be less significant as the 17th century progressed, to be revived again under the House of Hanover.

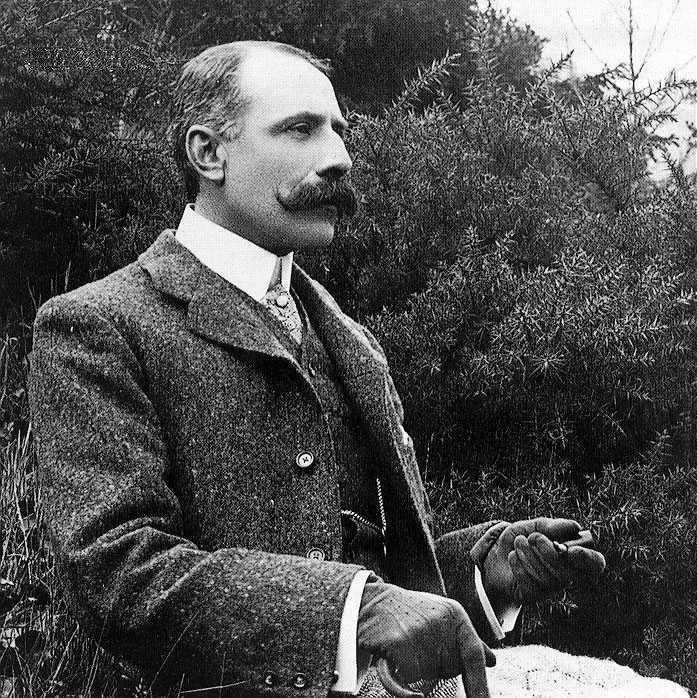
Sir Edward Elgar

British chamber and orchestral music drew inspiration from continental Europe as it developed into modern classical music. The Baroque era in British music can be seen as an interaction of national and international trends, sometimes absorbing continental fashions and practices and sometimes attempting, as in the creation of ballad opera, to produce an indigenous tradition. However, arguably the most significant British composer of the era, George Frideric Handel, was a naturalised German, who helped integrate British and continental music and define the future of the classical music of the United Kingdom that would be officially formed in 1801.

Musical composition, performance and training in the United Kingdom inherited European classical traditions of the 18th century (above all, in Britain, from the example of Handel) and saw a great expansion during the 19th century. Romantic nationalism encouraged clear national identities and sensibilities within the countries of the United Kingdom towards the end of the 19th century, producing many composers and musicians of note and drawing on the folk tradition.

These traditions, including the cultural strands drawn from the United Kingdom's constituent nations and provinces, continued to evolve in distinctive ways through the work of such composers as Arthur Sullivan, Gustav Holst, Edward Elgar, Hubert Parry, Ralph Vaughan Williams, Benjamin Britten, Michael Tippett, Peter Maxwell Davies and Harrison Birtwistle. Notable living British classical composers include Michael Nyman, James MacMillan, Jeremy Peyton Jones, Gavin Bryars, Andrew Poppy, Judith Weir, Sally Beamish and Anna Meredith.

== Folk music ==
Each of the four countries of the United Kingdom has its own diverse and distinctive folk music forms. Folk music flourished until the era of industrialisation when it began to be replaced by new forms of popular music, including music hall and brass bands. Realisation of this led to three folk revivals, one in the late-19th century, one in the mid-20th century and one at the start of the 21st century which keeps folk music as an important sub-culture within society.

=== English folk music ===
England has a long and diverse history of folk music dating back at least to the medieval period and including many forms of music, song and dance. Through three periods of revival from the late nineteenth century much of the tradition has been preserved and continues to be practiced. It led to the creation of a number of fusions with other forms of music that produced subgenres such as British folk rock, folk punk and folk metal and continues to thrive nationally and in regional scenes, particularly in areas such as Northumbria and Cornwall.

=== Gaels folk music ===
==== Northern Irish folk music ====
Ireland, including Northern Ireland, has vibrant folk traditions. The popularity of traditional instruments such as fiddles has remained throughout the centuries even as analogues in Great Britain died out. Perhaps the most famous modern musician from Northern Ireland influenced by folk tradition is Van Morrison.

==== Scottish folk music ====
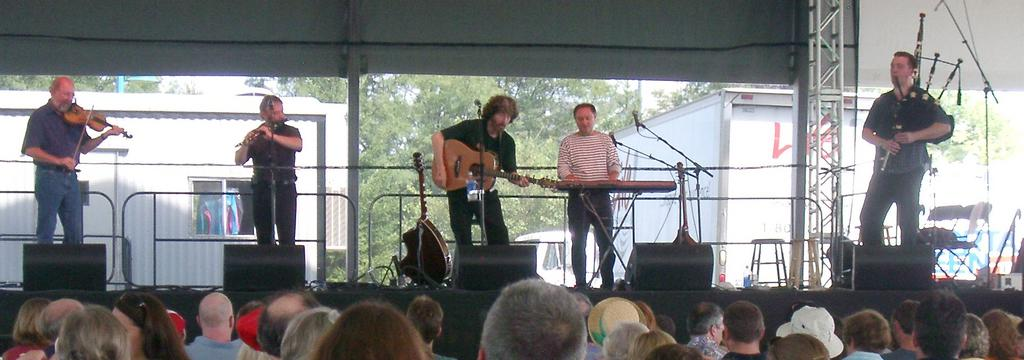
Scottish traditional group The Tannahill Weavers

Scottish folk music includes many kinds of songs, including ballads and laments, sung by a single singer with accompaniment by bagpipes, fiddles or harps. Traditional dances include waltzes, reels, strathspeys and jigs. Alongside the other areas of the United Kingdom, Scotland underwent a roots revival in the 1960s. Cathy-Ann McPhee and Jeannie Robertson were the heroes of this revival, which inspired some revolutions in band formats by groups like The Clutha, The Whistlebinkies, The Boys of the Lough and the Incredible String Band.

=== Welsh folk music ===
Wales is a Celtic country that features folk music played at twmpathau (communal dances) and gwyl werin (music festivals). Welsh music also includes male voice choirs and songs accompanied by a harp. Having long been subordinate to English culture, Welsh musicians in the late 20th century had to reconstruct traditional music when a roots revival began. This revival began in the late 1970s and achieved some mainstream success in the UK in the 1980s with performers like Robin Huw Bowen, Moniars and Gwerinos.

== Early British popular music ==
In the sense of commercial music enjoyed by the people, British popular music can be seen to originate in the sixteenth and seventeenth centuries with the arrival of the broadside ballad, which were sold cheaply and in great numbers until the nineteenth century. Further technological, economic and social changes led to new forms of music in the 20th century, including the brass band, which produced a popular and communal form of classical music. Similarly, the music hall sprang up to cater for the entertainment of new urban societies, adapting existing forms of music to produce popular songs and acts. In the 1930s, the influence of American Jazz led to the creation of British dance bands, who provided a social and popular music that began to dominate social occasions and the radio airwaves.

== Modern British popular music ==
=== Pioneering and developments ===
Britain has influenced popular music disproportionately to its size, due to its linguistic and cultural links with many countries, particularly the United States and many of its former colonies like Australia, South Africa, and Canada, and its capacity for invention, innovation and fusion, which has led to the development of, or participation in, many of the major trends in popular music. Forms of popular music, including folk music, jazz, rapping/hip hop, pop and rock music, have particularly flourished in Britain since the twentieth century.

In the early-20th century, influences from the United States became most dominant in popular music, with young performers producing their own versions of American music, including rock n' roll from the late 1950s and developing a parallel music scene. During the early 1960s, the British Invasion, led by the Beatles, further entrenched British performers as major drivers of the development of pop and rock music. According to the website of The New Grove Dictionary of Music and Musicians, the term "pop music" "originated in Britain in the mid-1950s as a description for rock and roll and the new youth music styles that it influenced".

The Oxford Dictionary of Music states that while pop's "earlier meaning meant concerts appealing to a wide audience [...] since the late 1950s, however, pop has had the special meaning of non-classical mus[ic], usually in the form of songs, performed by such artists as the Beatles, the Rolling Stones, ABBA [a Swedish act], etc." Since then, rock music and popular music contributed to a British-American collaboration, with trans-Atlantic genres being exchanged and exported to one another, where they tended to be adapted and turned into new movements.

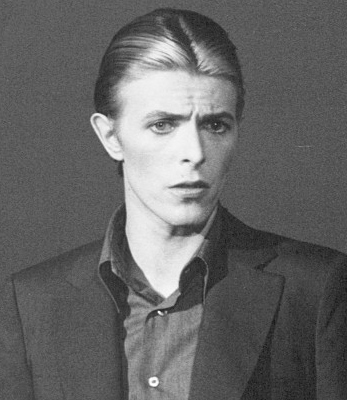
David Bowie was dubbed the "Greatest Rock Star Ever" in Rolling Stone.

Britain's most significant contribution to popular music during the 20th century was towards the expansion of rock music. Progressive rock was predicated on the "progressive" pop groups from the 1960s who combined rock and roll with various other music styles such as Indian ragas, oriental melodies and Gregorian chants, like the Beatles and the Yardbirds. According to AllMusic, the emergence of psychedelic rock in the mid-1960s resulted from British bands who made up the British Invasion of the US market. Many of the top British bands during the 1960s experienced art school during their youth, and espoused an approach based on art and originality—which came to create art rock.

As a diverging act to the popular pop rock of the early 1960s, the Rolling Stones pioneered the gritty, heavier-driven sound that came to define hard rock. Heavy metal was created by British musicians, including acts like Black Sabbath and Deep Purple. Glam rock, which was developed in the United Kingdom in the early 1970s, was performed by musicians who wore outrageous costumes, makeup, and hairstyles, particularly platform shoes and glitter—this is widely associated with David Bowie. Rolling Stone argued that the Sex Pistols, a prominent punk rock band, came to spark and personify one of the few truly critical moments in pop culture—the rise of punk during the 1970s.

Music historian Vernon Joynson claimed that new wave emerged in the UK in late 1976, when many bands began disassociating themselves from punk. Gothic rock emerged from post-punk in the United Kingdom in the late 1970s by bands including The Sisters of Mercy, Siouxsie and the Banshees, Joy Division, Bauhaus, and the Cure. Other subgenres of rock invented by or radically changed by British acts include blues rock, ska, British folk rock, folk punk, shoegaze, and Britpop.

=== Post-rock era ===
In addition to advancing the scope of rock music, British acts developed avant-funk and neo soul and created acid jazz. Whilst disco is an American form of music, British pop group Bee Gees were the most prominent performers of the disco music era in the mid-to-late 1970s, and came be to known as the "Kings of Disco" by media outlets. The Second British Invasion, which derived from the British Invasion of the US in the 1960s, consisted of music acts from the United Kingdom that became popular in the United States during the early-to-mid 1980s primarily due to the cable music channel MTV.

These synthpop and new wave associated acts often featured on the American pop charts, and according to Rolling Stone, brought "revolution in sound and style". New Pop became an umbrella term used by the music industry to describe young, mostly British, androgynous, and technologically oriented artists such as Culture Club and Eurythmics. Boy George of Culture Club was a leading figure in the new romantic movement which became a major part in the Second British Invasion of the US. British rock bands, most notably Def Leppard and Iron Maiden, also became part of the renewed popularity of British music. Newsweek magazine ran an issue which featured Scottish singer Annie Lennox of Eurythmics and Boy George on the cover of its issue with the caption Britain Rocks America – Again, while Rolling Stone would release an "England Swings: Great Britain invades America's music and style. Again." issue in November 1983. Pop-star George Michael was one of the most popular acts of the MTV Generation, cementing this position with his hugely successful Faith album in 1987.

During most of the 1990s, Cool Britannia—a period of increased pride in the culture of the United Kingdom, inspired by the 1960s Swinging Sixties—was coined due to the success of the girl band Spice Girls and Britpop acts Blur and Oasis, which led to a renewed feeling of optimism in the United Kingdom following the pessimistic tone of the 1970s and 1980s. The electronic subgenres trip hop, dubstep, and industrial originated in Britain during the 1990s. During the 21st century, blue-eyed soul came to be dominated by British singers, including Amy Winehouse, Duffy and most notably Adele, who has broken several sales and chart records. Adele has won more Grammy Awards than any other woman who was born outside the US. This wave of popular British soul singers led to a consideration of whether a third British Invasion was taking place—this time a soul invasion—in contrast to the 1960s rock and pop, and 1980s new wave and synthpop invasions.

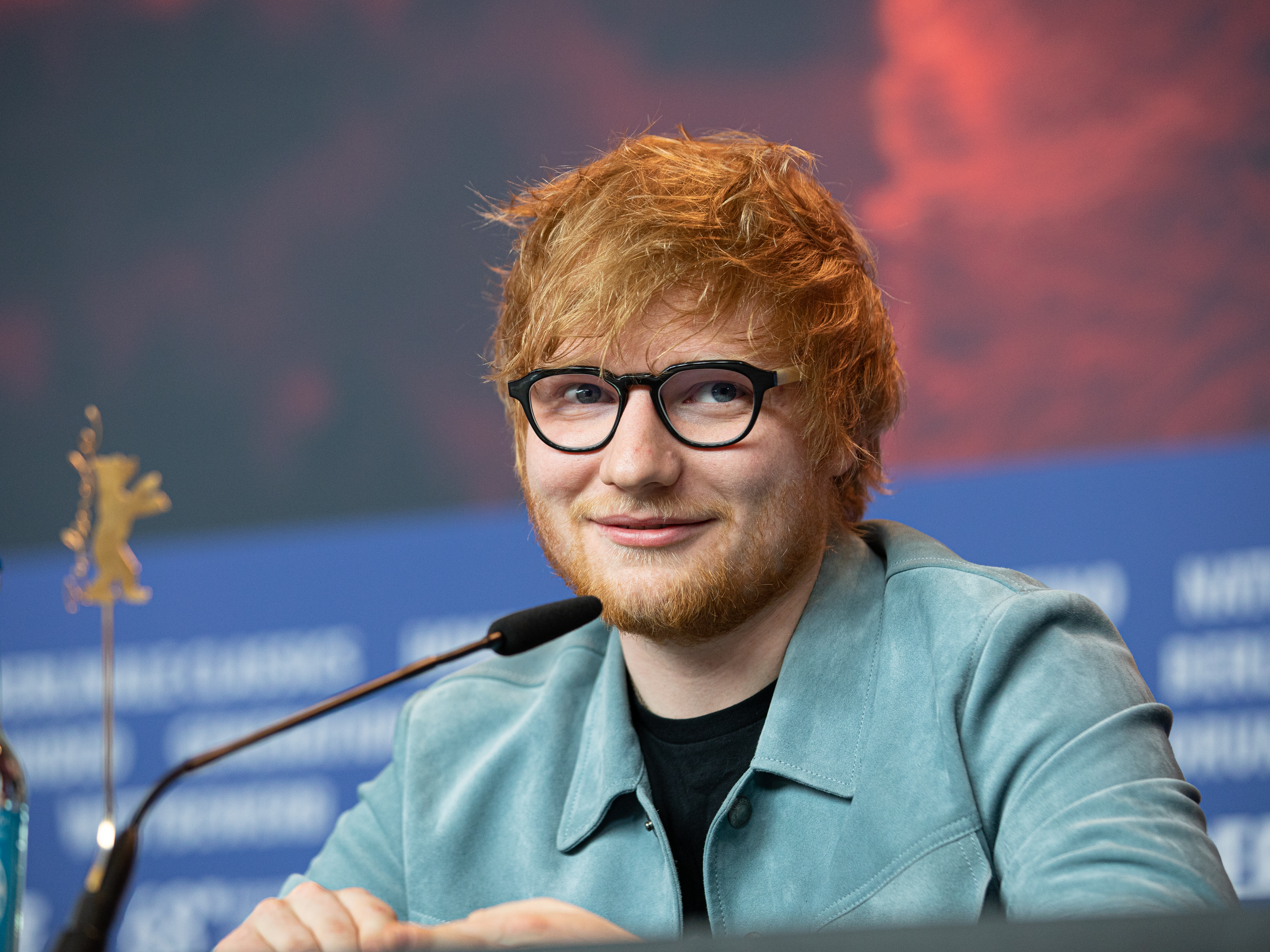
Ed Sheeran's ÷ Tour became the highest-grossing of all time in August 2019.

English singer Ed Sheeran was the foremost folk-orientated artist of the 2010s; the Official Charts Company named him artist of the decade, with the most combined success in the UK album and singles charts in the 2010s. Globally, Spotify named Sheeran the second most streamed artist of the decade. London formed English-Irish pop boy band One Direction were one of the biggest teen idols of the 2010s. Little Mix, a pop girl group and the winner of the eight series of the British version of The X Factor, established themselves as the UK's biggest girl group and one of the best-selling girl groups in the world.

=== Immigration musical impact ===
Highlighting the influence of immigrants in the United Kingdom during the 21st century, British African-Caribbean people created grime, Bashment, Dubstep, Jungle and afroswing. Grime has been described as the "most significant musical development within the UK for decades." In addition, British Asians have popularised Bhangra within the South Asian diaspora.

== See also ==
- Culture of the United Kingdom
- List of music festivals in the United Kingdom
