= 21st Century Boogie =

Studio album by Paddy Milner
- Released: June 24, 2002
- Recorded: Gallery Studios
- Genre: blues, jazz, pop
- Label: Launch Records

Paddy Milner chronology
21st Century Boogie (2002)	Walking on Eggshells (2004)

21st Century Boogie is the debut album by Paddy Milner, released on June 24, 2002.

Paddy Milner's music shows many influences ranging from pop-rock through to jazz, classical and British folk. 21st Century Boogie shows his attention to blues and boogie-woogie.

It was released to a flood of outstanding reviews, solidly sealing his reputation as one of the most original musicians. During the year of release on Paul Jones's Radio 2 show, the album was placed in the year's top ten records, whilst Milner himself was shortlisted for the British Blues Keyboard Player of 2002. Jools Holland has become a fan, telling Milner "You make the piano sing".

== Track listing ==
1. "Walking on Eggshells"
2. "21st Century Boogie"
3. "I'm Ready"
4. "Swannee River Samba"
5. "The Days, the Nights"
6. "Highway of Sound"
7. "Prelude to Caravan"
8. "Caravan"
9. "Late Nights Playing the Blues"
10. "Prelude to the Bumble Fumble"
11. "The Bumble Fumble"
12. "Boogie Woogie Time of Year"
13. "The World is Getting Smaller Everyday"
