= Mouth Music =

Scottish musical group

- Origin: Edinburgh, Scotland
- Genres: Celtic fusion, folk, worldbeat, world music, pop, electronic
- Years active: 1988–1997; 2001–present
- Labels: Triple Earth/Rykodisc (1988–1997); Skiteesh (2001–present)
- Members: Martin Swan; Martin Furey; Michaela Rowan
- Past members: Martyn Bennett; Jeremy Black; Alison Crawford; Lamin Jassey; Jackie Joyce; Ishbel MacAskill; George Macdonald; Willie Macdonald; Talitha MacKenzie; James Mackintosh; Quee McArthur; Jaq Ferry; Mairi McInnes; Andy Thorburn; Malcolm Shields; Jim Sutherland
- Website: Official website

Mouth Music is a Scottish-inspired musical project founded in 1988, whose combination of traditional Gaelic songs and music with contemporary instrumental and technological settings led them to international fame in the early 1990s.

Mouth Music has featured a variety of musicians over the years, with songwriter, multi-instrumentalist and producer Martin Swan as the only consistent member (and de facto leader). Other musicians who have passed through the project include singers Talitha MacKenzie, Jackie Joyce (aka Helicopter Girl), Martin Furey, Jaq Ferry, Màiri MacInnes, Ishbel MacAskill and Michaela Rowan, plus fiddler Alison Crawford, Capercaillie/Shooglenifty drummer James Mackintosh, and pipe/flute/fiddle player Martyn Bennett.

Swan has commented "I've never seen Mouth Music as a group. It's always been me with different people joining to play live."

The name "Mouth Music" is an English translation of the Gaelic term puirt a beul – the vocalisation of instrumental music.

== 1988–1991 (the original band) ==
=== Roots and formation ===
Mouth Music was initially an equal collaboration between Martin Swan and singer Talitha MacKenzie.

At the time of the band's formation, Swan (born in Sheffield, England, but of Scottish descent) was an Edinburgh-based composer, engineer and multi-instrumentalist with diverse musical interests including traditional Scottish folk, jazz, funk and electronic dance music. MacKenzie (born in New York) was a talented Scottish-American singer, pianist and ethnomusicologist who had taught herself Scottish Gaelic during her teen years. Conservatory-trained, her history and interests included teaching, Eastern European music and choral music: she had released a solo album called Shantyman! in 1986 (under the name of Talitha Nelson), had briefly been a member of the Boston-Irish band St James Gate and had toured America as a solo act or performing puirt a beul with Scottish traditional music bands. Having previously visited Scotland to make field recordings of folk music and research her own Scottish cultural heritage, MacKenzie moved to Scotland in 1987 and promptly joined the Scottish folk music ensemble Drumalban (in which she worked with unorthodox bagpipe and violin virtuoso Martyn Bennett).

Swan first encountered Mackenzie in 1988 when she was performing traditional Gaelic tunes at a concert in a village hall in South Uist. He persuaded her to collaborate with him on a new project fusing Gaelic music with contemporary technology and a developing world music sensibility (at least partially inspired by Fourth World music experiments such as David Byrne and Brian Eno's 1981 album My Life in the Bush of Ghosts). Working with arranger and engineer Chic Medley, the duo began to record together. Mackenzie brought in most of the early Mouth Music repertoire in the shape of traditional Gaelic songs which she had discovered while studying Scottish and Gaelic cultures in Edinburgh.

=== Debut album ===
The project's eponymous debut album Mouth Music was released on the Triple Earth/Rykodisc label in 1990 (1991 in some territories). Musically, the album blended Gaelic word rhythms with electric and acoustic instrumentation (including fiddles and sparse electric guitars) and computer samples. MacKenzie handled the vast majority of the vocals and vocal arrangements, with Swan providing all instrumentation and electronic programming. Martyn Bennett also contributed to the album, playing pipes and fiddle.

The album included Mouth Music treatments of traditional waulking songs, old chanteys (sea shanties) marking coastal landmarks, John Cameron's 19th-century lament "Chi Mi Na Mórbheanna" and a version of the reel "Seinn O!" set to a contemporary techno beat by Swan. This and other arrangements provided an African feel to some of the tracks, which has led to the categorisation of Mouth Music as an early Afro-Celtic music project, anticipating the later work of projects like the Afro-Celt Sound System.

Mouth Music was a critical and commercial success, reaching number one on the Billboard Top World Music Albums chart as well as topping the Music Week chart. The album also picked up a broad set of poll wins and industry recommendations including listings in Folk Roots magazine's 'Albums Of the Year', Q Magazine's Recommended Releases of 1990', The Guardian's 'Pick Of The Year' and CMJ's 'Best Of 1991 (USA)'.

In reviews, Q Magazine labelled the album "surely the most innovative worldly sound of 1990…(it) represents a giant, mesmeric leap on from Clannad as "Harry's Game" was in its time," while the Guardian described it as "ethereal and utterly absorbing." Entertainment Weekly was particularly enthusiastic, commenting that "this magical treat is a reminder that world music means more than just African or Brazilian exotica. It's any style that takes its soul from a particular tradition and its brains from more global sensibilities — it's the sound of many cultures chatting to each other." While criticising Swan's solo instrumentals as "pretty but unfortunately sound(ing) too much like New Age wallpaper", the reviewer concluded that “the sources are treated with muscle as well as respect… Mackenzie's sinewy voice and the deliciously knotty Gaelic lyrics are the album's strong suits… Mouth Music's combination of intelligence, beauty, and nerve has the power to unite both world-beatniks and mainstream rock fans in mutual exhilaration.”

=== Swan and Mackenzie dissolve partnership ===
Swan and MacKenzie parted company in June 1991, when MacKenzie's goal of bringing Gaelic music into the popular mainstream clashed with Swan's desire to abandon the focus on Gaelic and incorporate more aspects of modern esoteric instrumental music. Following the somewhat acrimonious split, MacKenzie resumed her solo career, while Swan retained the Mouth Music name (as well as his ongoing technical partnership with arranger Chic Medley).

Swan has subsequently claimed that the first Mouth Music album was intended, right from the start, to be a one-off project. Mackenzie has stated that she considers her post-Mouth Music solo albums Sòlas and Spiorad to be a truer continuation of the project ("(it's) not a band...it's a genre and a way of performing music.").

== Transitional period and Blue Door Green Sea EP (1992) ==
The first post-MacKenzie Mouth Music release was the Mouth Music & Mairi MacInnes EP Blue Door Green Sea in 1992. For this EP, Swan's instrumentation was augmented by contributions from Shooglenifty (and future Capercaillie) drummer James Mackintosh, and from Martyn Bennett (who returned to play flute and pipes). Màiri MacInnes was an up-and-coming award-winning traditional Gaelic singer (who had also previously recorded with Runrig). She had been called in at the last minute to take MacKenzie's place in a coast to coast North American tour in 1991, booked after the Mouth Music album had spent 5 weeks at No 1 in the Billboard World Music Charts.

Blue Door Green Sea featured three songs – "'S Muladach Mi", "The 45 Revolution/Reel For Drambuie" (a version of a piece recorded by Swan and Bennett for a Drambuie whisky advertisement) and a new dance mix of “Seinn O!” from the debut album. It was well received, with New Musical Express tagging it as "smart 'n' bad-assed music of the 21st Century" and Billboard describing Mouth Music's continued fusion of music as "a global formula that works ... in all a wonderful record that deserves all the attention [it's getting]." The EP also reached number 1 in both the CMJ New Music Chart and the Billboard World Music Chart.

== The worldbeat pop period (1993–1995) ==
=== New collaborators ===
Following the departure of Mairi MacInnes, Swan began working with a new creative and vocal foil – singer-songwriter Jackie Joyce, a Dundee-born singer of Ghanaian descent. A new Mouth Music lineup took shape featuring Swan, Joyce and Mackintosh plus Gaelic singer Michaela “Kaela” Rowan, Andy Thorburn (accordion and vocals), Malcolm Shields (percussion and vocals) and alto saxophonist George Macdonald.

=== Mo-Di album ===
This line-up went on to record the second Mouth Music album, 1993’s Mo-Di (named for the phonetic title of one of the songs on the album, "Maudit", French for "cursed"). Mo-Di displayed notable musical changes from the traditional Gaelic approach of the debut album. Although Gaelic music was still a strong ingredient, it was now simply one of several, counterbalanced by stronger elements of funk and French and African-inflected music (including a vegetarian song based on a Xhosa chant) as the band moved closer to a worldbeat sound. Swan was even moved, at one point, to address his listeners as "y'all", funk-style.

Entertainment Weekly's review of Mo-Di was decidedly cooler than the one for its predecessor, with reviewer Ty Burr stating "the only thing Mo-Di has in common with 1991's magical Mouth Music is instrumentalist Martin Swan, who now plies his pleasantly rude world music/New Age/Celtic confabulations as part of a quintet. The jazzier arrangements feel a little forced, and the vocals are less powerful. But these guys still leave Enya face down in the dirt."

The West Highland Free Press (a newspaper with strong connections to the Gaelic music community) was less impressed. Their critic Jim Wilkie commented "By perceiving Gaelic music in terms of its underlying rhythms they have guiltlessly slotted it into a world music bag and as a result have travelled far in a short time. Well, to America anyway… The new album—Mo-Di—is more reminiscent of My Life In) The Bush Of Ghosts, the David Byrne/Brian Eno cross-cultural collaboration. There is much eco-spiritualism in evidence and less Gaelic than before but the track I like is the walking standard “He Mandu”. Culturally it is all wrong: the Gaelic is bammy, liberties are taken with the melody and the beat is shifted to the back of the bar. It is really nothing to do with Gaelic in fact, except that it recognises a classic, simple rhythm and melody, has great energy and will go down a treat with the young, international club/ceilidh audience at which it is obviously aimed."

Despite the less enthusiastic critical response, Mo-Di was nearly as successful as its predecessor in the Billboard Top World Music Albums (rising to number two).

=== Shorelife album ===
By 1995, Thorburn and Shields had both left the band. They were replaced by percussionist Jeremy Black, by Quee McArthur (Mouth Music's first full-time electric bass guitarist) and by a third singer, Willie Macdonald.

The new lineup recorded Shorelife album that year, which demonstrated that Mouth Music was now committed entirely to a worldbeat sound. Shorelife was effectively an album of glossy pop songs with elements of Afro-funk decorated by Celtic reels and vocal melodies (the latter were predominantly supplied by Michaela Rowan, while Jackie Joyce delivered the main melody and lyric). During this period, Swan was disavowing an allegiance between Mouth Music and "the Gaelic-Celtic fringe" mentioned by interviewers. In an interview with 4th Door Review, he asserted "We don't connect up with it in any way, except that various people in the band play in more traditional bands that aren't geared towards recording or performing in large environments, but get together for a session in a pub. That's about as close as we come to traditional music. The first album was entirely Gaelic.The second album and since have gone off on a completely different angle."

Mainstream press reviews were generally enthusiastic but reflected the band's movement towards mainstream pop. Q described the album as "certainly demanding more than cult attention" while Billboard commented "Shorelife has the potential to keep charting for months to come". In keeping with this, Shorelife was Mouth Music's third number 1 hit on the Billboard World Music chart.

The cover of Shorelife featured a full-frontal nude photograph of a crouching Joyce superimposed over a pink perspex seashell. It attracted considerable attention and was used for an eye-catching poster campaign. Triple Earth boss Iain Scott later commented "the cover was designed as a "fuck off, we're not a world music group" statement, but the main result in that area was to be impounded by Japanese customs. It's the pubic hair, apparently. Ho hum ..." Later issues of the record featured the seashell only, and a later reissue featured a less controversial image of Joyce's face as she held a miniature version of the shell to her ear.

== Second split (1996–1997) ==
By the time of the release of Shorelife, Mouth Music were in the process of disintegrating again, partly due to unspecified "external factors" and partly from internal tensions. The band signed to Nation Records and spent a year working on a projected third album. However, this was never completed and the band split up during the process, although James Mackintosh was to retain his long-term connection with Swan. Quee McArthur would also later join Mackintosh in Shooglenifty.

=== The Ambisonic side project ===
Martin Swan and Jackie Joyce continued to work together despite the split of Mouth Music. Setting aside Celtic music, they developed a new electronic-music-based project called Ambisonic. Collaborating with comic-strip artist Simon Fraser, they developed a story for a concept album called Ecohero. Fraser recalls that the plot concerned "the arrival on Earth of an alien superbeing and his decision to champion the environment. It starred the eponymous Ecohero, his inventor mother who was trapped inside a telephone, and a psychoanalytic haddock. This is pretty much par for the course with concept albums, they are what tends to happen when you give musicians enough rope… I did rip off the plot pretty much from the Superman origin story and I swiped one of the best scenes from The Dark Knight Returns wholesale."

Ecohero was released on Nation Records in 1997. The album flopped, effectively ending the working relationship between Swan and Joyce; one of its tracks, "Helicopter Kind of Girl", was featured as the opening song of the Gucci by Tom Ford fall/winter 1997/98 fashion show, which Naomi Campbell opened. Joyce would eventually resurface in 2000 as Helicopter Girl, having embraced a soul/trip hop direction and ditched her precise folk-inflected vocals for a theatrical Eartha Kitt rasp. Helicopter Girl's debut album How To Steal The World would be nominated for a Mercury Music Prize.

== Relaunch and return to folk music (2001–present) ==
=== Seafaring Man album (2001) ===
The next Mouth Music record did not emerge for another four years, during which Swan relocated from Edinburgh and moved into a forester's cottage on an estate in the Scottish Borders in order to refresh his outlook. In an interview with World Beat Planet, he recalled "I messed around with a lot of non-essential stuff in Edinburgh… When you are surrounded by seasonal change, you are more aware of the passing of time." During this time, Swan also developed his career as a producer and engineer, most notably with Martyn Bennett’s Bothy Culture album in 1998 (which he remixed).

Mouth Music returned in 2001 with the Seafaring Man album. Originally intended for Paddy Moloney's Wicklow Records, it was eventually released on Martin Swan's own Skiteesh label following the collapse of Wicklow. Seafaring Man featured a firm return to Gaelic traditional music and a more acoustic approach (although maintaining African rhythms and electronic dance grooves underneath the traditional instrumentation) It featured Swan on the majority of instruments, with only James Mackintosh and Michaela Rowan returning from the previous Mouth Music lineup. Other contributions were made by Ishbel MacAskill (vocals), Bohinta's Martin Furey (vocals, uilleann pipes), Martyn Bennett (shehnai) and Jim Sutherland (bodhran). In an interview with World Beat Planet, Swan paid particular tribute to his Seafaring Man vocal collaborators, saying "I think I've now found exactly the sort of voices I'd always been searching for but had despaired of finding."

In his review of the album in Songlines, Nigel Williamson called it "[Swan's] most confident take yet on the Gaelic tradition which continues to lie at the core of the sound. There are subtle beats and grooves dropped into the mix, but swan has mostly chosen to rely on acoustic instruments (rather than samples or programmes) to create his increasingly stripped-down musical textures. He has also employed a flurry of fine vocalists…[Swan] has reached a perfect synthesis in what he does, so that it's well-nigh impossible to tell which are contemporary compositions, and which carry the weight of tradition. Which is what makes this such a special release." Rick Anderson on AllMusic decided that the album's "resulting fusion, while still powerful, is not quite as compelling as that of their first two albums." But it is still "recommended highly".

=== The Scrape album (2003) ===
A fifth album, The Scrape, followed in 2003. At this point the group was predominantly instrumental and consisted of Swan, Mackintosh (now with a greatly expanded percussion role), Alison Crawford (fiddle) and second percussionist Lamin Jassey. The album focussed heavily on fiddle playing and drew on source material from Scottish fiddler Alasdair Fraser, legendary Bulgarian singer Georgi Chilingirov and Irish-American fiddler Liz Carroll. It was also the first Mouth Music album not to feature any synthesizers (with Swan restricting his playing to fiddle, guitar, accordion and assorted percussion).

Reviewing The Scrape for Mojo, Colin Urwin commented "Swan has now turned (Mouth Music) into a menacing barrage of sinister fiddle – with as many Scandinavian and Eastern European influences as Celtic – with the recent recruitment of Alison Crawford as double-pronged string attack… The result is a big barren sound that goes against most preconceptions of fiddle music, yet is so earthy and harsh that it's impossible to ignore or indeed resist. Stark and daring, an album that will polarise opinion."

On his own website, Martin Swan describes the album as "A bit embarrassing. Please don't buy this one."

=== Order Of Things album (2005) ===
Mouth Music's sixth and last album to date, Order Of Things, was released in 2005 in both CD and download format. For this album the band formally consisted of a trio of Swan, Martin Furey (vocals, uilleann pipes, whistle) and a returning Michaela Rowan (vocals). Swan once again mixed his instrumentation between electric/electronic (keyboards, electric guitars and bass) and acoustic (fiddle, accordion, percussion, whistle, and the Chinese erhu fiddle). Swan also played acoustic guitar for the first time on a Mouth Music record, and sang four of the nine songs himself. Though not credited as a band member this time, James Mackintosh contributed drums to several songs.

Order Of Things contained six original songs by Swan, a version of "Roisin Dubh" (the notorious Irish republican love song to Ireland) and a version of the song "The Dae Doers", which is the oldest known written Scottish music extant. The album was another predominantly acoustic recording, but with "moments of high distorted drama" The themes included "death, speechlessness, paternity disputes, underwater sex, and the films of Akira Kurosawa” with Swan commenting "these are surely more legitimate themes for the modern troubadour than the love of boys & girls or disdain for the military-industrial complex."

NetRhythms called the album "another supremely hypnotic, quietly haunting set", praising the "superb percussion contributions from guest James Mackintosh" and "the thoughtful and imaginative touches" found throughout the album.

== Discography ==
- Mouth Music (1991) 1990 (Triple Earth/Rykodisc
- Blue Door Green Sea EP (1992)
- Mo-Di (1993) Triple Earth/Rykodisc
- Move On EP (1994)
- Shorelife (1995) Triple Earth
- Seafaring Man (2001) (Meta 4/Nettwerk)
- The Scrape (2003) (Skitteesh)
- The Order of Things (2005) (Skitteesh)
