= Mouth music =

Mouth music may refer to:

- Puirt a beul, a Scottish traditional music style
- Mouth Music (band), a band who sings in that style

== See also ==
- A capella singing
- Scat singing
- Vocal percussion
