= The Rough Guide to Scottish Music (1996 album) =

Compilation album by Various artists
- Released: 2 July 1996
- Genre: World, Scottish music
- Length: 73:02
- Label: World Music Network

Full series chronology
Global Partnership II (1995)	The Rough Guide to Scottish Music (1996)	Best of Africa (1995)

The Rough Guide to Scottish Music is a world music compilation album originally released in 1996. The third release of the World Music Network Rough Guides series, it cuts through a broad swathe of Scottish music, focusing largely on roots revival. The compilation was produced by Phil Stanton, co-founder of the World Music Network.

Adam Greenberg of AllMusic gave the album three stars and stated that while the album lacked the absolute newest forms of Celtic music, it was still "a fine introduction into contemporary Scottish music, keeping an eye on its influences from traditional forms." Michaelangelo Matos, writing for the Chicago Reader, wrote that while Scottish music is "generally too sentimental for my blood", the compilers deserve a nod for including Scottish techno.

== Track listing ==
No.	Title	Artist	Length
1.	"Ballavanich"	Wolfstone	4:39
2.	"Chi Mi'n Geamhradh"	Catherine-Ann MacPhee	4:57
3.	"Claire in Heaven"	Capercaillie	3:54
4.	"The 8-Step Waltz"	The Iron Horse	4:02
5.	"Seinn O"	Talitha MacKenzie	5:36
6.	"Wigtown Fanfare"	Ring O Steall	1:01
7.	"The Scots Callan O'Bonnie Dundee"	The Cast	5:20
8.	"Erin Go Bragh"	Dick Gaughan	4:28
9.	"The Unicorn Set"	The Tannahill Weavers	6:26
10.	"A Midwinter Waltz"	The Boys of the Lough	4:21
11.	"The Sally Gardens"	Heather Heywood	5:04
12.	"Mairead Nan Cuiread / The Bob Parsons Strathspey"	Tannas	4:40
13.	"Galicia Revisited"	Ceolbeg	6:20
14.	"The Brown Milkmaid / Dunnottar Castle / Maid of Glengarrysdale / Disused Railway"	The Battlefield Band	4:41
15.	"Just a Dream"	Bert Jansch	3:39
16.	"Finbar Saunders"	Old Blind Dogs	3:54

Professional ratings
Review scores
Source	Rating
Allmusic	3/5 stars
