= Live at Selwyn Hall =

Live album by Shooglenifty
- Released: 13 November 1996
- Recorded: Selwyn Hall, Box, Wiltshire
- Genre: Celtic
- Length: 53:49
- Label: WOMAD

Shooglenifty chronology
Whisky Kiss (1996)	Live at Selwyn Hall (1996)	Solar Shears (2001)

Live at Selwyn Hall, an album by Shooglenifty, was released in 1996 on the WOMAD label. It was recorded at Selwyn Hall, the village hall of Box, Wiltshire.

== Track listing ==
No.	Title	Length
1.	"The Pipe Tunes: John McKenzie's Fancy/The Kitchen Piper"	6:07
2.	"The Radical Road: The Radical Road/Lexie Macaskill"	4:22
3.	"Two Fifty to Vigo"	5:54
4.	"Hoptsoi"	6:35
5.	"Venus in Tweeds"	5:19
6.	"Waiting for Conrad"	8:07
7.	"Good Drying: Flick It Up and Catch It/The Creepy Zone/Good Drying"	5:13
8.	"Da Eye Wifey: Da Eye Wifey/Wood's No. 1"	6:51
9.	"The Tammienorrie: The Tamminorrie/Leo Elsey's Reel/Le Reel des Voyageurs"	5:21
Total length:		53:49

== Sources and links ==
- Live at Selwyn Hall at AllMusic
