= Troots =

Studio album by Shooglenifty
- Released: 20 January 2007
- Genre: Celtic fusion
- Length: 49:03
- Label: Shoogle

Shooglenifty chronology
| Radical Mestizo (2005) | Troots (2007) |

Professional ratings
Review scores
| Source | Rating |
|---|---|
| Allmusic | link |
| The Guardian | link |

Troots is an album by Scottish celtic fusion band Shooglenifty. It was released on 20 January 2007 on the band's Shoogle Records label.

== Track listing ==
1. "McConnell's Rant" – 3:54
2. "Excess Baggage" – 3:32
3. "She's a Keeper/The Lead Break/The Trim Controller" – 6:14
4. "Charlie And The Professor/The Tap Inn/The Dazzler" – 5:53
5. "Laureen's Tune" – 3:01
6. "Ful' Tae The Heid O' Troots/Ako Umram Il Zaginam/32 Bars of Filth" – 6:34
7. "The Eccentric" – 4:41
8. "The Patient Nurses/Wattle Grove/Another Bucket of Eels" – 5:50
9. "Walter Douglas MBE" – 4:26
10. "Jane's Dance" – 4:58
