= The Iron Horse (Scottish band) =

Scottish Celtic music band

The Iron Horse was a Scottish Celtic music band formed in 1990. During the 1990s the band, along with others, broadened Celtic music from its traditional roots to the wider range of music now encompassed within the Celtic music genre. From slow airs and ballads to driving instrumentals, they wrote and performed a broad spectrum of Scottish folk music. Though the band split up in 2001, due to contractual recording obligations, they reunited briefly in 2004 to record a final album.

The band was introduced to a wider audience when they created the music for the BBC TV documentary series The Gamekeeper (1995). Five Hands High, one of their more notable albums, opened with "8-Step Waltz", in fact a reel. The band is best known for their album Demons and Lovers. They later added a drummer, Lee Agnew (also part of Dougie MacLean's band) to the band. In a further change, their 1999 tour included the accordion and keyboards of Brian McAlpine. Both had appeared on Demons and Lovers.

Their last album in 2004, The Wind Shall Blow For Ever More was seen as a return of the band to an earlier sound.

The band toured extensively, appearing at many festivals, such as Ely, Edinburgh, Tarbert and Arran. They headlined the 1994 "Celts in Kent" festival, playing two shows in Faversham and the Sassoon Gallery in Folkestone. In 1996 they headlined the Gosport Easter Festival, with their contemporaries the Old Blind Dogs sharing the stage for the finale.

== Band members ==
- Annie Grace: whistles, Great Highland bagpipe, Scottish smallpipes and vocals (also an actor with the National Theatre of Scotland)
- Ross Kennedy: guitars and vocals
- Gavin Marwick: fiddle (now with Ceilidh Minogue)
- Lynn Morrison: keyboards and vocals
- Rod Paul: mandolin, banjo, guitar
- Stevie Lawrence: percussion, guitars
- Lee Agnew: drums
- Brian McAlpine: keyboards, accordion
- Ashley MacMillan: drums
- Lawrie MacMillan: bass

== Discography ==
- The Iron Horse (1992)
- Thro Water, Earth and Stone (1993)
- Five Hands High (1994)
- Voice of the Land (1995)
- Demons and Lovers (1997)
- The Wind Shall Blow For Ever More (2004)
- The Collection (2009)

Additionally, they appear on:

- "Women of the World, Celtic II" (Putumayo 1995) with the song 'Raindance'
- The Rough Guide to Scottish Music (1996)
  - with the song "The 8-Step Waltz". A various artists album which also includes acts like Wolfstone.
- Naciones Celtas: Buscando el norte (1997)
  - with the song "Glasgow Peggy".
