= The Arms Dealer's Daughter =

Studio album by Shooglenifty
- Released: 10 June 2003
- Genre: Celtic
- Length: 57:46
- Label: Compass

Shooglenifty chronology
Solar Shears (2001)	The Arms Dealer's Daughter (2003)	Radical Mestizo (2005)

Professional ratings
Review scores
Source	Rating
Allmusic	3/5 stars

The Arms Dealer's Daughter, an album by Shooglenifty, was released in 2003 on the Compass Records label.

== Track listing ==
1. "Glenuig Hall/The Wrong Box" – 5:00
2. "The Arms Dealer's Daughter/Aye Right" – 6:52
3. "Heading West" – 5:10
4. "Missed the Bypass/The Reid St. Sofa/Fit're Ye Dain, Up Ma Vennel?!" – 5:22
5. "The Nordal Rumba" – 5:12
6. "Bar Bruno's/Maxine's Polka" – 4:33
7. "A Fistful of Euro/The New Rat, No. 6" – 6:23
8. "Carboni's Farewell/The Patient Man" – 7:02
9. "Scraping the Barrel/Fielding's Possum/Take the Tunnel" – 5:36
10. "Tune for Bartley" – 6:36

== Sources and links ==
- The Arms Dealer's Daughter at AllMusic
