= Radical Mestizo =

Live album by Shooglenifty
- Released: 28 June 2005
- Genre: Celtic
- Length: 59:50
- Label: Compass

Shooglenifty chronology
The Arms Dealer's Daughter (2003)	Radical Mestizo (2005)	Troots (2007)

Professional ratings
Review scores
Source	Rating
Allmusic	link

Radical Mestizo, a live album by Shooglenifty, was released in 2005 on the Compass Records label.

== Track listing ==
1. "She's in the Attic" – 5:51
2. "Glenuig Hall" – 4:46
3. "The Arms Dealer's Daughter" – 7:18
4. "Nordal Rumba" – 5:54
5. "Carboni's Farewell" – 6:56
6. "Delighted" – 6:01
7. "Schumann's Leap" – 4:11
8. "Heading West" – 5:15
9. "A Fistful of Euro" – 7:12
10. "Scraping the Barrel" – 6:26

== Sources and links ==
- Radical Mestizo at AllMusic
