= A Whisky Kiss =

Studio album by Shooglenifty
- Released: 2 July 1996
- Recorded: 1995–1996
- Studio: Castle Cava Studios
- Genres: Celtic fusion; Celtic rock; acid croft; acid ceilidh; worldbeat
- Length: 47:39
- Label: Greentrax
- Producer: Shooglenifty

Shooglenifty chronology
Venus in Tweeds (1994)	A Whisky Kiss (1996)	Live at Selwyn Hall (1996)

A Whisky Kiss is the second studio album by Scottish Celtic fusion band Shooglenifty. After releasing their first album Venus in Tweeds in 1994, the band toured, and then began work on A Whisky Kiss in late 1995. Some of the album's tracks were premiered in early 1996 ahead of its release. The album combines the band's Scottish Celtic music with genres such as worldbeat and techno. The band described the album as "acid croft", whilst one reviewer termed it a unique variation of Celtic rock.

The album was released in May 1996 by Greentrax Recordings, with critics praising its unique and innovative sound. It has since gone on to be regarded as a notable album. Nonetheless, the album was released to an "unsuspecting public" with minimal promotion, and as such, the band retained their loyal cult following. The band toured the album in 1996, leading to the live album Live at Selwyn Hall.

== Background ==
Shooglenifty formed in Edinburgh in 1990, and after spending some years touring and developing their Celtic fusion sound, they recorded and released their first album Venus in Tweeds in 1994. In 1995, they toured, where they performed songs from the album. One reviewer stated "they took Sidmouth by storm" despite "the strange lunch time sit down concert" that was booked. They began work on their second album in late 1995, while still touring. In early 1996, they performed at Gosport where they played some of the new material from the upcoming album. One reviewer said that "live they are loud, energetic and menacing. Angus, the fiddle player prowls around defying anyone to stand still, so much so that even I have been known to sway and shuffle a bit." The album was recorded at Castle Cava Studios and was completed in 1996, and the band titled it A Whisky Kiss.

== Music ==
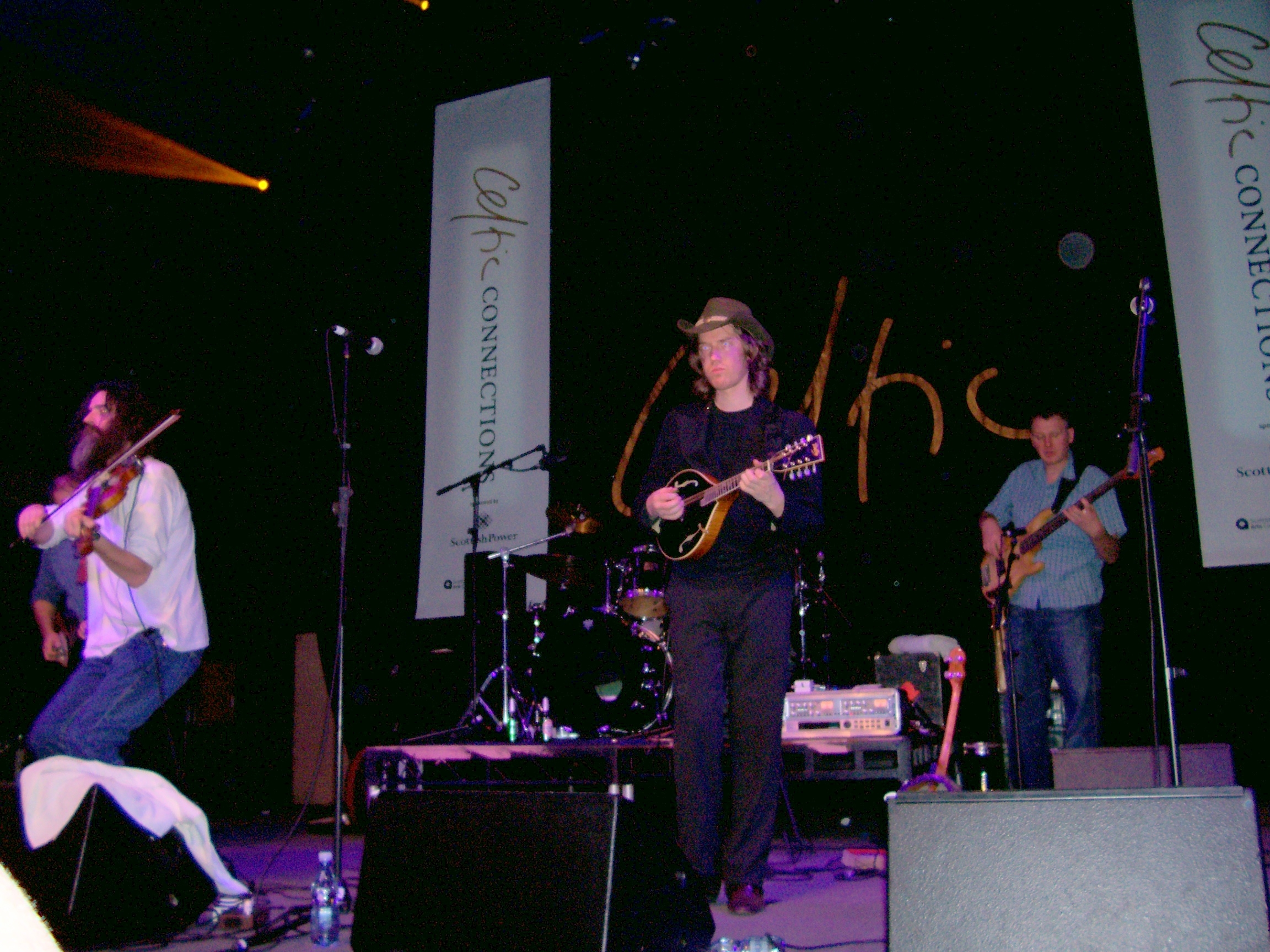
Shooglenifty playing live in 2007.

A Whisky Kiss is entirely instrumental album that combines Scottish folk underpinnings with techno and worldbeat music, and the end result was an album described as "akin to a modern musical jaunt around the world" that "further cemented the band’s reputation as wild crossover artists transcending categories and genres." Dave Sleger of Allmusic said that part of the band's, and the album's uniqueness lies in the fact that, "as a rock band, they've chosen to utilize their indigenous musical upbringing in a modern application. They do not limit themselves either." The band coined the genres "acid croft" and "acid ceilidh" to describe the music, whilst Worldbeat International said the album had "off-centre stylings". Dave Beeby said the album has a "tight album sound" and that the band "play the sort of tunes which at first sound vaguely familiar but you've been lulled into a false sense of security. A sound here, a strange sound there, a sequence played in an odd way all make you sit up and take notice." Most tracks are led by fiddle, mandolin or the banjax, an instrument which has been created by its player Garry, and behind, or sometimes in front of those components are driving bass and drums, with a touch of acoustic guitar thrown in for good measure. Beeby said that the music on the album "is based on the first album but has moved on a few steps. The tunes are mostly self-penned using a variety of rhythms and odd vocal effects creating something which is unique, a word too often used, but in this case meant."

"She's in the Attic/Hey Goat!" begins with a "strolling" surf guitar tease and abruptly breaks into a "lively" fiddle tune courtesy of Angus Grant with subtle Eastern undertones creeping in and out. "Song for Susie" was described by Sleger as a rare example of a "groove-heavy banjo song." Written by the band's picker Garry Finlayson, he and Iain McLeod comprise the band's uncommon duo-banjo "attack", as exemplified in the track. The title track features an "unrelenting" and "pulsating" rhythm and a catchy, repetitive melody, and was described by Sleger as dance music, saying "although an unlikely club hit, the title track fulfills many requirements of that distant genre."

== Release and reception ==
Professional ratings
Review scores
Source	Rating
Allmusic	3/5 stars
Ambience	(favourable)
The Living Tradition	(favourable)

A Whisky Kiss was released on 2 July 1996 by Greentrax Recordings. It was originally intended to be released in time for the short English tour they had undertaken earlier in the year, but the album was delayed for unspecified reasons. Despite positive reviews, the record was not a commercial success due to a lack of radio or television play, and as such, the band retained their cult following; Whitham said that the album was released "to an unsuspecting public, who wasted no time warming to their particular brand of 'acid ceilidh'. In doing so they became instant hits in just about every village hall across the land. Sadly this groundbreaking album suffered from a lack of mainstream radio airplay and television interest, as is often the case. Subsequently our beloved hero's are only household names in those homes frequented by their family, friends, and a loyal cult following."

The album demonstrates a unique, innovative sound that was described by some as "groundbreaking". Dave Beeby of The Living Tradition said the album was "essential, it's innovative, and, along with the new Dick Gaughan [album], one of the most important to come out of Scotland this year. Even more importantly it's brilliant". He further commented it was "quite simply stunning" and called it "unique, a word too often used, but in this case meant." Dave Sleger of Allmusic rated the album three stars out of five and said "A Whiskey Kiss will probably appeal less to folk purists than to those who welcome a little spice and variety injected into their rock & roll." He praised the band's uniqueness and the album's lack of lyrics, which he feared could have "brought the album down" had they appeared. Ambience said that "with their wild ceilidh type music played on fiddle, banjo, guitar, drums and percussion, Shooglenifty have become a force to be reckoned with and their brilliance shows no sign of abating." The album has continued to be highly praised in later times; Keith Whitham of The Living Tradition referred to it as a "groundbreaking album".

The duo toured the album throughout 1996, and their performance at Selwyn Hall, Box, Wiltshire was released as Live at Selwyn Hall in November 1996. The band's drummer James Mackintosh recalled that the band's performance at the town hall of Stornoway during the HebCelt festival shortly after the release of A Whisky Kiss was unique, saying "this was long before the [festival's] big tent, and the venue seemed strangely deserted when the time came to play. But the caretaker assured us that as soon as we started the crowd would arrive, as they were nearby ... in the pub. Sure enough, by the end of the first number, the hall was packed; a messenger had sent the word." On 25 April 2015, the title track was somewhat popularized after it was played on The John Toal Show on BBC Radio Ulster. In a 2015 interview, the band's percussionist James Mackintosh said that "Farewell to Nigg" was his favourite Shooglenifty tune, whilst their mandolin player Ewan MacPherson said that "Da Eye Wifey" was one of his favourite Shooglenifty tunes as he "loves playing it".

== Track listing ==
No.	Title	Length
1.	"Da Eye Wifey: Woods No. 1"	7:46
2.	"She's in the Attic: She's in the Attic/Hey Goat"	5:45
3.	"A Song for Susie"	4:41
4.	"A Whisky Kiss"	6:05
5.	"Good Drying: Flick It up and Catch It/The Creepy Zone/Good Drying"	5:33
6.	"Hoptsoi"	8:06
7.	"The Price of a Pig: The Price of a Pig/Crabbit Shona/Bancroft's Descent"	5:41
8.	"Farewell to Nigg"	5:10
Total length:		47:39

== Charts ==
Chart performance for A Whisky Kiss
Chart (1997)	Peak position
Australian Albums (ARIA)	94
