= Talitha MacKenzie =

- Also known as: Talitha Nelson
- Born: Long Island, New York, United States
- Genres: Celtic, Early Music & Historical Dance
- Occupations: Vocalist, Instructor, Historical Dancer
- Instruments: Piano, Clàrsach
- Website: www.talithamackenzie.com

Talitha MacKenzie (born on Long Island, New York) is a Scottish-American world music recording artist, and historical dance and music teacher and performer. Initially known as a vocalist in the original duo Mouth Music, she has maintained a solo career. Although most associated with Celtic and Gaelic music, she performs a wide range of early music and dance, as well as her own compositions.

== Formative years ==
=== Musical and cultural training ===
From an early age, MacKenzie took advantage of growing up in a multi-cultural New York environment. Training as a concert pianist from the age of four (teaching by the age of thirteen, and later specialising in Slavic and Impressionist piano music), she also began to teach herself Scottish Gaelic in her teens. Studying French, Russian and Spanish in high school, she went on to study Russian at Connecticut College.

Following her time at Connecticut College, MacKenzie worked at the Manhattan record store World Tone Music, where she immersed herself in the "exotic modes and unusual rhythms" of folk dance from around the world. This led to work with various dance ensembles in the fields of Balkan, Celtic, Renaissance and Baroque music. At around the same time, MacKenzie worked at maritime museums in Mystic, Ct and South Street, Manhattan, which led to her crewing on sailing ships. She became known as a singer of sea shanties and other work songs, gaining insights regarding the interrelation of movement/work-related music and its organic rhythms.

Extending her formal musical studies, MacKenzie attended the New England Conservatory of Music, obtaining a degree in ethnomusicology and music history. While studying at the NEC, she also led the institution's Eastern European Music Ensemble and sang in the Conservatory Choir (performing with the Boston Symphony Orchestra and Boston Pops).

=== First traditional music recordings ===
Following her conservatory studies, MacKenzie was, for a short while, a member of the Boston-Irish band St James Gate (vocals, concertina, whistle), featuring on their eponymous album in 1985. She also spent several years touring America as a solo artist and performing puirt a beul with a local Scottish traditional dance band.

In 1986 MacKenzie released her first solo album - Shantyman! – under the name Talitha Nelson. This album of original maritime songs from around the world featured contributions from Anne Goodwin and Tony Morris.

== Mouth Music (1988–1991) ==
Having visited Scotland several times previously to study and make field recordings, MacKenzie left the United States and settled in Edinburgh in 1987. She joined the Scottish folk ensemble Drumalban, led by James MacDonald Reid; also in the group was piper and violin virtuoso Martyn Bennett. While performing at a concert in a village hall in South Uist, MacKenzie was spotted by Martin Swan, an English-born musician and television producer of Scots descent who was filming in the area.

The following year, Swan and MacKenzie joined forces as Mouth Music (Scots for puirt a beul, literally, 'instrumental music from the mouth'), drawing on MacKenzie's repertoire of traditional Gaelic songs, including waulking songs, laments and reels. The resulting recordings blended Gaelic word rhythms with electric and acoustic instrumentation (including fiddles and sparse electric guitars), computer samples and a variety of other electronic beats (including hip-hop). MacKenzie sang and handled vocal arrangements, while Swan played the majority of instruments (acoustic, electric and electronic) with further contributions from Martyn Bennett on pipes and fiddle.

The duo's debut album Mouth Music reached number one on the Billboard Top World Music Albums chart as well as topping the Music Week chart. The album also picked up a broad set of poll wins and industry recommendations including listings in Folk Roots magazine’s 'Albums Of the Year', Q’s 'Recommended Releases of 1990', The Guardian’s 'Pick Of The Year' and CMJ’s 'Best Of 1991 (USA)', and was later dubbed as an early Afro-Celtic music project, anticipating the later work of projects like the Afro-Celt Sound System. Q Magazine called it the album "surely the most innovative worldly sound of 1990" and Entertainment Weekly referred to it as a “magical treat [which] is a reminder that world music means more than just African or Brazilian exotica. It's any style that takes its soul from a particular tradition and its brains from more global sensibilities — it's the sound of many cultures chatting to each other... The sources are treated with muscle as well as respect... Mouth Music's combination of intelligence, beauty, and nerve has the power to unite both world-beatniks and mainstream rock fans in mutual exhilaration.”

Mouth Music ran into problems in 1991 and MacKenzie and Swan parted company. Swan continued recording as "Mouth Music" and MacKenzie toured internationally under her own name, leading workshops in Mouth Music for Dancing. She considers her subsequent solo albums, Sòlas and Spiorad, to be a truer continuation of the Mouth Music project and showcases her recordings from all three of her Gaelic albums on a MySpace site dedicated to the genre Mouth Music ("not a band...it's a genre and a way of performing music.").

== Work with Sedenka ==
In September 1992, MacKenzie set up the a cappella women's group Sedenka. The name comes from a Bulgarian word meaning 'a gathering of women for the purpose of enjoying each other's company while working through the long winter nights' and its purpose was to gather and share songs and dances from around the world in a variety of styles and languages.

Sedenka have performed at many Scottish festivals, events and fundraisers (including the Edinburgh Peace Festival) as well as other events including the 2003 International Festival of the Sea and the Thames Festival Sing For Water events in London between 2002 and 2004.

== Solo career ==
In 1993, MacKenzie released her second solo album Sòlas (Solace) on Riverboat Records, working with producer-arrangers Iain McKinna and Chris Birkett. Containing a mixture of traditional and original Gaelic songs, it included contributions from Sedenka (on the tracks "E hó hì" and "Rol hol ill leò") and performed well in the World Music charts.

In 1995, MacKenzie took on a role in the Gaelic play Réiteach and toured with the production throughout Scotland.

Signing a new deal with Shanachie Entertainment Corporation later in 1995, MacKenzie recorded her third solo album Spiorad (Spirit) in France with Chris Birkett producing and co-arranging once again. Another album of both traditional and original music, Spiorad included Celtic and Slavic music and was released in 1996.

In 2004, MacKenzie flew to Hollywood to sing with Dessislava Stefanova and the Bulgarian Women's Choir on the soundtrack of the film Troy. She used the proceeds to set up her own record label, Sonas Multimedia, in order to release her music in both CD and digital download format. This also cemented her ongoing production alliance with Chris Birkett and Mick Glossop.

In 2007, MacKenzie began to release digital download-only singles via Sonas Multimedia. The first of these was "Wind Chases The Sun" (released February 10, 2007), which was an original MacKenzie country ballad dealing with the plight of Native-American political prisoner Leonard Peltier.

Two more download singles were made available on March 25, 2007. "Family Tree" (described as a pop single) was another MacKenzie song written as a musical conversation between a father and daughter as they prepared for a summer vacation of research into the family roots. "Amazing Grace" was a more traditional work – a MacKenzie vocal arrangement of the popular hymn, which also featured Rhiannon Giddens (soprano), Miriam Stockley (alto) and Michael Laffan (bass). On April 5, 2007, MacKenzie released a third download single - "Unelanvhi Uwetsi" - another version of "Amazing Grace" recorded by the same lineup as the previous one, but this time with words from the Cherokee hymn written by Reverend Samuel Worcester and Elias Boudinot.

On April 26, 2007, MacKenzie released another download single, "Indian Summer" - a fusion of ragtime and old-timey music incorporating elements of country swing, it was an original MacKenzie song recalling her annual pilgrimage to visit her grandparents in the family heartland in West Virginia, celebrating the past and the present. The next day (on April 27, 2007), she released a fifth download single, "Wheeling Island Girls", another original Old Timey song based on family reminiscences of West Virginian life at the time of the Great Spring Flood of March 1936.

On July 22, 2007, MacKenzie released her fourth album Indian Summer, which celebrated the connection between Celtic and American cultures and explored her own roots on both sides of the Atlantic. It combined her own compositions with traditional songs in a variety of mainstream genres, in English, Scottish Gaelic and a number of Native-American languages, drawing on folk-rock, Americana and Native-American music along the way. Rhiannon Giddens (from the African-American jug band Carolina Chocolate Drops) contributed fiddle, banjo, "flat-footin'" dancing and additional vocals to many tracks. The album contained four of the five download singles released so far (with the exception of "Amazing Grace").

The Daily Telegraph hailed Indian Summer as a "remarkable record (which) packs boundless range, and writing and performance skills to match the scholarly clout" while the BBC's Frank Hennessey hailed MacKenzie as "one of the great voices of the world... an extraordinary artist" during a broadcast of the "Celtic Heartbeat" programme on BBC Radio Wales. Irish Music Magazine also praised the album, saying "the performances are faultless. (MacKenzie) is blessed with a glorious singing voice that's warm and expressive."

MacKenzie is currently teaching at the Royal Conservatoire of Scotland (RCS) and Edinburgh Napier University and is looking forward to further recording projects, including a World Music album Global Sequence and a collection of Batonebi (Georgian Healing) Songs. She recently was invited to perform as a soloist with the Jubilant Community Choir at the Thames Pageant for the Queen's Diamond Jubilee on June 3, 2012. To coincide with this, she is re-releasing her album Spiorad (spirit), with a newly recorded track "Spiorad Iain", dedicated to her late husband.

== Discography ==
=== Albums ===
- Shantyman! (1986, Islander Records)
- Sòlas (1993, Riverboat Records)
- Spiorad (1996, Shanachie Entertainment Corporation)
- Indian Summer (2007, Sonas Multimedia)
- Global Sequence (forthcoming, Sonas Multimedia)

=== Singles ===
- "Wind Chases The Sun" (2007, Sonas Multimedia)
- "Family Tree" (2007, Sonas Multimedia)
- "Amazing Grace" (2007, Sonas Multimedia)
- "Unelanvhi Uwetsi" (2007, Sonas Multimedia)
- "Indian Summer" (2007, Sonas Multimedia)
- "Wheeling Island Girls" (2007, Sonas Multimedia)

=== With Mouth Music ===
- Mouth Music (1990, Triple Earth/Rykodisc)

=== With St James Gate ===
- St James Gate (1985, Kells Records)

=== Contributing artist ===
- The Rough Guide to World Music (1994, World Music Network)
- The Rough Guide to Scottish Music (1996, World Music Network)
- Troy: Music From The Motion Picture (2004, Reprise/WEA)

== See also ==
- Fear a' bhàta
