= The Clutha =

The Clutha were a traditional Scottish band hailing from Glasgow, that released a small number of albums in the 1970s. The line-up on the Clutha's first album, Scotia (1971), was John Eaglesham (vocal, concertina), Erlend Voy (fiddle, concertina, vocals), Calum Allan (fiddle), Ronnie Alexander (vocals, guitar) and Gordeanna McCulloch (vocals). The same band members are credited on their 1974 album, Scots Ballads Songs & Dance Tunes. By the time of their 1977 release, The Bonnie Mill Dams, Jimmy Anderson had joined the group on chamber pipes and bagpipes, and Eaglesham had left the group. The name "Clutha" was recently revived in the form of the Glasgow psychedelic alternative rock band, "Clutha" (also sometimes referred to as Clutha Dogthing)

== History ==
In 1957, Norman Buchan was a teacher at Rutherglen Academy. He formed a Ballads Club. Among the pupils who joined up were Gordeanna McCulloch. She fell in love with singing, and travelled to London to attend one of Ewan MacColl's weekend seminars at his home in Beckenham, Kent. She sang briefly with the Clydesiders a group formed at school, and in 1964 joined The Clutha. The name is the Latin word for the Clyde. The band played traditional Scottish tunes and sang songs in Scots.

=== The Small Pipes ===
When The Clutha added Jimmy Anderson on the lowland pipes on "Bonnie Mill Dams" (1977) they were pioneers, in that the instrument had rarely been heard for 100 years, and not previously recorded. They won the Peter Cooke Cup for Scots ceilidh bands in 1971, 1972 and 1973. Although they did not record again until 2001, they have continued to host ceilidh dances. In 2001, The Clutha released an album entitled On the Braes, with Ronnie Alexander (vocals, guitar), Erlend Voy (fiddle, concertina, vocals), Callum Allan (fiddle), Gordeanna McCulloch (vocals) and Tom Johnstone (pipes).

=== McCulloch solo ===
In 1965, McCulloch appeared on a compilation album on Topic Records. In 1978 she released her own solo album, Sheath and Knife, on which she unearthed obscure Scottish songs. Since then she has appeared on six compilation albums and recorded another solo album. To cover McCulloch's absence during a Brittany tour by the band, they temporarily recruited Heather Heywood to stand in as a vocals singer.

McCulloch died in 2019.

=== Norman Buchan MP ===
Buchan became a Labour Member of Parliament and was the organiser of the Edinburgh Folk Festival for several years.

== Discography ==
The Clutha

- Scotia! (1971, Argo ZFB18 stereo)
- The Streets of Glasgow (1973, Topic 12TS226 stereo compilation album with other Glaswegian traditional musicians)
- Scots Ballads Songs & Dance Tunes (1974, Topic 12TS242 stereo)
- The Bonnie Mill Dams (1977, 12TS330 stereo)
- On The Braes (2001)
- Live from Harvard (2019 release of a 2018 performance)

Gordeanna McCulloch

- New Voices From Scotland (1965, 12T133)
- Sheath and Knife (1978, Topic 12TS370, accompanied by the Clutha)
- In Freenship's Name (1999)

For more on the discography, see.
