= Catherine-Ann MacPhee =

Scottish Gaelic singer (born 1959)

Catherine-Ann MacPhee (Cathy-Ann MacPhee; Scottish Gaelic: Catriona-Anna Nic a' Phi; born 1959) is a Scottish Gaelic singer from Barra in the Hebrides, now resident in Canada. She has worked in the theatre and broadcasting as well as giving musical performances in Scotland, England, Canada and elsewhere. After a period living in Ottawa she moved to Halifax, Nova Scotia, in 2017.

== Acting career ==
Catherine-Ann was born on 21 November 1959 in the Island of Barra, Scotland where she grew up with Scottish Gaelic as her first language. Electricity did not reach the island until she was six. At the age of five she started singing at candle-lit ceilidhs in the little village of Eoligarry. During the summer she sang for tourists. At the age of seventeen she joined "Fir Chlis" (Northern Lights). It was the first Scottish Gaelic repertory theatre company and did work for radio and television including the 1979 BBC Scotland Gaelic language course Can Seo. Following budget cuts the company ended after three years. She moved to the Isle of Mull, where she worked in a bar in Tobermory, but soon joined John McGrath's English-speaking 7:84 theatre company. She traveled with them to Leningrad, Tbilisi, Toronto, Cape Breton and Berlin.

== The first Gaelic albums ==
Ian Green from Greentrax Records heard her at a festival in Dingwall and offered a recording contract. Like her subsequent albums, all of the songs on Cànan Nan Gaidheal (The Language of the Gael) (1987) are in Gaelic, and most are traditional. One of the songs is by the Gaelic-speaking folk-rock group Runrig. The backing musicians include Tony Cuffe and William Jackson, both from the group Ossian.

Her second album, which is called Chi mi 'n Geamhradh after the first song, written by Calum and Rory MacDonald of Runrig, contains mostly traditional songs, though it has been described as "containing a bewildering range ^{[in whose opinion?]} of pop and New Age influences including drum machine, harp and bass guitar". It was probably the first time that "waulking songs" (work songs for women finishing tweed cloth) were treated this way.

The Mrs Ackyroyd Band is a loose association of singers who record perform comic parodies of folk music. In 1987 they undertook their only non-comic project, a song-cycle called The Stones of Callanish. MacPhee sang two of the songs on it.

== Màiri Mhór (1821–1898) ==
The Highland Land League was an organisation devoted to resisting the Highland Clearances in the mid to late nineteenth century. Many songs were written by Màiri Mhór (Mary MacPherson) from Skye in support of their cause. In 1993 a biographical BBC TV film about Màiri Mhór was made in which Alyxis Daly played Màiri Mhór and MacPhee sang the soundtrack. In the following year the soundtrack album was released. Some of these Gaelic songs are about the landscape of the highlands and represent a farewell to a way of life. In 1997 she recorded a live album at the 50th anniversary of the Edinburgh Festival.

== Discography ==
Albums

- Cànan nan Gàidheal (The Language of the Gael) (1987)
- Chi mi 'n Geamhradh (I See Winter) (1991)
- Sings Màiri Mhòr (1994)
- Òrain nan Gàidheal (1997)
- Sùil air Ais (Looking Back) (2004)

Contributing artist

- The Rough Guide to Scottish Music (1996)

Film

- Màiri Mhòr: Her Life and Songs (1993)
