= Venus in Tweeds =

Studio album by Shooglenifty
- Released: 1994
- Genre: Celtic fusion
- Length: 46:03
- Label: Greentrax

Shooglenifty chronology
Venus in Tweeds (1994)	Whisky Kiss (1996)

Professional ratings
Review scores
Source	Rating
Allmusic	3/5 stars

Venus in Tweeds, an album by Shooglenifty, was released in 1995 on the Greentrax Recordings label.

== Track listing ==
1. "The Pipe Tunes: John McKenzie's Fancy/The Kitchen Piper" – 4:55
2. "Horace: The Grampian Television Jig/Horace Show of Highfield/The Old Woman's Dance" – 5:05
3. "The Point Road" – 3:15
4. "Venus in Tweeds" – 4:04
5. "Waiting for Conrad" – 5:42
6. "Two Fifty to Vigo" – 4:52
7. "Paranoia: Paranoia/Flapper's Reel" – 5:49
8. "Buying a Blanket: Buying a Blanket/Murphy the Mousecatcher" – 4:24
9. "The Tammienorrie: The Tammienorie/Leo Elsey's Reel/Les Reel des Voyageurs" – 5:17
10. "The Point Road – Joiner's Mix" – 3:25
