= Helicopter Girl =

Scottish musician

- Born: Jacqueline Margaret Joyce; 1969 (age 56–57); St Andrews, Fife, Scotland
- Origin: Perth, Scotland
- Genres: Soul; jazz; funk; folk; trip hop; synth-pop; house
- Occupations: Singer-songwriter; arranger-producer
- Instrument: Vocals
- Years active: 1993–present
- Labels: Instant Karma; Dharma

Helicopter Girl (born 15 August 1963) is the stage name of Jacqueline Margaret "Jackie" Joyce, a musician from Perth, Scotland. She was born to a Scottish mother and Ghanaian father. She was previously a member of the groups Mouth Music and Ambisonic.

== Music career ==
Her first album was 2000's How to Steal the World, which was nominated for a Mercury Prize. Also, in 2001, she appeared on the Rod Stewart album, Human, performing with him on the track "Don't Come Around Here."

Joyce then took an extended break from the business before writing and recording her second album, Voodoo Chic, which featured the single "Angel City," and was released in 2004. The album Metropolitan was released in June 2008. It was preceded by the single "It Doesn't Get Much Better Than This".

Helicopter Girl's fourth album, Wanda Meant, was self-released on 1 April 2015.

A track in the album Ecohero by Ambisonic, a band she was a member of in 1997, featured a song called "Helicopter Kinda Girl" which is where she got her stage name from.

== Discography ==
=== Albums ===
- How to Steal the World (Instant Karma Records, 2000)
- Voodoo Chic (Dharma Records, 2004; (released in 2005 in the United States on Robbins Entertainment)
- Metropolitan (Dharma Records, 2008)
- Wanda Meant (Helicopter Girl Music, 2015)

=== Singles ===
- "345 Wonderful" (2000)
- "Subliminal Punk" (2001)
- "Glove Compartment" (2001)
- "Angel City" (2004) #82 UK
- "White Revolving Circles" (2004)
- "Umbrellas in the Rain" (2005)
- "It Doesn't Get Much Better Than This" (2008)
- "Ballerina" (2008)
- "It's Coming Up" (2015)
