= Heather Heywood =

- Born: Heather Williamson; 26 December 1950 (age 75); Kilmarnock, Ayrshire, Scotland
- Genre: Folk
- Years active: 1968-present
- Label: Greentrax

Heather Heywood (born Heather Williamson on 26 December 1950), is a Scottish folk singer from Kilmarnock, Ayrshire. She was voted "Artist of the Year" by Glasgow's Star Club in 1993.

== Career ==
Heywood's first performance took place around 1968 in the Eglinton Folk Club in Irvine, Scotland. Inspired by Martin Carthy, Lizzie Higgins and Jeannie Robertson among others, she progressed to bookings as a solo artist for a number of Scottish clubs. She remained a solo artist for most of her career except for one tour of Brittany with the band The Clutha during the absence of their singer Gordeanna McCulloch.

Heather Heywood is best known for ballads and is quoted to be "not so taken with lighter numbers."

== Personal life ==
In 1970, Williamson married Peter Heywood, a folk music activist and publisher of The Living Tradition magazine. They have three daughters. Her three daughters are Fiona, Susie and Kathryn. Heather has 4 grandchildren - Mikey, Ray, Hope and Louisa ඩා.

== Discography ==
- Some Kind of Love (1987)
- By Yon Castle Wa' (1993)
- Lassies Fair and Laddies Braw (2011)
