= Ishbel MacAskill =

Scottish singer and heritage activist

Isabella Margaret MacAskill (née MacIver, 14 March 1941 – 31 March 2011) was a heritage activist and traditional Scottish Gaelic singer and teacher, often referred to as the "Gaelic diva".

== Early life ==
She was born in Loanhead, near Edinburgh on 14 March 1941, and adopted by the weaver and Royal Naval Reserve seaman Allan MacIver and his wife Christina MacIver; both were natives of Broker, Isle of Lewis. When she was 12, she moved with her family to Stornoway, the Island's capital, where she attended the Nicolson Institute.

She moved to Glasgow for secretarial studies at Stow College and worked for British Rail before marrying Bill MacAskill, a native of Lochinver, Sutherland, in 1964. For the following 15 years she concentrated on raising their four children.

== Career ==
It was not until the age of 38 that MacAskill first sang in public, at a fringe event at the 1979 National Mòd. Musician and producer Noel Eadie heard her perform, which led to the first of her several albums. With the encouragement of her husband, before long she was appearing in concerts and festivals worldwide, and became a regular at the Celtic Connections festival in Glasgow and the Celtic Colours Festival in Cape Breton Island.

In 1999 she featured as a guest artist on Transatlantic Sessions 2. In 2003 she represented Scotland at the Smithsonian Folklife Festival in Washington, D.C., and appeared at the World Festival of Island Cultures in South Korea. In May and June 2006, she toured Australia leading workshops and concerts in Gaelic song in part as the guest of the Australian Gaelic Singers leading a Gaelic Song Masterclass and two concerts in Sydney.

=== Television ===
She appeared on the Transatlantic Sessions television series, and also played the part of the shop assistant Nora in the popular 1990s Gaelic language soap opera Machair on Scottish Television.

== Death ==
She died on 31 March 2011, aged 70, after a fall in the kitchen of her home in Inverness. A memorial concert was held in Inverness on 16 June 2011. Her husband Bill MacAskill died, aged 81, on 31 October 2011, 7 months to the day after Ishbel.

== Solo discography ==
- Essentially Ishbel (2000)

Track Listing:

1. "An Teid thu Leam a Mhairi (Will you go with me Mary?)"
2. "An Innis Aigh (The Happy Isle)"
3. "Waulking Set"
4. "Canan nan Gaidheal (The Language of the Gael)"
5. "Piobaireachd Dhomhnuill Dhuibh (Pibroch of Black Donald)"
6. "Soraidh Leis an Ait (Farewell to the place where I was raised)"
7. "An Ataireachd Ard. (The Eternal Surge of the Sea)"
8. "Mor a'Cheannaich"
9. "Bidh Clann Ulaidh air do Bhanais (The Clan of Ulster will be at your Wedding)"
10. "Fair and Tender Ladies"
11. "Griogal Cridhe(darling Gregor)"
12. "Puirt a Beul (Mouth Music)"
13. "Nighean nan Geug (Rarest of Maidens)"
