= Shooglenifty =

Scottish Celtic fusion band

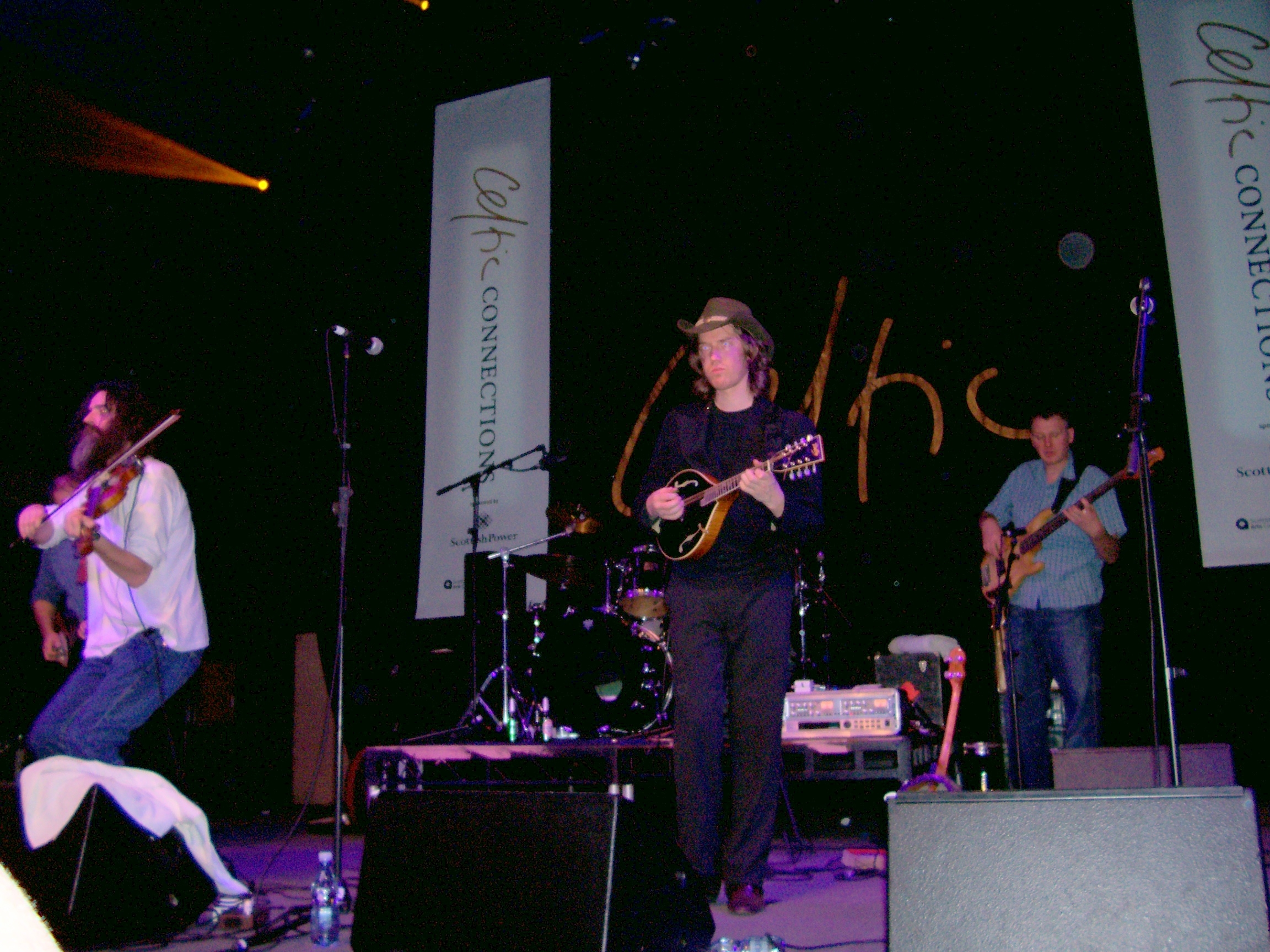
- Shooglenifty performing at Celtic Connections in 2007

Background information
- Origin: Edinburgh, Scotland
- Genres: Celtic fusion, folk rock, acid croft
- Years active: 1990–present
- Labels: Greentrax, Womad, Compass, Shoogle Records
- Members: Malcolm Crosbie; Euan McLaughlin; James Mackintosh; Ciaran Ryan; Eilidh Shaw
- Past members: Angus R. Grant (deceased); Luke Plumb; Iain MacLeod; Conrad Ivitsky; Garry Finlayson; Ewan MacPherson; Quee MacArthur
- Website: Official website

Shooglenifty are a Scottish Celtic fusion band that tours internationally. The band blends Scottish traditional music with influences ranging from electronica to alternative rock.

Shooglenifty have performed in countries including Australia, Austria, Cuba, Belgium, France, Norway, Ireland, Italy, Denmark, New Zealand, Indonesia, South Africa, Lebanon, Spain, the US, Canada, Malaysia, Singapore, Japan, India, Germany, Sweden, the Netherlands, Russia, Luxembourg, Hungary, the Czech Republic, Slovakia, Slovenia, Poland, Switzerland, Portugal, Mexico and the UK. They have also performed for a number of notable fans, including Charles III, Tony Blair, Nelson Mandela, and Emperor Akihito of Japan.

As one of the first Celtic fusion acts to achieve widespread success, the band has achieved cult status within the Scottish trad scene, influencing acts like Elephant Sessions and The Peatbog Faeries.

== History ==
=== 1990–1994: Formation and first album ===
Shooglenifty formed in Edinburgh in 1990, its original lineup comprising trad musicians from Edinburgh, the Scottish Highlands, and Orkney. Several of the band members had previously played together in Swamptrash, a short-lived psychobilly group formed in 1987, also in Edinburgh.

Like other emerging trad acts at the time, including Celtic fusion pioneer Martyn Bennett, Shooglenifty sought to fuse "traditional-sounding melodies with the beats and basslines of more contemporary influences" in a style that the band dubbed "acid croft".

Shooglenifty's first gig was at La Belle Angele, a nightclub on Edinburgh's Cowgate, and was attended by only six people. After a few months of gigging, however, the band had built a dedicated audience through word of mouth, forcing them to use a PA system in subsequent performances.

The band signed with Scottish indie label Greentrax Recordings to produce their first studio album, Venus in Tweeds. Founding member Garry Finlayson credited the album as essential to consolidating the band's sound. Since its release in 1994, it has remained Shooglenifty's best-selling album.

=== 1995–2001: International tours and new line-up ===
In 1995, Shooglenifty headlined at the Shetland Folk Festival. The following year, they released their second album with Greentrax, A Whisky Kiss, and performed a notable concert at the Sydney Opera House which ended in an audience stage invasion. They also contributed instrumentation to Afro Celt Sound System's debut album Volume 1: Sound Magic.

In 1997, the band performed at a concert in Tokyo attended by both Emperor Akihito of Japan and newly-elected UK Prime Minister Tony Blair. Without the band's forewarning, Tony Blair joined them on the stage.

Three years later, the band made history as the first UK musical act to perform in Cuba since the 1958 Revolution, one year prior to the Manic Street Preachers.

Shooglenifty released their third studio album, Solar Shears, in 2001, through Glasgow-based indie label Vertical Records. In the same year, the band's mandolinist, Iain McLeod, and bass guitarist, Conrad Ivitsky, left the band, citing "mounting interpersonal tensions". Ivitsky was quickly replaced by Quee MacArthur, a "stalwart of Edinburgh's close-knit roots scene", while McLeod was replaced by Luke Plumb, a busker from Tasmania.

=== 2002–2015: Five studio albums ===
Leaving Vertical Records after only one album, Shooglenifty formed their own Edinburgh-based label, Shoogle Records. From 2003 to 2015, they released five studio albums through Shoogle, starting with The Arms Dealer's Daughter in 2003. This was followed by Radical Mestizo (2004), Troots (2007), Murmichan (2009), and The Untied Knot (2015).

In 2009, Shooglenifty returned to the Shetland Folk Festival to headline once again. In 2011 and again in 2013, they played at Glastonbury Festival.

=== 2016–Present: Death of Grant and reformation ===
Angus R. Grant, Shooglenifty's fiddler and founding frontman, died in October 2016 at the age 49. The band performed a tribute gig to Grant in January 2017, with the concert winning Event of the Year at the subsequent 2017 Scottish Traditional Music Awards. In 2018, Eilidh Shaw of The Poozies joined the band on fiddle, replacing Grant.

Following the departures of Luke Plumb and Quee MacArthur, Ciarán Ryan and Euan McLaughlin (of Skye-based electronic group Valtos) stepped in to play mandolin and bass guitar respectively.

With their new line-up, Shooglenifty recorded and released their eighth and ninth studio albums, Written in Water (2018) and Acid Croft, Vol. 9 (2020).

In 2024, after 34 years with the band, founding member Garry Finlayson left due to declining health.

Since 2022, the band has embarked on two tours of Canada and one tour of Scotland, and has appeared at festivals across the Europe. They are in the process of recording their tenth studio album, as yet untitled.

== Band members ==
Current members
- Eilidh Shaw – fiddle
- James Mackintosh – drums, drum machines, and darabuka
- Ciarán Ryan – banjo and mandolin
- Malcolm Crosbie – acoustic guitar and electric guitar
- Kaela Rowan – vocals
- Euan McLaughlin – bass guitar

Former members
- Angus R. Grant (deceased) – fiddle
- Iain McLeod – mandolin
- Conrad Ivitsky – bass
- Luke Plumb – mandolin
- Ewan MacPherson – mandolin and tenor banjo
- Quee MacArthur – bass and percussion
- Garry Finlayson – banjo and banjax

== Discography ==
Studio albums

- Venus in Tweeds (1994)
- A Whisky Kiss (1996)
- Solar Shears (2001)
- The Arms Dealer's Daughter (2003)
- Radical Mestizo (2004)
- Troots (2007)
- Murmichan (2009)
- The Untied Knot (2015)
- Written in Water (2018)
- Acid Croft, Vol. 9 (2020)
