= Burning Horizons =

EP by Wolfstone
- Released: 1993
- Recorded: Palladium Studios, Edinburgh, Scotland
- Genre: Celtic rock
- Length: 12:40
- Label: Iona
- Producer: Phil Cunningham

Wolfstone chronology
The Chase (1992)	Burning Horizons (1993)	Year of the Dog (1994)

Burning Horizons is a 1993 EP by Scottish Celtic rock band Wolfstone.

The second track, "Battle", is one of the band's better known performances, awarding itself as the first track on Pick of the Litter, the band's 1997 "best-of" album. It is also on The Best...Scottish Album in the World...Ever!, which entered the UK compilations chart at no. 9 the same year. An earlier version of the song was on the band's album Wolfstone II.

== Track listing ==
1. "Burning Horizons" - 5:22
2. "Battle" - 3:36
  - The Battle of the Somme
  - The Bugle Horn
  - The Atholl Highlanders
3. "The Prophet" - 3:44

== Personnel ==
- Duncan Chisholm: fiddle
- Stuart Eaglesham: vocals, acoustic guitar, electric guitar
- Struan Eaglesham: keyboards
- Ivan Drever: vocals, acoustic guitar, bouzouki
- Wayne Mackenzie: bass guitar
- Mop Youngson: drums
- Dougie Pincock: pipes
- Andy Murray, electric guitar
