= Seven (Wolfstone album) =

Studio album by Wolfstone
- Released: 18 May 1999
- Recorded: December 1998 – January 1999, Scotland
- Genres: Celtic rock; rock and reel
- Length: 47:07
- Label: Green Linnet Records
- Producers: Wolfstone; Rob Rankin

Wolfstone chronology
The Half Tail (1996)	Seven (1999)	Almost an Island (2002)

Seven is the fifth studio album by the Scottish Celtic rock band Wolfstone. After the release of the band's previous album The Half Tail in 1996, numerous members left the band, and due to poor management, the band "split up" in 1998 after the band's label Green Linnet Records released an unrelated side-project as the Wolfstone album This Strange Place in early 1998. However, still contractually obliged to record another album for Green Linnet Records, the remaining members of the band regrouped chose to write and record the required album with full attention, rather than make a "half-hearted" album. Bassist Wayne Mackenzie said "we could have just gone through the motions and made a half-hearted attempt at an album, but we didn’t. The band and our fans mean far too much to us to do that." Titling the album Seven after where the album sits in the band's canonical album sequence, the album style was described as a particularly rock-edged variation of Celtic rock, although it does feature some mellower tracks. The album contains a mix between songs and instrumentals and diverse subject matter.

The band recorded the album with new drummer Tony Soave and co-producer Rob Rankin from December 1998 – January 1999, and was the band's first album where Stuart Eaglesham took over as lead vocalist, following the departure of former lead singer Ivan Drever in 1998. The band themselves were pleased with the album, with Mackenzie saying "as a band we were happy with Seven, it met our expectations of ourselves." The album was released in May 1999 and received positive reviews from music critics. Allmusic said "fans of the band will not be disappointed," whilst The Living Tradition said that "with this album Wolfstone prove they are bigger than any one member and they "rock on"." The band decided to carry on as a band and toured in promotion of Seven in 2000, resulting in the live album Not Enough Shouting, which, among its fourteen tracks, features nine of the eleven tracks on Seven recorded live. Seven and Not Enough Shouting were the band's only albums with pianist-keyboardist Andy Simmers, who committed suicide in April 2000; he had contributed a sombre solo piano instrumental, "John Simmers", to Seven.

== Background and recording ==
In 1996, Wolfstone, then led by Ivan Drever and Stuart Eaglesham, both of whom wrote, sang and played guitar for the band, released their fourth album The Half Tail to critical acclaim. The album was recorded at CaVa Studios, Glasgow, a break from their usual Edinburgh studio of Palladium Studios, and featured a change of producer in Chris Harley. After the release of the album, the line-up slightly changed when keyboardist Struan Eaglesham left the band to start a family. He was replaced by long-time friend and colleague Andy Thorburn, but after "relentless" touring around the globe, drummer Graeme "Mop" Youngson also left the band, as the rigours of being on the road and away from home on an almost constant basis had a "telling effect" on his health. Shortly afterwards, the band had intentions of breaking up, but continued to fill contractual obligations in the form of already booked live concerts throughout 1998–1999. In this period, Aberdonian Ronnie Simpson joined the band on drums and Andy Simmers from Inverness played keyboards.

The band "split up" in 1998, where they found themselves £40,000 in debt as, throughout their career, "they had seen a lot of people make money out of the band, but very little of that ever trickled down to the band members." The "split" was picked up by the newspapers and national radio in a particularly negative way and to the casual reader may have led to the impression that the wider interest in traditional music was in decline, and many people were annoyed by the coverage. Furthermore, the band could not "really plan any future work as Wolfstone" whilst still under the contract of their record label Green Linnet Records. A collaboration album between Drever and the band's bassist Wayne Mackenzie, originally released as Drever-Mackenzie in 1997, was re-released as Wolfstone album entitled This Strange Place in 1998 as a contract filler. The album, which features a much softer tone than Wolfstone, was released to mixed reviews when issued as a Wolfstone album, with many fans unaware that this was a repackaging of a side-project release and that the band had not "mellowed". Drever and the band's fiddlist Duncan Chisholm recorded their side-project collaboration album The Lewis Blue, released on Wolfstone's former label Iowa Records in 1998, before Drever himself left Wolfstone, leaving Eaglesham by default to become the sole leading force in the band.

Nonetheless, the band had ambitions to continue as Wolfstone, and in 1998, the band realised that "at some point they had to make 'the big decision', whether to continue or not," but, before making that decision about their long-term future, from August 1998 the band still had to fulfill the last elements of their contract with Green Linnet Records, whose contract required another album from the band, with this album ultimately being Seven. The remaining members of the band chose to write and record the required album with full attention, rather than make a "half-hearted" album. MacKenzie explained: "We could have just gone through the motions and made a half-hearted attempt at an album, but we didn’t. The band and our fans mean far too much to us to do that." The band recorded the album with new drummer Tony Soave from December 1998 – January 1999. Pleased with Robin Rankin's co-production work on The Half Tail, the band rehired him to co-produce Seven. The band themselves were pleased with the album, with Mackenzie saying "as a band we were happy with Seven, it met our expectations of ourselves." Commenting in 2001, they said "we are as much a folk band as we ever were, Duncan is the strong traditional influence, but we all come from different musical backgrounds."

== Music ==
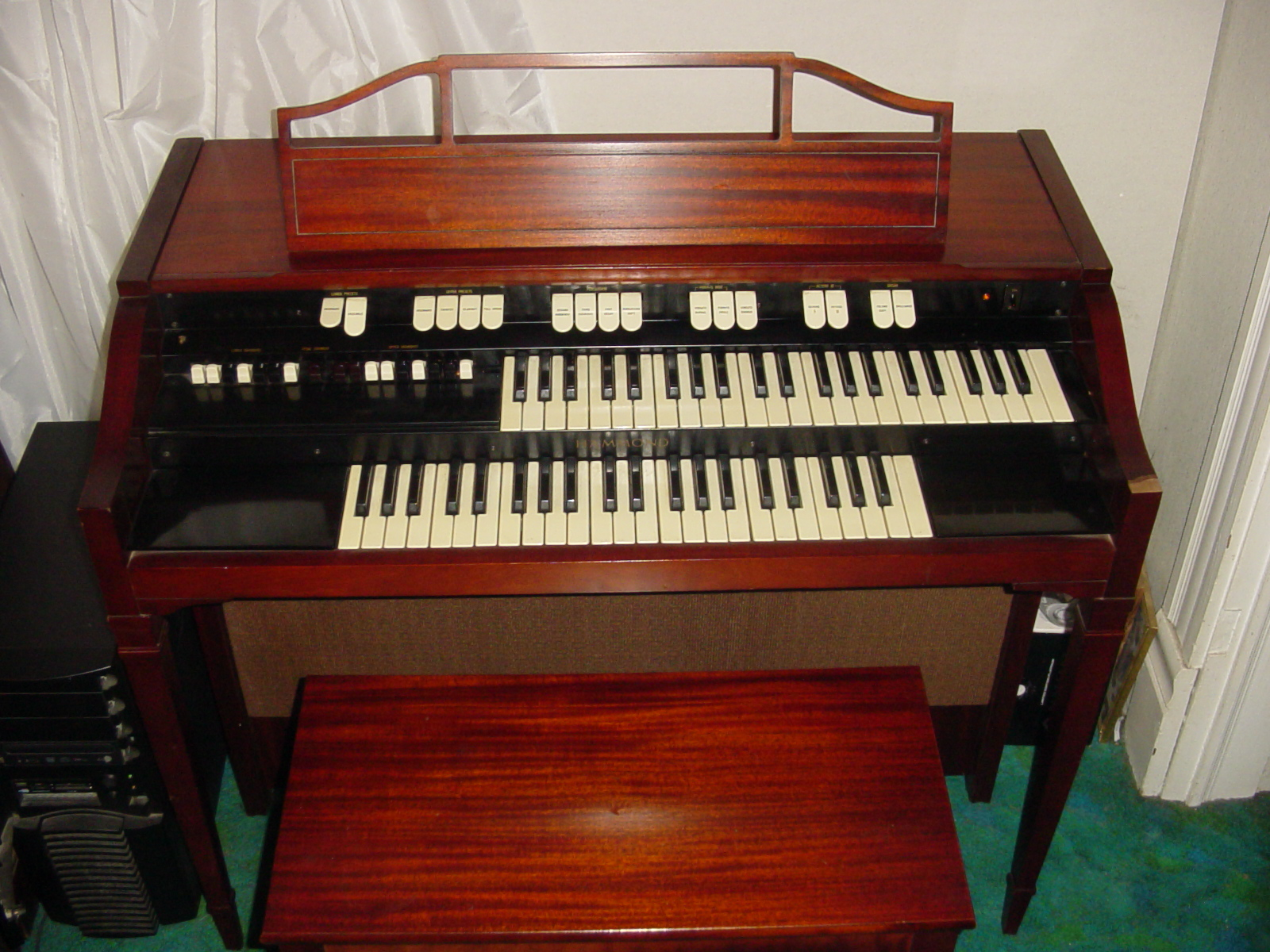
"Brave Boys" features a Hammond organ.

Seven consists of songs written and sung by Eaglesham and numerous instrumentals, most of them originals by the band. Describing the sound of the album, Chris Mackenzie of The Living Tradition said that "straight from the off it's all there. Thumping bass, big guitar chords, Rock and Roll drumming and of course the twin hendrixs of fiddle and pipe giving the unique Wolfstone sound." He also commented that, "however, a full CD of full throttle ceilidh would be tough on the neck muscles of even the most ardent rocker so they do slow it down occasionally." Rick Anderson of Allmusic commented that, "as rock & reel bands go, this Scots band is considerably more rock than reel," saying the band's approach "is sort of an inversion of that taken by groups like the Oyster Band and the Pogues, whose music is based on traditional material infused with a rockish intensity. In Wolfstone's music there's plenty of Highland pipes and fiddle, but the predominant voices in the mix are overdriven electric guitars and drums; the overall impression is one of rock & roll infused with Celtic influences rather than the other way around. And if the singing sometimes comes off as a bit fey, it's fey in a heavy metal sort of way, high-pitched and modestly operatic."

Opening instrumental "Psycho Woman" shows the band in "full flow", with Mackenzie saying it shows "Wolfstone kick more ass than Rambo and RoboCop put together and are tighter than Pamela Anderson's swimsuit." "Brave Boys", which Anderson said seemed "to be an antiwar tune", features Stuart Eaglesham delivering "a lovely melody over a churning Hammond organ and driving acoustic guitars, whilst "a fiddle keens away in the distance." Two of the instrumental sets, "Quinie Fae Ryhnie" and "Maggie's", were described by Mackenzie as showing Wolfstone "prove that when they really want to rock the joint they can do it at will." The former track was noted for its experimentation. "Jen's Tune" and "John Simmers", the latter a "delicately played" track featuring Andy Simmers on piano, the only musician and instrument on the track, provide a "perfect foil to the hard rocking of the rest of the CD." "John Simmers" fades into "J-Time", one of the band's most celebrated instrumentals. "Fingal's Cave" is an extract of poetry by Ian Chrichton Smith set to a tradition tune.

== Release, reception and tour ==
Professional ratings
Review scores
Source	Rating
Allmusic	4/5 stars
The Daily Vault	(B−)
The Living Tradition	(favourable)

The album was released on 18 May 1999 by Green Linnet Records. Although it is the band's fifth official studio album, the album was named Seven as it is their seventh "official" album overall, including This Strange Place and 1997 compilation Pick of the Litter, disregarding the band's early, originally unreleased albums. The album was released to critical acclaim, with critics impressed with the band after the departure of Drever. Rick Anderson of Allmusic rated the album four stars out of five and said that "fans of the band will not be disappointed." He called the instrumentals "fine" and complimented Eaglesham's melody on "Brave Boys" as "lovely". Chris Mackenzie of The Living Tradition was also very favourable, commending the band's strength after the departure of Drever, saying "with this album Wolfstone prove they are bigger than any one member and they "rock on"." He said "Ivan Drever's absence might not make a huge difference to the Wolfstone sound in full flight but he defined the vocal sound of the band. Despite Ivan and Stuart Eaglesham sharing vocal duties over the last few albums, Ivan was the Wolfstone sound. Well he isn't anymore, Stuart has the floor, and he acquits himself well." He described "Quinie Fae Ryhnie" as "excellent" and "John Simmers" as "delightful". Duke Egbert of The Daily Vault was less favourable, grading the album "B−" and questioning the near-absence of bagpipes. He did, however, point out numerous stand out tracks and moments.

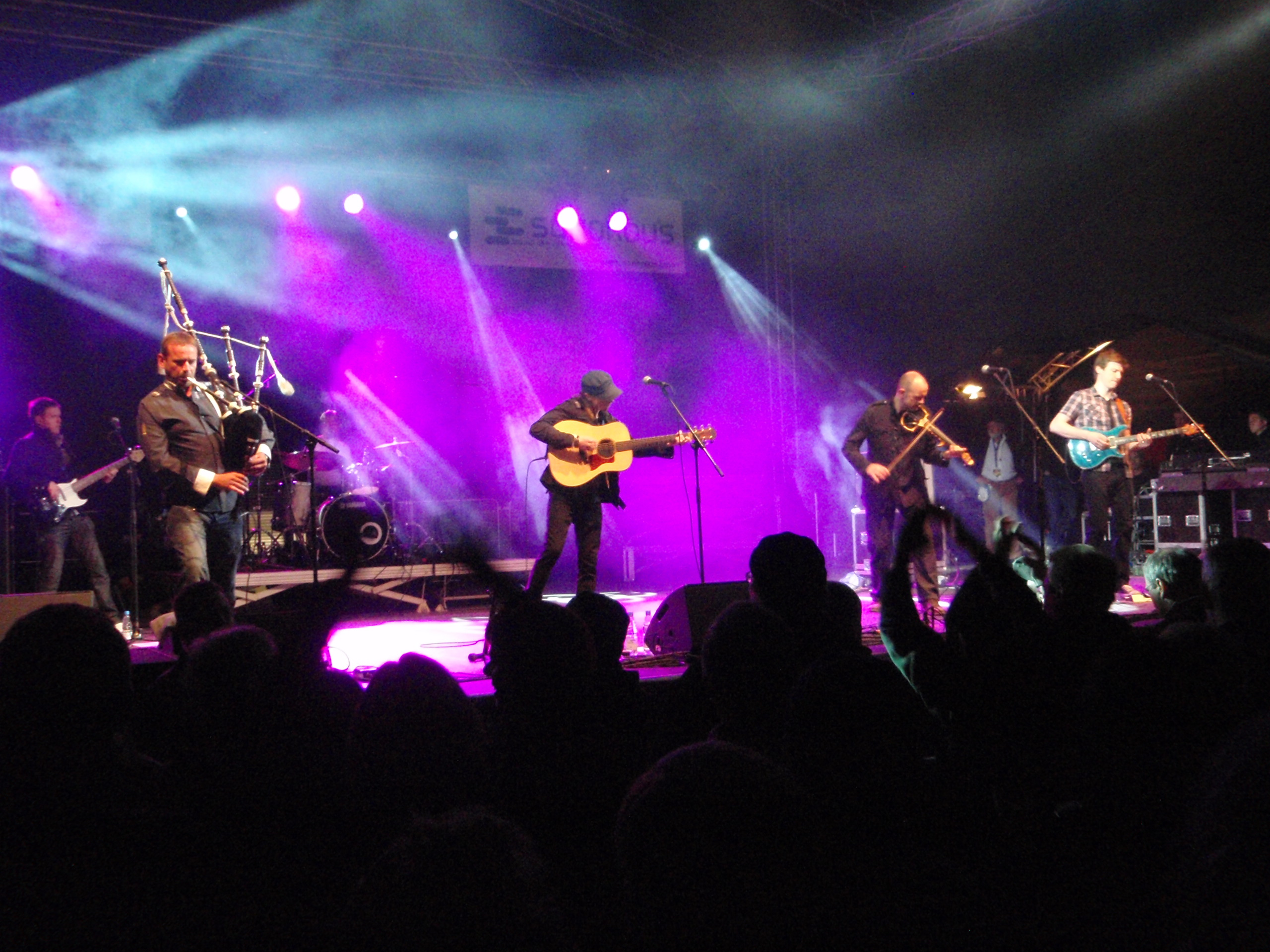
The band (pictured in 2011) decided to continue being a live band, and toured Seven in 2000.

Although the band's financial problems continued, with "legitimate bills for costs incurred during tours" often coming as a complete surprise to the band members, "the mess" was eventually "sorted out". Mackenzie said "when we realised the extent of the problems, I personally phoned everybody and said 'we have a debt and we will pay it. How can we work it out?’ It took us three and half years to sort it out - but we did it." MacKenzie had pointed out "that they now don’t owe anybody anything." Having already escaped from their financial and contractual obligations, the band carried on making a "fresh start", touring in promotion of Seven, and continuing to tour even after keyboardist Andy Simmers committed suicide in April 2000. Pete Heywood of The Living Tradition recalled "there was much soul searching" in the band after Simmers' death, "but fan encouragement, which had played a big part in their tale over the last fifteen years, was a major factor in them deciding to get back on the road."

The band recorded the live album Not Enough Shouting on the tour in January and February, which was released in 2000 and features nine of the eleven tracks from Seven alongside five older tracks by the band. The album was conceived as "an important element" of the band's "plan to re-establish the band as a touring unit," and was released to critical acclaim as the first release on the band's newly established record label, Once Bitten Records, where they had control over promotion and were able to maximise the impact of sales at gigs. The band followed Seven with Almost an Island in 2002, which squashed rumours that Seven would be the band's final studio album. Several of the tracks from Seven have since appeared on numerous various artists compilation albums. "J-Time" featured as the band's sole entry into Green Linnet Records' anniversary "best-of" album Green Linnet Records: 25 Years of Celtic Music (2001), and also featured on Mandeca Records' compilation Celtic: The Essential Album (2002), whilst "Psycho Woman" was included on CNR Music's Belgium-released Friends of Folk: Volume 4 compilation (1999).

== Track listing ==
1. "Psycho Woman" – 3:12
2. "Brave Boys" – 5:35
3. "Jen's Tune" – 4:15
4. "Black Dog" – 3:36
5. "Quinie fae Rhynie" – 3:28
  - Struan & Frazer's
  - Quinie fae Rhynie
6. "John Simmers" – 2:11
7. "J-Time" – 4:41
8. "Wild and the Free" – 4:45
9. "Crowfeathers" – 6:38
10. "Maggie's" – 4:28
  - Maggie's Pancakes
  - In and out the Harbour
11. "Fingal's Cave" – 6:13

== Personnel ==
- Duncan Chisholm – vocals, fiddle.
- Stuart Eaglesham – lead vocals, acoustic guitar.
- Wayne Mackenzie – Bass, Vocals.
- Stevie Saint – Tin whistle, Bagpipe.
- Andy Simmers – Piano, Keyboards.
- Tony Soave – Drums.
- Marc Clement – Background vocals.
- Marc Duff – Bodhran [Irish frame drum].
- Colette O'Leary – Accordion.
- Robin Rankin – Tambourin
