= Coast (folk rock band) =

Scottish-English rock group

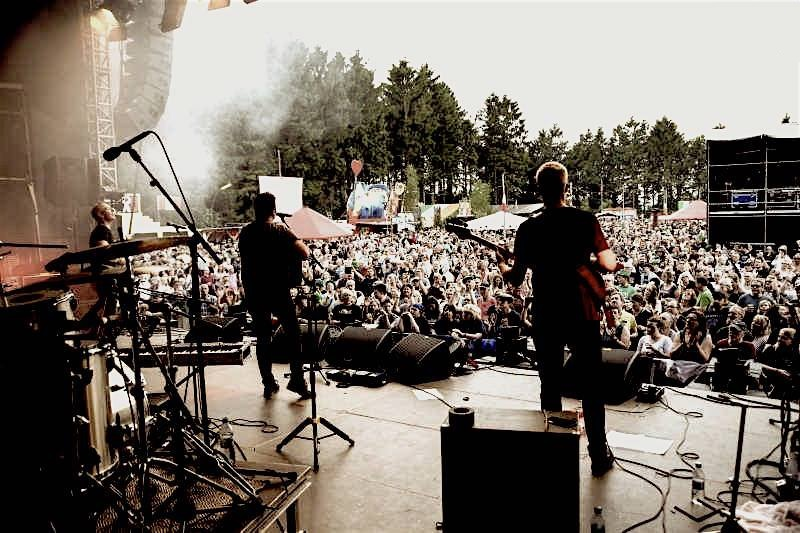
- Coast performing in Poyenberg, Germany in 2018.

Background information
- Origin: Southampton, Hampshire, UK
- Genres: Rock
- Years active: 2007–present
- Labels: Ruabhal Records; Recart (Denmark)
- Members: Paul Eastham; Chris Barnes; Finlay Wells
- Past members: Graeme "Mop" Youngson; Dave Williamson; Andy Murray; Steve Lawrence; Chris Greer; Nick Tann; Andrej Chernjavskij; Andy Davey; Hamish Ferguson; Steve Picken; Mark Mongan; Charlie Goodall; Russ Barnes; Alec Stone; Chris Lappage; Adam Bowden; Phil Marshall; Phil Langman; Ray Drury
- Website: Official website

Coast is a Scottish-English rock group from Southampton, based in Oban. It is not to be confused with another Scottish rock band or another English rock band. Members are Paul Eastham (lead vocals, keyboards, guitars, accordion), Chris Barnes (percussion) and Finlay Wells (guitars).

== Early history ==
Coast was formed in winter 2007 by the Stockport born singer-songwriter Paul Eastham and his brother, Chris Barnes. A classically trained pianist, Eastham had previously co-written and co-produced the first EP by the Welsh singer Duffy, Aimée Duffy, which was released in 2004 under the Welsh Awen Records label. Eastham also played keyboards, synthesizers and guitar on the EP.

Coast's first EP was The Great Crowd, released in January 2008, also on Awen Records. Per Paul Eastham in the accompanying DVD for the album "'10'", Coast was originally intended to be a studio-only project. But due to the positive online reaction to the title track, a live lineup was soon assembled. Coast performed their first live show at the Storm Club in Leicester Square, London, on 12 March 2008.

In May 2009, Coast was asked to record the official single for "Saints Aid", a charity event organized by Southampton Football Club fans to raise funds to keep the club from going into liquidation. The single, "Colours", was released on 18 May 2009 and the band appeared at the Saints Aid music festival at St Mary's Stadium in Southampton on 23 May 2009. In September 2009, "Colours" hit the top of the German Web Radio Charts.

== Eponymous Debut Album Coast and The Turning Stone ==
The band released their first full-length album, Coast, on 21 November 2009 in conjunction with a sold-out album launch show at the Talking Heads in Southampton. The album was first previewed on the Karin Ingram Show on Radio Borders on 15 November 2009.

Coast appeared on the Sally Taylor Show on BBC Radio Solent on 23 January 2010 before their appearance at the Danny Kyle Open Stage of Glasgow's Celtic Connections music festival on 24 January 2010. The band's show at Oban on 26 February was reviewed by The Oban Times. On 8 March 2010, Celtic Music Radio in Glasgow selected Coast as its Album of the Week

It was announced on 16 March 2010 that Coast would appear on the same bill as Donnie Munro, Steve Harley, Status Quo and the Sugababes at the Rock4Life music festival near Inverness in May 2010. However, the festival was eventually cancelled by the organisers because of financial problems.

On 9 April 2010, it was announced that Coast would play their first non-UK show at the annual Tønder Festival in Denmark at the end of August 2010. Coast played on the same stage as the Scottish folk rock bands Wolfstone and The Chair. In May 2010, Eastham and then-bassist Adam Bowden collaborated with the Kent-based musician Trevor Osborne to record and produce the England World Cup song "Go Win for England". The track was recorded under the pseudonym The Bulldog Brothers and released on the Awen Records label. That summer, Coast were runners-up in a competition run by the Southampton-based radio station Wave 105.2 to support Bon Jovi at the O2 arena in London in June 2010. Coast played at the Tønder Festival on 27 and 29 August 2010. The award-winning Scottish fiddler Duncan Chisholm from Wolfstone joined Coast onstage to play fiddle on the song "The Beat of You", co-written by Coast lead singer Eastham and Iain Bayne.

On 7 November 2010, Radio Borders gave Coast's new single, "The Beat of You" from their upcoming album, its first radio airplay. The single features Duncan Chisholm from Wolfstone. "The Beat of You" was released on 19 November 2010 in download format only. Coast released their second album, The Turning Stone, on 7 May 2011 through their own Ruabhal Records label. The band performed an album launch show at The Ironworks in Inverness on the same date. They were supported by Donald MacDonald and The Islands and The Gritters. Eddie Jordan from the Scottish new wave band Fiction Factory joined Coast on stage, playing the accordion on the song "Oceanos".

In May 2011, Coast announced that they had signed a CD distribution deal in Denmark with RecArt Entertainment Group. The band was subsequently dropped by the label in 2013. On 12 June 2011, Coast played at the 50th Anniversary Concert for the German retail giant Saturn, attended by over 10,000 Saturn employees. Also playing at the event was the Canadian singer/songwriter Bryan Adams and the chart topping German acts Unheilig and Die Fantastischen Vier.

On 21 June 2011, Coast front man Eastham released An Cuan Siar, a solo album of piano instrumentals.

== Believe and Dancing With Satellites ==
The band released the three-track EP Believe on 28 October 2012. The CD included the new song "Believe" in addition to a radio edit version of "The Caller" and the original version of "Keep Loving". After wrapping up touring in support of Believe, Eastham released the solo single "Feel" on 14 February 2013.

In late 2013, former Wolfstone lead guitarist Andy Murray joined the lineup. On 1 December 2013, Eastham released the solo EP Something and Nothing.

Coast released a Bruce Springsteen tribute song, "I Wanna Sing with the Boss", on 2 February 2014, on the band's official YouTube channel only. In April 2014, the band completed the recording of a new four-track EP, Dancing with Satellites. The EP was produced and mixed by James Sanger at Vibey Studios in France. Sanger had previously worked on recordings by artists such as Dido, Keane, Pet Shop Boys and Phil Collins. In May 2014, Eastham released the solo album PoW in CD and download formats. After being recruited by Andy Murray, Finlay Wells joined Coast on bass guitar in time for their tour in Denmark during July 2014 in support of the new EP. Dancing With Satellites was officially released on 21 July 2014. Later that year, Eastham collaborated with opera singer Tony Henry to compose, record and produce the EP Percosi.

In 2015, Eastham released, in CD format only, the solo album Iron Horse.

== Windmills in the Sky ==
On 6 March 2016, the band announced that they had started work on a third studio album, to be called Windmills in the Sky. The album was planned for release in early 2017. At the same time, the band announced that ex-Wolfstone drummer Graeme "Mop" Youngson had joined the band. It was also announced that they were relocating from Southampton, England to Oban, Scotland. In August 2016, Murray left the band to concentrate on other musical projects. Finlay Wells took over on lead guitar in the band while also playing bass guitar on studio recordings. On 3 January 2017, Coast released a radio edit of the track "River" for radio airplay only, from their forthcoming album Windmills in the Sky. On 31 January 2017, Windmills in the Sky, was pre-released to their fan base who had signed up for pre-order. An official public release was planned for later in 2017. Coast embarked on a tour of Denmark in January and February 2017 with Midge Ure bassist Dave Williamson joining the live lineup. Youngson and Williamson departed the band in early 2018.

== 10 ==
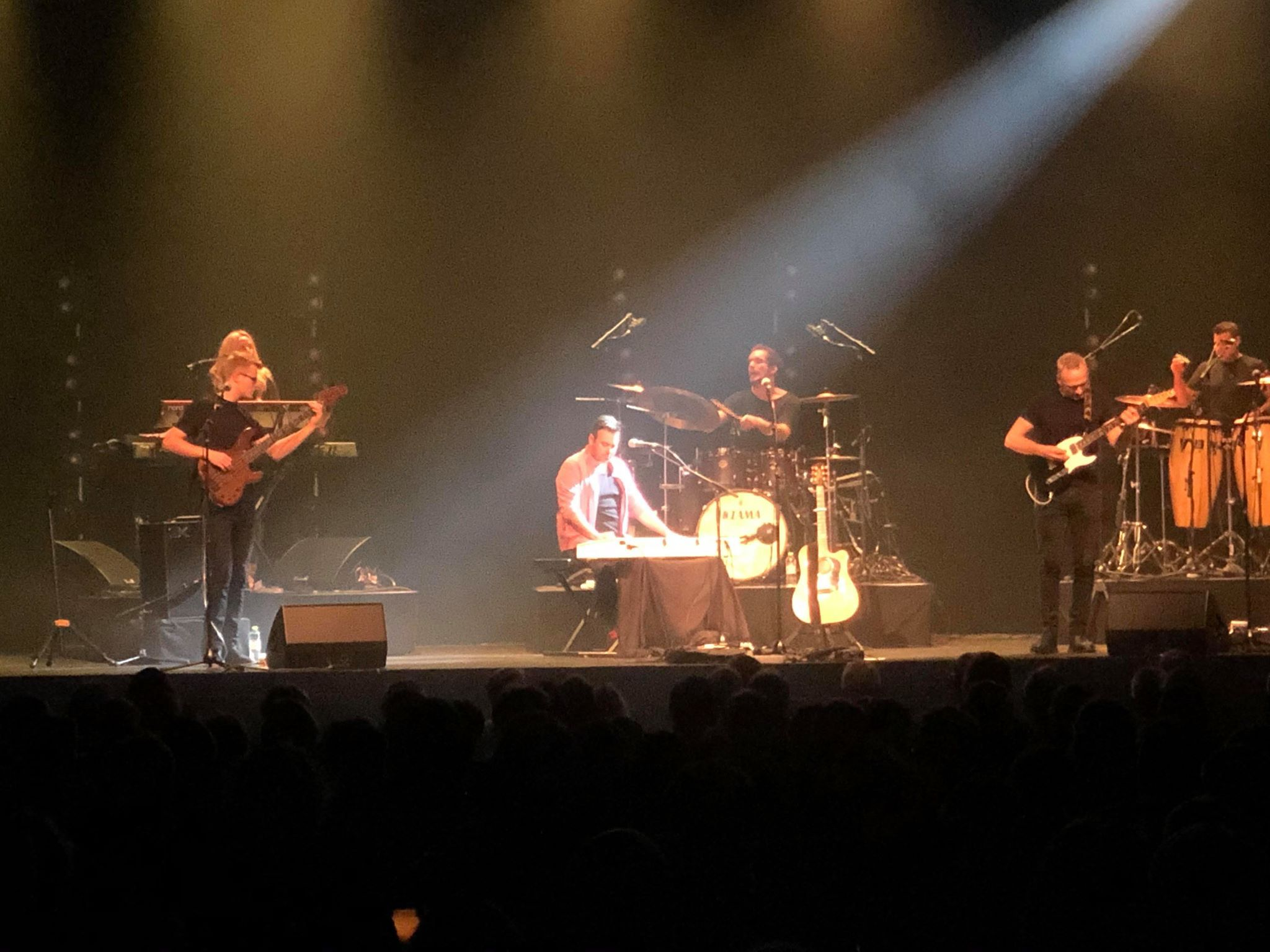
Coast in Denmark during the 2019 '10' tour.

In late 2018, the band began laying the groundwork for a special album and DVD package to celebrate the 10th anniversary of the release of their debut eponymous album. The album, entitled 10, featured two brand new tracks, "Who Loves You Now" and "Drift Away". Two of the tracks, though not new, had never before been featured on a Coast full-length album ("I Wanna Sing with the Boss" and the Finlay Wells-penned "Lament For Nick"). The rest of the tracks were new recordings of previous songs reflecting how they were now being played live. Coast toured in the summer and fall of 2019 in Germany, Denmark and Sweden in support of the album. By now, the permanent members of the band were Paul Eastham, Chris Barnes and Finlay Wells.

== Discography ==
=== Albums ===
- Coast (21 November 2009, Awen Records)
- The Turning Stone (7 May 2011, Ruabhal Records)
- Windmills in the Sky (31 January 2017, Ruabhal Records)
- 10 (CD/DVD Package, 1 October 2019, Ruabhal Records)

=== Singles & EPs ===
- The Great Crowd – EP with the tracks "The Great Crowd", "These Walls" and "Sepia Eyes" (7 January 2008, Awen Records)
- "Colours" – official "Saints Aid" single (18 May 2009, Awen Records)
- "Oceanos" – acoustic remix of the opening track of the Coast debut album, released in download format only (21 October 2010, Awen Records)
- "The Beat of You" – released in download format only (19 November 2010, Awen Records)
- Believe – with the tracks "Believe", "The Caller (Radio Edit)" and "Keep Loving" (28 October 2012, Ruabhal Records)
- Dancing with Satellites – EP with the tracks "Dancing with Satellites", "Long Way Home", "The Ones We Left Behind" and "Someone". Tracks 1, 2 and 3 were produced and mixed by James Sanger at Vibey Studios, France, (21 July 2014, Ruabhal Records)

== Guest artists ==
The following guest artists have appeared on Coast releases and/or in live shows:

- Craig Ainslie (Roddy Woomble band) – bass (Summer 2018 Windmills in the Sky tour dates)
- Iain Bayne (Runrig) – lyrics and drums ("The Beat of You" single)
- Duncan Chisholm (Wolfstone) – fiddle (Tønder Festival 2010, "The Beat of You" single, Folk im Schlosshof Festival 2011)
- Arnie Cottrell – mandolin (The Turning Stone album)
- Georgette Cullum – backing vocals (Coast and 10 albums, Coast album launch show and 2019-2020 10 tours)
- Eddie Jordan (Fiction Factory) – accordion (The Turning Stone album launch show)
- Mary Ann Kennedy – Gaelic vocals on the track "Is Sinn Na Tuinn Air Bhàrr A' Chuain" on the Windmills in the Sky album
- Emily Keohan – backing vocals (The Turning Stone album)
- Mathias Lassen – drums (10 album and tour drummer 2018–2020)
- Ewan MacDonald (Ceòl an Aire) – bass guitar (tour bassist 2018–2020)
- Lorne MacDougall (Red Hot Chilli Pipers) performed all of the bagpipes on the album Windmills in the Sky
- Charlie McKerron (Capercaillie) – Fiddles on the album Windmills in the Sky
- Tam Stewart – bagpipes (Coast album, various live shows)
- Dave Williamson (Midge Ure band) – bass guitar (Coast Danish tour January/February 2017)
