= Ivan Drever =

Ivan Drever is a Scottish folk singer, songwriter and guitarist. He often tours with fiddler Duncan Chisholm who founded the Celtic rock band Wolfstone which Drever joined in 1990 but left in later years. Drever has mixed traditional folk with some rock and roll sounds.

== Life ==
Drever spent his childhood as one of ten children on Sanday, one of the islands of Orkney in Scotland. Interest in music was clear from a young age with Drever winning youth talent shows at 12. He enjoyed country music and Jim Reeves. In 1974 he founded the band 'Knowe O'Deil' and stayed until the late 1980s. In the 1990s Drever moved to Easter Ross and joined Wolfstone. Drever spent many years in the Scottish town of Inverness which inspired many songs. His album 'Waterfront' is named after a favourite bar and restaurant there. Drever has 4 children, including musician Kris Drever.

== Career ==
In 1989 he released his debut album, Homeland. In 1990 Drever joined Wolfstone where he played guitar, cittern, whistle, mandola and pipes as well as providing lead vocals and songwriting but pursued a flourishing career of solo and duo work. In 1998 Drever and Duncan Chisholm released their own album, Lewis Blue. In the early 1990s Drever released a duo album with fellow Wolfstone member, Struan Eaglesham. 'Long December Night' is a recent duo album (also released as DVD) with Duncan Chisholm. Apart from his continuing collaboration with Duncan Chisholm, Drever has often joined up with other musicians, either as a duo with Bruce MacGregor, as Band with "The Vast Majority" or with former Wolfstone members Mop Youngston and Andy Murray as "The Black Sheep" in 2007. Due to Mop Yongston's illness, they could not continue touring. This project, however, has been revived as the Ivan Drever Band. The current line-up now includes Finlay Wells (bass), Iain Coates (drums) and Andy Murray (guitar). In 1998, he took a side-project from Wolfstone with the album This Strange Place, although this album was marketed as a Wolfstone album. That same year, he and Duncan Chisholm issued their collaboration album, The Lewis Blue.

== The Ivan Drever Band ==
The Ivan Drever Band is a folk-meets-rock band featuring Ivan Drever, Andy Murray, Finlay Wells and Iain Coates. They have released an EP with 5 songs: Every Beat of the Drum, Harbour Lights, Ballad of Jimmy Fry, Walk Beside Your Shoes and Stranger's Tongue. A full album, 'Sea Air', is to be released soon after their current tour of the UK and Denmark.

=== Career highlights ===
- 2001- One of Ivan's most popular projects which gained huge media interest was a Californian dance spectacular named 'Celtic Fusion' in which he provided the music and toured not only in the UK but in the US with the high-profile team. He was the chief songwriter.
- The popular Irish band The Dubliners have recorded some of his tunes.
- The 1997 film Good Will Hunting included one of Ivan and Duncans songs.
- In 1988 he recorded a duo album, 'October Bridge', with Dick Clarke
- In 1996 he hosted a BBC Radio 2 documentary about the Islands of Scotland
- In 2016 he records "Live In Orkney" at the Orkney Folk Festival in Stromness Town Hall. The album is released in the following year

== Solo albums ==
- Homeland (1989)
- Isles Ne'er Forgotten (1992, re-released in 1999)
- Every Breaking Heart (1992)
- Four Walls (1996)
- Black, White And Blue (2000)
- The Orkney Years Vol. 1 (1998, Collection of previous songs 1986–1992)
- The Orkney Years Vol. 2 (2006)
- Tradition (2004)
- Waterfront (2006)
- Notes from an Island (2010)
- Bless The Wind (2011)
- Keep on keeping on (2012)
- Music from the Vaults Vol. 1 (2013)
- What you hear (2014)
- Revisited - The Wolfstone Songs (2015)
- Revisited II (2016)
- Live In Orkney (2017)
- Decade (2022)
- Dreev (2023)

== Duo albums ==
The Knowe O'Deil (with Ian Cooper)

- Orkney Anthem (1986)
- The Viking's Bride (1987)

with Dick Clarke

- October Bridge (1988)

with Struan Eagelsham

- Back to Back (1994)

with Wayne Mackenzie

- Drever Mackenzie (1997, re-released as a Wolfstone album "This Strange Place“ in 1998)

with Duncan Chisholm

- The Lewis Blue (1998)
- Long December Night (2004, also as DVD)

== Other albums ==
- Celtic Fusion (2003)
- Number One (2007, EP "The Black Sheep")
- Every Beat of The Drum (2009, EP "Ivan Drever Band")
- Gifts (2012 with Drever McGuire Young)
- The Return Of The Shoestring Orchestra (2014 with Drever McGuire Young)

== Wolfstone albums with Ivan Drever ==
- Unleashed (1991)
- The Chase (1992)
- Burning Horizons (1993)
- Year of the Dog (1994)
- The Half Tail (1996)
- Pick of the Litter (1997)
- This Strange Place (1998)
