= This Strange Place =

Studio album by Wolfstone
- Released: Summer 1997 (as Drever-Mackenzie); 24 February 1998 (as This Strange Place)
- Recorded: 1997
- Genre: Celtic rock
- Length: 41:56
- Label: Green Linnet Records

Wolfstone chronology
The Half Tail (1996)	This Strange Place (1997)	Seven (1999)

Professional ratings
Review scores
Source	Rating
Allmusic	3/5 stars

This Strange Place is a project album featuring members of Celtic rock band Wolfstone. Originally released in 1997 under the name and artist credit of Drever-Mackenzie, it was reissued as a Wolfstone recording with the new title This Strange Place, perhaps, it has been suggested, as a contract filler.

== Background ==
Wolfstone's The Half Tail was released in 1996 to success. Following this, the band's vocalist Ivan Drever worked on a side project with bassist Wayne Mackenzie with additional contributions from other members of Wolfstone. The project was independently released in 1997 as a self-titled album credited to Drever-Mackenzie. The following year, Green Linnet Records re-released the album as a Wolfstone recording; its mellow style disappointed many Wolfstone fans.

Drever later left the band before the release of Seven in 1999. Drever and Wolfstone fiddle player Duncan Chisholm released The Lewis Blue in 1998 which was noted, musically, as being closer to being a Wolfstone album than This Strange Place.

== Track listing ==
1. "Harlequin" - 3:57
  - The Harlequin
  - Pipe Major Stevie Saint
2. "This Girl" - 4:23
3. "Let Them Sing" - 3:18
4. "Banks of the Ness" - 4:14
5. "This Strange Place" - 4:02
6. "Stevie's Set" - 3:54
  - The Wild Monkey Dance
  - Black Eyed Jam
7. "Till I Sleep" - 4:22
8. "The Arab Set" - 3:49
  - An Arab in the Court of Kintail
  - The Redwood Reel
9. "Reluctant Journey" - 4:40
10. "Kazakhstan" - 5:15
  - A Thief in the Night
  - The Hills of Kazakhstan
