= The Lewis Blue =

Studio album by Duncan Chisholm and Ivan Drever
- Released: 1998 (original release); 1 January 2008 (reissue)
- Recorded: 1998
- Genre: Celtic fusion
- Label: Iona Records

Duncan Chisholm and Ivan Drever chronology
Pick of the Litter (1997)	The Lewis Blue (1998)	A Lonely December Night (2007)

The Lewis Blue is an album by Scottish Celtic musicians Ivan Drever and Duncan Chisholm, released in 1998. At the time, both musicians were members of Wolfstone (though Drever left shortly after the album's release).

The album was released around the same time as the controversial album This Strange Place, which had initially been released as a side project by Wolfstone vocalist Ivan Drever and bass player Wayne Mackenzie but was subsequently re-released in identical form as a Wolfstone album. At the time, many fans noted that The Lewis Blue was "the Wolfstone album of 1998, not This Strange Place".

The album was rated 3 out of 5 stars by AllMusic.

== Track listing ==
1. "The Flower of Kristiansand" – 4:19
2. "Snowdrops in the Rain" – 3:28
3. "Fiddle Reels" – 4:00
  1. "Maggie's Pancakes"
  2. "The Little Cascade"
4. "Leaving the Harbour" – 3:26
5. "Night in That Land" – 3:20
6. "Three Jigs" – 3:28
  1. "Sonny Brogan's"
  2. "Burke's"
  3. "Trip to Leverkusen"
7. "The Battle of Falkirk" – 4:10
8. "Bonnie Lindsay" – 3:43
9. "Warm Embrace" – 3:06
10. "Two Reels : The Ramnee Ceilidh" – 2:58
11. "The Lewis Blue" – 3:32
