= These Are the Days =

These Are the Days may refer to:

== Film and television ==
- These Are the Days (TV series), a 1970s American animated series
- These Are the Days, a 2000 concert video by Estradasphere

== Music ==
=== Albums ===
- These Are the Days (Lit album) or the title song, 2017
- These Are the Days (Saybia album), 2004
- These Are the Days, by Dave Hensman, 2006
- These Are the Days, by Jann Arden, 2018
- These Are the Days, by Love & the Outcome, 2016

=== Songs ===
- "These Are the Days" (S Club song), 2023
- "These Are the Days" (Ian McNabb song), 1991
- "These Are the Days" (Van Morrison song), 1989
- "These Are the Days", by the Exies from A Modern Way of Living with the Truth, 2007
- "These Are the Days", by Flogging Molly from Anthem, 2022
- "These Are the Days", by the Human League from Octopus, 1995
- "These Are the Days", by Jamie Cullum from Twentysomething, 2003
- "These Are the Days", by Lauren Daigle from her self-titled album, 2023
- "These Are the Days", by O-Town from O2, 2002
- "These Are the Days", by Paul Westerberg from Eventually, 1996
- "These Are the Days", by Wolfstone from Terra Firma, 2007
- "These Are the Days", by Inhaler from Cuts & Bruises, 2023

== See also ==
- "These Are Days", a 1992 song by 10,000 Maniacs
