= Jock Duncan =

Scottish singer

- Born: 1925; Gellibrae, New Deer, Aberdeenshire
- Died: 25 March 2021 (aged 95–96); Dundee
- Genres: Bothy ballad
- Occupation: Farmer
- Instrument: Voice
- Years active: 1930s–2021

Jock Duncan (1925 – 25 March 2021) was a Scottish singer from Gelliebrae near New Deer in Aberdeenshire, known for singing many songs and bothy ballads from Aberdeenshire. He had performed at bothy ballad competitions since 1975 and made recordings of his music since 1996. In recognition of his work for furthering Scots singing, Duncan was inducted into the Scottish Traditional Music Hall of Fame in 2006. In 2000, Duncan was given a Herald Angel award from the Edinburgh Festival for his long work with ballad singing.

== Early life ==
Duncan was born on the farm of Gelliebrae, New Deer, Aberdeenshire in 1925. In 1928, the family moved to South Faddenhill, to a farm owned by Duncan's grandfather that his father had taken over. Duncan left school at 14 years old to work on the farm as an orra loon or apprentice.

== Family ==
He was the husband of Frances Duncan and father of Gordon Duncan and Ian Duncan, both well known for piping, as well as Moria and Frances Duncan. He learnt bothy ballads from his uncle Charlie Duncan. Jock's mother was a pianist and his sister Marion was a singer. His brother Jimmy was a fiddler.

Both of his sons as well as his grandson, Alex Duncan, were pipers.

== Work ==
Duncan joined the Royal Air Force when he turned 18 in 1943, spending two years in France during World War II. After the war, he returned to farming. In the 1960s, Duncan worked for the Hydro Board, moving first to Thurso then to Pitlochry.

=== Music ===
In 1960, Duncan featured on the Grampian TV programme Bothy Nichts, as a member of the Fyvie Loons and Quines.

In 1975, Duncan entered and won his first bothy ballad singing contest in Kinross, while in 2004 he came fourth in a contest in Moray. In 2000, he was awarded the Herald Angel award for services to ballad singing, and was inducted into the Scottish Traditional Music Hall of Fame in 2006.

Iona Fyfe credits Duncan as an influence on her own singing, describing him as an "uncle". They met while Duncan was judging the Turra Bothy Ballad competition.

=== Other ===
Over fifty years, from the 1930s, Duncan interviewed Scottish soldiers that fought in World War I, recording all they could remember about country life in the Northeast of Scotland before the war. The 59 soldiers were mostly Scots speakers and Duncan transcribed the soldiers' stories in Scots. After giving all his recordings and transcripts to the University of Edinburgh, an edited book Jock's Jocks: Voices of Scottish Soldiers from the First World War was published in 2019. In April 2019, Jock's Jocks was made into a single-act play and a Scots-language radio programme.

== Death ==
Duncan died on 25 March 2021 in Dundee at the age of 95.

== Discography ==
1996: Ye Shine Whaur Ye Stan!
2001: Tae The Green Woods Gaen
