= Farrar (album) =

Studio album by Duncan Chisholm
- Released: 2008
- Genre: Folk
- Length: 40:50
- Label: Copperfish Records

Duncan Chisholm chronology
The Door of Saints (2001)	Farrar (2008)	Canaich (2010)

Professional ratings
Review scores
Source	Rating
The Scotsman	5/5 stars
FolkWorld	(favourable)

Farrar is the third solo album by Scottish fiddler Duncan Chisholm. It was released in 2008. The album forms the first part of Chisholm's "Strathglass Trilogy", and won him the MG Scots Alba Album of the Year 2008.

Lunasa recorded "250 to Vigo" previously in 2003, for the album Redwood. Whilst Shooglenifty did also in 1994 for Venus in Tweeds.

== Track listing ==
1. "Nuair Bhios Mi Leam Fhin" - 3:45
2. "The Farley Bridge" - 2:22
3. "Lorient Mornings" - 2:39
4. "Farewell to Uist" - 4:40
5. "Mallai Chroch Shli" - 5:56
6. "The Hill of the High Byre" - 5:24
7. "A' Mhairead Og" - 3:39
8. "250 to Vigo" - 3:15
9. "The 303" - 4:30
10. "Alasdair's Tune" - 4:35
