= Canaich =

Studio album by Duncan Chisholm
- Released: 2010
- Genre: Folk
- Length: 41:49
- Label: Copperfish Records

Duncan Chisholm chronology
Farrar (2008)	Canaich (2010)

Professional ratings
Review scores
Source	Rating
The Scotsman	4/5 stars
Rock'n'Reel	4/5 stars
FolkWorld	(favourable)

Canaich is the fourth solo album by Scottish fiddler Duncan Chisholm. It was released in early 2010. The album forms the second part of his intended "Strathglass Trilogy" which began with the release of Farrar in 2008.

== Track listing ==
1. "I Horó 's na Hug Óro Eile" - 2:07
2. "Camhanaich air Machair" - 4:01
3. "Craskie" - 3:36
4. "Isaac's Welcome to the World" - 2:24
5. "The Gentle Light That Wakes Me" - 4:17
6. "Chasing Daylight" - 3:07
7. "Mo Rùn Geal Òg" - 2:27
8. "The Desert Road" - 2:19
9. "Caoineadh Johnny Sheáin Jeaic" - 7:10
10. "Loch Mullardoch" - 4:09
11. "The Exile Reels" - 4:41
12. "Mar a Tha" - 1:31
