= Terra Firma (Wolfstone album) =

Studio album by Wolfstone
- Released: 9 February 2007
- Recorded: 2006
- Studio: Gravity Studios, Glasgow, Scotland
- Genre: Celtic rock, alternative rock
- Length: 42:53
- Label: Once Bitten Records
- Producer: Ross Hamilton, Brian McNeill

Wolfstone chronology
Almost an Island (2002)	Terra Firma (2007)

Professional ratings
Review scores
Source	Rating
The Scotsman	(favourable)
The Irish World	(mixed)
Rock'n'Reel	4/5 stars

Terra Firma is the eighth album by Scottish Celtic rock group Wolfstone. It was released in 2007. It saw Ross Hamilton take over lead vocals, only for him to leave the band a few months later.

Note "Back Home" seamlessly segues into "Break Yer Bass Drone Again" (with ..."Drone Again" actually being a reprise of "Back Home"), giving the impression that both tracks are different parts of the same recording.

The album saw a shift in the change of style, with a more alternative rock approach taken to it.

== Track listing ==
1. "Back Home" – 3:02
2. "Break Yer Bass Drone Again" – 3:16
3. "These Are the Days" – 4:52
  - Dod's Tartan Punk Rock Trews
  - These Are the Days
4. "The Bloody Bouzouki" – 4:39
  - Ben-Y-Vrackie
  - The Bloody Bouzouki
5. "Paella Grande" – 3:33
  - The Reel Mackay Wedding
  - Paella Grande
6. "Put Me Together" – 4:08
7. "Falun Fine" – 4:24
  - Asturian Way
  - Falun Fine
8. "Waiting for the Rain" – 3:46
9. "Broken Levee" – 2:09
10. "By the Wayside" – 5:05
11. "3 am in Edradour" – 2:20
12. "The List" – 1:39

== Personnel ==
- Stevie Saint: pipes, whistles
- Ross Hamilton: lead vocals, electric guitar, programming, percussion, bass guitar, acoustic guitar
- Stuart Eaglesham: acoustic guitar
- Duncan Chisholm: fiddle
- Colin Cunningham: bass guitar
- Alyn Cosker: drums
- Jarlath Henderson: uilleann pipes
- Aidan O'Rourke: fiddle
- Ross Ainslie: whistle
- Brian McNeill: programming
