= Unleashed (Wolfstone album) =

Studio album by Wolfstone
- Released: 1991
- Recorded: Palladium Studios, Edinburgh, Scotland
- Genre: Celtic rock
- Length: 46:48
- Label: Iona Records
- Producer: Phil Cunningham

Wolfstone chronology
Wolfstone II (1990)	Unleashed (1991)	The Chase (1992)

Professional ratings
Review scores
Source	Rating
Allmusic	4.5/5 stars

Unleashed is the official debut album of Scottish Celtic rock band Wolfstone. It was released in 1991.

== Track listing ==
1. "Cleveland Park" - 4:16
  - Cleveland Park
  - The Banks of the Allan
  - Kenny Gillies of Portnalong, Skye
2. "Song for Yesterday" - 5:25
3. "The Silver Spear" - 3:54
  - Paddy Fehey's
  - The Silver Spear
4. "Sleepy Toon" - 3:52
5. "Hector the Hero" - 5:08
6. "The Howl" - 7:31
  - The Louis Reel
  - Morrison's Jig
  - The Shoe Polisher's Jig
7. "Here Is Where the Heart Is" - 5:14
  - Lily the Pict
  - Here Is Where the Heart Is
8. "Hard Heart" - 5:44
9. "Erin" - 5:45
  - The Coast of Austria
  - Toss the Feathers
  - Farewell to Erin
  - Captain Lachlan MacPhail of Tiree

== Preview ==
A preview containing both re-recordings of earlier tracks and samples from the album was issued before its release in 1991, entitled Unleashed: The Preview.

=== Track listing ===
1. "Erin"
2. "Song for Yesterday"
3. "Ready for the Storm"
4. "A Stoir Moi Chroi"

== Personnel ==
- Duncan Chisholm: fiddle
- Stuart Eaglesham: acoustic guitar, electric guitar
- Struan Eaglesham: keyboards
- Ivan Drever: acoustic guitar, lead vocals
- Andy Murray: electric guitar, vocals
- Allan Wilson: pipes, whistle, flute
- Neil Hay: bass guitar
- John Henderson: drums
