= Not Enough Shouting =

Live album by Wolfstone
- Released: 2000
- Recorded: January/February 2000 - The Lemon Tree, Aberdeen / The Old Fruitmarket, Glasgow
- Genre: Celtic rock
- Length: 1:02:24
- Label: Once Bitten Records

Wolfstone chronology
Seven (1999)	Not Enough Shouting (2000)	Almost an Island (2002)

Professional ratings
Review scores
Source	Rating
Allmusic	3/5 stars

Not Enough Shouting is a live album by Scottish Celtic rock band Wolfstone. Recorded after the success of their comeback album Seven, it was the band's first release on their own label, Once Bitten Records.

== Track listing ==
1. "Psycho Woman" - 3:39
2. "Brave Boys" - 4:58
3. "Quinie fae Rhynie" - 3:32
  - Struan & Frazer's
  - Quinie fae Rhynie
4. "Gillies" - 6:40
  - The Sleeping Tune
  - The Noose and the Gillies
5. "Crowfeathers" - 4:59
6. "Ballavanich" - 6:09
  - The Boys from Ballavanich
  - Mrs. Crehan's
7. "Black Dog" - 3:47
8. "John Simmers" - 2:05
9. "J-Time" - 4:39
10. "Wild and the Free" - 4:39
11. "Clueless" - 4:42
  - The Wild Monkey Dance
  - Clueless
  - Richard Dwyer's Reel
  - Sandy MacLeod of Garafad
12. "The Prophet" - 4:14
13. "Tinnie Run" - 3:40
  - The Road to Mount Tinnie Run
  - The Boys of Ballymoat
  - Alan MacPherson of Mosspark
14. "Maggie's" - 4:47
  - Maggie's Pancakes
  - In and out the Harbour
