= West of Eden (band) =

Swedish folk rock band

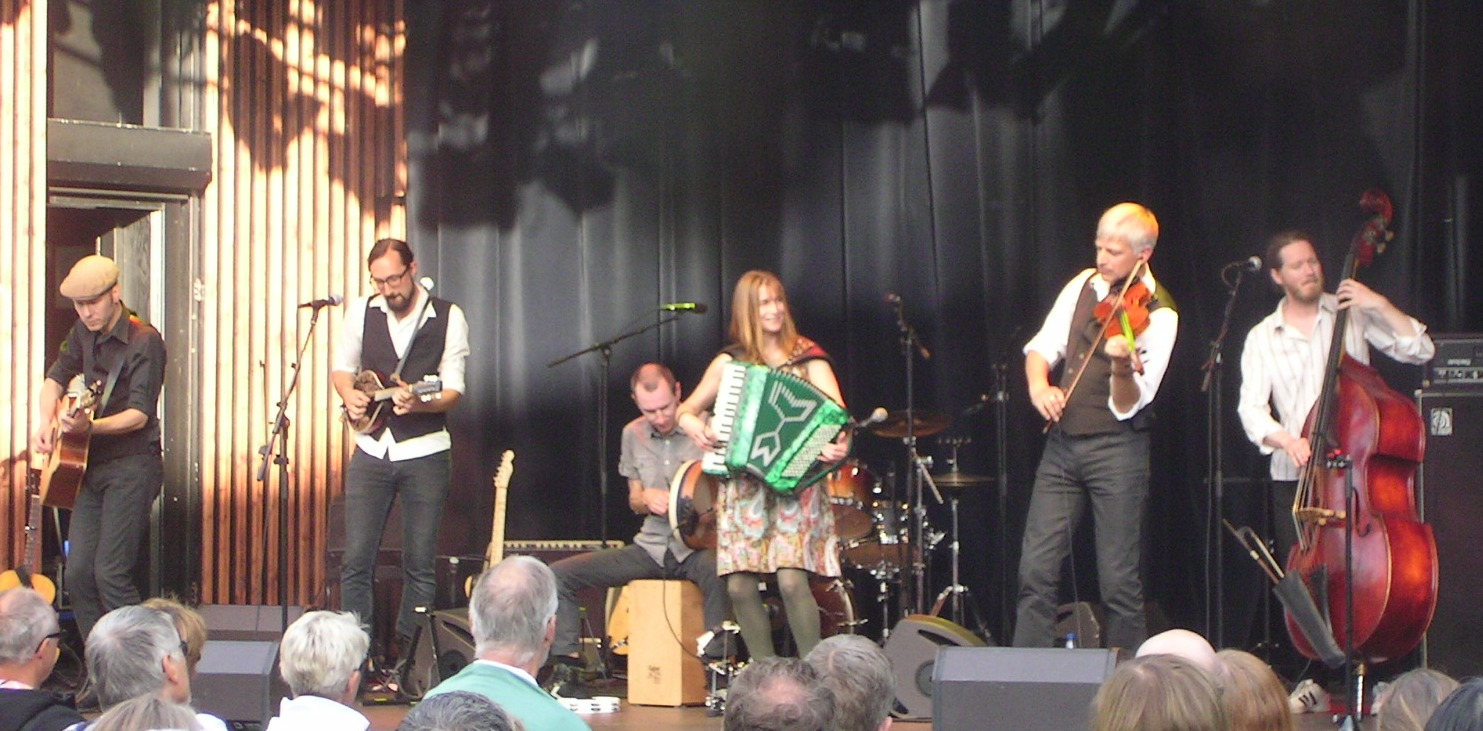
West of Eden 2013

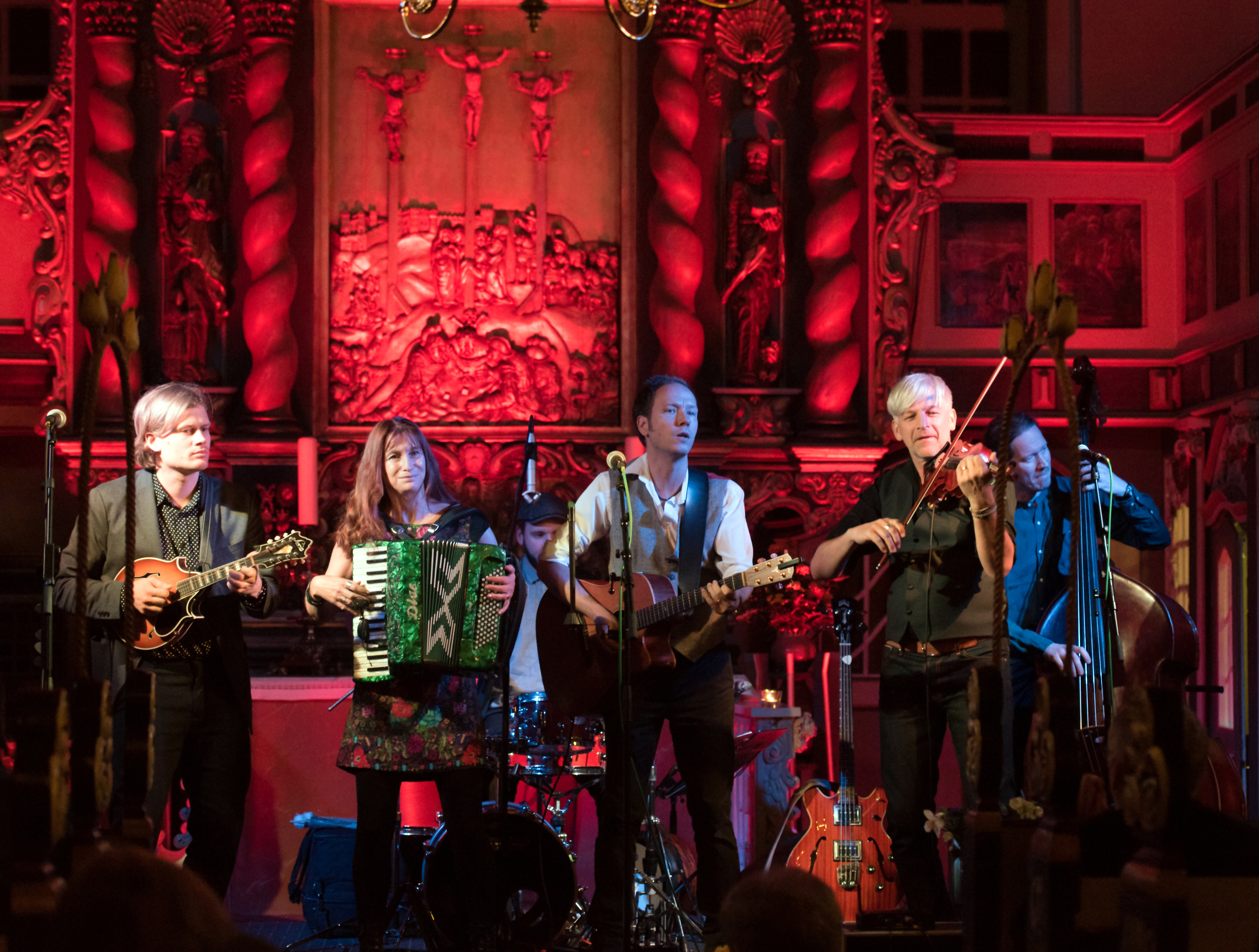
West of Eden at ″Lottes Musiknacht″ 2017

West of Eden is a folk rock band from Gothenburg, Sweden.

The band was formed in 1995 by spouses Jenny and Martin Schaub after they returned from a trip to Dublin, where they fell in love with Celtic folk music. They are the lead vocalists and main songwriters. Martin also plays multiple instruments, produces the albums and arranges and conducts string and brass sections. The band has released thirteen studio albums and a live Christmas album to date. Their repertoire consists mainly of original songs with influences from Irish and Scottish folk music. The sound is characterised by mostly acoustic instruments like violin, accordion and whistle. After initially being more oriented towards pop, they now fall under the genre of folk rock. In addition to Sweden, they have toured England, Ireland, Germany, Belgium, the Netherlands and China.

All lyrics are in English, with the exception of the songs on the 2021 album Taube, which is Swedish. The album contains interpretations of songs written by Evert Taube (1890 – 1976), whom is a legend in Sweden and also hails from Gothenburg.

Throughout the years, many "Guests of Eden" have appeared on the albums. Notable names are (alphabetically) Ron Block, Duncan Chisholm, Steph Geremia, Jarlath Henderson, Filip Jers, Christian Kjellvander, John McCusker, Michael McGoldrick, Damien O'Kane, Kate Rusby, Heidi Talbot, but also former or future band members David Ekh, Øyvind Eriksen and Pär Öjerot appeared as a guest. In 2018, the band covered Timo Räisänens Eld & Aceton, translated into English by Jenny Schaub as Hope, Faith, Theft and performed the song with him in 2019.

Each year West of Eden perform Christmas concerts called Celtic Christmas. Sometimes other artists join the band, like Duncan Chisholm, Triona Marshall (touring member of The Chieftains) or Heidi Talbot.

On November 18, 2025, the band announced the recording of their 15th album was finished. On April 24, Lighthousekeeping was released. It features Michael McGoldrick and John McCusker.

== Current band members ==
- Jenny Schaub: lead and backing vocals, accordion and tin whistle
- Martin Schaub: lead and backing vocals, acoustic guitars, tenor guitar, dobro, mandolin, bouzouki, cittern, keyboard, Hammond organ, rhodes, celesta, piano, pump organ, accordion and glockenspiel
- Ola Karlevo: drums and percussion, cajón, bodhrán and backing vocals (since the beginning)
- Lars Broman: fiddle, viola and backing vocals (since 2009)
- Martin Deubler Holmlund: double bass, bass guitar and backing vocals (since 2013)
- Henning Sernhede: electric and acoustic guitars, mandolin (since 2016)

== Former members ==
- Lars Borg: bass
- Lars Broman: fiddle, viola, acoustic guitar, backing vocals
- Lars Dahlström: bass
- Tobias Edvardson: fiddle, viola, backing vocals
- David Ekh: electric and acoustic guitars, dobro, e-bow, classical guitar
- Øyvind Eriksen: bass
- Kenneth Holmström: bass
- Pär Öjerot: acoustic guitar, mandolin, octave mandolin, backing vocals
- Martin Rydman: guitar, twelve-string guitar

== Discography ==
=== Studio albums ===
- West of Eden (1997)
- Rollercoaster (2001)
- A Stupid Thing to Do (2003)
- Four (2006)
- The West of Eden Travelogue (2009)
- Safe Crossing (2012)
- Songs from Twisting River (2014)
- Look to the West (2016)
- Another Celtic Christmas (2016)
- Flat Earth Society (2019)
- Taube (2021)
- Next Stop Christmas (2022)
- Whitechapel (2024)
- Lighthousekeeping (2026)

=== Live recording ===
- A Celtic Christmas, featuring Róisín Dempsey, Haga motettkör and Valentina Lorenz Cammans (2009)

=== Compilation album ===
- No Time Like The Past (2017)

=== EPs ===
- The Kiss Tribute (2002)
- Cabin Songs (2020)

=== Singles ===
- High Ground, taken from West of Eden (1997)
- The One, taken from Rollercoaster (2001)
- (I Still Remember) How to Forget, taken from Rollercoaster (2001)
- Finders Keepers, taken from A Stupid Thing to Do (2003)
- And The Snow Fell (2007)
- Glenntown (2015)
- Old Miss Partridge (featuring Heidi Talbot & Damien O'Kane), taken from Flat Earth Society (2019)
- Silly Old Beggars (2020)
- Everywhere (Fleetwood Mac cover), taken from Cabin Songs (2020)
- Så skimrande var aldrig havet, taken from Taube (2021)
- Så länge skutan kan gå, taken from Taube (2021)
- Mudlarking, taken from Whitechapel (2024)
- Catch Me When You Can, Mr. Lusk, taken from Whitechapel (2024)
- The Ten Bells, taken from Whitechapel (2024)
- Winter Solstice (2024)
- Sir Patrick Spens, traditional Scottish maritime ballad, taken from the upcoming album Lighthousekeeping (2026)
- Song from Molom/Cooley's Reel, taken from the upcoming album Lighthousekeeping (2026)

=== Jenny & Martin Schaub studio album ===
- Kite High (2004)

=== Martin Schaub studio album ===
- Leaving the Circus (2008)

=== Martin Schaub EP ===
- Pop City (2021)

== Jenny & Martin Schaub musical ==
In 2021, Gothenburg celebrated its 400th anniversary. Martin and Jenny Schaub created a musical, called Silverhjärtats hemlighet ('The Secret of the Silver Heart'), that depicts the city's history and is set in three eras: the 16th century, 1916 and the present day. It featured Timo Räisänen, Maia Hirasawa, José Gonzalez and the Gothenburg Symphony Orchestra.
