= Steph Geremia =

Irish-American flute player and singer

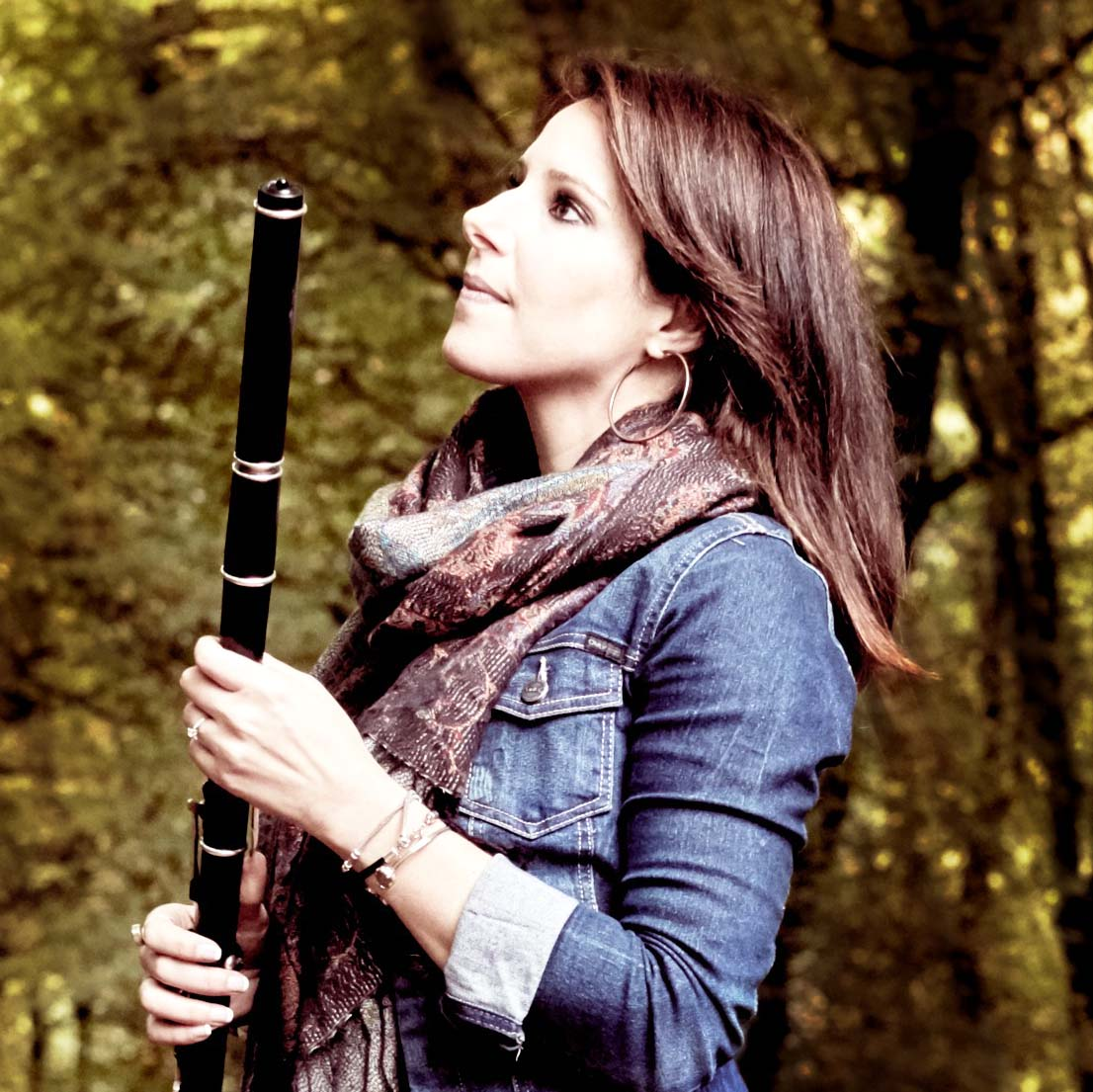
Geremia in 2018

Steph Geremia is an Irish-American flute player and singer who lives in Galway, Ireland.

== Career ==
Steph Geremia was born in an Italian/Irish neighborhood in New York. There she learned to play the Irish flute and first came into contact with traditional Irish music. At age 16 she played in various orchestras. She studied world music and traveled through India. While there, she studied the Bansuri, a north Indian flute. This was followed by a trip in Italy, where she came into contact with Salsa and Jazz music.

She then went to County Sligo, Ireland, where she devoted herself more seriously to studying the Irish flute. She received a master's degree in traditional Irish music at the University of Limerick.

Playing in various groups, she soon became a fixture in the Irish music scene. Today she lives in Galway, where she teaches Irish flute and performs regularly, both nationally and internationally.

In 2008 she took part in the Galway Arts Festival as a solo artist. In September 2009 she joined with Johnny Cunningham to perform in the International Edinburgh Festival. In July of that year she released her debut album, titled The Open Road.

In 2012, she played on five tracks on the album Safe Crossing by the Swedish band West of Eden.

In 2021, she played on the track Möte i monsunen, also by West of Eden.

== Music ==
Among her particularly strong influences Steph Geremia counts Matt Molloy, Kevin Crawford, Planxty, Andy Irvine, and Dolores Keane. Her first album was released in 2009 to high acclaim in the Irish press.

Her flute playing is of the Roscommon/Sligo style, known for its fluidity and purity of tone.

== Reception ==
In December 2009, Geremia played a concert with Alan Kelly, which was called "vibrant, versatile". Irish Music Magazine has called her "one of the most promising young flute players around" and "an unexpected treasure".

== Discography ==
- The Open Road (2009)
- Up She Flew (2018)
