= Year of the Dog (album) =

Studio album by Wolfstone
- Released: 1 July 1994
- Recorded: Palladium Studios, Edinburgh, Scotland
- Genre: Celtic rock
- Length: 46:06
- Label: Green Linnet
- Producer: Phil Cunningham

Wolfstone chronology
The Chase (1992)	Year of the Dog (1994)	The Half Tail (1996)

Professional ratings
Review scores
Source	Rating
Allmusic	3/5 stars

Year of the Dog is the third album by Scottish Celtic rock group Wolfstone. It was released in 1994.

== Track listing ==
1. "Holy Ground" - 3:57
2. "Ballavanich" - 4:45
  - The Boys from Ballavanich
  - Mrs. Crehan's
3. "The Sea King" - 6:03
4. "Brave Foot Soldiers" - 4:50
5. "Double Rise Set" - 5:25
  - Gingerhog's No.2
  - The Double Rise
  - Crossing the Mince
  - Give Us a Drink of Water
6. "White Gown" - 4:26
7. "Morag's Reels" - 5:19
  - Morag's Reel
  - Laura Lynn Cunningham
  - The Harsh February
  - Miss Lyall
8. "Braes of Sutherland" - 7:29
  - Braes of Sutherland
  - The Youngest Ancient Mariner
9. "Dinner's Set" - 4:14
  - Dinner's Dangerous River Jacket
  - Richard Dwyer's Reel
  - Sandy MacLeod of Garafad

== Personnel ==
- Duncan Chisholm: fiddle
- Stuart Eaglesham: acoustic guitar, electric guitar, vocals
- Struan Eaglesham: keyboards
- Ivan Drever: lead vocals, acoustic guitar, bouzouki
- Wayne Mackenzie: bass guitar
- Mop Youngson: drums
- Taj Wyzgowski: electric guitar
- Gordon Duncan: pipes
- Phil Cunningham: accordion, whistle
