= Tønder Festival =

Folk music festival in Tønder, Denmark, established 1975

Tønder Festival is an annual folk music festival in Tønder, Denmark. It is held on the last weekend of August. It was founded in 1974. The first festival took place in 1975.

The festival is one of the most prominent festivals for traditional and modern folk music in Europe. Around 2500 volunteers helps create the festival every year. The program is composed of international artists from especially Ireland, Scotland, Canada, United States, England & Scandinavia. The genres vary from Irish and Scottish folk music to Nordic Folk Music, Americana, Country and world.

The festival takes place at the festival area, with room for up to 15,000 people.

Amongst the artists who have visited the festival are John Prine, Emmylou Harris, John McCutcheon,Steve Earle, Jason Isbell, Sturgill Simpson, Colter Wall, Pete Seeger, Arlo Guthrie, Runrig, Lukas Graham, Great Big Sea, The Chieftains, Altan, Eivør Pálsdóttir, Ramblin' Jack Elliott, Donovan, Natalie MacMaster, Wolfstone, Mary Black, Margo Price, Capercaillie, Karan Casey, Jacob Dinesen, The Lone Bellow, Darlingside, The Avett Brothers, Red Hot Chili Pipers and Marck Cohn, The Mavericks.

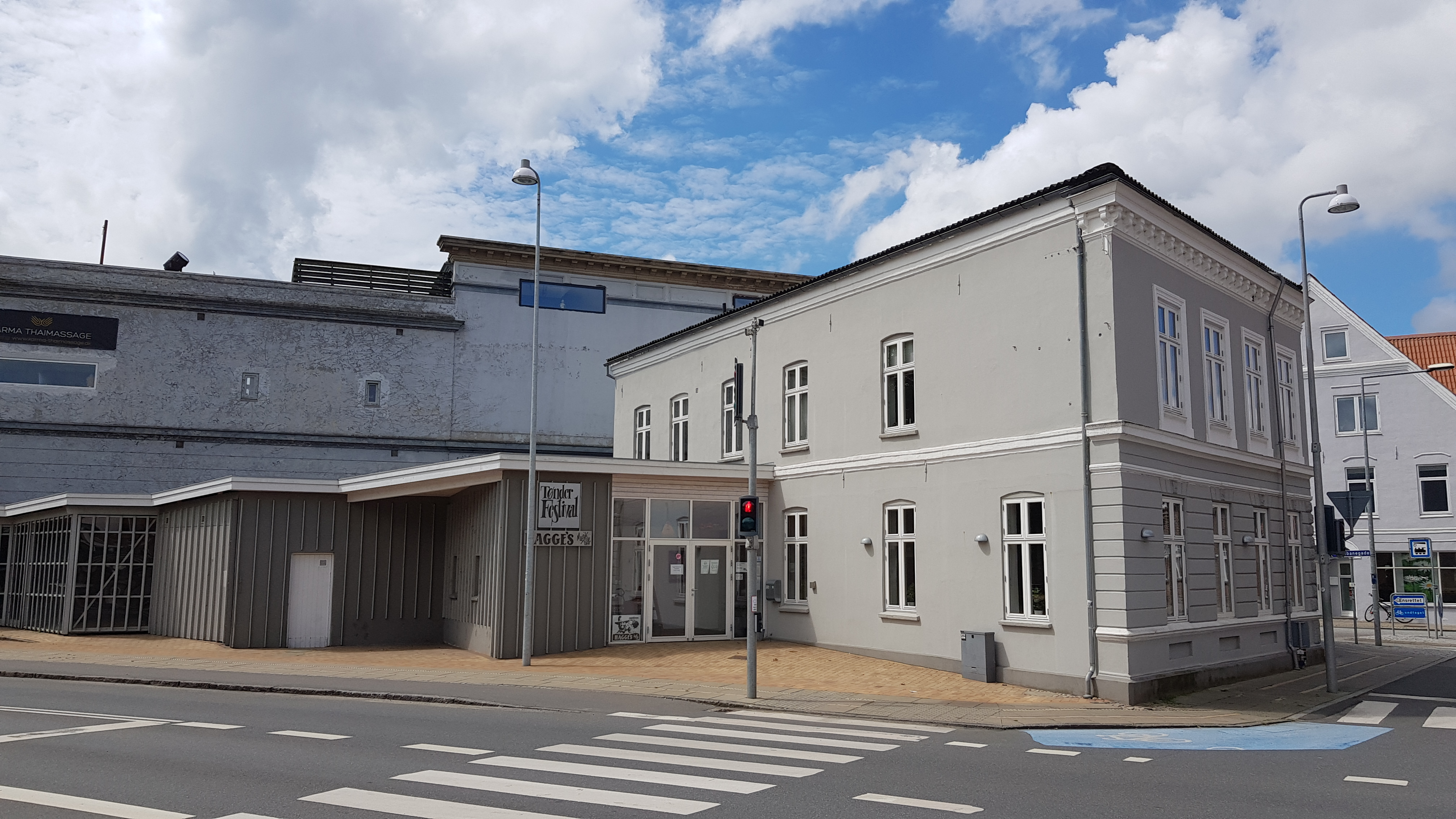
Hagge's Music Pub with the festival offices

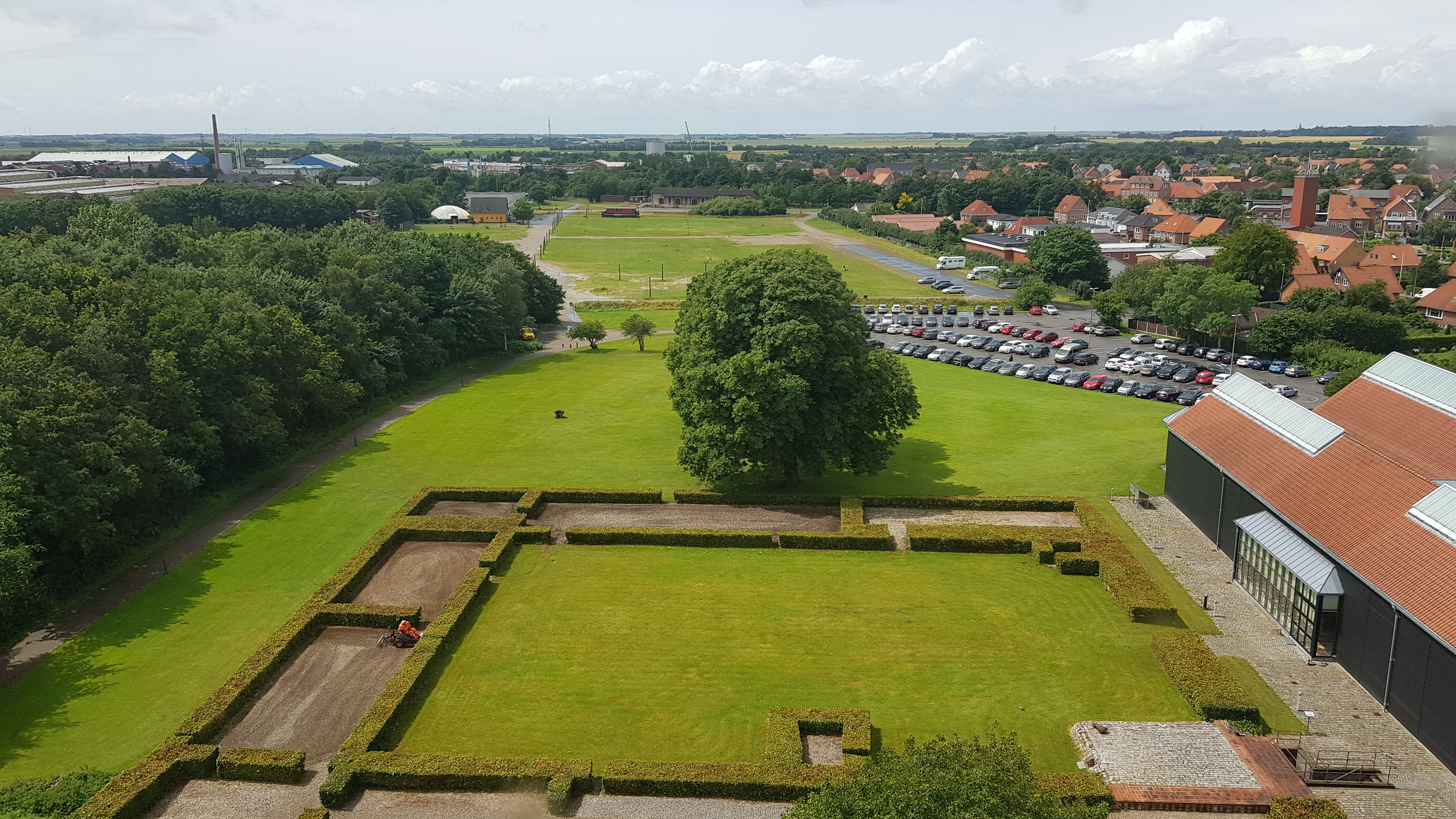
View to the festival grounds from the old watertower
