= Gordon Duncan =

Scottish musician (1964–2005)

- Born: 14 May 1964; Turriff, Aberdeenshire, Scotland
- Died: 14 December 2005 (aged 41) Pitlochry, Perthshire, Scotland
- Occupations: Musician, composer
- Instruments: Bagpipes, low whistle

Gordon Duncan (14 May 1964 – 14 December 2005) was a Scottish bagpiper, low whistle player and composer.

== Early life ==
Duncan was born in Turriff, Aberdeenshire on 14 May 1964. His parents were tenant farmer and bothy ballad singer Jock Duncan and Frances Duncan. Jock Duncan joined the North of Scotland Hydro-Electric Board shortly after Duncan's birth and the family moved to Thurso then to Pitlochry. Initially taught by his father, Gordon began his piping career at the age of 10, winning many junior competitions under the tuition of Walter Drysdale, but started to lose interest in competition piping by the age of 18, at which point he was an apprentice joiner.

== Career ==
He attracted attention from folk bands, touring the US and Europe with the Tannahill Weavers, Wolfstone and Ceolbeg and became associated with Dougie MacLean, playing low whistle on his albums. He began composing soon afterwards, having travelled across Europe and been exposed to other traditions, especially Breton music.

He was a very influential piper who broke the boundaries of traditional piping music. He was a member of the Vale of Atholl Pipe Band and also performed with the Atholl Highlanders, as well as being signed by Greentrax as a solo artist. Duncan also taught pipers Ross Ainslie and Ali Hutton, who have gone on to have musical careers with some acclaim.

Duncan created a new style of idiosyncratic bagpipe music. He also incorporated the bagpipes into a rendition of AC/DC's Thunderstruck. His work was heard at T in the Park, Celtic Connections, Celtic Colours in Canada, the Lorient festival in Brittany, where he was the two-time winner of the MacAllan Trophy and the Fleadh Cheoil in Ireland.

He worked as a refuse collector and was known to scribble compositions on cigarette packets whilst at work.

== Compositions ==
Duncan composed over one hundred tunes in his lifetime, with perhaps his most famous work, Andy Renwick's Ferret, being performed and recorded internationally.

He arranged music for the Vale of Atholl and ScottishPower pipe bands.

== Death ==
On 14 December 2005, Duncan was found dead at his home in Perthshire following a long struggle with alcoholism. His funeral was held at Pitlochry Church of Scotland and was attended by hundreds of pipers. In his memory, the Gordon Duncan Memorial Trust was set up early in 2006 to support good causes in piping.

In 2007, A National Treasure concert was staged in Perth by the Trust, and for the following four years, with the BBC airing the 2011 concert. In January 2016, a gig was at the Glasgow Royal Concert Hall as part of Celtic Connections.

== Personal life ==
He had a wife, Mary, and a son, Gordon, two sisters, and his brother, Ian Duncan, is also a piper.

== Discography ==
He recorded three solo albums, and a further album was compiled after his death from previously recorded material.

- Just for Seumas (1994)
- Circular Breath (1997)
- Thunderstruck (2003)
- Just for Gordon (2007)
