= Jarlath Henderson =

Northern Irish folk musician

- Born: 1986 (age 39–40); Armagh, Northern Ireland
- Genres: Folk
- Occupations: Musician, singer
- Instrument: Uilleann pipes
- Member of: Atlantic Arc

Jarlath Henderson (born 1986) is a Northern Irish folk musician. He is best known as an Uilleann piper and singer but also plays the guitar and flute. He was the youngest winner of the BBC Radio 2 Young Folk Award in 2003. Through his career, he has worked with bands and musicians such as Lau, Capercaillie, Julie Fowlis, Michael McGoldrick, Paddy Keenan, Salsa Celtica, Phil Cunningham, Buille, Dougie Maclean and Jack Bruce. He has also worked with Boris Grebenshikov of Aquarium on the album House of All Saints. In 2016, he released his first solo album, Hearts Broken, Heads Turned. In 2019, he released Raw and played on several tracks on Flat Earth Society, an album by the Swedish folk rock band West of Eden. As of 2016 he is a member of the band Atlantic Arc, led by Dónal Lunny.

Henderson was born in Armagh but grew up in Dungannon. He studied medicine at the University of Aberdeen before moving to Glasgow to work as a junior doctor. Henderson works full time as both a musician and a doctor. Jarlath Henderson is the brother of the Northern Irish musician and actress Alana Henderson.
