= Almost an Island =

Studio album by Wolfstone
- Released: 24 September 2002
- Recorded: CAP Studios, Crask of Aigas, Beauly
- Genre: Celtic rock
- Length: 44:03
- Label: Once Bitten Records
- Producer: Brian McNeill

Wolfstone chronology
Seven (1999)	Almost an Island (2002)	Terra Firma (2007)

Professional ratings
Review scores
Source	Rating
The Scotsman	favourable
The Living Tradition	favourable
FolkWorld	favourable
Allmusic	3/5 stars

Almost an Island is the seventh album by Scottish Celtic rock group Wolfstone, released in 2002. It was their first studio album to be released on their own label, Once Bitten Records.

== Reception ==
Calling the album "howling good", The Washington Post commended "Wolfstone's often-exhilirating fusion rock" for its "amusing juxtaposition of bagpipes and wah-wah guitar", as well as its use of "rock rhythms to put an emphatic spin on music firmly rooted in Celtic traditions".

== Track listing ==
1. "The Piper and the Shrew" (Leo McCann) – 3:32
2. "Elav the Terrible" (R.S. McDonald) – 3:27
3. "Where the Summers Go" (Duncan Chisholm/Stuart Eaglesham) – 4:07
4. "La Grande Nuit du Port de Peche" (Martin Hughes) – 4:11
5. "The Queen of Argyll" – 4:20
  - The Queen of Argyll (Andy M. Stewart)
  - The Knockard Elf (Stevie Saint)
6. "5/4 Madness" (Phil Cunningham) – 5:01
7. "Davie's Last Reel" (Saint) – 3:22
8. "Jericho" (Chisholm/Eaglesham) – 4:10
9. "All Our Dreams" (Iain MacDonald) – 6:39
10. "The Panda" (Gordon Duncan) – 5:14
  - The Panda
  - The Soup Dragon

== Personnel ==
- Duncan Chisholm – fiddle, backing vocals
- Wayne Mackenzie – bass guitar, backing vocals
- Stevie Saint – pipes, whistles
- Stuart Eaglesham – guitars, vocals
- Alyn Cosker – drums
- Phil Cunningham – keyboards, accordion, backing vocals
- Cous-cous MacAfferty – cittern
- Brian McNeill – tambourine
