= Wolfstone =

Scottish Celtic rock band

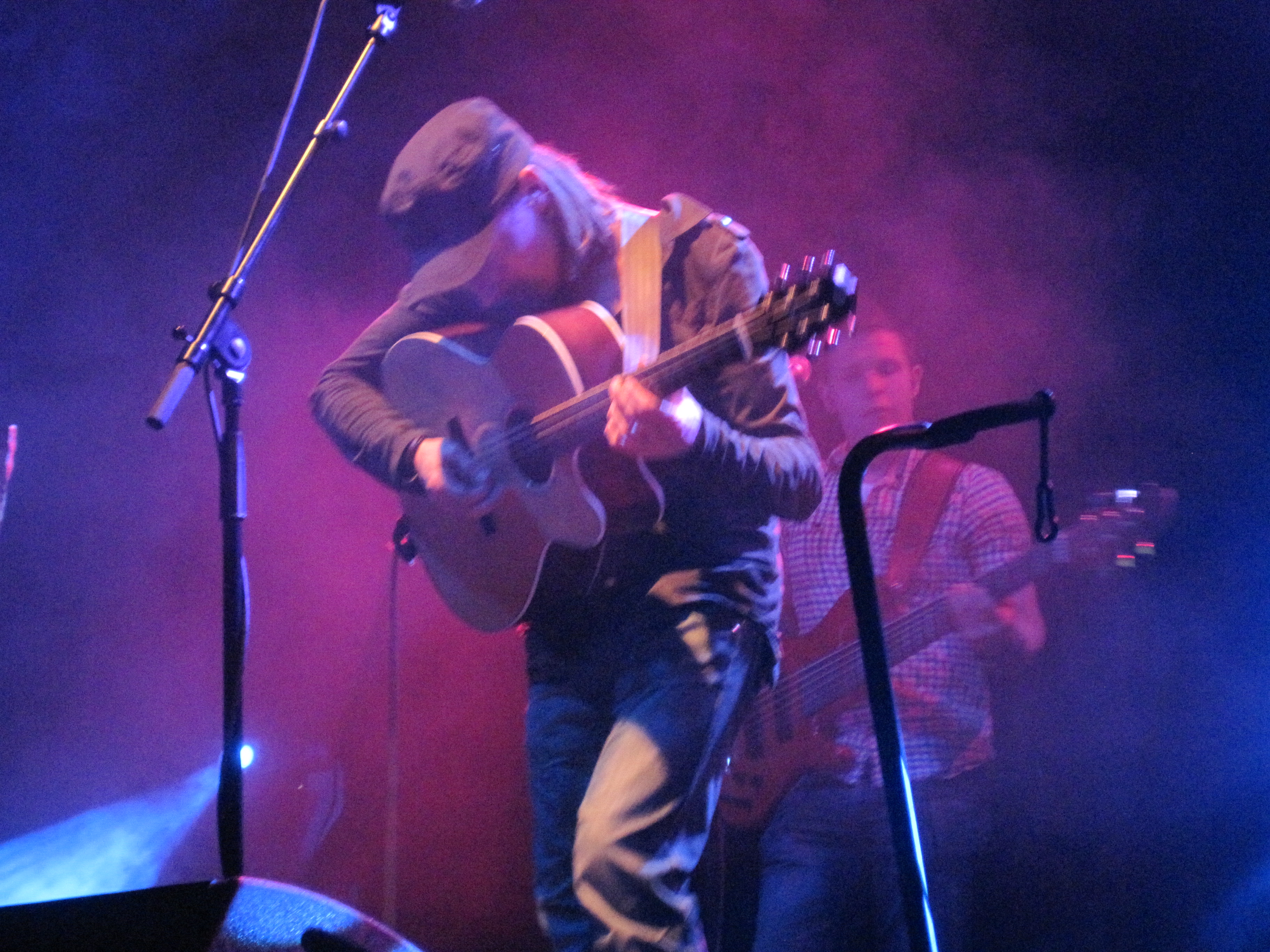
- Stuart Eaglesham (left) and Colin Cunningham (right) at the Ironworks, Inverness, 19 March 2011

Background information
- Origin: Inverness, Scotland
- Genres: Celtic rock
- Years active: 1989–present (1989–1997, 1998–present)
- Labels: Iona Records, Green Linnet Records, Once Bitten Records
- Members: Duncan Chisholm; Stuart Eaglesham; Stevie Saint; Alyn Cosker; Colin Cunningham; Davie Dunsmuir
- Past members: Andy Murray; Andy Simmers; Andy Thorburn; Allan Wilson; David Foster; Graeme Youngson; Ivan Drever; Roger Niven; Ronny Watson; Ross Hamilton; Struan Eaglesham; Tony Soave; Wayne Mackenzie
- Website: wolfstone.co.uk

Wolfstone are a Scottish musical group founded in 1989, who play Celtic rock. Their repertoire consists of both original songs and traditional folk pieces. They have released seven studio albums, the latest, Terra Firma, in 2007. The band record on their own label, Once Bitten Records. The group are named after the "Wolfstone", a Pictish stone originally sited at Ardross, Easter Ross, close to where the band initially recorded.

== History ==
=== Formation (1989–1991) ===
The roots of Wolfstone go back to when fiddler Duncan Chisholm met guitarist Stuart Eaglesham at a pub session. An idea becoming realised, Stuart's brother and keyboard player, Struan Eaglesham, was offered a place in the line-up, as was piper Allan Wilson from Bonar Bridge. Roger Niven from the Black Isle played guitar, but was soon replaced by Andy Murray. In 1989, Wolfstone performed their opening show at the first Highland Traditional Music Festival in Dingwall, supplemented by sequenced bass and drums. Following this, the band ran the usual Highlands and Islands village dance hall circuit, gaining live experience. It was clear that this was a worthwhile venture, the gigs earning them more than their day jobs. During this period, Wolfstone recorded two albums—Wolfstone and Wolfstone II respectively—on Rowan Records, utilising sequencing machines over a standard rhythm section. These albums were produced by David Foster, who also contributed vocals to some of the tracks. However, he parted ways with Wolfstone in 1990 over disagreement on the band's direction. Also in 1990, Orcadian Ivan Drever joined the band on vocals, guitars, and songwriting duties. Soon, Wolfstone were offered a recording contract with Iona Records in Glasgow, and in 1991, began work on Unleashed, allowing them to guest drummer John Henderson and bassist Neil Hay for a decidedly more authentic sound. Mid-process, they were offered a support slot at Runrig's major Loch Lomond Midsummer event, alongside such acts as Capercaillie and Hothouse Flowers. This exposure brought the band larger gigs and shows, playing to new audiences. Ultimately, Unleashed was a success, achieving silver status in the UK.

=== Mainstream success (1992–1996) ===
1992 saw Wolfstone enter the studio once again to record their follow-up album, The Chase. By this time, piper Allan Wilson had left the band, and his position was filled for several years by a string of different session musicians, including Roddy McCourt, Dougie Pincock, Gordon Duncan and Martyn Bennett. The Chase proved a success, achieving gold status. The band were once again made busy touring, with the addition of TV appearances, for example the 1993 edition of Children in Need. An EP entitled Burning Horizons was released in 1993, consolidating bassist Wayne Mackenzie and drummer Mop Youngson as full-time members. In 1994, Wolfstone signed to Green Linnet Records, which consequently saw the release of Year of the Dog. About this time, the Celtic Records label reissued the band's early albums, Wolfstone and Wolfstone II. Duncan Chisholm says: "We disown those two albums. The band we are in does not reflect what was going on then; a different line up with different ideas and objectives; anyone buying those two albums is not buying a Wolfstone recording. We would never promote them and we certainly wouldn't sell them to anyone." Despite this, the first of these albums received a positive reception from AllMusic. In late 1994, the position of piper was finally consolidated when Stevie Saint joined the band full-time. He has remained in the line-up ever since. In 1996, Wolfstone released their fourth album, The Half Tail.

=== Contractual obligations and reinvention (late 1996–2000) ===
Mop Youngson left the band in late 1996 owing to exhaustion derived from constant touring. He was replaced by session drummer Ronny Watson. Keyboard player Struan Eaglesham also left the band at this time. He was replaced by Andy Thorburn. Wolfstone continued to tour in 1997–1998 following the release of their Half Tail album. In 1997, a best-of compilation album, assembled by the band's former label Iona Records, was released in partnership with Green Linnet.

Technically, Wolfstone were disbanded towards the end of 1998, but the band were obliged to return to the studio to fulfill their recording contract. Joined by Andy Simmers on keys, and Tony Soave on drums, they recorded in the winter of 1998/1999, producing Seven. Wolfstone toured for the majority of 2000, but were struck by the death of Andy Simmers. The band made the decision to continue, and also set up their own label, namely Once Bitten Records. On this, the band released their first and so far only live album Not Enough Shouting.

=== Recent years (2002–present) ===
In 2002, Wolfstone returned to the fold to record another album, which had an altogether rockier feel. This was Almost an Island. Sometime after this, the band experienced a brief hiatus to allow members to relax from the strains of touring. Alyn Cosker, session drummer on the album, joined the band full-time, whilst long-time bassist Wayne Mackenzie left the group. In 2003, Ross Hamilton joined Wolfstone on various guitar duties, but eventually began to share vocals with Stuart Eaglesham. 2004 saw the band reach America once again, playing at a variety of festivals. The intervening years saw Dundonian Colin Cunningham join the band on bass guitar. In early 2007, Wolfstone released Terra Firma with a launch party at the Ironworks venue in Inverness, with Ross Hamilton assuming full vocal duties on the album. However, he departed just a few months after this. This meant that by the time Wolfstone supported Runrig at their 'Beat the Drum' concert at Drumnadrochit on the banks of Loch Ness, Stuart Eaglesham had returned to lead vocals. Later that year, Davie Dunsmuir joined the band as lead guitarist. In 2010, the band celebrated their 21st anniversary at the Festival Theatre in Pitlochry. 2011 saw further touring across Europe, and an overhaul of the official website. Stuart Eaglesham released a video interview in July, which stated that Wolfstone were in the studio recording new tracks. The band hoped to release an EP or full album late 2011 or early 2012, and eventually an EP was released in March 2012 containing two tracks.

== Music ==
Wolfstone perform pieces from the traditional folk and Celtic repertoire permeated with rock and roll sensibilities. This was perhaps most obvious on the early Wolfstone and Wolfstone II albums which featured prominent walking bass-lines. As well as this, the band is also a source of both original tunes and songs. Previous material stemmed, though not exclusively, from collaborations between Ivan Drever and Duncan Chisholm, as well as Drever's own compositions. Only more recently have Duncan Chisholm and Stuart Eaglesham written songs together. Wolfstone's songs vary greatly in subject matter. They explore emigration and displacement ("Burning Horizons", "Braes of Sutherland"), social injustice ("Close It Down", "Brave Foot Soldiers") and conflict ("White Gown", "Brave Boys"), amongst other things. They have also recorded several traditional songs which happen to work well in a rock setting

== Membership ==
=== Current members ===
- Duncan Chisholm – fiddle (1989–present)
- Stuart Eaglesham – lead vocals, acoustic guitar (1989–present)
- Stevie Saint – pipes, whistles (1994–present)
- Colin Cunningham – bass guitar, (2007–present)
- Davie Dunsmuir – lead guitar (2010–present)
- Allan James - drums (2010-present)

=== Former members ===
- Struan Eaglesham – keyboards (1989–1996)
- Roger Niven – guitar (1989)
- David Foster – vocals, bass and drum sequencing (1989–1990)
- Andy Murray – lead guitar (1989–1993)
- Ivan Drever – lead vocals, guitar, cittern (1990–1998)
- Wayne Mackenzie – bass guitar (1992–2003)
- Graeme "Mop" Youngson – drums (1992–1996)
- Andy Thorburn – keyboards (1996–1997)
- Andy Simmers – keyboards (1998–2000)
- Ronny Watson – drums (1996–1998)
- Tony Soave – drums (1998–2002)
- Ross Hamilton – vocals, guitars, programming (2003–2007)
- Alyn Cosker – drums, keyboards (2002–2007, 2010)

=== Former session musicians ===
- John Henderson – drums
- Neil Hay – bass guitar
- Dougie Pincock – pipes, whistles
- Roddy McCourt – pipes, whistles
- Gary West – pipes
- Gordon Duncan – pipes, whistles
- Martyn Bennett – pipes, whistles
- Kenny Forsyth – pipes, whistles
- Fraser Fifield – pipes, whistles
- Paul Jennings – drums
- Bryden Stillie – drums

== Discography ==
=== Studio albums ===
- Unleashed (1991)
- The Chase (1992)
- Year of the Dog (1994)
- The Half Tail (1996)
- Seven (1999)
- Almost an Island (2002)
- Terra Firma (2007)

=== EPs ===
- Unleashed: The Preview (1991)
- Burning Horizons (1993)
- 'Time for Walking' & 'Back of Beyond' (2012)

=== Live albums ===
- Not Enough Shouting (2000)

=== Video releases ===
- Captured Alive (1992)

=== Associated releases ===
- Wolfstone (1989)
- Wolfstone II (1990)
- This Strange Place (1998)

=== Compilations ===
- The Rough Guide to Scottish Music (1996)
- Pick of the Litter (1997)

== Related albums ==
- The Lewis Blue (1998) (An album by Duncan Chisholm and Ivan Drever, lead members of Wolfstone at the time of release)
- The Best Scottish Album in the World...Ever! (1997) (A compilation album featuring the Wolfstone performance of "Battle")
- A Thistle and Shamrock Christmas Ceilidh (2000) (Compilation album appearance with the song "Ballavanich")
