= The Chase (Wolfstone album) =

Studio album by Wolfstone
- Released: 1992
- Recorded: Palladium Studios, Edinburgh, Scotland
- Genre: Celtic rock
- Length: 46:42
- Label: Iona
- Producer: Phil Cunningham

Wolfstone chronology
Unleashed (1991)	The Chase (1992)	Year of the Dog (1994)

Professional ratings
Review scores
Source	Rating
Allmusic	4/5 stars

The Chase is the second album by Scottish Celtic rock group Wolfstone. It was released in 1992.

== Track listing ==
1. "Tinnie Run" - 3:44
  - The Road to Mount Tinnie Run
  - The Boys of Ballymoat
  - Alan MacPherson of Mosspark
2. "Glass and the Can" - 4:37
3. "The Prophet" - 3:47
4. "The Appropriate Dipstick" - 4:19
  - Lori Connor
  - The Appropriate Dipstick
  - John Keith Laing
5. "Flames and Hearts" - 5:03
6. "The £10 Float" - 5:16
  - Kinnaird House
  - The £10 Float
  - The Cottage in the Grove
7. "Close It Down" - 4:38
  - Close It Down
  - Duncan Johnstone
8. "Jake's Tune" - 4:34
9. "The Early Mist" - 4:19
10. "Cannot Lay Me Down" - 6:27
  - Cannot Lay Me Down
  - The Lady of Ardross

== Personnel ==
- Duncan Chisholm: fiddle
- Stuart Eaglesham: guitar, vocals
- Struan Eaglesham: keyboards
- Ivan Drever: guitar, lead vocals
- Andy Murray: electric guitar

=== Additional musicians ===
- Neil Hay: bass guitar
- John Henderson: drums
- Dougie Pincock: pipes, whistle, flute
- Phil Cunningham: accordion
