= Duncan Chisholm =

- Born: 31 October 1968 (age 57); Inverness, Scotland
- Genres: Folk, folk rock
- Occupation: Musician
- Instrument: Fiddle
- Years active: 1980s-present
- Website: duncanchisholm.com

Duncan Chisholm (born 31 October 1968) is a Scottish fiddle player and composer. He has released seven solo albums as a solo artist. His studio album, Affric, released in 2012, was longlisted for the Scottish Album of the Year (SAY) Award. In 2022, he released a seventh studio album, titled Black Cuillin. He tours with the Scottish Gaelic singer Julie Fowlis's band. He is also a founder member of the folk rock group Wolfstone. He played fiddle for Runrig.

== Discography ==
=== Solo ===
- Redpoint (1997)
- The Door of Saints (2001)
- Farrar (2008)
- Canaich (2010)
- Affric (2012)
- Live at Celtic Connections (2013)
- Sandwood (2018)
- Black Cuillin (2022)

=== with Wolfstone ===
- Unleashed (1991)
- The Chase (1992)
- Year of the Dog (1994)
- The Half Tail (1996)
- Pick of the Litter (1997)
- Seven (1999)
- Not Enough Shouting (2000)
- Almost an Island (2002)
- Terra Firma (2007)

=== Guest appearances ===
- Across the City and the World – Donnie Munro (2002)
- Proterra – Runrig (2003)
- Day of Days – Runrig (2004)
- Heart of America – Donnie Munro (2006)
- Everything You See – Runrig (2007)
- Uam – Julie Fowlis (2009)
- The Beat of You – Coast (2010)
- Live at Perthshire Amber – Julie Fowlis (2011)
- Uncovered – Beth Nielsen Chapman (2013)
- Party on the Moor – Runrig (2014)
- Gach Sgeul – Julie Fowlis (2014)
- Alterum – Julie Fowlis (2017)
- Flat Earth Society (on the track Isak) – West of Eden (2019)

== Awards ==
- MG Alba Scots Trad Music Awards – Album of the Year 2008 – Farrar
- Herald Angel – Edinburgh Festival – for multi-media production Kin
- Scots Trad Music Awards – Musician of the Year 2012
- Scots Trad Music Awards – Album of the Year 2014 – Live at Celtic Connections
- Scots Trad Music Awards – Album of the Year 2018 – 'Sandwood'
