= Pick of the Litter (Wolfstone album) =

Pick of the Litter: The Best of Wolfstone 1991–1996

Greatest hits album by Wolfstone
- Released: 12 August 1997
- Recorded: 1991–1996
- Genre: Celtic rock
- Length: 67:55
- Label: Iona Records (released in association with Green Linnet)

Wolfstone chronology
The Half Tail (1996)	Pick of the Litter: The Best of Wolfstone 1991–1996 (1997)	This Strange Place (1998)

Professional ratings
Review scores
Source	Rating
Allmusic	4/5 stars

Pick of the Litter is a best-of compilation album by the Scottish Celtic rock group Wolfstone. It was released in 1997.

== Track listing ==
1. "Battle" - 3:30
  1. The Battle of the Somme
  2. The Bugle Horn
  3. The Atholl Highlanders
2. "Tall Ships" - 4:54
3. "Glass and the Can" - 4:31
4. "Cleveland Park" - 4:09
  1. Cleveland Park
  2. The Banks of the Allan
  3. Kenny Gillies of Portnalong, Skye
5. "Heart and Soul" - 3:15
6. "The Howl" - 7:27
  1. The Louis Reel
  2. Morrison's Jig
  3. The Shoe Polisher's Jig
7. "White Gown" - 4:20
8. "Glenglass" - 5:26
9. "Brave Foot Soldiers" - 4:46
10. "Dinner's Set" - 4:13
  1. Dinner's Dangerous River Jacket
  2. Richard Dwyer's Reel
  3. Sandy MacLeod of Garafad
11. "Sleepy Toon" - 3:47
12. "The £10 Float" - 5:10
  1. Kinnaird House
  2. The £10 Float
  3. The Cottage in the Grove
13. "Holy Ground" - 3:49
14. "Clueless" - 3:56
  1. Clueless
  2. Fleshmarket Close
  3. The Steampacket
15. "No Tie Ups" - 4:07
