= The Half Tail =

Studio album by Wolfstone
- Released: 26 August 1996
- Recorded: CaVa Studios, Glasgow, Scotland
- Genre: Celtic rock
- Length: 42:15
- Label: Green Linnet
- Producer: Chris Harley

Wolfstone chronology
Year of the Dog (1994)	The Half Tail (1996)	Seven (1999)

Professional ratings
Review scores
Source	Rating
Allmusic	4/5 stars

The Half Tail is the fourth album by Scottish Celtic rock group Wolfstone.

Released in August 1996, first in limited quantities on 6 August, followed by a wider release on 26 August. A promo poster for 26 August was distributed.

Reviews were positive for the album.

== Track listing ==
1. "Zeto" - 4:13
  - Zeto the Bubbleman
  - Electric Chopsticks
2. "Tall Ships" - 4:56
3. "Gillies" - 6:42
  - The Sleeping Tune
  - The Noose and the Gillies
4. "Heart and Soul" - 3:17
5. "Granny Hogg's Enormous Wallet" - 3:43
  - Duncan Chisholm
  - Granny Hogg's Enormous Wallet
6. "Bonnie Ship the Diamond" - 5:54
  - Bonnie Ship the Diamond
  - The Last Leviathan
7. "Glenglass" - 5:26
8. "Clueless" - 3:57
  - Clueless
  - Fleshmarket Close
  - The Steampacket
9. "No Tie Ups" - 4:07

== Personnel ==
- Duncan Chisholm: fiddle
- Stuart Eaglesham: acoustic guitar, electric guitar, vocals, whistle
- Struan Eaglesham: keyboards
- Ivan Drever: lead vocals, acoustic guitar, electric guitar, bouzouki
- Wayne Mackenzie: bass guitar
- Mop Youngson: drums
- Stevie Saint: pipes
- Iain Macdonald: flute
- Sandro Ciancio: percussion
- Fraser Spiers: harmonica
