= Strathspey Camanachd =

Strathspey
- Full name: Strathspey Camanachd Club
- Gaelic name: Comann Camanachd Shrath Spè
- Nickname: Strath Cam
- Founded: 2011
- Ground: Grantown Grammar School
- Manager: Peter Tinney
- League: North Division Two
- 2018: 6th
Home

Strathspey Camanachd is a shinty club based in Grantown-on-Spey, Strathspey, Scotland, currently competing in the Marine Harvest North Division Two.

Founded in 2011 the club was admitted into senior league shinty for the beginning of the 2012 season.

== History of Shinty in Strathspey ==
During the late nineteenth century twelve shinty clubs from across the Badenoch and Strathspey area were in operation indicating the importance the sport played for the local communities of that time. Grantown-on-Spey formed the first shinty club in Strathspey in 1892 followed over the next few years by clubs formed in Nethy Bridge (1893), Boat of Garten (1893), Carrbridge (1893), Dulnain Bridge (1894) and Aviemore (1900).

With player numbers dwindling over the passing decades for the Strathspey-based clubs, shinty remained much stronger in nearby Badenoch where Kingussie Camanachd and bitter rivals Newtonmore Camanachd Club would begin their local dominance. For the Strathspey teams, regular periods of hiatus became the norm.

Although success was less profound in Strathspey it was not completely absent of accomplishment. Duthil-Carrbridge winning the Strathdearn Cup in 1914 followed by Grantown Camanachd Club (locally referred to as the Grantown Butchers) winning the same trophy in 1921, beating Glenurquhart Shinty Club 7–1 in the final.

With an increased popularity in football, and the outbreak of World War II, by the 1940s no Shinty club in Strathspey continued operation. Kincraig Camanachd, of Badenoch, and Loch Ness based Boleskine Camanachd would benefit from exiled Strathspey based players.

== History of Strathspey Camanachd ==
In 2011 a group of local enthusiasts established a senior club based in Grantown-on-Spey, Strathspey, Scotland with the club entering the Camanachd Association-sanctioned Development League North the very same year. Strathspey played their first match against Ardnamurchan Camanachd on 12 February 2011 before a run of further friendlies. Finishing first in the Development League Strath Cam gave way to a final-game defeat to Kinlochbervie Camanachd Club.

The club successfully applied and were accepted in to the Marine Harvest North Division Three for the 2012 season. This was to mark the first competitive shinty to be played in Strathspey in over 60 years. The club's first competitive game was a 3–1 defeat by Strathglass Shinty Club on 3 March 2012. That season the club would record five victories and two draws, including a 6–6 home draw against Lewis Camanachd, finishing 7th overall.

The 2013 season saw the club enter the Sir William Sutherland Cup for the first time where they were defeated by Glengarry Shinty Club. In the league, Strathspey were to be edged out of 6th place on goal difference by Lochbroom Camanachd to finish 7th for the second consecutive year.

On 19 October 2013, "Strath Cam" partook in its first ever under-17 match against Kingussie Camanachd on The Dell (Kingussie), marking the first time in history an age grade team had represented a club from Strathspey. On 26 October, the club fielded an under-17 team in the WJ Cameron Trophy development trophy against Inverness Shinty Club, Ballachulish Camanachd Club and Ardnamurchan Camanachd, eventually finishing in 3rd place.

2014 witnessed the club progress, finishing 3rd in the league. The club entered the Strathdearn Cup for the first time where they reached the semi-final before losing out 4–3 to Skye Camanachd. The club's progression was reflected with Andrew Hay, a rookie to the sport in 2011, being awarded the Marine Harvest Player of the Year Award for North Division Three.

Due to a small number of teams in the league a split was proposed by Strathspey, however this had a negative consequence, with the club required to travel to Lewis twice on league duty along with two away fixtures in cup competitions. Despite beating Lewis Camanachd 6–0 in the cup, the club were unable to raise a team for both league fixtures resulting in multiple forfeits.

2015 saw Strathspey start the league in a strong fashion but ultimately finished bottom of the league.

== Strathspey Camanachd Ladies ==
In March 2014, Strath Cam began the foundations of forming a women's shinty team. With a lot of help from former Badenoch and Strathspey Ladies Shinty Club and Scotland International Jane Nicol, the sport generated a lot of interested with women in the local community.

Strathspey Camanachd Ladies have entered the Women's Camanachd Association league structure for the 2015 and will play Strathglass Shinty Club in their first fixture in March 2015.

== Ground ==
In late 2011 the club secured Freuchie Park as its home ground. Located in the vicinity of Castle Grant – so named as it stood on the site of the original village which would become Grantown - at that time called 'Castleton of Freuchie'.

Controversy surrounded the club in December 2011 as the Press and Journal erroneously reported that Strathspey had been given use of the ground by Craig Whyte, then chairman of Rangers F.C., who owns Castle Grant. This, however, was false, as the park had been granted use by a local farmer.

The club used Freuchie Park for the duration of the 2012 and 2013 seasons.

On 6 January 2014 it was announced that Strathspey would be moving away from Freuchie Park and playing their home matches at Grantown Grammar School. The first shinty match held at GGS was a friendly against Newtonmore Camanachd Club on 22 February 2014. The visitors winning 6–2.

With the club unable to train at GGS they use an all weather facility, located in Aviemore, during the winter months, with summer training held at the Boat of Garten football pitch.

== Season by Season record ==
*North Div 3 became tier 5 on the pyramid after the reinstatement of the National Division. North Div 3 would fold after the 2014 season. Automatic entry into North Div 2 (tier 4)

Season	League	Tier	Teams	Position	Camanachd Cup	MacTavish Cup	Macaulay Cup	Sutherland Cup	Strathdearn Cup
2012	North Div 3	4	10	7th	DNP	DNP	DNP	DNP	DNP
2013	North Div 3	4	10	7th	DNP	DNP	DNP	Round 1	DNP
2014	North Div 3	5	6	4th	DNP	DNP	DNP	Round 2	Semi-Final
2015	North Div 2	4	10	10th	DNP	DNP	DNP	DNP	Round 2
2016	North Div 2	4	10	10th	DNP	DNP	DNP	DNP	DNP
2017	North Div 2	4	11	5th	DNP	DNP	DNP	DNP	DNP
2018	North Div 2	4	11		DNP	DNP	DNP	Round 1	Round 2
