= Strathdearn Cup =

Knock-out competition in the sport of shinty

The Strathdearn Cup is a knock-out competition in the sport of shinty. The present holders are Newtonmore.

It is played for by reserve-level teams from the North of Scotland, that is all teams playing in North Division Two and Three as well as non-league teams.

It was first played for in 1911 and was originally administered by the Strathdearn Camanachd Association but it is now run under the auspices of the Camanachd Association. There is also a Strathdearn Six a-side Trophy for players at Under-17 level.

As of 2010, the opening rounds of the cup were played midweek, in order to reduce the backlog of fixtures that regularly afflicted shinty. This experiment did not last the season.

In 2014, a Strathdearn Plate was introduced for teams knocked out in the first round of the competition.

In 2021, the competition saw one of the greatest comebacks in the sports history when Lovat turned round a 4-0 deficit in extra time of the final to finish 4-4. Lovat went on to win the trophy on penalties.

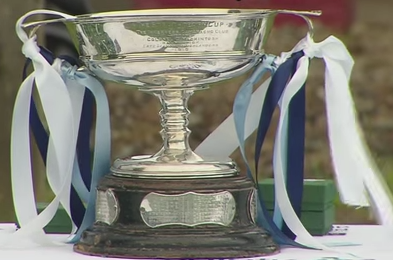
The Strathdearn Cup, shinty trophy for North Junior/Reserve shinty

== Winners ==
- 2022 Newtonmore 7, Lovat 1
- 2021 Lovat 4, Newtonmore 4 AET, Lovat won on Penalties
- 2019 Fort William 4, Newtonmore 0
- 2018 Newtonmore 4, Fort William 0
- 2017 Kingussie 4, Newtonmore 2
- 2016 Lochcarron 4, Glenurquhart 1
- 2015 Newtonmore 3, Glengarry 1
- 2014 Newtonmore 3, Skye 2
- 2013 Lovat
- 2012 Beauly
- 2011 Newtonmore
- 2010 Glenurquhart
- 2009 Fort William
- 2008 Fort William
- 2007 Kilmallie
- 2006 Newtonmore
- 2005 Newtonmore
- 2004 Kilmallie
- 2003 Newtonmore
- 2002 Glenurquhart
- 2001 Kingussie
- 2000 Skye Camanachd
- 1999 Newtonmore
- 1998 Glengarry
- 1997 Glengarry
- 1996 Kingussie
- 1995 Kingussie
- 1994 Lochcarron
- 1993 Newtonmore
- 1992 Kingussie
- 1991 Kingussie
- 1990 Kingussie
- 1988 Kingussie
- 1987 Kingussie
- 1986 Skye Camanachd
- 1985 Kingussie
- 1984 Newtonmore
- 1983 Lochcarron
- 1982 Strathglass
- 1981 Newtonmore
- 1980 Caberfeidh
- 1979 Aberdeen University
- 1978 Aberdeen University
- 1977 Glenurquhart
- 1976 Kinlochshiel
- 1975 Kinlochshiel
- 1974 Newtonmore
- 1973 Aberdeen University
- 1972 Glenurquhart
- 1971 Ballachullish
- 1970 Lochcarron
- 1969 Lochcarron
- 1968 Lochcarron
- 1967 Strathglass
- 1966 Kinlochshiel
- 1965 Lochaber
- 1964 Boleskine
- 1963 Newtonmore
- 1962 Glenurquhart
- 1961 Kinlochshiel
- 1960 Glenurquhart
- 1959 Lochcarron
- 1958 Lochcarron
- 1957 Kilmallie
- 1956 Beauly
- 1955 Beauly
- 1954 Beauly
- 1953 Newtonmore
- 1952 Beauly
- 1951 Kingussie
- 1950 Straths Athletic
- 1949 Newtonmore
- 1948 Kilmallie
- 1940 - 1947 No Competition
- 1939 Lochcarron
- 1938 Lovat
- 1937 Lochcarron
- 1936 Lovat
- 1935 Caberfeidh
- 1934 Foyers
- 1933 Strathconon
- 1932 Strathconon
- 1931 Strathconon
- 1930 Strathdearn
- 1929 Strathglass
- 1928 Caberfeidh
- 1927 Caberfeidh
- 1926 Foyers
- 1925 Foyers
- 1924 Lovat
- 1923 Beauly
- 1922 Stratherrick
- 1921 Grantown on Spey
- 1920 Stratherrick
- 1914 Duthil
- 1913 Foyers
- 1912 Foyers
- 1911 Inverness

=== Wins by Clubs ===
Club	Total	Years
Kingussie	12	1951, 1985, 1987, 1988, 1989, 1990, 1991, 1992, 1995, 1996, 2001, 2017
Beauly	5	1923, 1954, 1955, 1956, 2012
Ballachulish	1	1971
Foyers	5	1912, 1913, 1925, 1926, 1934
Newtonmore	16	1949, 1953, 1963, 1974, 1981, 1984, 1993, 1999, 2003, 2005, 2006, 2011, 2014, 2015, 2018, 2022
Aberdeen University	3	1973, 1978, 1979
Inverness	1	1911
Kinlochshiel	4	1961, 1966, 1975, 1976
Lochcarron	9	1939, 1958, 1959, 1968, 1969, 1970, 1983, 1994, 2016
Lochaber	1	1965
Strathdearn	1	1930
Duthil Carrbridge	1	1914
Strathconon	3	1931, 1932, 1933
Straths Athletic	1	1950
Stratherrick	2	1920, 1922
Strathglass	3	1929, 1967, 1982
Grantown-on-Spey	1	1921
Caberfeidh	4	1927, 1928, 1935, 1980
Glenurquhart	6	1960, 1962, 1972, 1977, 2002, 2010
Boleskine	1	1964
Lovat	6	1924, 1936, 1937, 1938, 2013, 2021
Kilmallie	4	1948, 1957, 2004, 2007
Glengarry	2	1997, 1998
Skye	2	1986, 2000
Fort William	3	2008, 2009, 2019
