= Sir William Sutherland Cup =

Scottish trophy in the sport of shinty

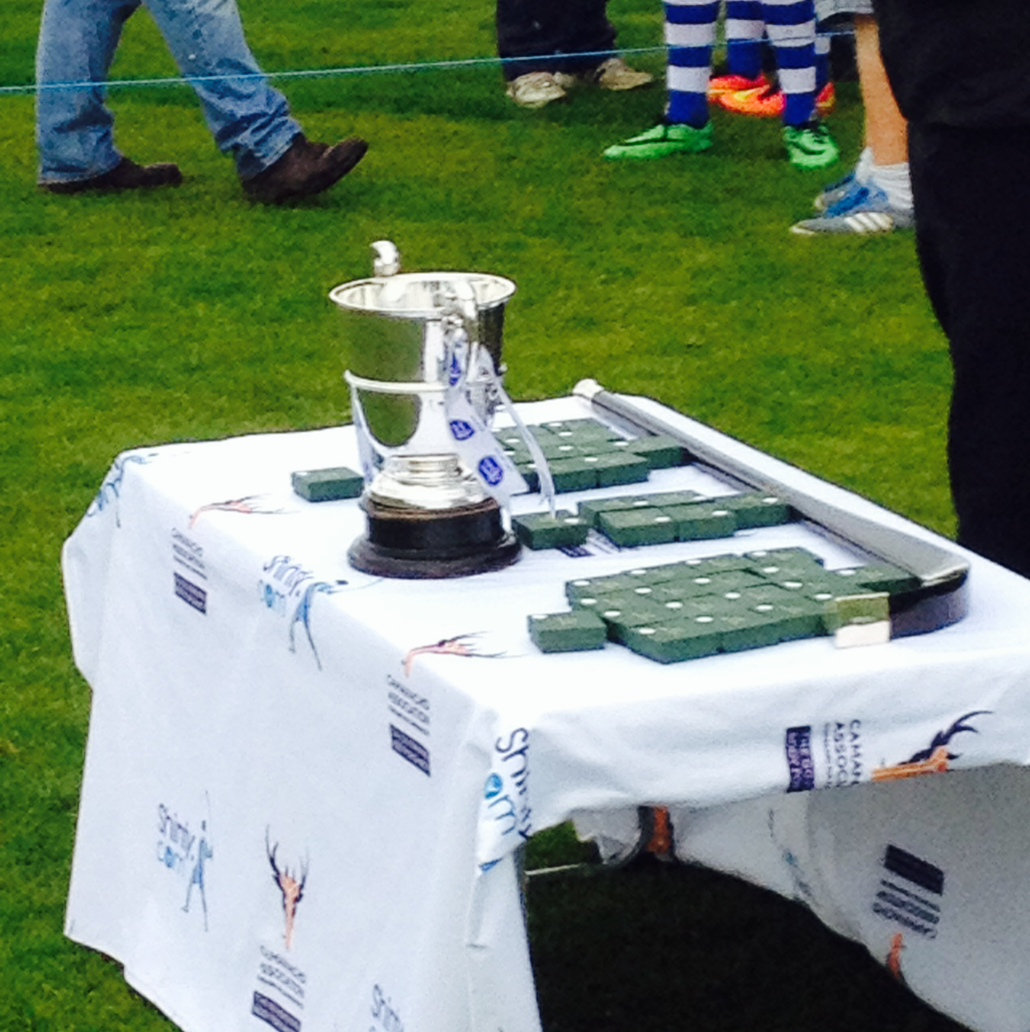
The Sir William Sutherland Cup

The Sir William Sutherland Cup, more commonly known simply as the Sutherland Cup, is a trophy in the sport of shinty. It is the Scottish national cup competition for junior sides, the equivalent of the Camanachd Cup for reserve sides and clubs which field single teams. The 2025 final was won by Fort William Shinty Club reserves.

== History ==
The trophy was donated by Sir William Sutherland as a trophy for a national competition for "junior" clubs. It was first played for in 1923 with Newtonmore Camanachd Club defeating Bute Shinty Club 3–2. Sutherland had previously donated another cup of the same name.

In 2011, the final was held in Aberdeen for the first time to mark the 150th anniversary of Aberdeen University Shinty Club.

In 2012, Newtonmore won the final with a 5–4 victory over Kingussie Camanachd but the result was declared void after the team were found to have played an ineligible player in both the final win and in their semi-final victory over Glenurquhart Shinty Club. The final was replayed between Kingussie and Glenurquhart.

The 2017 final was postponed due to heavy rain in Fort William in late July, and was replayed in September between Lochside Rovers and Kingussie.

2023 marked the 100th anniversary of the first final. The final was played at Blairbeg Park, Drumnadrochit which habitually hosts the final, due to the competition being sponsored by Highland Industrial Supplies whose director is also chairman of Glenurquhart Shinty Club.

Fort William lifted the competition in 2025, defeating Kinlochshiel 6-4 in extra time to complete a treble of trophies. The match was notable for being the first ever match streamed live by the Camanachd Association on YouTube.

== List of finals ==
Apart from during World War II and the COVID-19 pandemic, the final has been played each year since 1923. The details of finals are shown in the list below.

Season	Winner	Score	Runners-up	Venue
1923	Newtonmore	3–2	North Bute	Keppoch
1924	Kyles Athletic	3–2	Newtonmore	Oban
1925	Lochside Rovers	2–0	Newtonmore	Keppoch
1926	Furnace	4–3	Caberfeidh	Newtonmore
1927	Newtonmore	4–0	Kyles Athletic	Oban
1928	Newtonmore	4–0	Colintraive and Glendaruel	Oban
1929	Lochside Rovers	4–3	Strathglass	Spean Bridge
1930	Strathconon	2–1	Colintraive and Glendaruel	Kingussie
1931	Kyles Athletic	3–1	Kingussie	Keppoch
1932	Kyles Athletic	4–1	Newtonmore	Oban
1933	Lochside Rovers	3–1	Strathconon	Keppoch
1934	Nether Lochaber	5–2	Strachur	Oban
1935	Kyles Athletic	5–2	Caberfeidh	Keppoch
1936	Lochside Rovers	5–1	Nether Lochaber	Oban
1937	Lochside Rovers	1–0	Newtonmore	Keppoch
1938	Newtonmore	6–2	Kyles Athletic	Fort William
1939	Lochcarron	5–4	Kilmallie	Newtonmore
No competition held between 1940 and 1946 due to World War II
1947	Oban Celtic	1–1	Newtonmore	Glasgow
1947	Oban Celtic	4–3 (R)	Newtonmore	Fort William
1948	Kilmallie	7–1	Straths Athletic	Fort Augustus
1949	Ballachulish	3–2	Lochcarron	Inverness
1950	Portree	5–4	Newtonmore	Beauly
1951	Spean Bridge	4–3	Straths Athletic	Corpach
1952	Beauly	5–2	Col Glen	Oban
1953	Newtonmore	3–1	Dunstaffnage	Fort William
1954	Beauly	4–2	Appin	Fort William
1955	Lochcarron	1–0	Strachur	Fort William
1956	Beauly	1–0	Lochside Rovers	Spean Bridge
1957	Beauly	3–2	Kilmallie	Spean Bridge
1958	Kilmallie	3–3	Skye	
1958	Kilmallie	4–2 (R)	Skye	Beauly
1959	Newtonmore	7–5	Inveraray	Oban
1960	Lochside Rovers	2–1	Glenurquhart	Spean Bridge
1961	Kyles Athletic	6–1	Newtonmore	Oban
1962	Kinlochshiel	5–4	Kyles Athletic	Fort William
1963	Glenurquhart	3–2	Kyles Athletic	Spean Bridge
1964	Boleskine	4–0	Kyles Athletic	Strachur
1965	Lochaber	3–1	Ballachulish	Fort William
1966	Boleskine	4–2	Kyles Athletic	Fort William
1967	Lochcarron	4–2	Inveraray	Fort William
1968	Lochcarron	2–1	Ballachulish	Inverness
1969	Inveraray	5–1	Ballachulish	Dalmally
1970	Lochcarron	4–2	Ballachulish	Spean Bridge
1971	Ballachulish	2–0	Skye	Inverness
1972	Bute	2–1	Aberdeen University	Spean Bridge
1973	Aberdeen University	6–2	Bute	Oban
1974	Aberdeen University	6–4	Oban Celtic	Kingussie
1975	Kyles Athletic	6–3	Newtonmore	Oban
1976	Kingussie	3–1	Lochaber	Newtonmore
1977	Kinlochshiel	9–1	Glenorchy	Fort William
1978	Fort William	6–3	Oban Celtic	Inveraray
1979	Skye	3–2	Kyles Athletic	Fort William
1980	Kyles Athletic	4–3	Kingussie	Oban
1981	Skye	3–1	Glasgow University	Oban
1982	Glenorchy	2–1	Lochaber	Fort William
1983	Lochaber	6–1	Col Glen	Taynuilt
1984	Fort William	1–0	Bute	Spean Bridge
1985	Skye	2–1	Strachur	Inveraray
1986	Kingussie	5–0	Strachur	Fort William
1987	Kyles Athletic	7–5	Glenurquhart	Taynuilt
1988	Skye	7–2	Strachur	Strathpeffer
1989	Kingussie	6–1	Lochside Rovers	Taynuilt
1990	Kingussie	4–0	Lochside Rovers	Inverness
1991	Kingussie	13–1	Inveraray	Inveraray
1992	Kingussie	5–3	Glasgow Mid Argyll	Spean Bridge
1993	Newtonmore	Abdn (Note: The first final was abandoned due to "appalling weather" with the score 0–0.)	Kingussie	Inveraray
1993	Newtonmore	3–1	Kingussie	Newtonmore
1994	Aberdeen University	4–2	Newtonmore	Newtonmore
1995	Fort William	1–0	Kilmallie	Spean Bridge
1996	Kingussie	6–1	Kilmallie	Fort William
1997	Lochside Rovers	2–1	Glengarry	Newtonmore
1998	Kyles Athletic	2–1	Newtonmore	Fort William
1999	Newtonmore	3–2	Kingussie	Newtonmore
2000	Lovat	2–2 (Note: Lovat won 2–0 on penalties.)	Lochside Rovers	Spean Bridge
2001	Kincraig	3–2	Aberdeen University	Newtonmore
2002	Kilmallie	2–1	Kingussie	Newtonmore
2003	Newtonmore	3–0	Boleskine	Kingussie
2004	Kilmallie	4–0	Inveraray	Ballachulish
2005	Aberdeen University	3–1	Kilmallie	Portree
2006	Fort William	6–0	Glenorchy	Beauly
2007	Kilmallie	1–0	Fort William	Oban
2008	Kilmallie	2–1	Fort William	Kingussie
2009	Fort William	3–1	Lovat	Inverness
2010	Lovat	4–1	Glenurquhart	Newtonmore
2011	Kingussie	6–1	Kyles Athletic	Aberdeen
2012	Kingussie	2–0	Glenurquhart	Beauly
2013	Ballachulish	3–1	Lochcarron	Farr
2014	Kyles Athletic	4–2 (aet)	Fort William	Newtonmore
2015	Newtonmore	5–0	Lochside Rovers	Ballachulish
2016	Newtonmore	6–0	Kingussie	Kingussie
2017	Lochside Rovers	3–1	Kingussie	Fort William
2018	Newtonmore	5–2 (aet)	Kingussie	Kingussie
2019	Lochside Rovers	2–1	Lovat	Caol
2020	No competition due to the COVID-19 pandemic			
2021	Newtonmore	5–1	Lovat	Drumnadrochit
2022	Newtonmore	3–2	Lovat	Drumnadrochit
2023	Newtonmore	4–2	Skye	Drumnadrochit
2024	Kingussie	3–2	Skye	Drumnadrochit
2025	Fort William	6–4	Kinlochshiel	Drumnadrochit

=== Results by team ===
Club	Wins	First win	Last win	Runners up	First loss	Last loss	Total finals
Aberdeen University	4	1973	2005	2	1972	2001	6
Appin	0	–		1	1954		1
Ballachulish	3	1949	2013	4	1965	1970	7
Beauly	4	1952	1957	0	–		4
Boleskine	2	1964	1966	1	2003		3
Bute	1	1972		3	1923 (Note: The team that played in the 1923 final was named North Bute.)	1984	3
Caberfeidh	0	–		2	1926	1935	2
Col-Glen (Note: Until the 1930s the club was known as Colintraive and Glendaruel.)	0	–		4	1928	1983	4
Dunstaffnage	0	–		1	1953		1
Fort William	6	1978	2025	3	2007	2014	9
Furnace	1	1926		0	–		1
Glasgow Mid Argyll	0	–		1	1992		1
Glasgow University	0	–		1	1981		1
Glengarry	0	–		1	1997		1
Glenorchy	1	1982		2	1977	2006	3
Glenurquhart	1	1963		4	1960	2012	5
Inveraray	1	1969		4	1959	2004	5
Kilmallie	6	1948	2008	5	1939	2005	11
Kincraig	1	2001		0	–		1
Kingussie	10	1976	2024	8	1931	2018	18
Kinlochshiel	2	1962	1977	1	2025		3
Kyles Athletic	10	1924	2014	8	1927	2011	18
Lochaber	2	1965	1983	2	1976	1982	4
Lochcarron	5	1939	1970	2	1949	2013	7
Lochside Rovers (Note: Lochside Rovers are the reserve side of Oban Camanachd.)	9	1925	2019	5	1956	2015	14
Lovat	2	2000	2010	4	2009	2022	6
Nether Lochaber	1	1934		1	1935		8
Newtonmore	15	1923	2023	10	1924	1998	25
Oban Celtic	1	1947		2	1974	1978	3
Skye Camanachd	5	1950 (Note: The Skye side that won the 1950 final played under the name Portree.)	1988	4	1958	2024	9
Spean Bridge	1	1951		0	–		1
Strachur and District	0	–		5	1934	1988	5
Strathconon	1	1930		1	1933		2
Strathglass	0	–		1	1929		1
Straths Athletic	0	–		2	1948	1951	2
