= James Clark (shinty) =

James "Big Jim" Clark (born 1973) is an ex-shinty player from Invergarry, Scotland. He gained fame from his last minute goals which secured a succession of Camanachd Cup triumphs for Fort William Shinty Club.

== Playing career ==
He was a half-back early in his career, when he started out playing for Glengarry but soon moved to the Fort (a regional colloquialism for Fort William Shinty Club) in 1993. He was capped by Scotland at under-21 level and also graduated to the senior side. He once scored four goals in a MacTavish Cup final but still ended up on the losing side.

He won the Albert Smith Medal twice for his matchwinning performances in the Camanachd Cup final in 2007 and 2008. He is famed for going up to receive his medals with his children in his arms.

In the 2011 season, Clark switched back to his original position in defence, as Fort played out a trophyless season for the first time since 2003. There was mounting speculation, fuelled by the player himself, that Clark might retire at the end of the season. This was confirmed in November 2011 due to fitness and work issues.
