= Norman MacArthur =

Scottish shinty player

Norman "Brick" MacArthur (born 20 May 1960) is a retired shinty player and current president of Newtonmore Camanachd Club.

== Biography ==
MacArthur was a player with Newtonmore since the mid-70s and won several Camanachd Cups. He was the Albert Smith Medal winner in 1985.

He has been manager of the club since 2006 and has been instrumental in the club's attempts to emerge from the shadows of their great rivals, Kingussie. Under MacArthur's management, Newtonmore reached the MacAulay Cup final in 2008, won the MacTavish Cup in 2009 (the club's first trophy in 7 years) and were only pipped by goal difference to the Premier Division by Kingussie in 2009. "Brick" finally led Newtonmore to league glory in 2010 as a goal from Danny MacRae in the final game of the season against Fort William ensured that Newtonmore won the league by 3 points from the Fort. He has since led the team in 2011 to an eagerly awaited Scottish Cup Final against old foes Kingussie, as well as overhauling Kyles Athletic on the last day of the season to retain the League title.

In the aftermath of the league victory he confirmed that he would be staying on for 2011. This was despite a pledge to his wife that he would retire after the age of 50. He will continue into 2012.

His son, Paul MacArthur, plays in the first team, as does his son-in-law, John MacKenzie, who is married to MacArthur's daughter Gayle.
