= Drew MacNeil =

Shinty player and manager

Drew McNeil (born 1964) is a former shinty player and current manager of the Scotland national shinty team. He was appointed Glenurquhart manager in October 2011.

== Biography ==
McNeil, along with his older brother, Scott, started out playing for Lochaber Camanachd. He and his brother then moved to Fort William, where they became integral parts of the team. Drew was captain of Fort William when they won the Camanachd Cup in 1992.

He moved to Inverness for three seasons but returned to An Aird to win the Camanachd Cup again in 2005. He then became manager of Fort William in 2007 and was the manager as Fort won an historic 3-in-a-row Camanachd Cup finals..

However towards the end of the 2009 season, McNeil was unceremoniously sacked due to a fall-out with the club committee in the October. This saga was played out in the Highland media.

He was appointed Scotland manager in early 2010. He has also been a regular pundit on BBC Alba coverage of shinty despite his lack of Scots Gaelic. McNeil became a member of the Glenurquhart coaching staff in early 2011 and on the resignation of Jim Barr in October 2011, he was appointed to the top job.

He went to manage Glenurquharthttps://en.m.wikipedia.org/wiki/Glenurquhart_Shinty_Club to their first ever senior trophy defeating Oban Camanchd in the Macaulay Cup and losing out to Lovat on penalties in the MacTavish Cup final

McNeil expressed an interest in staying on as Scotland manager despite conceding the series to Ireland twice in 2010 and 2011. The Camanachd Association extended McNeil's contract to 2013.

In 2015 he joined Inverness Shinty Club and went on to create a Primary schools shinty Academy in the City in an attempt to move shinty into a mainstream sport for boys and girls of all ages and abilities. The Academy facilitates shinty in 14 Primary schools with 40+ coaches all volunteers

As shinty is an amateur sport, McNeil was formerly a prison officer and is now a community worker in Merkinch.
