= Strathspey =

Strathspey may refer to one of the following:

- Strathspey, Scotland, an area in the Highlands of Scotland
- Strathspey Camanachd, a shinty team from Grantown-on-Spey
- Strathspey (dance), a type of dance tune in 4/4 time
