= Lovat Shinty Club =

Shinty club from Scotland

Lovat
- Full name: Lovat Shinty Club
- Gaelic name: Comann Camanachd Lobhait
- Nickname: Lilywhites
- Founded: 1888
- Ground: Balgate, Kiltarlity
- Manager: Iain Nicolson
- League: Premiership
- 2025: 9th
- Reserve Manager: Fraser Galllacher
- League: North Division Two
- 2025: 6th
Home	Away

Lovat Shinty Club is a shinty club from Kiltarlity, Inverness-shire, Scotland. The club was formed in 1888 and takes its name from the area within which it plays in. The club won the Camanachd Cup in 2015.

== History ==
Founded in 1888, the club has never folded but did merge with Beauly early in the 20th century and won the Camanachd Cup in 1912/13 as the combined team. After the first war, the team also reached the final in 1925.

In 1953, Lovat's enjoyed much success, achieving the Grand Slam, winning all competitions they entered at Senior and Junior level, the first club to achieve this feat. The same set of players had previously won the Celtic Society Cup which was a South District Competition in 1950 and 1951.

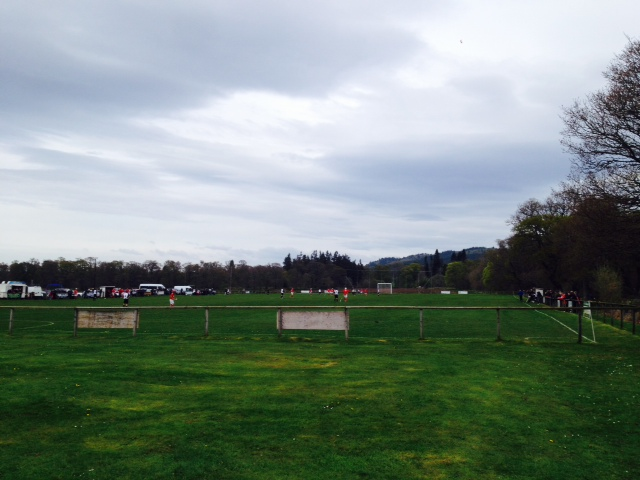
Balgate, home ground of Lovat

Despite being close to Inverness, Lovat still maintain two strong teams due to a strong youth policy and the support of the local primary school. The club is always well represented at youth international level.

The club partakes in the traditional Lovat vs Beauly New Year's Day match, the Lovat Cup. This game typical attracts the largest crowd for a shinty match outside of the Camanachd Cup final.

In November 2007, following Kinlochshiel's draw with Caberfeidh, Lovat became a Marine Harvest Premier Division Team. This was a massive achievement for the Kiltarlity side and was somewhat ahead of schedule given the very young age of the team.

However, Lovat's 2008 season in the Premier Division was a hard campaign and the club was eventually relegated having been marooned at the bottom of the league for almost the whole season. The club's first team won North Division One again in 2009, this marked a successful season for the club where its second team had also reached the Sutherland and Strathdearn Cup finals, losing to Fort William on both occasions.

Lovat had a successful season in 2010, surviving in the Premier Division and seeing the second team again reach the finals of the Strathdearn and Sutherland. Again, the club faced the same team as opponents, playing Glenurquhart in both games. Lovat lost the Strathdearn but claimed the Sutherland live on BBC Alba. This victory was notable as it was held at the Eilan in Newtonmore, just down the road from the Dell in Kingussie where Lovat had secured a rare point against Kingussie earlier in the day.

2011 saw Lovat play well but never fully extricate themselves from relegation trouble until their final match of the season when a 3–2 win over Kilmallie secured Premier Division shinty for another year. James Gallacher & John MacRitchie stepped down from their roles as co-managers to be replaced by successful second-team manager Alan MacRae.

Lovat achieved their highest league placing since their glory days winning the North Division One, with a third-place finish in the 2012 Premiership.

On 15 June 2013 Lovat won their first major trophy since 1953 when they won the MacTavish Cup. They also secured a highest ever Premiership finish as runners-up to Newtonmore, and finished the season with the best defensive record in shinty. As well as tasting reserve success in the Strathdearn Cup. They retained the MacTavish Cup in 2014, reinforcing their position as the most successful side in the competition outside the Badenoch giants, Kingussie & Newtonmore, having won the trophy eight times in all. They finished the season in second but pushed Newtonmore much harder than in 2013.

In 2015, Lovat had, by recent standards, a poor league season. However, under John Macritchie, they did lift the Camanachd Cup, the biggest prize in the game. Kyles Athletic were the opponents in a tie played in Oban. It was a tight contest and finished 2-1 thanks to a Kevin Bartlett double and an Albert Smith medal winning performance from Stuart MacDonald.

After this the club went on a run of making 4 of the next 6 Camanachd Cup finals. However on each occasion were defeated, twice by Newtonmore during their 4 titles in a row, once by Kinlochshiel on their first ever victory and by Kingussie in a match played at The Dell in Kingussie.

The junior side had post Covid success winning the 2021 Strathdearn cup on penalties against Newtonmore after being 4-0 down in extra time.

Lovat reached the 2024 Camanachd Cup Final, losing 3-2 in a tough fought match at An Aird, Fort William to a Kingussie side who completed their grand slam that day. 2025 saw a raft of changes with a number of club stalwarts retiring, as manager Jamie Matheson was succeeded during the off season by Iain Nicolson. Lovat II also requested to be relegated to Mowi North Division 2, due to the young age of their reserves squad, with Fraser Gallacher's squad being handed an 8 point deduction as a result of this. Lovat once again met Kingussie in a final, this time in the 2025 MacTavish Cup Final, losing 2-0 before finishing the season in 9th which resulted in relegation to the National Division.

== Ladies team ==
Lovat Ladies
- Full name: Lovat Ladies
- Gaelic name: Boireannaich Lobhait
- Nickname: Lovat Lassies
- Founded: 2011
- Ground: Balgate, Kiltarlity
- Manager: Cammy MacMillan
- League: North League
- 2025: 4th
Home

Lovat established a ladies team in 2011, which plays in National Division Two. The area had a long tradition of girls playing shinty alongside boys until a certain age, with players leaving the sport. In the 2010s, local talent was corralled by Gillian Currie and Gemma MacKinnon, two Scotland internationalists who had settled in the area, into a first ever Lovat ladies team. Scotland internationalist youngster, Laura Gallacher, also returned to her home club after several years playing for Glengarry. The club was featured in the "Swags" documentary on BBC Alba, Christmas 2013.

== Club staff ==
Club President	John MacRitchie
Club Treasurer	Rachel MacRitchie
Club Secretary	Linda Bell
1st Team manager	Jamie Matheson
1st Team Captain	Martin Mainland
Club Trainer
2nd Team manager	Fraser Gallacher
Under 17 Manager	Ian Matheson, Cammy MacMillan
Under 14 Co-managers	Martin Bell

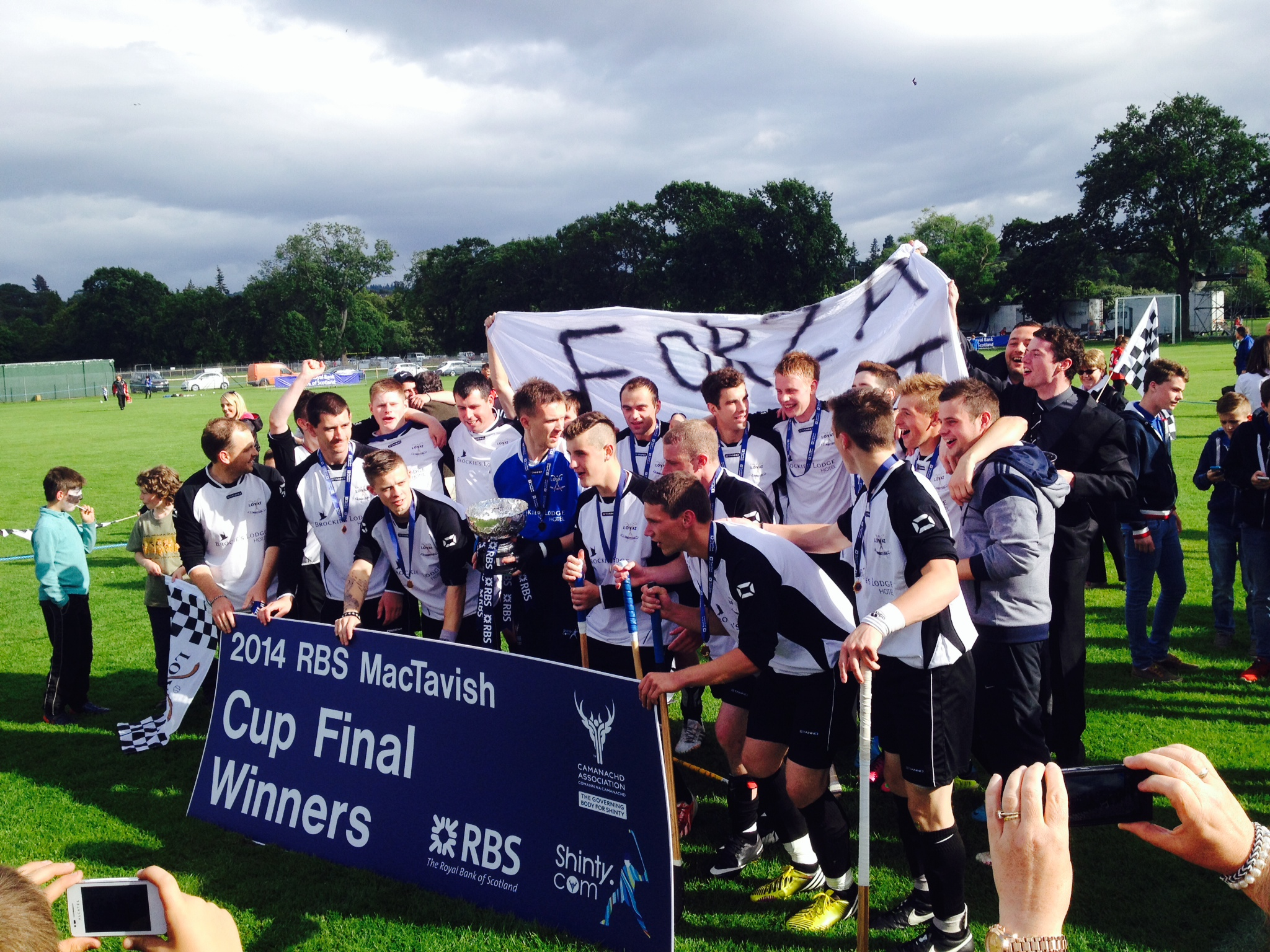
Lovat retain the MacTavish Cup in 2014
