= Boleskine =

Boleskine may refer to:

- Boleskine House, a manor house in Scotland owned by Aleister Crowley and Jimmy Page
- Aleister Crowley (1875–1947), also known as Lord Boleskine, English occultist
- Boleskine Camanachd, a Scottish shinty club
