= Lesley McKenna =

British snowboarder

Lesley McKenna (born 9 August 1974 in Aviemore, Badenoch and Strathspey) is a former British professional snowboarder based in Aviemore, Scotland. McKenna has to date competed in three Winter Olympic Games in 2002, 2006 and 2010 but has not won any medals. At the 2010 games, she crashed in both her qualification runs in the women's halfpipe and finished last. She has also competed on the world cup circuit for several years with more success achieving six podium positions including two first placings in 2003. She was ranked 3rd in the world by the FIS for halfpipe in 2004 despite suffering from a broken jaw which took her out for most of the season. Lesley was also an ambassador for Scotland and after competing worked as the international team manager for the brand Roxy which is the female sister brand of the surf brand Quiksilver. Lesley is now the Team Manager for the GB Park and Pipe Team.

Lesley directed the first International feature length, all girl snowboarding film 'DropStitch' in 2004. This was followed by the film 'Transfer' in 2005.

McKenna is a cousin of former alpine skiers Alain Baxter and Noel Baxter.
