= North Division Three (shinty) =

Marine Harvest North Division Three
- Folded: 2015
- Country: Scotland
- Confederation: Camanachd Association
- Promotion to: North Division Two
- Last champions: Skye Camanachd
- Website: www.shinty.com

The North Division Three was the fifth tier of the Shinty league system before folding in 2015.
