= Bute Shinty Club =

Bute
- Full name: Bute Shinty Club
- Gaelic name: Comann Camanachd Eilean Bhoid
- Founded: 1906
- Ground: The Meadows, Rothesay
- Manager: Ted McDonald
- League: National Division
- 2025: 4th
- Reserve Manager: David Kilpatrick
- League: South Division Two
- 2025: 3rd
Home

Bute Shinty Club is a shinty club from Rothesay, Isle of Bute, Scotland. It has a reserve team which is in South Division Two.

== History ==
The club has been reconstituted on several occasions since its formation in 1906. There was Bute Camanachd and North Bute Shinty Club: North Bute competed in the first ever Sutherland Cup final in 1923. The club has existed in its present form since 1946.

The club won the Sutherland Cup in 1972 and has won the reintroduced Balliemore Cup on four occasions, notably in the first final in 1985 as well as in 2006, when they defeated a Beauly team who held home advantage. 2006 was one of the club's most successful seasons of all time winning South Division One thus gaining promotion to the Premier Division, winning the Balliemore Cup and reaching the final of the Celtic Society Cup.

In 2008, after several years as a one team club, Bute restarted their second team, which finished fifth in South Division Two in their first season.

The club reached the semi-finals of the Camanachd Cup for the first time in 2008.

In 2009, they were the last club to finish their season on 12 December 2009. They eventually survived relegation, overhauling Lochaber Camanachd with a win against Oban Camanachd.

2010 saw Bute's period in the Premier Division come to an end with a loss against Oban Camanachd, who had been behind the whole season until that last game.

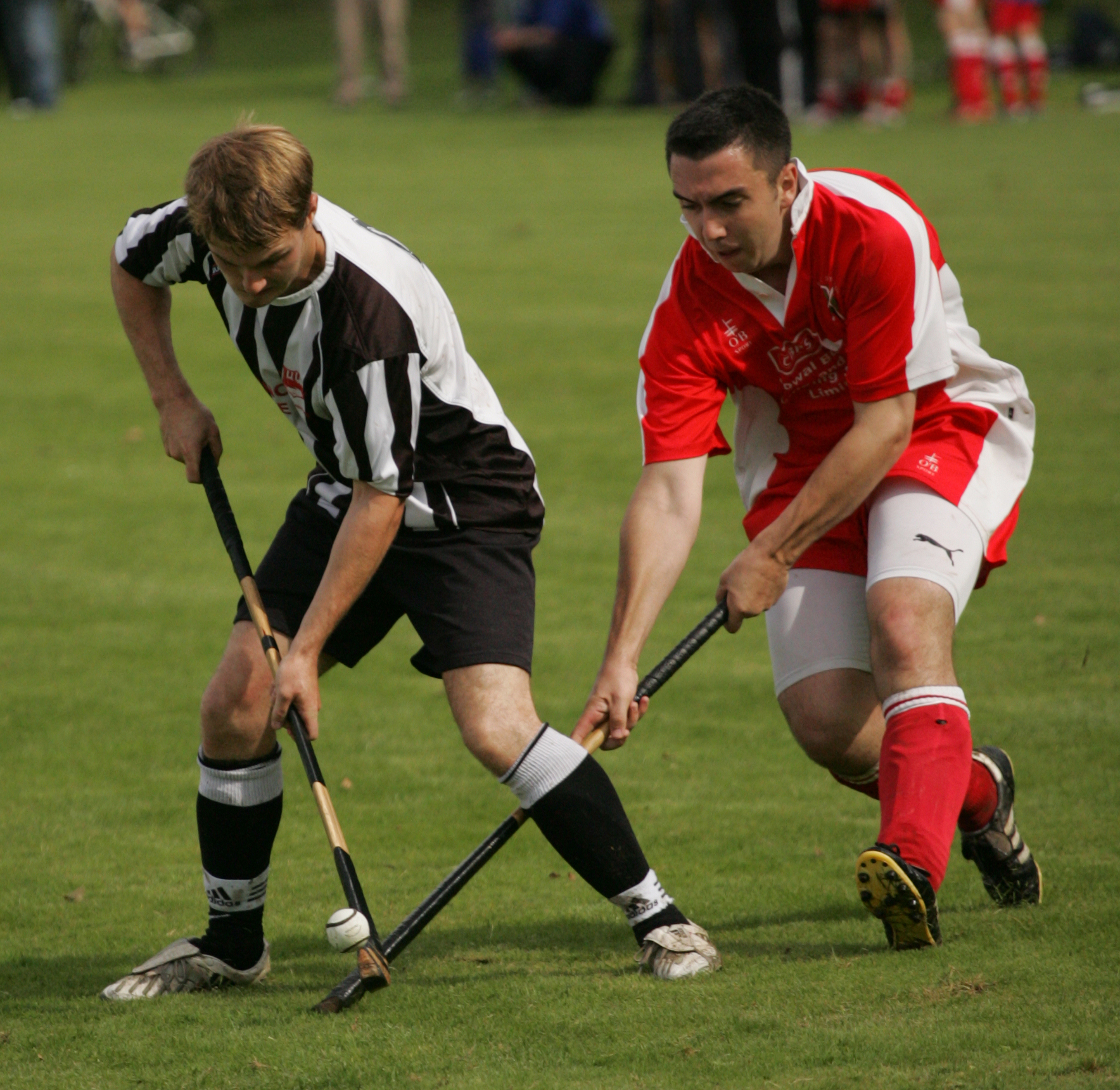
Bute Vs Glenorchy

Bute romped back into the Premier Division in 2011 with a stunning 100% record in the league as well as winning the Balliemore Cup. Bute were relegated in 2012 from a very competitive Premiership.

The club's top player during this period was Hector Whitelaw, a full international who played both in attacking and defensive positions. He scored a number of goals for the team.

The club was one of the main opponents of the national league setup due to the difficulty of traveling to away games in places such as Cannich and Portree. (Until the establishment of Lewis Camanachd, they were the only senior team in Scotland with no fixed link to the mainland.).

The stepping back of Whitelaw to the second team and the loss of the Zavaroni brothers to Kyles Athletic saw Bute take a step back but they still made good showings in the cups and also made it into the National Division One setup for 2014 with a second-place finish in Division South One.

Several other player changes in 2014 led to a disastrous showing in National Division One, even conceding a game at one point. Bute finished rock bottom and were due for relegation to South Division One, but were given a reprieve due to league reconstruction. However, Bute elected to be relegated to South Division One, feeling that National Division shinty was not feasible for the club at that time. In January 2015, former referee Ted McDonald became their senior team coach.

Bute came within inches of returning to the Premiership in 2025, however two final day red cards saw them lose to Inveraray, sending Col-Glen to the Premiership instead.

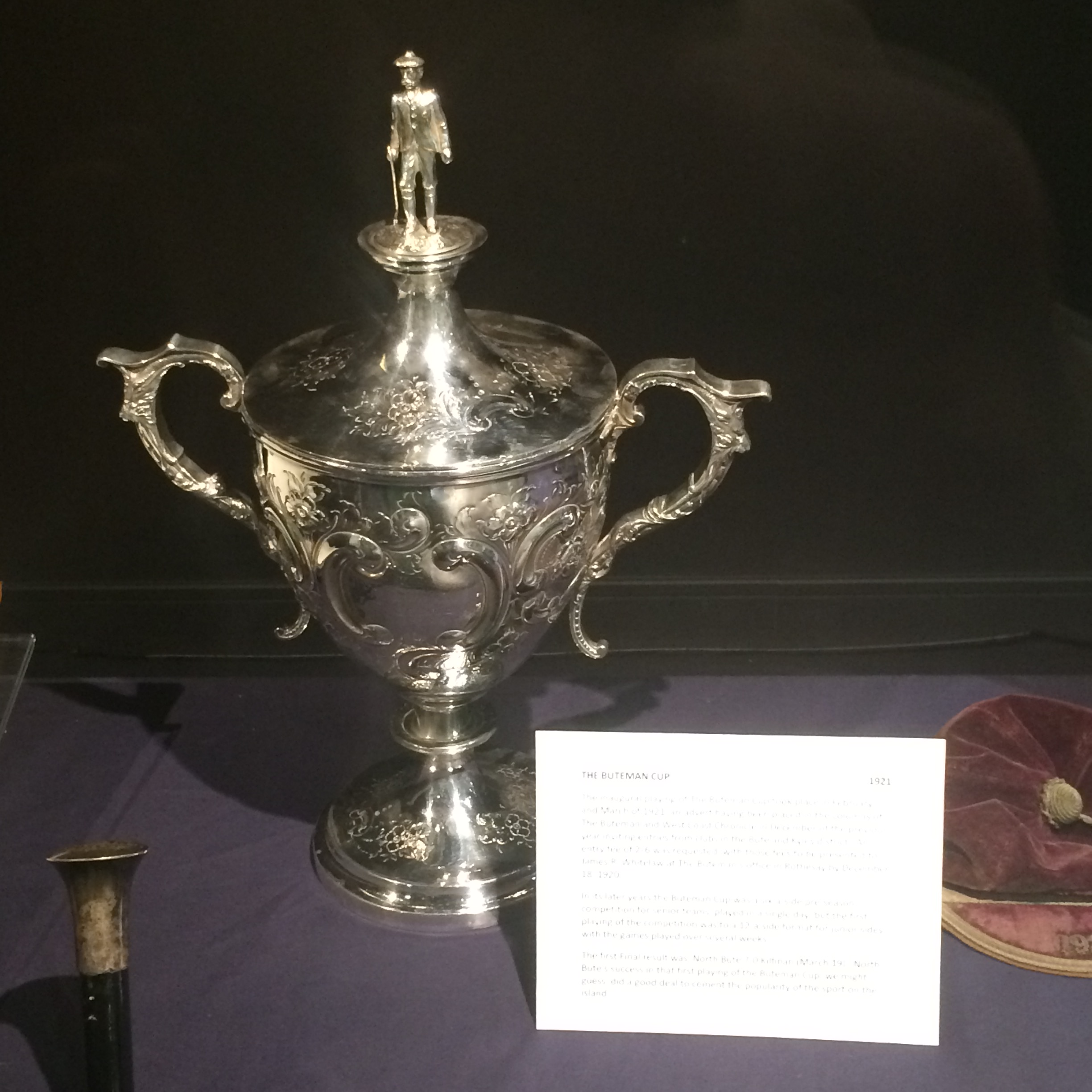
The Buteman Cup - Shinty Trophy, played for by teams in the Cowal and Bute area
