= Hector Whitelaw =

Shinty player from Rothesay, Isle of Bute

Hector Whitelaw is a shinty player from Rothesay, Isle of Bute. He plays for Bute Shinty Club and has been integral to that club's success since 2000. Hector is known and admired within the wider shinty community for his commitment to the team . Sustaining a number of injuries during matches without leaving the game and playing until the final whistle, seeking medical attention at a later time. ( eg. Teeth knocked out etc.)

== Career ==
Whitelaw has played his whole career with Bute. He is able to play both in attack and in defence. He is renowned for his power and ability to hold on to the ball. He has played numerous times for Scotland at shinty/hurling and has been prolific at the compromise game. He was vice-captain in 2009.

He has won the Balliemore Cup twice as well as South Division One. He has also featured in a Camanachd Cup semi-final. He was the man of Golden Heart .

== Other sports ==
Whitelaw is also involved with local football team, Rothesay Brandane.
