= Lovat Cup =

Shinty trophy

The Lovat Cup is a trophy in the sport of shinty contested annually at New Year by Beauly Shinty Club and Lovat Shinty Club.

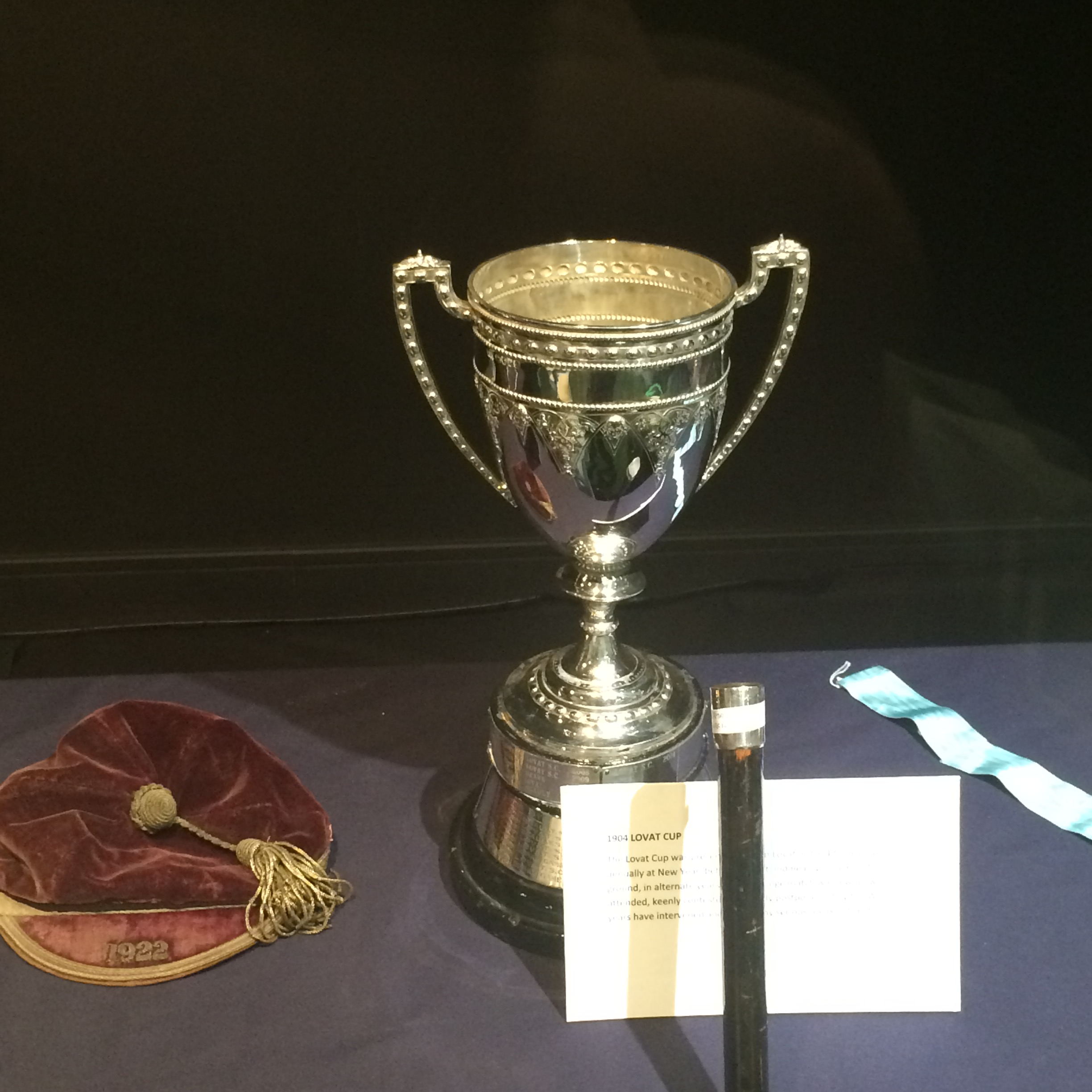
The Lovat Cup Shinty Trophy

The trophy was first played for in 1904 and is very popular , attracting the second largest crowd for a shinty fixture in Scotland, outwith the Camanachd Cup Final. The fixture alternates annually between Balgate, Kiltarlity and Braeview Park, Beauly. The two clubs' strong rivalry contributes to an entertaining game. This rivalry was once described as so keen that "a cold stream ran between them".

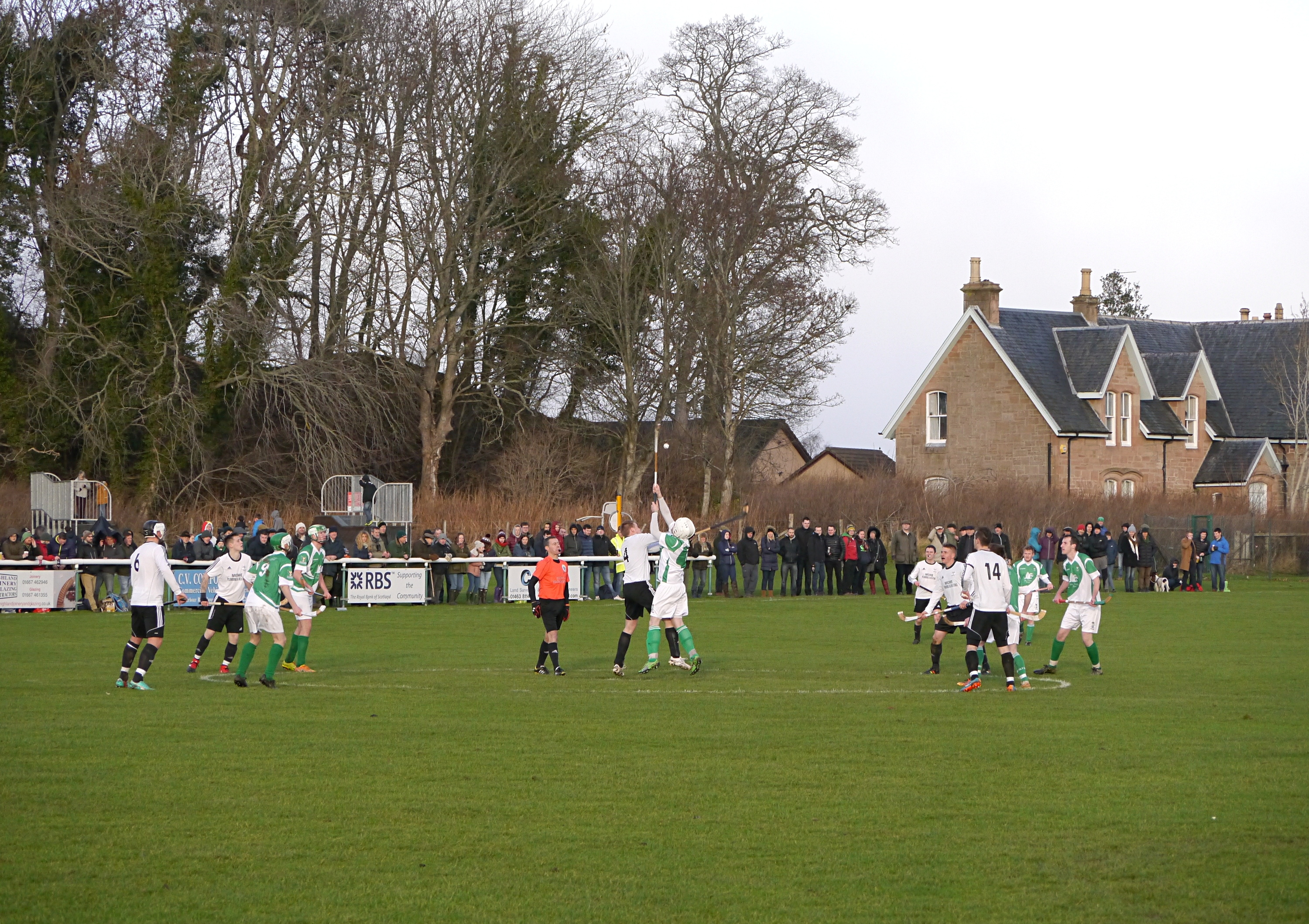
Lovat Cup 2017

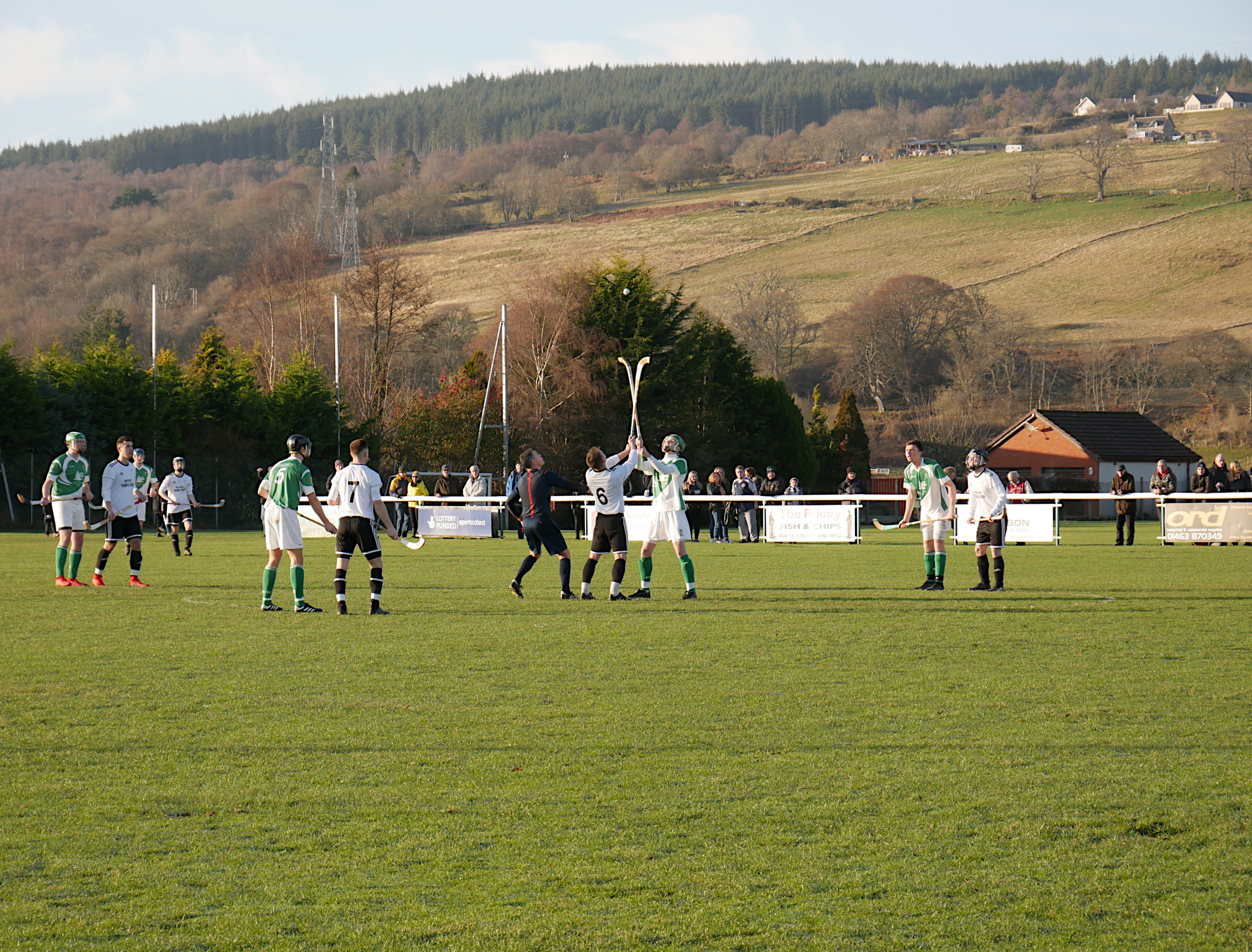
Lovat Cup 2019

Lovat retained the title in 2009. The 2010 fixture was cancelled due to heavy snow. The rules of the competition mean that the competition cannot be rescheduled and so Lovat again retained the trophy. Lovat historically has a win ratio of two-to-one in the series.

Under the competition's rules, the need for a draw to retain the cup means that matters are settled in the regulation 90 minutes without the need for extra-time or penalties. This was the case with the 2011 fixture, where a 2–2 draw saw Lovat retain the cup.

Beauly regained the cup in 2015 but Lovat won in 2016 on home soil. Lovat won the next 3 years in a row, all away from home with the 2018 tie being reversed due to a frozen pitch in Kiltarlity, Greg Matheson scoring all 4 in a 4–0 win, in 2019 Lovat won 3-1 without the aid of Matheson who was injured to extend the period of dominance over their lower league rivals. In 2020, the game was played at Balgate with a Greg Matheson double and strike from Lewis Tawse enough to help Lovat to a 3–1 victory.

There was then a pause due to the COVID-19 pandemic and frozen pitches postponing the matches until 2024. A trio of 1-1 draws were enough to see Lovat retain the trophy in 2024, 2025 & 2026 for a 9th, 10th & 11th year.

== Results ==
Date	Venue	Winner	Score	Notes
2007		Beauly	2 – 0	
2008	Balgate Park	Lovat	3 – 2	
2009	Braeview Park	Lovat	2 – 1	
2 January 2010	Cancelled due to snow			
3 January 2011	Braeview Park	Draw	2 – 2	
2 January 2012	Balgate Park	Lovat	3 – 1	
2013	Braeview Park	Beauly	2 – 1	
2014	Balgate Park	Lovat	4 – 1	
2015	Braeview Park	Beauly	3 – 1	
2016	Balgate Park	Lovat	3 – 2	
2 January 2017	Braeview Park	Lovat	5 – 2	
2018	Braeview Park	Lovat	4 – 0	
2019	Braeview Park	Lovat	3 – 1	
2 January 2020	Balgate Park	Lovat	3 – 1	
2 January 2021	Cancelled due to COVID-19 pandemic			
3 January 2022	Cancelled due to COVID-19 pandemic			
2 January 2023	Cancelled due to frozen pitch			
2 January 2024	Balgate Park	Draw	1 – 1	
2 January 2025	Braeview Park	Draw	1 – 1	
2 January 2026	Balgate Park	Draw	1-1	
