= Aberdeen University Shinty Club =

Scottish shinty club

Aberdeen University
- Full name: Aberdeen University Shinty Club
- Gaelic name: Club Camanachd Oilthigh Obar Dheathain
- Founded: 1861
- Ground: Balgownie, Bridge of Don, Aberdeen
- Manager: Selection Committee
- League: North Division Two
- 2025: 5th
| Home | Away |

Aberdeen University Shinty Club is a shinty club from Aberdeen, Scotland, that plays in Marine Harvest North Division One. It is the oldest constituted shinty club in Scotland, and therefore the world, dating back to November 9, 1861 in a document held by the University of Aberdeen. The club celebrated its 150th anniversary in 2011. The team is the current champion of North Division Two.

Despite the club's name, it is not a University club and participates at a senior level with students, non-students and former students in the team. However, there is a student team that competes in University competitions under the same name.

== History ==
The club was established in 1861 through the merger of Kings College and Marischal College shinty clubs, making it the oldest constituted shinty club. In 2005, the club had its best season ever, winning the National Intermediate Indoor six-a-side competition in Perth, the North Division 2 Title and the Sutherland Cup, only the fourth time the club had won the trophy.

By 2006, the club was still predominantly made up of Highland exiles, although there are increasing numbers of newcomers taking up the game as they study at Aberdeen University.

In 2007, the club finished at bottom of North Division One, although they failed to play a game against Caberfeidh, which resulted in the docking of two points which would have placed them a point ahead of Inverness Shinty Club.

In 2008, the club applied for entry into North Division Three and were successful, allowing the club to compete at a higher level of shinty. They eliminated Skye Camanachd from the Strathdearn Cup on May 31, 2008.

In 2010, the club finished level in points with Lochaber Camanachd's reserves at the top of North Division Three. A playoff ensued at Castle Leod, Strathpeffer. Lochaber defeated the University 3–2 with a goal in the final minute.

In 2011, the club won the third division, finishing undefeated. They also lost to Kingussie (eventual winners) in the Sutherland cup quarter finals. The Sutherland cup final was held at the Aberdeen University in celebration of its 150th season. The club welcomed Alex Salmond MSP, First Minister of Scotland as patron.

The club finished bottom of North Division Two in 2014, but was saved from relegation by league reconstruction. They won the reconstructed North Two in 2016, finishing undefeated with over 100 goals scored.

There was also an Aberdeen Camanachd side in existence through the 1960s and 1970 founded by Peter English, which drew on the large Highland community living in the area for working in North Sea oil.

== See also ==
University Shinty
