= Noel Baxter =

Scottish alpine skier (born 1981)

Noel Baxter (born 25 July 1981) is a Scottish alpine skier from Aviemore. He represented Britain at the 2002 and 2006 Winter Olympics.

== Skiing career ==
He represented Great Britain in 2002 Olympics, coming 21st in the men's slalom.

Baxter was not picked for the 2010 Winter Olympics in Vancouver. After retiring from competition Baxter became a coach for the Spanish national ski team. he now coaches the British Women's Alpine Team. Baxter, as with his brother Alain, also played shinty for Kincraig Camanachd.

== Family ==
He is the half-brother of fellow Alpine skier, Alain Baxter, and a cousin of snowboarder Lesley McKenna. He was in a relationship with Argentine alpine skier Macarena Simari Birkner, with whom he has a child.
