= Kincraig Camanachd Club =

Shinty team from Kincraig, Badenoch, Scotland

Kincraig
- Full name: Kincraig Camanachd Club
- Gaelic name: Comann Camanachd Cheann na Creige
- Nickname: N/A
- Founded: 1920
- Ground: Invereshie, Kincraig
- Manager: N/A
- League: Non-league
- 2009: 10th (withdrew) ND3
Home

Kincraig Camanachd Club is a shinty team from Kincraig, Badenoch, Scotland. The club's only team withdrew from North Division 3 in 2007 due to a lack of players, but re-entered the league in 2008, however Kincraig withdrew yet again in 2009. The club is currently abeyance at senior level as of 2010. As of 2014, the club has started redeveloping its senior side with an aim to re-enter the leagues in the future. The club is also notable for providing at least three Olympians for Great Britain.

== History ==
Formed in 1920 after the amalgamation of Alvie and Insh Shinty Clubs, Kincraig have gained the reputation as the third team in Badenoch due to its proximity to Kingussie and Newtonmore. The club was traditionally a good outlet for players who could not get a game for either club, but in recent years this supply dried up.

The club went into abeyance in 1955 but restarted in 1972. Olympic skiers Alain Baxter, Noel Baxter and Andrew Freshwater all played regularly for the club in the past. Ronald Ross is originally from the Kincraig area.

The club won the Sir William Sutherland Cup in 2001, its first National silverware.

The club again went into abeyance during season 2007 with committee members blaming a lack of cooperation from Kingussie and Newtonmore in loaning them youth players.

The club applied late for the 2008 season but were allowed into the league at short notice. They competed well in 2008 and 2009 saw them start the season but they encountered severe team raising difficulties in the second half of the season which resulted in them withdrawing from North Division Three. The club is again went into abeyance at senior level but aims for re-entry to senior shinty in 2010 were dashed after a poor turnout at the AGM. President Dennis Meldrum was hopeful that there would be a return to senior shinty sooner rather than later.

Former Club badge until 2009

In 2011, a team based in the Grantown-on-Spey area, called Strathspey Camanachd, arose. Several players formerly with Kincraig moved to Strathspey in 2012. However, in 2013 Kincraig showed signs of recovery with a few friendlies and a visit to Lewis. They did not return to league shinty in 2014, but continue to develop their youth system, with the aim of entering in 2015.
