= Alain Baxter =

British skier

Personal information
- Born: 26 December 1973 (age 52) Edinburgh, Scotland

Skiing career
- Sport: Alpine skiing ♂
- Retired: 2009
- Disciplines: Slalom
- World Cup debut: 1996

Alain Baxter (born 26 December 1973) is a Scottish former alpine skier who was formerly a professional specialising in the slalom discipline. He is best known for failing a drug test after finishing third in the men's slalom of the 2002 Winter Olympics, resulting in him being controversially stripped of the bronze medal; he would have become the first British person to win an Olympic medal in a skiing event. The use of a nasal inhaler purchased in the US had led to the presence of a banned substance in Baxter's urine. He was allowed to return to competition, although his appeal to have the medal reinstated failed. He competed in FIS events from 1991 to 2009 and became known as "The Highlander". In the World Cup events, he achieved eleven top-fifteen finishes and four top-ten results.

== Early life ==
Baxter was born on 26 December 1973 in Edinburgh, Scotland. He is the son of Iain and Sue Baxter, who were both British Ski Team members. Baxter's father named him after Alan Breck Stewart, a character from the Robert Louis Stevenson novel Kidnapped, who was a rebellious Highlander. The French spelling led some to believe he was named after the 70s French skiing star Alain Penz. He was educated at Kingussie High School.

== Skiing career ==
At 16 years of age, he was selected to the British Alpine Ski Team in 1991. Baxter's first 10 years of competition were achieved without him having access to any significant funding. Austrian journalists gave him the sobriquet "The Highlander". He steadily worked his way through the world rankings, making the top 100 in time for the 1998 Nagano Winter Olympics. At Nagano in the giant slalom he straddled a gate and was disqualified, having been 15th-fastest at the checkpoint just before. He finished 31st in the giant slalom.

His best result in World Cup was 4th at Åre 11 March 2001. This was Britain's highest placed Alpine finish in twenty years. He had three other top 10 finishes in 2001. In 2001, at Wengen he finished seventh in the World Cup Slalom, the best performance by a Britain at the Swiss resort.

Ahead of the 2002 Winter Olympics, ski technology was developing rapidly and Baxter knew that his sponsor Head, was struggling to keep up the progress made by other ski manufacturers.

== Salt Lake City Olympics ==
In the Salt Lake City Olympics of 2002, Baxter made British Olympic history on 23 February by becoming the first British skier to win a medal (Bronze) in alpine skiing. In the men's slalom, Baxter was in eighth place in the first run, then rose to third after the second run. James Cove was in Salt Lake covering the Games for the BBC and was expecting a top 10 result. When Baxter took the Bronze medal, he suddently had to find a satellite truck to run the story. Before the competition he had dyed his hair in the pattern of the Saltire cross of St Andrew: the flag of Scotland. The British Olympic Association (BOA) ordered him to remove the political symbol, but the blue dye he used to try to obliterate the white saltire was a different shade, and the saltire pattern could still clearly be seen when he won his medal.

== Medal controversy ==
On 1 March, as he was leaving the Olympic village to return home, Baxter was informed by the BOA that a sample he submitted had tested positive for a restricted substance. Baxter returned home to Aviemore to a hero's welcome and a parade around the town in an open top bus. On 5 March the BOA released a statement on his behalf, revealing that he had failed a drugs test, with his urine having tested positive for the prohibited substance, methamphetamine. Baxter stated that he had not knowingly ingested, and that he would not make any further statement until the IOC's inquiry and disciplinary commissions ruled on his case. After the first sample tested positive, a disciplinary stage was expected to follow and the British Olympic Association offered their support. The International Olympic Committee (IOC) held a private two-day hearing in Lausanne, where Baxter would be able to speak, with the outcome expected the following week. On 21 March, Baxter held a press conference in London, where he offered an explanation that he believed a nasal inhaler that he had used had been the cause of the positive test. the IOC announced the decision of their executive board that Baxter was disqualified and was told to return his medal. Baxter returned the medal, for it to be awarded to Austrian Benjamin Raich.

=== Urine tests ===
Baxter had provided a urine sample immediately after the race on 23 February. Initial reports were that his urine sample contained a trace amount of methamphetamine, a banned stimulant. The BOA formally asked the IOC to carry out a split test on Baxter's sample on the basis that there are two forms of the drug. The more advanced tests showed that the substance present was levomethamphetamine, a levorotary isomer of methamphetamine, which has no significant stimulant properties. Baxter later proved the source of levomethamphetamine was from a Vicks inhaler that he had used in the United States. He had been unaware that the contents were different from those found in the UK version. The International Ski Federation accepted his explanation and on 2 June announced they would require him to serve a ban of 3 months, on the basis that this was a first offence of unintentionally using a prohibited substance. This sanction meant he would miss the first month of the 2002–03 World Cup season and an appeal was lodged in late June.

=== International Ski Federation appeal ===
The British Ski and Snowboard Federation appealed to the Court of Arbitration for Sport (CAS) and the case was heard on 30 September 2002. The appeal was successful and his ban was overturned. This gave the Baxter camp great hope for the next appeal to have his medal returned.

=== Olympic appeal ===
The British Olympic Association assisted with, and publicly funded, an appeal against the loss of his medal. In October 2002 his medal appeal was heard by the Court of Arbitration for Sport in Lausanne. The basis of the appeal was that the form of methamphetamine in the USA Vicks levomethamphetamine is an inactive isomer of methamphetamine. The CAS and the IOC agreed that he had not intentionally ingested the substance. Under the strict liability doctrine, athletes are liable if they inadvertently take any form of potentially performance-enhancing substance, and a large number of athletes have lost medals as a result. Cold cures and other over-the-counter medicines are the most common sources of trace levels of amphetamines and other stimulants. His appeal rested on whether levomethamphetamine was performance-enhancing, Vicks and other expert witnesses explained that it was a decongestant, and had negligible stimulant properties. Dr Don Catlin maintained that the banned list did not specify isomers so all forms were on the banned list and the strict liability doctrine applied. This was particularly controversial since 100 US athletes who won 19 medals tested positive for stimulants at his laboratory, and were cleared to continue competing, and Dr. Catlin was named as part of a 3-man committee that routinely allowed US Olympians such as Carl Lewis to continue competing despite failing drugs tests. The vast majority of athletes named in Wade Exum's papers tested positive for stimulants found in over-the-counter cold medicines. Most were cleared after explaining that they had taken the substances inadvertently.

The Baxter Appeal team headed by Professor Arnold Beckett, a former member of the IOC medical commission, thought Dr Catlin's position was "inconsistent". He stated, "The things we are being told about in the USA make me very angry, particularly in relation to Alain Baxter's case. He did not take a banned substance, as levomethamphetamine was not on the list, but it was Dr Catlin's evidence which the appeal committee believed."

The court upheld the IOC's decision to disqualify Baxter. The CAS judgement found that "The panel is not without sympathy for Mr Baxter, who appears to be a sincere and honest man who did not intend to obtain a competitive advantage in the race." Nevertheless, they found that his offence had been committed and as such would not reinstate the medal. In December 2002, Raich received the bronze medal.

== Return to competition ==
In October 2002, on the eve of the appeal decision, Baxter's sponsor Drambuie, announced that their continued sponsorship for him in the 2002-03 season. In 2004 he won his seventh British Slalom title, a record that was unequalled until Dave Ryding also won a seventh title in 2016.

Following the events in Salt Lake City, Baxter remained the highest-ranked male alpine skier in the United Kingdom. He received recognition from established skiing nations and was noted as a prominent figure in British alpine skiing during his career.

He competed in the 2006 Winter Olympics at Turin, where he finished 16th in the slalom.

In 2008, facing ongoing difficulties for funding, he posed naked for photographer Trevor Yerbury to produce a "tastefully nude" calendar. Affected by a chronic back injury, he announced his retirement from competitive skiing in April 2009, age 35.

== Coaching ==
Following retirement from competition, Baxter ran a ski shop and ski boot fitting service in Stirling. In February 2014 an online petition was launched to return his medal. There was renewed interest in the petition in 2016.

In May 2021, GB Snowsport announced that Baxter was to join the men's Alpine World Cup Squad, having been appointed as a high performance coach for the team.

== Other sports ==
In his youth, Baxter played ice hockey for Aviemore Blackhawks. He was offered a contract to be a professional ice hockey player but he did not take this up, opting to concentrate on skiing. He also played shinty, and turned out for Kincraig Shinty Club when that club was still active.

Baxter won the 2004 British Superstars event, defeating Du'aine Ladejo who had edged Baxter out for the 2003 title.

At the time of announcing his retirement from downhill skiing in 2009, Baxter set out plans to try track-cycling. He had some assistance from the Scottish Institute of Sport's talent transfer programme. Baxter made his debut on a track bike racing at Manchester Velodrome on 5 December 2009, in the 200m sprint in the Revolution series. He had hopes of racing in the Commonwealth Games in 2010 in Dehli but was finding it difficult to get enough track time given his other commitments, including being part of the BBC's commentary team for the 2010 Winter Olympics.

In 2015, Baxter took part in Red Bull Crashed Ice racing events in Belfast and Quebec as part of a Scottish side. He qualified for the final in Quebec but withdrew from the final after sustaining broken ribs.

== Family ==
His brother, Noel Baxter is also an alpine skier. His cousin Lesley McKenna is a leading professional snowboarder and winner of two World Cups.

Baxter married businesswoman Sheila Dow in 2006, after the two met at Finlay Mickel's wedding the previous year. They have three children.

== Honours ==
In 2014, the decision was taken to name a housing development in Aviemore in his honour. "Alain Baxter Court" opened the following year.
