= Peter English =

Professor Peter English (9 March 1937 – 3 January 2009) was a scientist, shinty player, and social historian from Lochletter, Glen Urquhart, situated by the shores of Loch Ness in Highland, Scotland.

== Career ==
English was an expert in agricultural science, particularly in the field of animal welfare. He was an employee of Aberdeen University from 1961 until 2002, eventually attaining the position of professor of animal science and husbandry in 1998. Additionally, he was on the UK Farm Animal Welfare Council for nine years.

His book The Sow - Improving Her Efficiency has been translated into 23 languages.

== Shinty ==
English was well regarded for his contributions to the sport of shinty. As a young man, he played in a successful Glenurquhart Shinty Club side in the 1950s and early 1960s before moving to Aberdeen, where he was a founder of Aberdeen Camanachd and the Aberdeen University Shinty Club.

His significant contribution to the game of shinty was the establishment of the Shinty Yearbook in 1971, with its publication continues to this day. He was also a vice-president of the Camanachd Association, the governing body of shinty, for 10 years.

As well as his writings about agriculture and shinty, he also authored a history of Loch Hourn and Arnisdale. Before his death, he had returned to Glen Urquhart, where he was once again involved with the Glenurquhart Shinty Club.

== Works ==
- The Sow - Improving Her Efficiency (Ipswich: Farming Press, 1977) ISBN 9780852360811
- Glen Urquhart : Its Places, People, Neighbours and Its Shinty in the Last 100 Years and More (Aberdeen: Arnisdale, 1985) OCLC 13398228
- The Growing and Finishing Pig [et al.] (Ipswich: Farming Press, 1988) ISBN 9780852361382
- Stockmanship : Improving the Care of the Pig and Other Livestock [et al.] (Ipswich: Farming Press, 1992) ISBN 9780852362365
- Arnisdale and Loch Hourn : The Clachans, People, Memories and the Future (Arnisdale and Loch Hourn Community Council, 2000) ISBN 9780953969609
- A Bridge to the Past : An Oral History of Families of Upper GlenUrquhart (Inverness : Speedprint, 2009) ISBN 9780956454904
