= Grand Slam (shinty) =

Trophy winning accomplishment in shinty

The Grand Slam in shinty consists of a club winning all four major trophies for which it is eligible. These are at present the Premier Division, the Camanachd Cup, the MacAulay Cup and either the MacTavish Cup or the Glasgow Celtic Society Cup, according to whether a club is from the North or South District.

== History ==
When the term "Grand Slam" was first used in relation to shinty is unsure. The term was first used for golf in the 1930s. The MacAulay Cup was first played for in 1947, and this can be gauged as the beginning of the Grand Slam era.

Although both Ballachulish and Lovat have won the Glasgow Celtic Society and MacTavish Cups respectively, this was outside a Grand Slam season (Balla's win was before the advent of the MacAulay Cup) although Lovat won the first Grand Slam two years later, in 1953.

Kingussie won three Grand Slams in a row in the late 1990s.

The trophies involved in winning the Grand Slam have developed with the advent of the national Premier Division replacing the South Division One and the North Division One.

== Club Slam ==
A Club Slam is when a club has secured all the trophies in the sport for which they eligible to compete. Kinlochshiel achieved this in 2021 when they added the Camanachd and MacTavish to their 2016 & 2018 MacAulay and 2017 Premiership wins.

Due to the district division of shinty in Scotland into North and South, a "National Slam" has only been achieved by Lovat who have won all five major trophies - the Camanachd, the MacAulay, the MacTavish and the MacGillvray League (North One), when this functioned as the tier one league as well as the Glasgow Celtic Society as an invited club. Lovat has never won the Tier One league in the era of national shinty, however. Ballachulish have likewise won the MacTavish Cup, but this was in 1952, after the invention of the MacAulay Cup; five years earlier, this might have qualified them for a Club Slam.

== Grand Slam winning teams ==
Club	Total	Years
Kingussie	8	1984, 1988, 1997, 1998, 1999, 2003, 2022, 2024
Newtonmore	3	1972, 1975, 1985
Lovat	1	1953
Kyles Athletic	1	1966
