= Strathglass Shinty Club =

- Full name: Strathglass Shinty Club
- Gaelic name: Comunn Camanachd Straghlais
- Nickname: The Strath, Na Glaisich
- Founded: 1879
- Ground: Playing Fields, Cannich
- Manager: Allan MacLeod
- League: National Division
- 2025: 8th
- Reserve Manager: Charles Hall
- League: North Division Two
- 2025: 9th
Home

Strathglass Shinty Club, or "Comunn Camanachd Straghlais" in Scottish Gaelic, is a shinty club from Cannich, Inverness-shire. The club was founded in 1879, and played a major role in the development of the rules of the sport. The first team played in the National Division in 2025 and has played in the Premiership in the past. The club restarted its second team in 2017, and there is a successful women's team, started in 2006.

== History ==
Strathglass competed in the fixture considered to be the origin of the rules that apply today in modern shinty against Glenurquhart Shinty Club at Bught Park, Inverness on 12 February 1887. Glenurquhart won the game, played with 22 players on each side, 2–0. This fixture was to be repeated on 12 January 2007 in Inverness as the opening centrepiece of the Highland 2007 celebrations in Scotland. However, despite two attempts to play the fixture, one in 2007 (as an opener to the celebrations) and the next in 2008 (as a closer) both were cancelled due to inclement weather. The trophy from this cancelled game has been repurposed for the restored National Division One.

This ancient rivalry is still continued with the clubs' first teams usually playing each year for the MacDonald Cup and second teams for the Ali Bhan Cup as a curtain raiser to the new season.

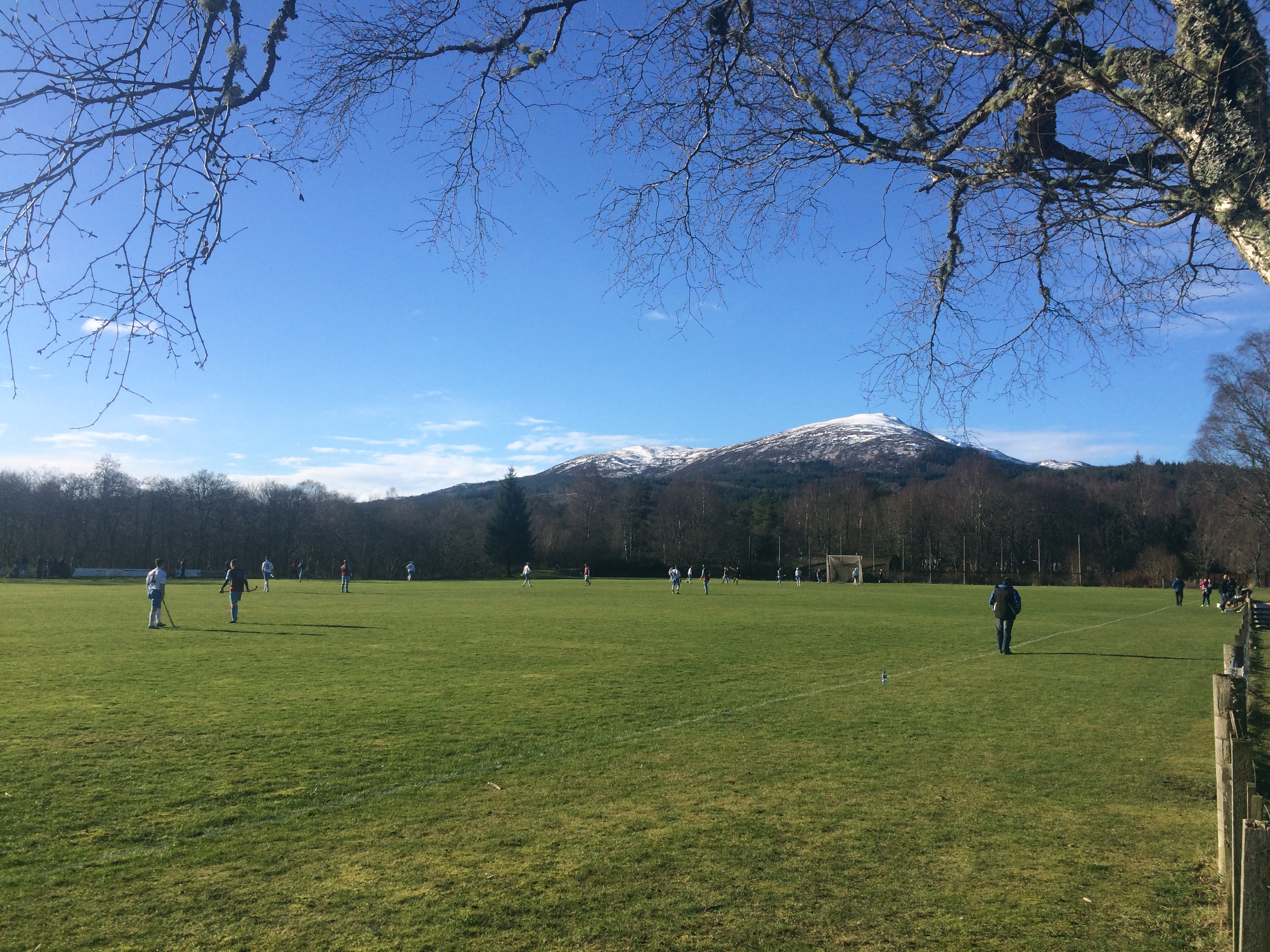
Shinty Pitch at Cannich

The club won the Strathdearn Cup in 1929, 1967 and 1983. They became the first North area team to win the Balliemore Cup in 1986 and went on to win this trophy on two further occasions in 2003 and 2009.

The club made history by going from North Division One to National Division One to the Premier Division in straight seasons. The club held its own in the top tier in 2006 and 2007 but was relegated in 2008. Robert Geddes stood down at the end of the 2008 season after ten years at the helm. Geddes was replaced by Garry Reid for the 2009 season.

The club has never made it to the Camanachd Cup final, most recently falling at the semi-final stage to Inveraray on 25 August 2007. The club won the Balliemore Cup for the third time in 2009 by defeating Kinlochshiel 5–1 at the Meadows in Rothesay. Garry Reid stepped down at the end of the season and was replaced by Brian MacKay, the second team manager to that point. He was replaced, in turn, by Steve Harvey.

After a terrible season, which saw them struggle to field their second team, Strathglass ended up at the bottom of North Division One. The club avoided relegation after the Camanachd Association was convinced not to hold a winner-takes-all playoff with North Division Two team, Glengarry.

Robert Geddes was reappointed manager of the first team for the 2012 season. Callum Duff, a former player, returned to the club as an assistant in 2012 but became manager for the 2013 season. This was also accompanied with a recruitment drive to improve on Strathglass' recent poor form. However, Duff did not last and the players had to take on the management role themselves. The club re-established itself in North One, and finished a close second to Newtonmroe in 2016 under Dave Balharry's management. Balharry continued in post into 2017 as Strathglass successfully petitioned to be promoted to the National Division structure.

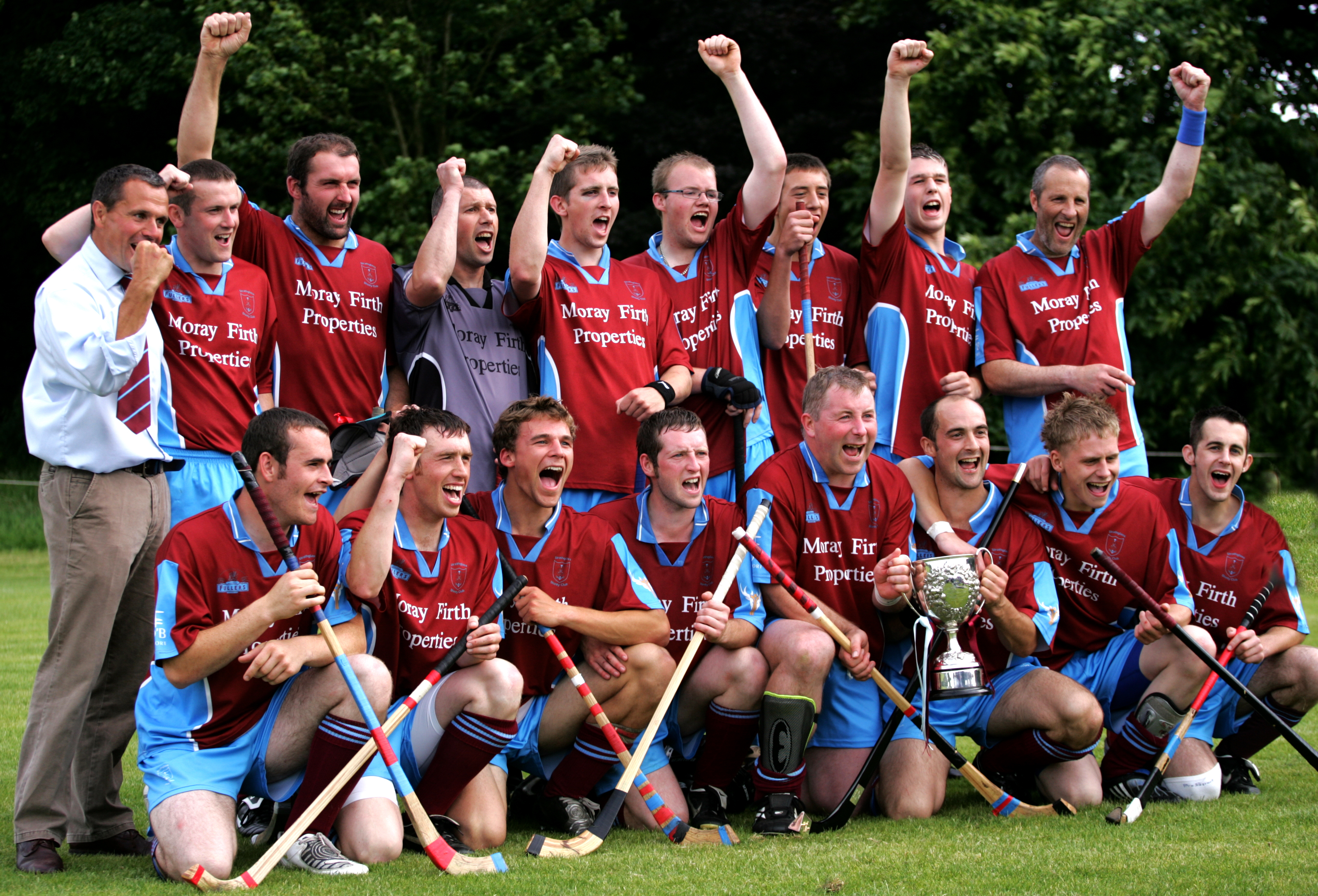
Strathglass Winners in 2009

The club has struggled to field a strong second team in recent years, in 2014 the club decided to withdraw the reserves from league competition but still compete in cup competition. The club restarted their second team on a full-time basis in 2017.

2013 was a successful year for the women's side with them lifting the Challenge Cup for sides outside the National Division. This good form was continued in 2014 when they retained their title, and 2015 saw them crowned National 2 League Winners.
