= MacTavish Cup =

The MacTavish Cup is a knock-out cup competition in the sport of shinty. It is competed for by senior teams from the North of Scotland district. It is one of the five trophies considered to be part of the Grand Slam in the sport of shinty. The current holders are Newtonmore. The competition is currently sponsored by cottages.com.

The final is habitually played at the Bught Park, Inverness.

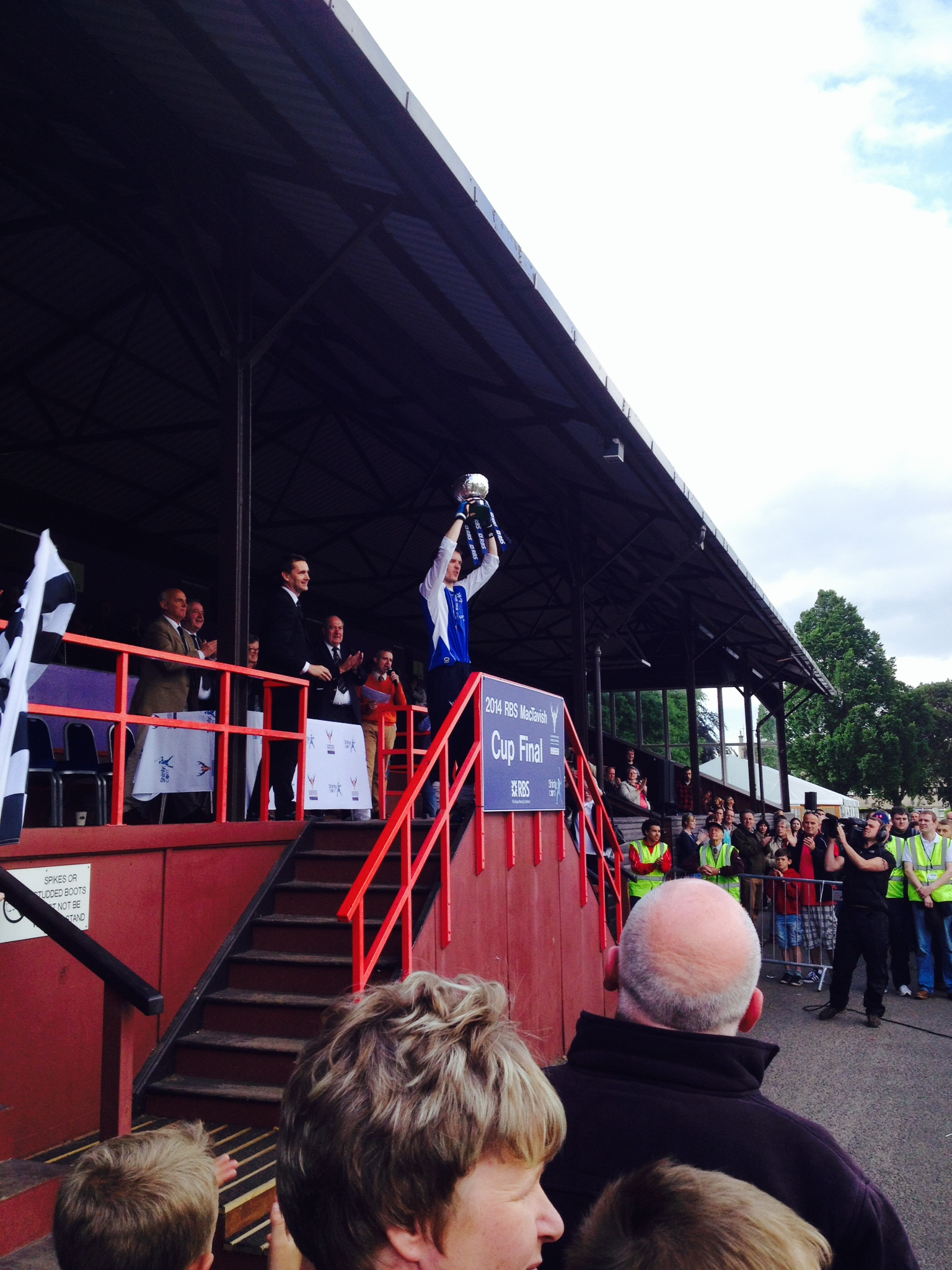
The MacTavish Cup, lifted by Lovat in 2014

== History ==
The trophy is a rose bowl presented by Duncan MacTavish of Stratherrick in 1898 and the first competition was played that year and was won by Skye Camanachd.

The final was televised for the first time in 2009 by BBC Alba. The 2009 winners were Newtonmore Camanachd, managed by Norman MacArthur.

As of 2010, the opening rounds of the cup were to be played midweek, in order to reduce the backlog of fixtures that has regularly afflicted shinty. This caused major controversy and Skye Camanachd sent an official letter of complaint to the Camanachd Association. However, this decision was reversed and midweek fixtures were reserved for junior level cups.

The 2010 final was played between Kingussie and Kilmallie, who upset Fort William to reach the final. The game was a magnificent advert for shinty and was won 5-4 by Kingussie. It was broadcast live on BBC 2 Scotland.

In 2014, the MacTavish Plate was established for teams losing in the first round. Fort William triumphed 2-1 over Skye Camanachd in the first final at Craigard, Invergarry.

Only 5 clubs have managed to retain the trophy. Newtonmore being the most recent in 2016 and 2017, however Kingussie and Newtonmore have both done it multiple times both dominating for long periods. Fort Augustus and Inverness have both also successfully defended the trophy both doing so before The Great War.

Glenurquhart won the cup in 2015, defeating Newtonmore. This was notable not only for being their first victory in the competition but having lost the previous two finals to Lovat, as well as the 2008 final to Kingussie.

The 2018 final saw Newtonmore comeback from a goal down to defeat 2017 Premiership League champions Kinlochshiel 2-1 in a closely fought encounter at the Bught Park, Inverness. The match was shown live on BBC Alba.

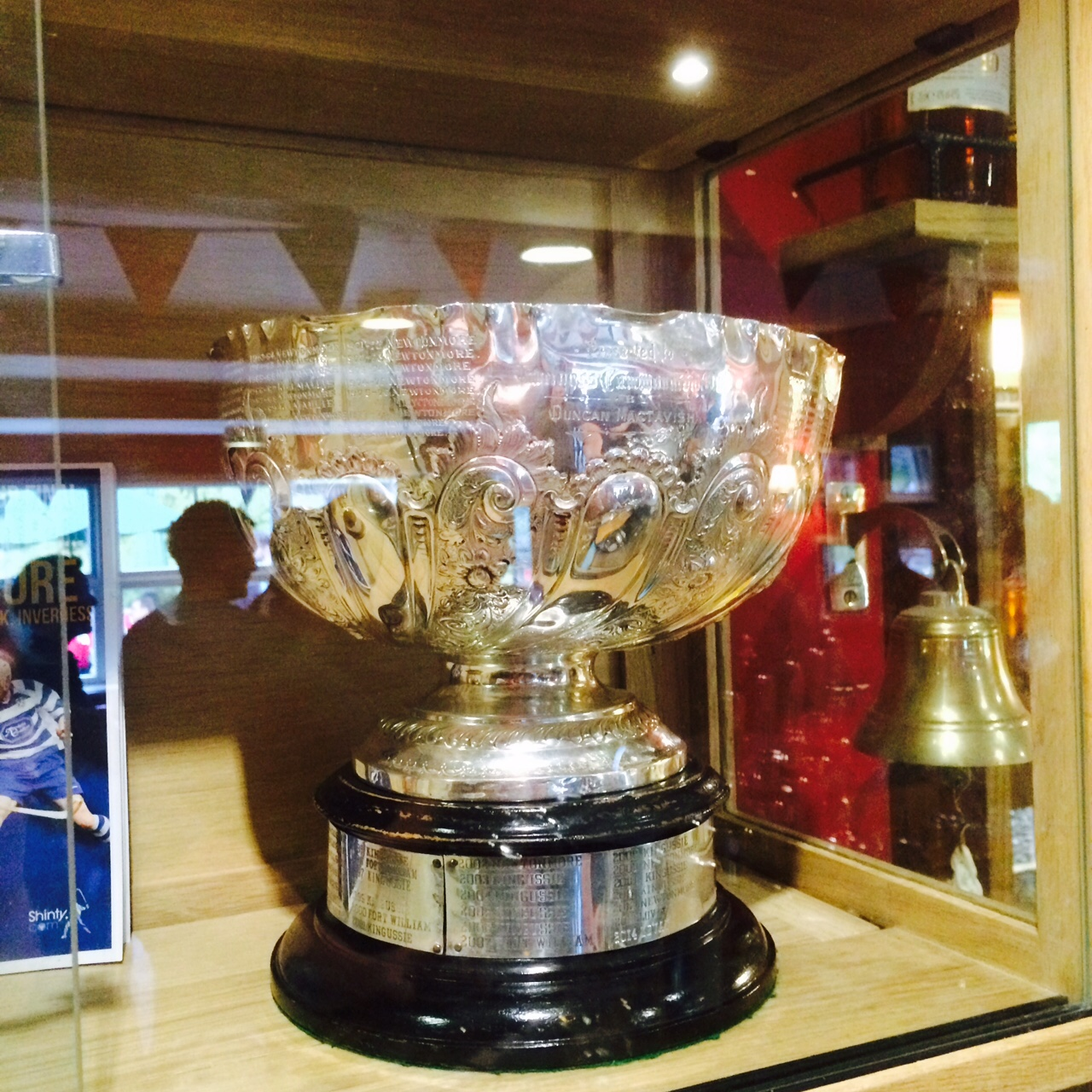
The MacTavish Cup in Drumnadrochit 2015

== List of winners ==
- 2026 Kingussie 2, Newtonmore 0
- 2025 Kingussie 2, Lovat 0
- 2024 Kingussie 3, Fort William 1
- 2023 Kingussie 1, Skye Camanachd 0
- 2022 Kingussie 5, Caberfeidh 2
- 2021 Kinlochshiel 3, Kingussie 2
- 2019 Newtonmore 3, Glenurquhart 0
- 2018 Newtonmore 2, Kinlochsheil 1
- 2017 Newtonmore 3, Kilmallie 2
- 2016 Newtonmore 2, Lochaber 1
- 2015 Glenurquhart 3, Newtonmore 1
- 2014 Lovat 5, Glenurquhart 1
- 2013 Lovat 1, Glenurquhart 1 (a.e.t.); Lovat won 3-1 on penalties.
- 2012 Newtonmore 5, Lochaber 1
- 2011 Kingussie 2, Fort William 1
- 2010 Kingussie 5, Kilmallie 4 (a.e.t.)
- 2009 Newtonmore 5, Kingussie 4
- 2008 Kingussie 6, Glenurquhart 1
- 2007 Fort William 1, Kingussie 0
- 2006 Kingussie 5, Fort William 2 (a.e.t.)
- 2005 Kingussie 6, Newtonmore 1
- 2004 Kingussie
- 2003 Kingussie
- 2002 Newtonmore
- 2001 Kingussie
- 2000 Fort William
- 1999 Kingussie
- 1998 Kingussie
- 1997 Kingussie
- 1996 Fort William
- 1995 Kingussie
- 1994 Kingussie
- 1993 Kingussie
- 1992 Kingussie
- 1991 Kingussie
- 1990 Kingussie
- 1989 Kingussie
- 1988 Kingussie
- 1987 Newtonmore
- 1986 Newtonmore
- 1985 Newtonmore
- 1984 Kingussie
- 1983 Newtonmore
- 1982 Kingussie
- 1981 Kingussie
- 1980 Newtonmore
- 1979 Newtonmore
- 1978 Newtonmore
- 1977 Newtonmore
- 1976 Newtonmore
- 1975 Newtonmore
- 1974 Newtonmore
- 1973 Newtonmore
- 1972 Newtonmore
- 1971 Newtonmore
- 1970 Newtonmore
- 1969 Kilmallie
- 1968 Newtonmore
- 1967 Kilmallie
- 1966 Newtonmore
- 1965 Kingussie
- 1964 Newtonmore
- 1963 Newtonmore
- 1962 Kingussie
- 1961 Kilmallie
- 1960 Newtonmore
- 1959 Kilmallie
- 1958 Newtonmore
- 1957 Kingussie
- 1956 Newtonmore
- 1955 Newtonmore
- 1954 Newtonmore
- 1953 Lovat
- 1952 Ballachulish
- 1951 Newtonmore
- 1950 Newtonmore
- 1949 Lovat
- 1948 Ballachulish
- 1947 Lovat
- 1939 Newtonmore
- 1938 Ballachulish
- 1937 Caberfeidh
- 1936 Newtonmore
- 1935 Caberfeidh
- 1934 Caberfeidh
- 1933 Spean Bridge
- 1932 Caberfeidh
- 1931 Newtonmore
- 1930 Newtonmore
- 1929 Newtonmore
- 1928 Lovat
- 1927 Newtonmore
- 1926 Lovat
- 1925 Spean Bridge
- 1924 Newtonmore
- 1923 Newtonmore
- 1922 Spean Bridge
- 1921 Kingussie
- 1920 Newtonmore
- 1914 Kingussie
- 1913 Beauly
- 1912 Inverness
- 1911 Inverness
- 1910 Fort Augustus
- 1909 Fort Augustus
- 1908 Wester Ross
- 1907 Inverness
- 1906 Lovat
- 1905 Beauly
- 1904 No Competition
- 1903 No Competition
- 1902 Newtonmore
- 1901 Kingussie
- 1900 Laggan
- 1899 Beauly
- 1898 Skye Camanachd

=== Table of winners ===
Club	Total	Years
Newtonmore	42	1902, 1920, 1923, 1924, 1927, 1929, 1930, 1931, 1936, 1939, 1950, 1951, 1954, 1955, 1956, 1958, 1960, 1963, 1964, 1966, 1968, 1970, 1971, 1972, 1973, 1974, 1975, 1976, 1977, 1978, 1979, 1980, 1983, 1985, 1986, 1987, 2002, 2009, 2012, 2016, 2017, 2018, 2019
Kingussie	32	1901, 1914, 1957, 1962, 1965, 1981, 1982, 1984, 1988, 1989, 1990, 1991, 1992, 1993, 1994, 1995, 1997, 1998, 1999, 2001, 2003, 2004, 2005, 2006, 2008, 2010, 2011, 2022, 2023, 2024, 2025, 2026
Lovat	8	1906, 1926, 1928, 1947, 1949, 1953, 2013, 2014
Caberfeidh	4	1932, 1934, 1935, 1937
Kilmallie	4	1959, 1961, 1967, 1969
Beauly	3	1899, 1905, 1913
Inverness	3	1907, 1911, 1912
Kinlochshiel	1	2021
Spean Bridge	3	1922, 1925, 1933
Ballachulish	3	1938, 1948, 1952
Fort William	3	1996, 2000, 2007
Fort Augustus	2	1909, 1910
Skye	1	1898
Laggan	1	1900
Wester Ross	1	1908
Glenurquhart	1	2015
