= North Division Two (shinty) =

Shinty league

Mowi North Division Two
- Country: Scotland
- Confederation: Camanachd Association
- Number of clubs: 10
- Level on pyramid: 4
- Promotion to: North Division One
- Current champions: Caberfeidh (2025)
- Website: www.shinty.com

The North Division Two, currently known as the Mowi North Division 2 for sponsorship reasons, is the fourth tier of the men's shinty league system. The champions compete for the MacGillivray Junior Cup and are promoted to the North Division One.

Due to the folding of North Division Three no relegation currently takes place.

== Current teams ==
The 2025 North Division 2 consisted of the following teams:

* Denotes reserve team

- Aberdeen University Shinty Club
- Boleskine Camanachd
- Caberfeidh 2nd*
- Inverness Shinty Club 2nd*
- Kilmallie Shinty Club 2nd*
- Lewis Camanachd (Comann Camanachd Leòdhais)
- Lochaber 2nd*
- Lochcarron Camanachd
- Lovat Shinty Club 2nd*
- Strathglass Shinty Club*

== History ==
1996 to 1999: North Division Two becomes the third tier with the creation of a Premier Division.

1999 to 2006: North Division Two becomes the fourth tier of the league system with the advent of the National Division One.

2007 to 2014: North Division Two once again becomes the third tier of Shinty

2014: North Division two returns to being the fourth tier of Shinty.

== List of winners since 2014 ==
- 2014 – Newtonmore Camanachd Club 2nd
- 2015 – Skye Camanachd 2nd
- 2016 – Aberdeen University Shinty Club
- 2017 – Glengarry Shinty Club
- 2018 – Lovat Shinty Club 2nd
- 2019 – Lochcarron Camanachd
- 2020 – No season due to the COVID-19 pandemic
- 2021 – Regional league system (Note: A system of regional leagues replaced all Shinty leagues during 2021 in order to reduce distances teams travelled due to the COVID-19 pandemic. Premiership clubs were placed in one of three senior leagues of six teams each.)
- 2022 – Beauly Shinty Club 2nd
- 2023 – Lochcarron Camanachd
- 2024 – Kingussie Camanachd 2nd
- 2025 – Caberfeidh 2nd
