= Premier Division (shinty) =

Shinty league

Mowi Premiership
- Founded: 1996
- Country: Scotland
- Confederation: Camanachd Association
- Number of clubs: 10
- Level on pyramid: 1
- Relegation to: National Division
- Current champions: Kingussie Camanachd (2025)
- Most championships: Kingussie Camanachd (17 titles)
- Website: www.shinty.com

The Premier Division, known for sponsorship reasons as the Mowi Premiership, is the top division in men's competitive shinty in Scotland. Formed in 1996, the league is the top tier of the shinty league system and was set up in order to create a Scotland-wide league for the first time. It constitutes one of the trophies considered to be part of the Grand Slam of shinty.

The 2025 title was won by Kingussie Camanachd, who won it for the fourth successive season.

== Sponsorship ==
From 2009 until 2011, the league was sponsored by Scottish Hydro Electric before Orion Group took over for the 2012 season. The league was rebranded under the current 'Premiership' branding with Marine Harvest taking over sponsorship at the beginning of the 2015 season. In 2019, Marine Harvest rebranded as Mowi ASA, with the league being known as the Mowi Premiership.

== Teams ==
The 2025 premiership consisted of the following teams:

- Beauly Shinty Club
- Caberfeidh Camanachd Club
- Kingussie Camanachd
- Kinlochshiel Shinty Club
- Kyles Athletic Shinty Club
- Fort William Shinty Club
- Lovat Shinty Club
- Newtonmore Camanachd Club
- Oban Camanachd
- Skye Camanachd

== History ==
1996: The then Premier Division had its inaugural season. Prior to its founding the winners of North Division One and South Division One played in a National Final.

1999: Promotion and Relegation between Premier Division and National Division One adopted

2003: An interim league system contested while the Shinty League system transitioned from being played during winter months to summer months.

2004: The Premier Division becomes a summer season league.

2006: National Division One folded at end of season ending Promotion and Relegation. Fort William break Kingussie's dominance dated back to 1986 by taking home the Premier Division title.

2007: Kingussie recapture the Premier Division.

2009: Title won on final weekend by Kingussie on goal difference. Newtonmore finishing second.

2010: For the second consecutive year league decided on final weekend through goal difference. A dramatic final round game between Fort William and Newtonmore saw Newtonmore victors and champions after an 80th-minute goal by Danny MacRae.

2011: Newtonmore become first team other than Kingussie to retain the Premier Division. Kyles Athletic title dreams dashed with final minute goal along with hopes of being first South team to win the league.

2014: National Division One reinstated along with the pyramid system (Promotion and Relegation).

2016: Newtonmore make it seven in a row having also won the Camanachd Cup and MacTavish Cup.

2017: Newtonmore lost their first league match in two years. Kinlochshiel won their inaugural championship to become only the second club from outside Badenoch to win the title.

2018: Newtonmore Camanachd recapture the Premier Division title.

2019: Kingussie win their first title for ten years.

2024: Kingussie win the league undefeated, making it three in a row

== List of champions ==
- 1996 – Kingussie Camanachd
- 1997 – Kingussie Camanachd
- 1998 – Kingussie Camanachd
- 1999 – Kingussie Camanachd
- 2000 – Kingussie Camanachd
- 2001 – Kingussie Camanachd
- 2002 – Kingussie Camanachd
- 2003 – (Interim leagues while transitioning from winter to summer season)
- 2004 – Kingussie Camanachd
- 2005 – Kingussie Camanachd
- 2006 – Fort William Shinty Club
- 2007 – Kingussie Camanachd
- 2008 – Kingussie Camanachd
- 2009 – Kingussie Camanachd
- 2010 – Newtonmore Camanachd Club
- 2011 – Newtonmore Camanachd Club
- 2012 – Newtonmore Camanachd Club
- 2013 – Newtonmore Camanachd Club
- 2014 – Newtonmore Camanachd Club
- 2015 – Newtonmore Camanachd Club
- 2016 – Newtonmore Camanachd Club
- 2017 – Kinlochshiel Shinty Club
- 2018 – Newtonmore Camanachd Club
- 2019 – Kingussie Camanachd
- 2020 – No season due to the COVID-19 pandemic
- 2021 – Regional league system (Note: A system of regional leagues replaced all shinty leagues during 2021 in order to reduce distances teams travelled due to the COVID-19 pandemic. Premiership clubs were placed in one of three senior leagues of six teams each.)
- 2022 – Kingussie Camanachd
- 2023 – Kingussie Camanachd
- 2024 – Kingussie Camanachd
- 2025 – Kingussie Camanachd

== Total titles won ==
As of 8 November 2025

Team	Titles	Last title	Note
Kingussie Camanachd	17	2025	Current champions
Newtonmore Camanachd Club	8	2018	
Fort William Shinty Club	1	2006	
Kinlochshiel Shinty Club	1	2017	
