= Caberfeidh =

Scottish shinty team

- Full name: Caberfeidh Camanachd Club
- Gaelic name: Comann Camanachd Cabar Feidh
- Nickname: Cabers
- Founded: 1886
- Ground: Castle Leod, Strathpeffer
- Manager: Lee Nicol
- League: Premiership
- 2025: 6th
- Reserve Manager: Andrew MacMaster
- League: North Division Two
- 2025: 1st
Home

Caberfeidh Camanachd Club is a shinty team based in Strathpeffer, Ross and Cromarty, Scotland. The club play in the Premiership having been promoted from the National Division after the 2017 season. The club's 2nd team play in North Division 2.

The name Caberfeidh comes from the Scottish Gaelic for a stag's antlers, Cabar Fèidh, which is the symbol of Ross-shire.

== History ==
The club was founded in 1886 in the Spa Pavilion in Strathpeffer, celebrating its 125th anniversary in 2011. It was an amalgamation of the Strathpeffer club and the Knockfarrel club Caberfeidh Shinty Club 125th Anniversary Celebrations « Shinty. The name "Caberfeidh" was proposed by W.F. Gunn, who also represented the club at the inaugural AGM of the Camanachd Association.Caberfeidh Shinty Club’s 125th Anniversary « Shinty

In the early 1920s, the club became a junior side for two years due to a dearth of experienced players after the Great War but in 1926 the club defeated Beauly in the MacGillivray Cup Final and this began a glory run which lasted until the Second World War.

The club won the Camanachd Cup in 1934 and 1939 and also lost in the final to Kyles Athletic in 1935.Caberfeidh Shinty Club’s 125th Anniversary « Shinty They also won the MacGillivray League ten years in succession, winning 11 in total. They also appeared in eight MacTavish Cup finals, winning four. Indeed, the club's domination of the sport was so complete that one newspaper used the headline "No Other Worlds Left To Conquer".Caberfeidh Shinty Club’s 125th Anniversary « Shinty

After the war, the club was still successful although it never reached its intra-war heights again. The only comparable phase of domination was in the 1990s when the club won five successive Balliemore Cups, the intermediate championship.

== 2000s ==
In 2008, the club finished bottom of North Division One but were not relegated due to Fort William Seconds not being eligible for promotion to that league. In 2009, the club improved vastly and at one point looked to be making a push for promotion, however, they finished a satisfactory 5th place in the league as they bid farewell to their old clubhouse.

The club renovated their pavilion with assistance from Sportscotland. The club opened its new clubhouse in 2010 with a gala day involving a Cabers Over 40s v A Rest of the World Select as well as a Rock concert by Achnasheen Airport and Fash Stewart.Caberfeidh Camanachd Club

In 2011, the club reached the Balliemore Final again, but lost 2–0 to Bute in Portree. They hosted the final in 2012 between Lochaber and Beauly. A third-place finished saw them take the final North spot in the reseurrected National Division One.

Calum Macdonald of Runrig is a supporter. His son Donald is a past-player for the club. Runrig song Clash of the Ash mentions Caberfeidh's Iain - Weed - McCall in the line, " Weed to the wing'. Caberfeidh is the one shinty club in Scotland which groundshares with a cricket club, sharing Castle Leod with Ross County C.C. Another notable player of recent times is Kevin Bartlett. A top performer for the Scotland national side, Bartlett came through the Caberfeidh youth system and was a key player in the Cabers team until a move to Premier Division side Lovat for the 2013 season. A recent player to follow in Bartlett's footsteps is Blair Morrison, who has played for the Scotland national side at different youth levels.

The club is a distinct but fraternal organisation from the Ross-shire Camanachd Association, which always holds its annual youth Six-A-Sides at Castle Leod.

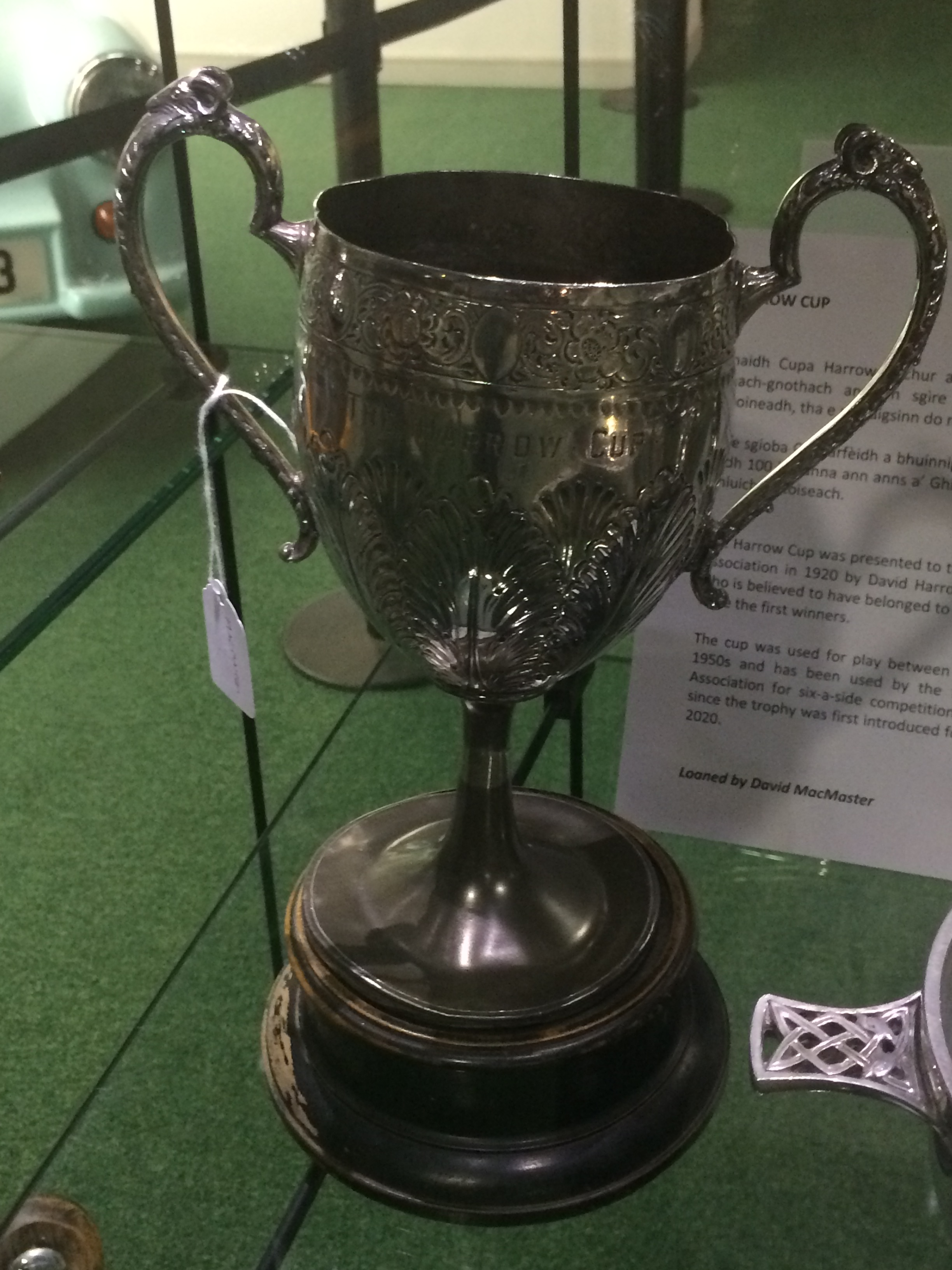
The Harrow Cup – played for at the Ross-shire Camanachd Sixes
