= Glengarry Shinty Club =

Glengarry
- Full name: Glengarry Shinty Club
- Gaelic name: Comann Camanachd Ghleann Gharaidh
- Nickname: The Garry / The Garry Girls
- Founded: 1976
- Ground: Craigard Park, Invergarry
- Manager: Ewen Cameron
- League: North Division One
- 2016: 7th
Home

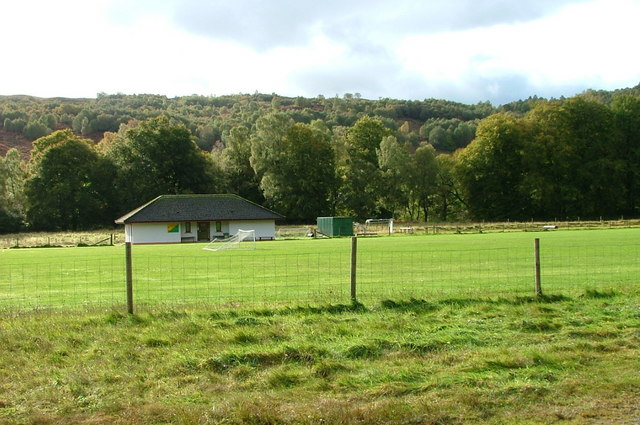
The pitch and clubhouse sit just outside the village of Invergarry

Glengarry Shinty Club is a shinty team from Invergarry, Inverness-shire, Scotland. The club has played in its present form since 1976. There is one senior team, competing in North Division Two . The club also runs a highly successful women's team.

== History ==
A club called Glengarry played against Fort Augustus in 1882 and was active in the 1930s. However, in 1948 the club amalgamated with Fort Augustus and became Inveroich. The club was reconstituted as Glengarry in 1976 and has continued to this day. The club won the Balliemore Cup in 1988 and 1989 and also reached the final of the men's Valerie Fraser Cup in 1990 and 1991.

In 2010, the club led North Division Two for much of the season but were overhauled by Glenurquhart. The Drumnadrochit team turned down the opportunity to gain promotion and Glengarry were also offered the option. But they wanted a play-off against Strathglass to test themselves but Strathglass had been given an assurance that their place in North Division One was secure, the Garry therefore turned down promotion.

The men's team now competes in North Division One, and lifted the Chieftain's Cup in 2023 and 2024.

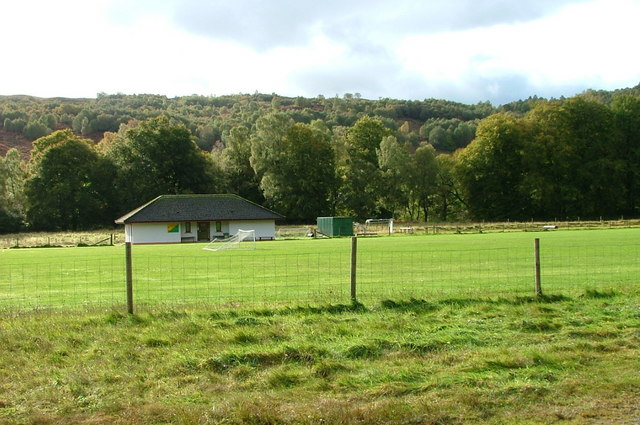
Craigard Park

Craigard park is a popular venue for semi-finals and juvenile finals. The park was constructed with assistance from the Laird of Glengarry and also hosts the Invergarry Highland Games.

Glengarry Shinty Club has produced some fine players. James Clark was originally a Garry player before he became a talisman in the successful Fort William sides of the 1900s and 2000s. Matthew Clark joined the club at the age of 12 and has come through the ranks to become one of few ambassadors for the sport. In 2009 he took his Glengarry side to meet Newtonmore in the final of the Joal Toal six-a-sides at Spean Bridge. Steven "DD" Cameron played for Scotland and his family are inextricably linked with the Glengarry Club.

== Ladies shinty ==
In 1997, Glengarry established what was then one of only three teams in Women's Shinty. The club has become the most successful in the short history of competitive women's shinty. They host the Johnstone Trophy, an indoor five-a-side tournament in Fort William every winter.

Glengarry player Karen Cameron is the former president of the Women's Camanachd Association.
