= Boleskine Camanachd =

Boleskine
- Full name: Boleskine Camanachd Club
- Gaelic name: Comann Camanachd Bhoth Fhleasgainn
- Nickname: The Wasps
- Founded: 1927
- Ground: Smith Park, Inverarnie
- Manager: Graham Black
- League: North Division Two
- 2025: 10th
Home

Boleskine Camanachd is a shinty club from Loch Ness-side, Scotland. They play in North Division Two. The club in its present form has existed as such since 1953.

== History ==
Boleskine Camanachd has been in existence in one form or another for over 100 years. Initially called Stratherrick, the team played at various venues throughout the Stratherrick area, a glen which lies barely two miles to the south of the village of Foyers, running parallel with The Great Glen. A team from Foyers was formed in 1898 after the completion of The British Aluminium production works at the village in 1894. These teams ran concurrently and met on many occasions over the period leading up to the first amalgamation of these teams in the late summer of 1927. It was hoped that a local team would be produced from the amalgamation, which could take on the best in Scottish shinty.

Stratherrick had been a member of the senior ranks in shinty since 1920, but without making a sustained impact on the game at national level and for a first few years of the twenties had also fielded a successful junior team. Foyers had also contested in both the senior and junior ranks, competing in the Camanachd Cup for five years since 1921 and the MacTavish Cup since 1920. Their junior side had been successful in the Strathdearn cup and the feeling locally was that a combination of the best players from each club, would be hard to match at any level of shinty! The resulting team was called Boleskine.

The newly formed team reached the final of the Camanachd Cup in their very first season, 1928, going down heavily to Kyles Athletic by 6 goals to 2 at Glasgow, despite leading by 2 goals to 1 in the first half. The club continued in the senior shinty ranks reaching three consecutive senior shinty finals in the early thirties. Despite this apparent strength Boleskine was technically dissolved in early 1934 when a breakaway team called Foyers entered and won the Strathdearn cup. Season 1934–35 Foyers reformed and rejoined the junior ranks, Stratherrick reformed in 1936–37 season, both continuing to play as separate entities until the Second World War. Following the war Stratherrick and their near neighbours to the east, Strathnairn, combined to form Straths Athletic who, along with the reformed Foyers team played in Junior competitions over the next few seasons.

At the start of season 1953–54 the teams again amalgamated to form Boleskine and have competed since that date under this name. The team has remained as one unit and has drawn its players from the surrounding areas covered by the individual teams.

The club went into abeyance for a year in the 1970s but Jim Chisholm, who died in 2011, was a driving force in ensuring the club rejoined the leagues within a year.

During the eighties and into the early nineties the team was mostly made up from local players, the last generation to be born in the area when the British Aluminium or The Hydro Electric Board, brought full employment to the area. In the last few years some of the older players have been forced to retire from the game but have remained within the club structure. With this experience and dedication to the local team, they have begun to implement a youth team development policy, encouraging local youngsters to take up the sport with the aim of nurturing home grown talent.

In season 2002–03 the club moved from the area's traditional, yet deteriorating, home since the fifties, Factory Field, Foyers, to a new purpose-built shinty field at Smith Park, Inverarnie.

In 2007 the senior team was relegated to North Division Three and finished third in that league in 2008. They finished 6th in 2009 and Bob Black was replaced by Gus Fraser as manager.

The club made a strong league challenge in 2012, coming second to a strong Beauly side. Lewis Smith was named North Three Player of the Year. In 2013, a third-place finish allowed Boleskine promotion to the new-look North Division Two.
