= Fort William Shinty Club =

Scottish shinty club

Fort William
- Full name: Fort William Shinty Club
- Gaelic name: Comann Camanachd A' Ghearasdain
- Nickname: The Fort
- Founded: 1893
- Ground: An Aird, Inverlochy, Fort William
- Manager: Scott McNeil
- League: Premiership
- 2025: 4th
- Reserve Manager: Scott MacNeil & Bryan Simpson
- League: North Division One
- 2025: 1st
Home	Away

Fort William Shinty Club is a shinty club from Fort William, Lochaber, Scotland. The club has two sides in the Shinty league system, a first team which played in the Premiership and a reserve side in North Division One. The first team were Camanachd Cup holders four times in succession, between 2007 and 2010, but were knocked out in the second round in 2011. The club also has a vibrant youth system.

The club's traditional home is in the heart of the town at An Aird which is an area often under threat from development. However, for much of 2011 and 2012 An Aird was being renovated and the club were tenants at the Black Parks in Inverlochy.

== History ==
Fort William was officially constituted in 1893 but the club slowly emerged into the sport and only entered the Camanachd Cup in 1912. The club folded on occasion in the 1900s and 1920s and had very little success except a Camanachd Cup semi final in 1937 against Oban Celtic and a sprinkling of junior cups.

Unfortunately for the club, the rise of Fort William as a force in shinty coincided with the 20-year dominance of Kingussie. However, the club heralded its arrival as a major force by winning the Macaulay Cup in 1991 and reaching the semi-final of the Camanachd the same year then finally joining the ranks of clubs who have won the blue riband event in 1992, beating Kingussie 1–0 in Glasgow thanks to Deek Cameron's goal after only ten seconds, which still stands as the fastest goal in a final.

Fort continued to perform well and reached the final in 1994 where they lost to Kyles Athletic. The new millennium saw Fort William habitually come in second behind the unstoppable Kingussie team and began to be seen as the team most likely to break the Badenoch dominance.

== Kingussie's dominance broken ==
The Fort reappeared in the Camanachd Cup Final in 2003 but was defeated by Kingussie 6–0 on home soil. The next in 2004 then saw the Fort go down to an unfancied Inveraray side 1–0 in Oban. When the side again reached the final in 2005 against local rivals, Kilmallie, it was seen by the wider community as case of now or never. The game, held between the two Fort William teams in the town itself, is widely regarded as the most exciting final of recent times, Fort winning with a last gasp goal to win 3–2.

Further glory was to follow the next year in 2006, when Fort William finally broke Kingussie's dominance of the league title (a World record in any sport) after a consistent level of performance throughout the year meant that Newtonmore were pipped to the title. Club captain Gordon Mackinnon one of fort williams all time consistent performers was presented with a black caman from The club for this achievement ‘Kingussie did regain a modicum of revenge by defeating the Fort comprehensively in both the MacTavish Cup (The North Senior Trophy) and the final of the Camanachd Cup in Dunoon.

== Four in a row ==
Fort again won the Camanachd Cup in 2007 by defeating Inveraray 3–1 in Inverness. The club got off to a shaky start in the 2008 season but won the Camanachd Cup yet again 2008, the first time that they had retained the trophy. The club created history by playing the first-ever top-flight fixture on a Sunday against Lochaber Camanachd on 22 June 2008. The club's reserve team also won the Strathdearn Cup in 2008 for the first time. In 2009, the club won the Camanachd Cup for a third successive year, beating Kyles Athletic 4–3 in the final at Oban. That victory added them to the select band of clubs which have won the Camanachd Cup three times in a row, the other clubs being Kingussie, Newtonmore and Kyles Athletic.

James Clark was the talisman for the three in a row years, his last-minute goals causing heartache for Kyles Athletic in particular in the 2009 final.

Through the successful three in a row years, the manager was club stalwart Drew MacNeil, who was also captain in 2005 when they defeated Kilmallie. However, in controversial circumstances, MacNeil claimed he was being forced out of the club due to conflict with the club's board. The club committee sacked MacNeil in late October along with his coach Graeme MacMillan due a "breakdown of relationships".

MacNeil was succeeded for the 2010 season by Peter MacIntyre, returning to the post which he had co-held with Davie Stafford when the team won the Premier League. MacIntyre made a strong start to the 2010 season with some good results despite his team not displaying the pomp of old, a 14–0 defeat of Glasgow Mid-Argyll aside. However, there was a massive shock in the MacTavish Cup semi-final when local rivals Kilmallie, playing in North Division One, knocked them out 4–3. Yet, the club went on to record a fourth successive Camanachd Cup win, placing them in the same company as Newtonmore and Kingussie.

== Decline and relegation ==
In 2011, Fort's run of nine successive Camanachd Cup Final appearances came to an end when they were defeated 8–1 by Newtonmore in the second round. The club finished the season without any silverware as they succumbed to Kingussie in the MacTavish Cup Final and finished well adrift in the league. This marked an end of an era for Shinty and Fort William. Gary Innes confirmed, in his BBC blog, that several older players would be stepping down at the end of the 2011 season.

2012 was a disappointing season for the Fort but this was exceeded by a woeful league performance in 2013 which saw the club relegated to the newly created National Division One for 2014. Fort's fate was sealed by a 1–1 draw against Lovat and a Kyles Athletic victory against Newtonmore. The club bounced back by gaining promotion at the first attempt in 2014 but again lost some more of the senior players that had helped bring them success in the previous year. They finished 8th in the Premier Division in 2015 and since this time the club have been rebuilding with a youth policy in the aim to get back to the top under former club legends Adam Robertson and Victor Smith who were both major parts of the club's past successes and this is starting to show in season 2021 where they are more than starting to hold their own again with the premiership teams.

Under the management of Neil Robertson and Alan Knox, 2024 saw Fort William return to the Premier Division, spearheaded by Lachie Shaw who scored 13 goals and earned a maiden Scotland call up. Incredibly, Fort William pipped Beauly to the league on the last day of the season after a win over Bute, whilst Beauly failed to win on the final match day of the season. They followed this up with a strong campaign in the top flight, finishing 4th place after having challenged for the title into the tail end of the season.

== Shinty versus football ==
Fort William and local rivals Kilmallie have succeeded in making shinty the main sport of the town, and their success is in comparison to the distinct lack of success enjoyed by local Highland League team Fort William F.C.

In 2006 the club feared they would lose their ground, An Aird, which fell within a 92-acre area of a proposed plan for a waterfront development. The local authority, Highland Council, have come under fire for their care of the park, especially after the playing surface was stripped bare by rabbits. The company behind the planned development were unequivocal in stating in April 2007 that there would be no development upon the An Aird pitch. In March 2008, Highland Council again came under fire for their negligence of the An Aird surface, which may result in the loss of An Aird's prestigious status as a Camanachd Cup Final host stadium. In February 2009 the stadium was attacked by vandals causing thousands of pounds of damage.

The club was forced to move to the Black Park in Fort William halfway through the 2011 season in order for renovation work to be done on the pitch at An Aird. The club's future at An Aird still remains shaky as in November 2010 further plans to develop the site were revealed by an Edinburgh-based company. The relocation of the Fort to a mooted first-ever all-weather pitch within Fort William may be part of this development. However, the club used Black Parks for most of 2012.

The club provides many players for the international side. Wing centre Gary Innes is a renowned accordionist.

== Season by season record ==
*2010-present only

Season	League	Tier	Teams	Position	Camanachd Cup	Macaulay Cup	MacTavish Cup
2010	Premiership	1	10	2nd	Champions	Semi-Final	Semi-Final
2011	Premiership	1	10	3rd	Round 2	Round 1	Runners-up
2012	Premiership	1	10	4th	Round 2	Semi-Final	Quarter-Final
2013	Premiership	1	10	9th	Semi-Final	Round 2	Round 1
2014	National Division	2	8	1st	n/a	Round 2	Round 1
2015	Premiership	1	10	8th	Round 3	n/a	n/a
2016	Premiership	1	10	10th	Round 2	n/a	n/a
2017	National Division	2	8	3rd	Round 2	Quarter-Final	Round 1
2018	National Division	2	10		Round 3	DNP	Round 2
