= 2017 Marine Harvest Premiership =

Marine Harvest Premiership
- Founded: 1996; 29 years ago
- Country: Scotland
- Confederation: Camanachd Association
- Number of clubs: 10
- Level on pyramid: 1
- Relegation to: National Division
- Domestic cup(s): Camanachd Cup; Macaulay Cup; MacTavish Cup; Glasgow Celtic Society Cup
- Current champions: Newtonmore Camanachd Club (2016)
- Most championships: Kingussie Camanachd (12)
- TV partners: BBC Alba; BBC Scotland
- Website: www.shinty.com

The 2017 Marine Harvest Premiership was the 21st season of the Premier Division, the highest division in Shinty. The season began on 4 March 2017 consisting of 10 teams from across Scotland. The 3rd season with Marine Harvest as title sponsors saw reigning champions Newtonmore challenging for their 8th Premiership title in a row.

The 2017 Cup competitions competed will be the Camanachd Cup, Macaulay Cup, MacTavish Cup (North District teams only) and the Glasgow Celtic Society Cup (South District teams only).

Any team winning all 4 major trophies for which they are eligible to take part in will achieve the coveted Shinty Grand Slam.

The 2017 Marine Harvest Premiership champions were Kinlochshiel Shinty Club. This was their first Premiership title.

== Teams ==
Team	Formed	Ground	Located
Glasgow Mid Argyll Shinty Club	1928	Peterson Park	Yoker, Glasgow
Glenurquhart Shinty Club	1885	Blairbeg Park	Drumnadrochit, Inverness-shire, Highland
Kilmallie Shinty Club	1929	Canal Park	Caol, Fort William, Highland
Kingussie Camanachd	1893	The Dell	Kingussie, Badenoch, Highland
Kinlochshiel Shinty Club	1958	Kirkton	Balmacara, Inverness-shire, Highland
Kyles Athletic Shinty Club	1896	The Playing Field	Tighnabruaich, Argyll and Bute
Lochaber Camanachd	1958	Spean Bridge Stadium	Spean Bridge, Lochaber, Highland
Lovat Shinty Club	1888	Balgate	Kiltarlity, Inverness-shire, Highland
Newtonmore Camanachd Club	1895	The Eilan (Eilean Bheannchair)	Newtonmore, Badenoch, Highland
Oban Camanachd	1889	Mossfield Park	Oban, Argyll and Bute

Locations of 2017 Premiership teams

== League summary ==
=== League table ===
Updated 28 July 2018
*League points adjustment

Pos	Team	Pld	W	D	L	GF	GA	+/-	Pts
1	Kinlochshiel	18	13	4	1	49	17	32	30
2	Kyles Athletic	18	13	2	3	56	28	28	28
3	Lovat	18	12	1	5	37	31	6	25
4	Newtonmore	18	10	4	4	43	20	23	24
5	Kingussie	18	9	3	6	32	27	5	27
6	Oban Camanachd	18	8	1	8	44	30	14	18*
7	Glenurquhart	18	3	4	11	28	49	-21	10
8	Lochaber	18	4	2	12	22	52	-30	10
9	Kilmallie	18	3	1	13	19	48	-29	8*
10	Glasgow Mid Argyll	18	2	2	14	21	49	-28	6

=== Form ===
Updated 28 July 2018

Team	Form
Glasgow Mid Argyll	L3
Glenurquhart	D2
Kilmallie	L3
Kingussie	L1
Kinlochshiel	W2
Kyles Athletic	W1
Lochaber	D1
Lovat	W5
Newtonmore	W1
Oban Camanachd	L3

=== Top Scorer(s) ===
Top Scorer or Scorers only
Updated 28 July 2018

Pos	Player	Team	Games	Goals
1	Keith Macrae	Kinlochshiel	12	18
