= 2017 Marine Harvest National Division =

Marine Harvest National Division
- Founded: 2014; 11 years ago
- Country: Scotland
- Confederation: Camanachd Association
- Number of clubs: 8
- Level on pyramid: 2
- Promotion to: Marine Harvest Premiership
- Relegation to: North Division One
- Domestic cup(s): Camanachd Cup; Macaulay Cup; MacTavish Cup; Glasgow Celtic Society Cup
- Broadcaster(s): BBC Alba; BBC Scotland
- Website: www.shinty.com

The 2017 Marine Harvest National Division was the 4th season of the National Division since its reinstatement in 2014. The National Division is the 2nd tier in Shinty. The season began on 4 March 2017 consisting of 8 teams from Scotland. The 2017 Cup competitions were for the Camanachd Cup, Macaulay Cup, MacTavish Cup (North District teams only) and the Glasgow Celtic Society Cup (South District teams only). Any team winning all 4 major trophies for which they are eligible to take part will achieve the coveted Shinty Grand Slam. The 2017 Marine Harvest National Division champions were Skye Camanachd who were promoted to the Marine Harvest Premiership along with Caberfeidh Camanachd Club who finished runners up.

== Teams ==
Team	Formed	Ground	Located
Beauly Shinty Club	1892	Braeview Park	Beauly, Inverness-Shire, Highland
Caberfeidh Camanachd Club	1886	Castle Leod	Strathpeffer, Ross and Cromarty, Highland
Fort William Shinty Club	1893	An Aird	Inverlochy, Fort William, Highland
Inveraray Shinty Club	1877	Winterton Park	Inveraray, Argyll and Bute
Inverness Shinty Club	1887	Bught Park	Inverness, Highland
Oban Celtic	1927	Mossfield Park / Genevan	Oban, Argyll and Bute
Skye Camanachd	1892	Pairc nan Laoch	Portree, Skye, Highland
Strathglass Shinty Club	1879	Playing Fields	Cannich, Inverness-Shire, Highland

Locations of 2017 National Division teams

== League summary ==
=== League table ===
Updated 28 July 2018

Pos	Team	Pld	W	D	L	GF	GA	+/-	Pts
1	Skye	14	12	2	0	50	9	41	26
2	Caberfeidh	14	9	2	3	47	18	29	20
3	Fort William	14	9	2	3	40	22	18	20
4	Inveraray	14	6	1	7	32	26	6	13
5	Beauly	14	5	3	6	29	41	-12	13
6	Oban Celtic	14	4	2	8	30	44	-14	10
7	Strathglass	14	2	4	8	21	35	-14	8
8	Inverness	14	0	2	12	14	68	-54	2

=== Form ===
Updated 28 July 2018

Team	Form
Beauly	D1
Caberfeidh	W1
Fort William	W1
Inveraray	L1
Inverness	L9
Oban Celtic	L1
Skye	D1
Strathglass	D1

=== Top Scorer(s) ===
Top Scorer or Scorers only
Updated 28 July 2018

Pos	Player	Team	Games	Goals
1	Kevin Bartlett	Caberfeidh	7	15
1	Craig Morrison	Caberfeidh	8	15
