= Shinty league system =

Scottish sports leagues

The Shinty league system is a series of interconnected leagues for shinty in Scotland. It is administered by the Camanachd Association.

== About the system ==
The system consists of a hierarchy of leagues, bound together by the principle of promotion and relegation. Clubs that are successful in their league can rise higher in the system, whilst those that finish at the bottom can find themselves sinking further down. In theory it is possible for any club's first team to rise to the pinnacle of shinty and become champions of the Premier Division. While this may be unlikely in practice (at the very least, not in the short run), there certainly is a significant movement within the pyramid. The number of teams promoted between leagues or divisions is usually one, although promotion and relegation sometimes do not occur due to reserve teams winning leagues or relegation resulting in an imbalanced league.

The top level is a national Premier Division. Below this, the leagues are based on geographic areas. At the lower levels the existence of divisions becomes intermittent. From 2014, the league system will revert to having two national leagues of 8 teams.

The Shinty league system does not include the University leagues or any other leagues.

== History ==
Traditional shinty was not played on a league basis, with challenge matches and cups taking precedence but over time in different areas, league shinty began to develop. The Southern League was the first of its kind, founded in 1902, and encompassed the Central Belt of Scotland. At that time, there were several clubs in Glasgow itself. In the North region, shinty was organised into the MacGillivray Leagues. This league was one step ahead of the rest of the South district which took sometime after the Second World War to develop the Dunn Leagues, which encompassed, Cowal, Lorn and Argyll.

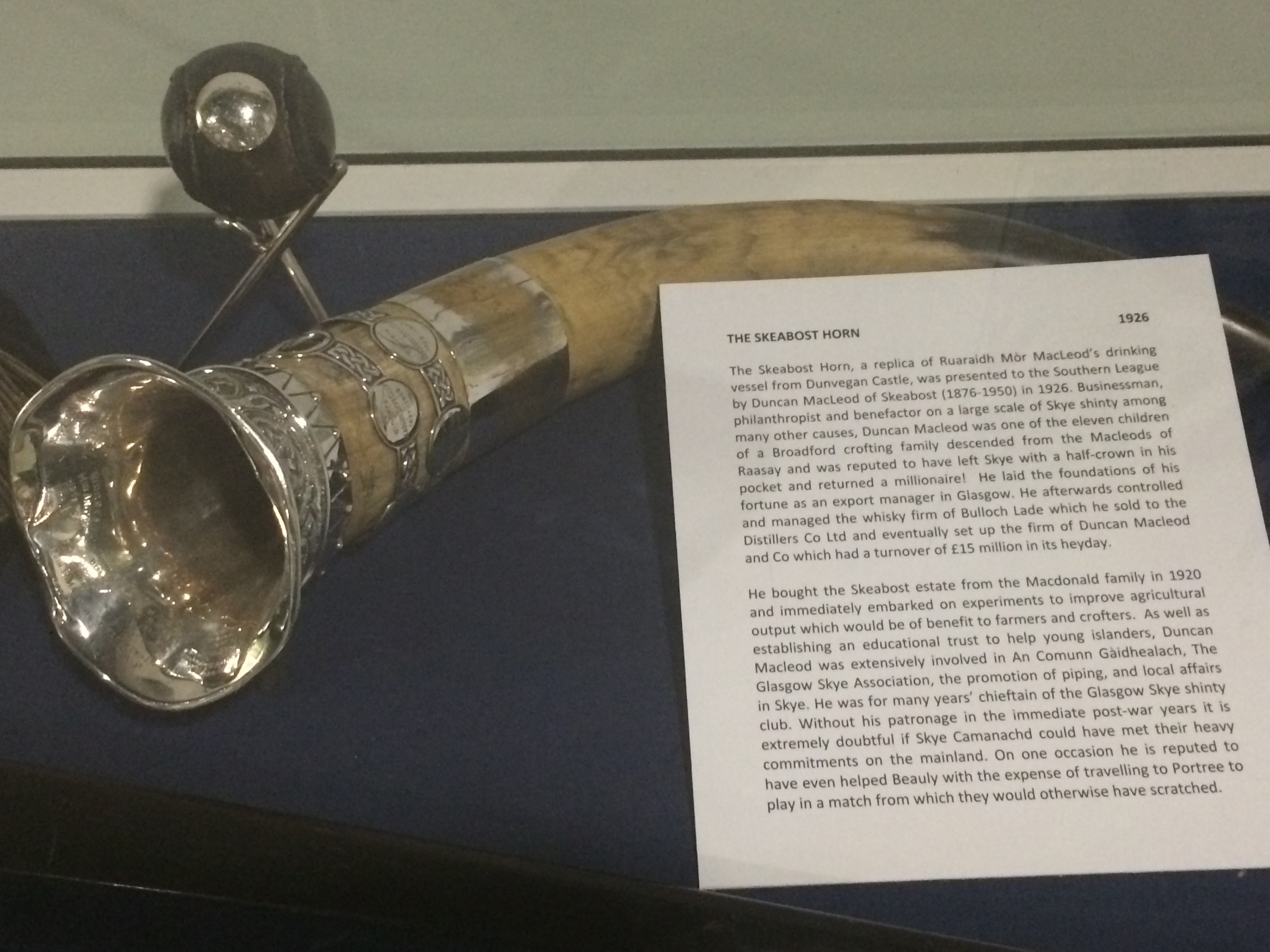
The Skeabost Horn – The trophy for competition in the old Southern Shinty Leagues in Central Belt Scotland

Eventually the Dunn and Southern Leagues amalgamated and by the early 1980s a national league playoff was established between the winners of the top tiers of the north and south leagues.

In 1996, a national Premier Division was established for the first time and then in 1999, a second national tier was established, National Division One, which was disbanded after 2006.

When the shinty playing season switched from a winter to summer season, the whole league system was replaced by an "interim" league season for the autumn and winter of 2003. The league titles available under this system are considered to be equivalent titles to other league titles, especially by Kingussie.

The Camanachd Association board of directors discussed the future of the league structure in December 2010 with a reduction of the Premier Division to 8 teams being mooted. What resulted by 2013 was a controversial return to a National Division model with a reduction in the number of teams in the Premiership to 8 from 10. This development caused a great deal of controversy and resulted in a fiery Special General Meeting which saw the Board use company law to ensure that the required 75% majority to overturn the decision was not achieved.

In 2026, proposals were put forward to re-structure the shinty leagues as some clubs faced difficulties getting games played - mainly due to travel constraints, player retention difficulties and availability of referees and other volunteers.

== The system ==
As of 2025, the league system consists of the following tiers:

- Tier One (National) – Premiership (10 teams) – bottom two teams relegated to National Division
- Tier Two (National) – National Division (8 teams) – top two teams promoted to premiership; bottom team may be relegated to relevant regional league
- Tier Three (Regional) – North Division One (9 teams) and South Division One (9 teams) – one team may be promoted to National Division; bottom team relegated to next lowest regional league
- Tier Four (Regional) – North Division Two (10 teams) & South Division Two (7 teams) – champions promoted to regional Division One

Any club can apply to the Shinty league system if they meet the Camanachd Association's registration rules.

== Problems with relegation and promotion ==
Especially since the dissolution of the second tier, National Division One, in 2006, there have been several issues regarding promotion and relegation in the system. In 2007, Oban Camanachd and Inveraray were allowed to run second teams in South Division One. In 2009, Oban's reserves, Lochside Rovers, won this league but due to Oban Camanachd first team playing in the top tier, they could not gain promotion. Despite an effort from Oban to have both teams playing in the one league, the Camanachd Association offered the opportunity for promotion to Glasgow Mid Argyll.

Glenurquhart second team won North Division Two in 2009 and 2010 but has rejected promotion on either occasion.

== Cup eligibility ==
A team's position in the system (as opposed to a club's, due to most clubs fielding two teams) affects what cup competitions that the team may play in. The eligibility rules at present are the following;

- Camanachd Cup – All teams, excluding reserve teams, in the Premier Division, National Division One, North Division One and South Division One
- Macaulay Cup – The top 8 ranked first teams from the North Area and the South Area except reserve teams
- Sutherland Cup – All teams in South Division Two, North Division Two and Three plus non-league teams. All reserve teams are eligible to play in this cup
- Balliemore Cup – All teams in North Division One & Two and South Division One, except reserve teams.
- MacTavish Cup – All North teams in Premiership, National One, North One & Two
- Glasgow Celtic Society Cup – All South teams in Premiership, National One and South One except reserve teams
- Strathdearn Cup – All North reserve teams, all teams in North Division Three plus non-league teams
- Bullough Cup – All South teams in South Division Two and reserve teams in South Division One and National One plus non-league teams

== Other shinty leagues currently in operation ==
The following shinty leagues operate outside the Shinty league system:

- The Women's Shinty League System which mirrors the men's game with a national Premier Division and Regional Lower leagues.
- The University Shinty League which runs between higher education establishments in Scotland through the close season.
- The Norcal Camanachd League has been running since 2009 in Northern California.
- The Far North Shinty League has been running since 2008 in Sutherland and Caithness.
- The various under-17, under-14 and Primary School leagues under the auspices of the Camanachd Association and other governing bodies.
- The North Carolina Shinty Association League has been running since 2010 in North Carolina.

In 2011, the Camanachd Association introduced "Development Leagues" for the North and South of Scotland. This Fifth Tier of the shinty league system did not survive the year.
