= Balliemore Cup =

The Balliemore Cup is a knock-out cup in the sport of shinty. It is the Intermediate Championship run under the auspices of the Camanachd Association and only first teams competing in the National, North Division One and South Division One are eligible for entry.

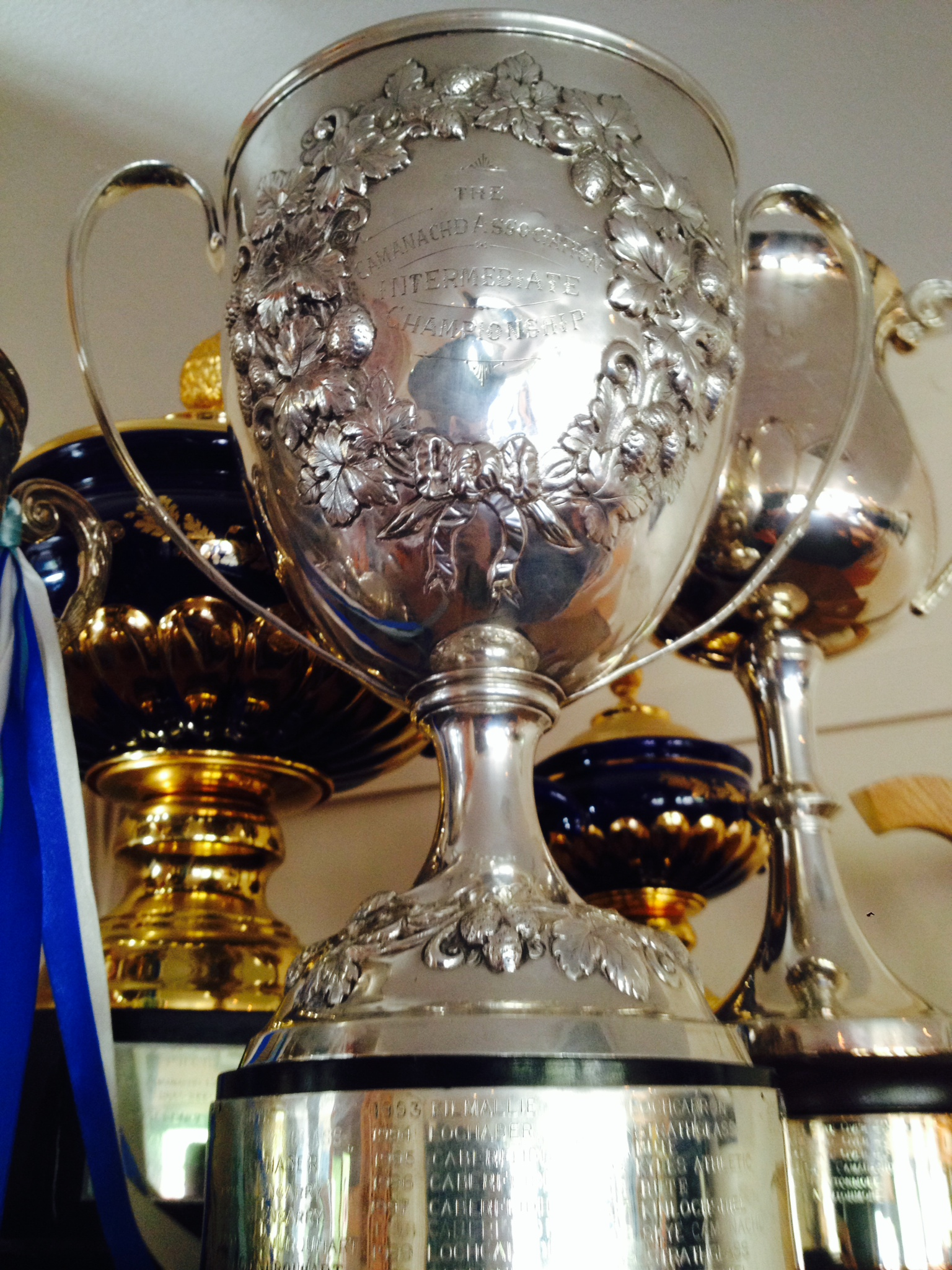
The Balliemore Cup

== History ==
In the early 20th century, Captain Colin MacRae of Balliemore ran a shinty competition in the Kyles of Bute area, and the trophy was competed for by teams such as Kyles, Bute, North Bute, Balliemore and Rhubaan Rovers. The trophy was donated for competition by his brother, Major MacRae Gilstrap.

However, after a long period without being played for the cup was presented to the Camanachd Association by Captain Duncan MacRae of Eilean Donan to be used as a trophy for national competition between teams at an intermediate level, i.e. those teams who had little chance of winning the Camanachd Cup but who were also ineligible for the Junior championship, the Sir William Sutherland Cup.

The cup was first played for as the Intermediate Championship in 1985 and was won by Bute Shinty Club 3-2 against Glengarry Shinty Club. In 2009, Bute hosted the final which was the first Balliemore final to be televised, and it was broadcast by BBC Alba. The 2010 final was notable for a match-winning save by the Kinlochshiel keeper using his head, which became a widely distributed viral hit on the internet. Since 2022 the final has been held at Spean Bridge in conjunction with title sponsors Ferguson Transport and Shipping.

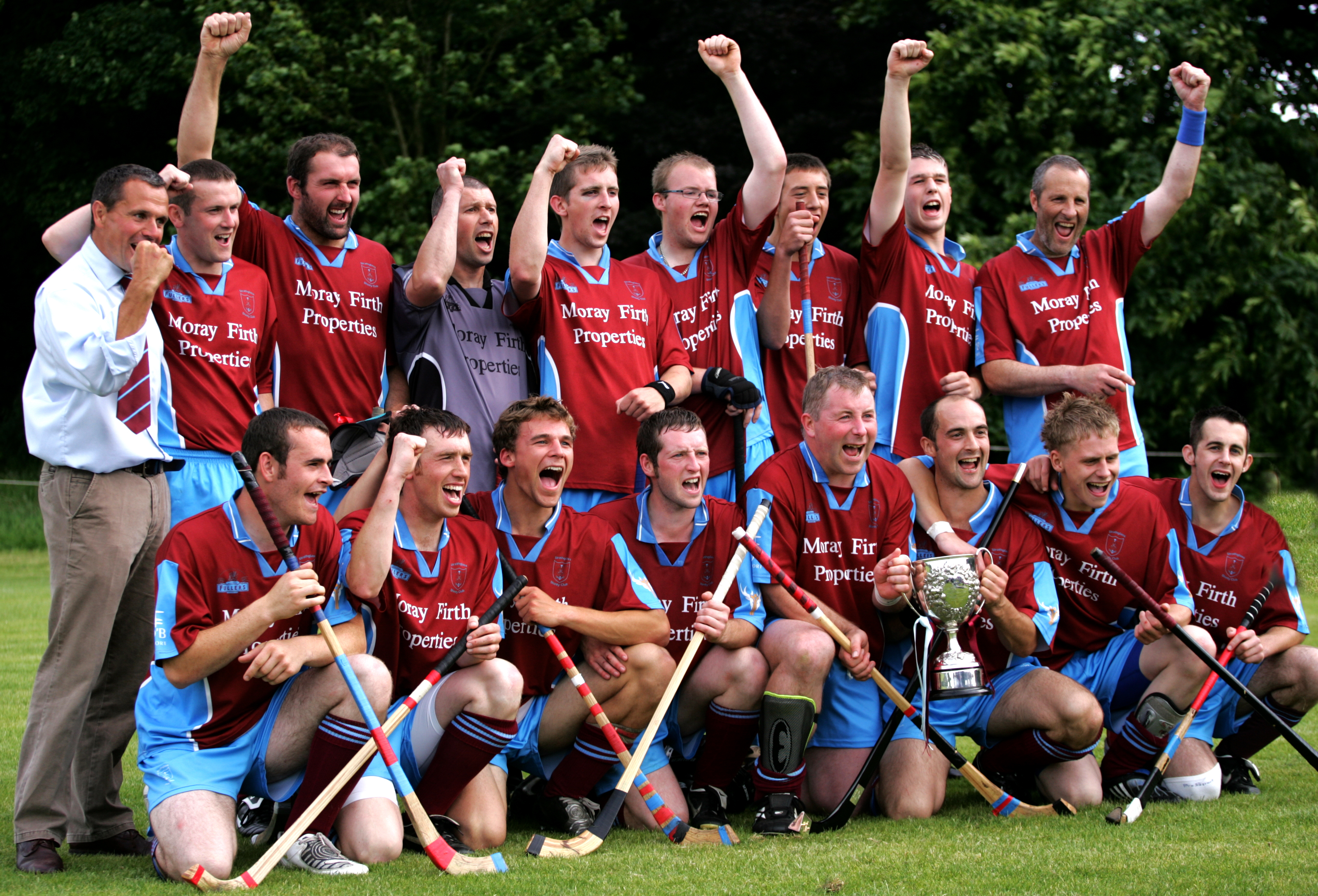
Strathglass Winners in 2009

== Previous winners ==
1985 Bute 3, Glengarry 2

1986 Strathglass 4, Col-Glen 2, (after extra time)

1987 Lochaber Camanachd 4, Bute 0, replay after 1-1 draw

1988 Glengarry 2, Bute 1

1989 Glengarry 5, Kilmory 3

1990 Glenurquhart Shinty Club 8, Col-Glen 0

1991 Glenurquhart 5, Ballachulish 0

1992 Kilmallie 5, Kilmory Camanachd 3

1993 Kilmallie 2, Inverness 1

1994 Lochaber 4, Kinlochshiel 2

1995 Caberfeidh 3, Kilmallie 1

1996 Caberfeidh 3, Kinlochshiel 2

1997 Caberfeidh 2, Kilmallie 1

1998 Caberfeidh 3, Tayforth 2

1999 Lochcarron 1, Skye Camanachd 1, (Lochcarron won 3-2 on penalties after extra time)

2000 Caberfeidh 3, Glasgow Mid-Argyll 3, (Caberfeidh won 3-2 on penalties after extra time)

2001 Inveraray 6, Ballachullish 1

2002 Lochcarron 2, Kyles Athletic 1, (after extra time)

2003 Strathglass 3, Skye Camanachd 3, (Strathglass won 3-2 on penalties after extra time)

2004 Bute 2, Lochaber 0

2005 Kyles Athletic 3, Kinlochshiel 1

2006 Bute 2, Beauly 1, in Beauly

2007 Kinlochshiel 1, Glenurquhart 0, in Newtonmore, (original final rained off in Oban)

2008 Skye Camanachd 3, Kilmalle 1, in Beauly

2009 Strathglass 5, Kinlochshiel 1, in Rothesay

2010 Kinlochshiel 3, Lochaber 3, (Kinlochshiel win 2-0 on penalties) at An Aird, Fort William

2011 Bute 2, Caberfeidh 1, at Pairc nan Laoch in Portree

2012 Lochaber 5, Beauly 1, at Castle Leod in Strathpeffer

2013 Bute 4, Beauly 2

2014 Skye Camanachd 3, Ballachulish 2, at Taynuilt

2015 Beauly 5, GMA 3

2016 Kilmallie 6, Caberfeidh 0

2017 Caberfeidh 4-4 Fort William, Fort William won 5-4 in penalties, at Drumnadrochit

2018 Kilmallie 3-2 GMA, at Fort William

2019 Fort William 3-2 GMA, at Fort William

2020 No competition due to COVID-19

2021 Skye 3-1 Beauly, at Fort William

2022 Beauly 5-1 Inveraray, at Fort William

2023 Lochaber 5-0 Kilmallie, at Spean Bridge

2024 GMA 1 Fort William 0, at Spean Bridge

2025 Lochaber 3-0 Inveraray, at Spean Bridge

=== Wins by Club ===
Club	Total	Years
Bute	5	1985, 2004, 2006, 2011, 2013
Strathglass	3	1986, 2003, 2009
Beauly	2	2015, 2022
Kyles Athletic	1	2005
Lochaber	5	1987, 1994, 2012, 2023 , 2025
Inveraray	1	2001
Caberfeidh	5	1995, 1996, 1997, 1998, 2000
Fort William	2	2017, 2019
Lochcarron	2	1999, 2002
Kilmallie	4	1992, 1993, 2016, 2018
Glenurquhart	2	1990, 1991
Skye	3	2008, 2014, 2021
Glengarry	2	1988, 1989
Kinlochshiel	2	2007, 2010
