= David Borthwick (shinty player) =

Scottish shinty player

- Born: 1962 (age 63–64)
- Occupation: Shinty Player

David Borthwick (born 1962) is a shinty player from Kingussie, Scotland. As a player for Kingussie, he is the most decorated player in the history of the sport, having won 15 Camanachd Cup winner's medals and over 100 medals in all. He retired from the sport in July 2010 after 33 years at the top-level of the sport.

He is a member of the Borthwick family which is synonymous with the Kingussie shinty team. He played alongside his brother Stephen, with whom he shares the record for Camanchd medals and 5 Borthwicks played in the 1999 final against Oban Camanachd.

He made his debut for Kingussie in October 1977 against Beauly. He holds the record number of appearances for Kingussie, has the all-time record for the number of league winners medals, holds the record number of MacTavish Cup Final appearances, broke the record for Camanachd Cup winners medals in 2002 (along with his brother Stephen and Ali Dallas), he was a winning Camanachd Cup captain in 2001, and was never on the losing side in six international appearances.

On his retirement in July 2010 after a Friday night reserve game with Fort William he was given a standing ovation. His son, Thomas, plays for Kingussie, having lifted a treble as captain in 2025, winning the Mowi Player of the Year award in the process. . Borthwick may join his brother Stephen in a management role in future.
