= Macaulay Cup =

The Macaulay Association Camanachd Cup (known as the MKM Oban Macaulay Cup for sponsorship reasons) is a trophy in the Scottish sport of shinty. It is competed for by the eight highest-placed league teams from the north and south areas of Scotland at the end of the previous season. The first winner of the cup, in 1947, was Newtonmore.

It was sponsored by investment management company Artemis from 2010 to 2025.

It is one of the five trophies that are considered to be part of the Grand Slam in the sport of shinty, with the final being broadcast live on BBC Alba.

The current holders are Oban Camanachd, who defeated Kingussie in the final of the 2026 tournament.

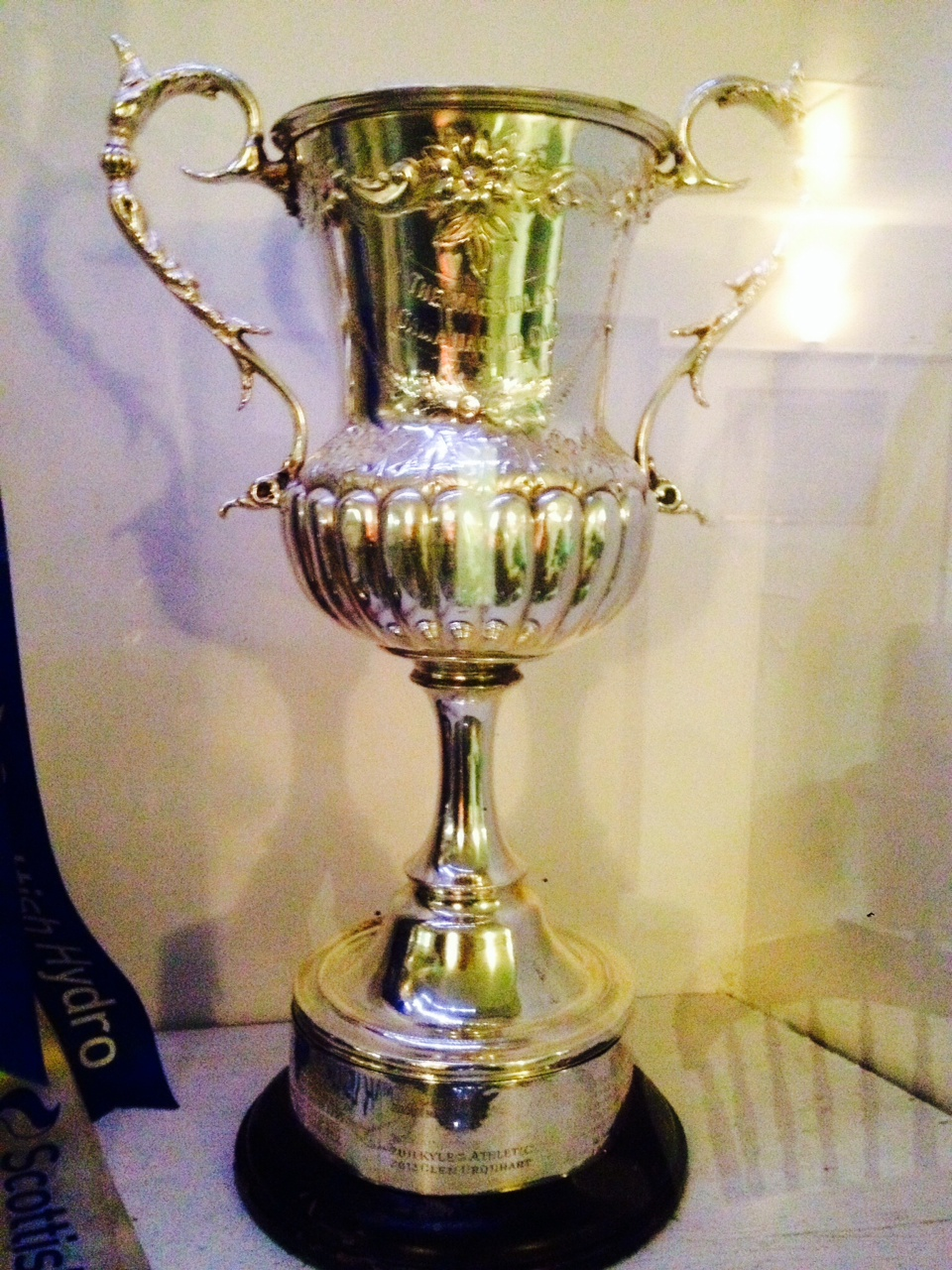
The Macaulay Cup

== History ==
The Macaulay Cup was first presented in 1947 by Flora Macaulay, then editor of The Oban Times newspaper. The competition, uniquely in the sport is run outwith the auspices of the Camanachd Association, being administered by the Macaulay Association which sometimes runs a junior six a-side competition before the final.

The final is played in Oban every year. It was the first ever summer tournament when shinty had a winter season, before the switch to summer play in 2004. In 2006, worries about the fixture list being overcrowded led to the proposal of the Macaulay Cup becoming a match between the winners of the MacTavish Cup and the Glasgow Celtic Society Cup. The Macaulay Association withdrew the cup from competition but the reintroduction of the competition in 2007 sparked debate about its place in the sport.

Inveraray won the cup 3–0 against Newtonmore on 23 August 2008. The game was televised live on BBC2. Inveraray again won the cup in 2009 coming back from 3–1 down to win the game 4–3 with a last minute goal by Grant Griffin.

Kingussie stopped Inveraray's attempt at a third consecutive title with a 4–3 win after extra time on 21 August 2010 thanks to 4 goals from Ronald Ross.

The top 8 in the south for 2012 was affected by Ballachulish's decision to drop a league, they were the eighth best team in the south (not counting Lochside Rovers who are technically a reserve team) in 2011.

The 2012 final was played between Oban and Glenurquhart. Glen defeated Oban 6–0. In the aftermath of the final, the trophy was broken during celebrations.

Kinlochshiel lifted the cup in 2016 after defeating Inveraray, their first ever national trophy, before retaining it in 2018 against Kyles. Oban Camanachd lifted the cup on home soil in 2023, their first national trophy in since 1996, which was the second of four successive finals against Kingussie.

Kingussie are the record holders with 28 wins having won the trophy in all but 1 year between 2019 and 2025, but Kyles Athletic moved into second place on the all time charts with 12 after beating Newtonmore with whom they were tied in the 2017 final.

== Winners ==
- 2026 - Oban Camanachd 2 Kingussie 1 (a.e.t.)
- 2025 - Kingussie 1 Oban Camanachd 0
- 2024 - Kingussie 4 Oban Camanachd 1
- 2023 - Oban Camanachd 2 Kingussie 1
- 2022 - Kingussie 3 Oban Camanachd 2
- 2021 - Kingussie 4 Kyles Athletic 1
- 2019 – Kingussie 3 Oban Camanachd 2
- 2018 – Kinlochshiel 3 Kyles Athletic 2
- 2017 – Kyles Athletic 7 Newtonmore 4
- 2016 – Kinlochshiel 5 Inveraray 3
- 2015 – Newtonmore 3 Inveraray 1
- 2014 – Newtonmore 2 Kyles Athletic 1 (a.e.t.)
- 2013 – Kyles Athletic 4 Newtonmore 3
- 2012 – Glenurquhart 6 Oban Camanachd 0
- 2011 – Kyles Athletic 2 Newtonmore 1
- 2010 – Kingussie 4 Inveraray 3 (a.e.t.)
- 2009 – Inveraray 4 Kingussie 3
- 2008 – Inveraray 3 Newtonmore 0
- 2007 – Kingussie 4 Inveraray 1
- 2006 – Not contested
- 2005 – Kingussie 6 Inveraray 3
- 2004 – Kingussie
- 2003 – Kingussie
- 2002 – Kingussie
- 2001 – Inveraray 3 Lochcarron 0
- 2000 – Fort William
- 1999 – Kingussie
- 1998 – Kingussie
- 1997 – Kingussie
- 1995 – Oban Camanachd
- 1994 – Kingussie
- 1993 – Oban Camanachd
- 1992 – Kingussie
- 1991 – Fort William
- 1990 – Kingussie
- 1989 – Kyles Athletic
- 1988 – Kingussie
- 1987 – Kingussie
- 1986 – Newtonmore
- 1985 – Newtonmore
- 1984 – Kingussie
- 1983 – Kingussie
- 1982 – Kingussie
- 1981 – Kingussie
- 1980 – Newtonmore
- 1979 – Newtonmore
- 1978 – Kyles Athletic
- 1977 – Kyles Athletic 2 Glen Urquhart 0
- 1976 – Newtonmore
- 1975 – Newtonmore
- 1974 – Kingussie
- 1973 – Kingussie
- 1972 – Kyles Athletic 4 Glen Urquhart 0
- 1971 – Kyles Athletic 2, Kingussie 1
- 1970 – Kingussie
- 1969 – Oban Celtic
- 1968 – Kingussie
- 1967 – Newtonmore
- 1966 – Oban Celtic
- 1965 – Kingussie
- 1964 – Oban Celtic
- 1963 – Kingussie
- 1962 – Kyles Athletic
- 1961 – Oban Celtic
- 1960 – Kyles Athletic
- 1959 – Furnace
- 1958 – Kyles Athletic
- 1957 – Oban Camanachd (8–3 most goals in a MacAulay Final)
- 1956 – Kyles Athletic
- 1955 – Inverness
- 1954 – Oban Camanachd
- 1953 – Lovat
- 1952 – Oban Camanachd
- 1951 – Kyles Athletic/Newtonmore final not played
- 1950 – Oban Celtic
- 1949 – Newtonmore
- 1948 – Lovat
- 1947 – Newtonmore 4 Ballachulish 1

=== Table of winners ===
Club	Total	Years
Fort William	2	1991, 2000
Glenurquhart	1	2012
Inveraray	3	2001, 2008, 2009
Inverness	1	1955
Furnace	1	1959
Kingussie	28	1965, 1968, 1970, 1973, 1974, 1981, 1982, 1983, 1984, 1987, 1988, 1990, 1992, 1994, 1997, 1998, 1999, 2002, 2003, 2004, 2005, 2007, 2010, 2019, 2021, 2022, 2024, 2025
Kinlochshiel	2	2016, 2018
Kyles Athletic	12	1956, 1958, 1960, 1962, 1971, 1972, 1977, 1978, 1989, 2011, 2013, 2017
Lovat	2	1948, 1953
Newtonmore	11	1947, 1949, 1967, 1975, 1976, 1979, 1980, 1985, 1986, 2014, 2015
Oban Camanachd	7	1952, 1954, 1957, 1993, 1995, 2023, 2026
Oban Celtic	5	1950, 1961, 1964, 1965, 1969
