= Camanachd Cup =

Shinty competition

- Organiser(s): The Camanachd Association
- Founded: 1896; 130 years ago
- Region: Scotland
- Current champions: Newtonmore Camanachd (35th title)
- Most championships: Newtonmore Camanachd (35 titles)
- Broadcasters: BBC Scotland; BBC Alba

The Camanachd Association Challenge Cup, usually known as the Camanachd Cup or, less commonly, the Scottish Cup, is an annual knockout competition in shinty. First contested in 1896, it is considered the premier competition in the sport. Organised by the Camanachd Association, the cup is one of the trophies considered to be part of the Grand Slam in the sport.

== History ==
The tournament was first played in 1896, with Kingussie Camanachd beating Glasgow Cowal 2–0 at Needlefield Park in Inverness.

Four teams have won the trophy three times in a row, Newtonmore, Kingussie, Kyles Athletic and Fort William.

The highest margin of victory was in 1997 when Kingussie hammered Newtonmore 12–1. The highest scoring final, and the previous largest margin of victory, was held by Newtonmore themselves, having beaten Furnace 11–3 in 1907.

Only Furnace (1923) and Newtonmore (2013) have gone through the competition without conceding a goal.

In 2006, the Cup had its first ever televised draw on BBC Scotland sports programme Spòrs, with the final also being broadcast live.

In 2019 the Camanachd Association named former Fort William and Scotland captain, Gary Innes as the competition's first ambassador.

=== Recent finals ===
Between the years of 1990 (when Skye defeated Newtonmore) and 2012 (When Kyles Athletic defeated Inveraray) there was not a final which did not feature either Kingussie or Fort William.

Kyles Athletic won the Cup in 1994, the match refereed by John Henderson of Caol. Captain David Taylor received the trophy from Peter Cullen of sponsor Glenmorangie Distillery Co. Cullen died on 7 December 2011 in Edinburgh.

Oban Camanachd won the trophy in 1996, The Centennial Final, under the management of Colin MacDonald. Ron Millican (Kiltarlity) refereed. BBC Radio Scotland provided live coverage with commentary by Iain Anderson. This was a repeat of the 1993 final.

The 2009 final was held at Mossfield Park, Oban between Kyles Athletic and holders Fort William on 19 September. An exciting final saw Fort William take a 3–0 lead before being pegged back to 3–3 by a Kyles comeback with 10 minutes to go. Fort William achieved a three-in-a-row streak, however, thanks to a late goal by Jim Clark and won the game 4–3. The match was shown live on BBC 2 and BBC Alba. Ronnie Campbell refereed.

The 2010 final was played at the Bught Park on 18 September 2010 between holders Fort William and Kingussie, who had not won the trophy since 2006. Fort William won 3–2 with a goal in the last 15 seconds from Gary Innes. Billy Wotherspoon refereed.

The 2011 final was played at the Bught yet again as An Aird was undergoing repair work. Newtonmore won the game 4–3 with an extra time goal. Derek Cameron refereed.

The 2012 final was played on 15 September at Mossfield Park, Oban. Kyles Athletic defeated Inveraray. The match was televised on BBC Two with commentary from Gary Innes.

In 2013, Newtonmore lifted the trophy for the 30th time, without conceding a goal the whole tournament.

The 2014 Camanachd Cup Final saw Kingussie win it for the 23rd time. This win also marked 100 years since the team won 6–1 against Kyles at Possil Park in Glasgow. Four-months after this final Britain declared war on Germany. By the end of 1918, six players of the winning team were dead; two had been shot and wounded and one had been badly gassed. To commemorate this, the 2014 winning team wore specially-made shirts which included a remembrance poppy and the names of the 1914 players, including those who gave their lives.

In the 2015 final Lovat's goalkeeper Stuart MacDonald was the winner of the Albert Smith Medal as his side went on to win 2–1.

The 2016 final saw Oban return to the show-piece occasion but in an uneventful game, Newtonmore reclaimed the trophy for their 31st win.

The 2017 final saw both 2015 and 2016 Camanachd Cup champions face-off with Newtonmore retaining the title against a spirited Lovat side.

In 2021 Kinlochshiel defeated Lovat 3–1 in the Final held at Mossfield Park in Oban. A hat-trick from captain Keith MacRae ensured the Camanachd Cup would reside in Wester Ross for the first time in its 125-year history.

In 2022, the final was held in Kingussie (having been scheduled for play there in 2020, but being cancelled due to the COVID-19 pandemic). It was a win for Kingussie the home-side, winning 3–1 against Lovat.

== Competition format ==
At present the tournament is competed for by teams playing in the Premier Division, National Division, and the first teams on some sides playing in North Division One and South Division One. Premiership teams join the competition at the second round stage. There was formerly a qualifying competition.

Traditionally, the trophy was competed for on a north–south basis with the best team from the northern area facing the best team from the south in the final. An open draw was introduced in 1983 which resulted in the first, and until 2012, only all-south final, between Kyles Athletic and Inveraray. The following year saw the first all-north final with two of the most successful clubs in the sport, Kingussie and Newtonmore, meeting in the final for the first time.

The final is usually played on a rotation system, with An Aird in Fort William, Bught Park in Inverness, and Mossfield Park in Oban regularly selected as venues. In recent years the final has also been held at The Dell in Kingussie, at Dunoon Stadium, and at Old Anniesland in Glasgow. The 2022 final was played at The Dell for the first time since 1999.

The 2011 final was the first ever to go to extra time; no final has ever required penalties.

The player of the match has been awarded the Albert Smith Medal since 1972.

== Trophy ==
The cup was funded by public donation in 1896 and was cast in silver by Edinburgh jewellers Hamilton & Inches. The player on the lid was modelled after Kingussie's Jock Dallas. The trophy was not completed in time for the inaugural final in April 1896, and was not presented to the winning Kingussie side until November.

In 2006, the trophy made its way to New York City for the Tartan Day celebrations, the first time it had left Scotland.

Celebrations of victorious teams have sometimes left the trophy in a fragile state, and after Skye Camanachd's 1990 win it was left unattended in a Portree square before being recovered by the local police. By 2013 the Camanachd Association had become concerned for the fragility of the cup and considered replacing it with a replica. They decided against the plan, but by 2023 has become convinced that a new trophy was required and a replica was ordered. The new trophy was made by Hamilton & Inches, the makers of the original cup. It came into service in 2024, with the original being put on display at Inverness Castle.

== Sponsorship ==
Glenmorangie and SSE plc have both sponsored the Camanachd Cup. In 2017 the cup was first sponsored by Tulloch Homes.

== Media coverage ==
The final has been broadcast on BBC Scotland since 1958, with the 1976 final shown by the BBC's United Kingdom-wide Grandstand programme. BBC Alba has also broadcast the match in with Scottish Gaelic commentary, and in recent years highlights have been made available on BBC iPlayer with live online coverage of the final.

Radio commentary on the final has been broadcast by BBC Radio Scotland since 1937. BBC Radio nan Gàidheal provides commentary in gaelic.

== List of finals ==
Apart from during the two world wars and the COVID-19 pandemic, the final has been played each year since 1896. The details of finals are shown in the list below.

Season	Winner	Score	Runners-up	Venue
1896	Kingussie	2–0	Glasgow Cowal	Inverness
1897	Beauly	5–0	Brae Lochaber	Inverness
1898	Beauly	2–1	Inveraray	Inverness
1899	Ballachulish	2–1	Kingussie	Perth
1900	Kingussie	Draw (Note: The score in the first final is unknown.)	Furnace	Inverness
1900	Kingussie	1–0 (R)	Furnace	Perth
1901	Ballachulish	2–1	Kingussie	Inverness
1902	Kingussie	3–1	Ballachulish	Inverness
1903	Kingussie	– (Note: Following a drawn match played at Perth, Inveraray refused to play a replay at Inverness. As a result the trophy was awarded to Kingussie.)	Inveraray	Perth
1904	Kyles Athletic	4–1	Laggan	Kingussie
1905	Kyles Athletic	2–1	Newtonmore	Inverness
1906	Kyles Athletic	4–2	Newtonmore	Inverness
1907	Newtonmore	7–2	Kyles Athletic	Kingussie
1908	Newtonmore	5–2	Furnace	Glasgow
1909	Newtonmore	11–3	Furnace	Glasgow
1910	Newtonmore	6–1	Furnace	Kingussie
1911	Ballachulish	2–3 (Note: Newtonmore won the first final 3–2 but a protest by Ballachulish was upheld and a replay ordered to be played.)	Newtonmore	Inverness
1911	Ballachulish	3–1 (R)	Newtonmore	Lochaber
1912	Ballachulish	4–2	Newtonmore	Perth
1913	Beauly	3–1	Kyles Athletic	Kingussie
1914	Kingussie	6–1	Kyles Athletic	Glasgow
No competition held between 1915 and 1919 due to World War I
1920	Kyles Athletic	2–1	Kingussie	Glasgow
1921	Kingussie	2–1	Kyles Athletic	Inverness
1922	Kyles Athletic	6–3	Beauly	Oban
1923	Furnace	2–0	Newtonmore	Inverness
1924	Kyles Athletic	3–3	Newtonmore	Glasgow
1924	Kyles Athletic	3–3	Newtonmore	Glasgow
1924	Kyles Athletic	2–1 (R)	Newtonmore	Kingussie
1925	Inveraray	2–0	Lovat	Inverness
1926	Inveraray	3–2	Spean Bridge	Oban
1927	Kyles Athletic	2–1	Newtonmore	Inverness
1928	Kyles Athletic	6–2	Boleskine	Glasgow
1929	Newtonmore	5–3	Kyles Athletic	Spean Bridge
1930	Inveraray	2–1	Caberfeidh	Oban
1931	Newtonmore	4–1	Inveraray	Inverness
1932	Newtonmore	1–0	Oban Camanachd	Glasgow
1933	Oban Camanachd	1–1	Newtonmore	Corpach, Fort William
1933	Oban Camanachd	3–2 (R)	Newtonmore	Keppoch, Lochabar
1934	Caberfeidh	3–0	Kyles Athletic	Inveraray
1935	Kyles Athletic	6–4	Caberfeidh	Inverness
1936	Newtonmore	0–0	Kyles Athletic	Inverness
1936	Newtonmore	1–0 (R)	Kyles Athletic	Spean Bridge
1937	Oban Celtic	2–2	Newtonmore	Inverness
1937	Oban Celtic	2–1 (R)	Newtonmore	Keppoch, Lochabar
1938	Oban Camanachd	4–2	Inverness	Oban
1939	Caberfeidh	2–1	Kyles Athletic	Inverness
No competition held between 1940 and 1946 due to World War II
1947	Newtonmore	4–0	Lochfyneside	Oban
1948	Newtonmore	4–2	Ballachulish	Inverness
1949	Oban Celtic	1–0	Newtonmore	Inverness
1950	Newtonmore	4–2	Lochfyneside	Oban
1951	Newtonmore	8–2	Oban Camanachd	Inverness
1952	Inverness	3–2	Oban Celtic	Glasgow
1953	Lovat	2–2	Kyles Athletic	Oban
1953	Lovat	4–1 (R)	Kyles Athletic	Fort William
1954	Oban Celtic	4–1	Newtonmore	Inverness
1955	Newtonmore	5–2	Kyles Athletic	Glasgow
1956	Kyles Athletic	4–1	Kilmallie	Oban
1957	Newtonmore	3–1	Kyles Athletic	Spean Bridge
1958	Newtonmore	3–1	Oban Camanachd	Inverness
1959	Newtonmore	7–3	Kyles Athletic	Glasgow
1960	Oban Celtic	4–1	Newtonmore	Oban
1961	Kingussie	2–1	Oban Celtic	Fort William
1962	Kyles Athletic	3–1	Kilmallie	Inverness
1963	Oban Celtic	3–2	Kingussie	Glasgow
1964	Kilmallie	4–1	Inveraray	Fort William
1965	Kyles Athletic	4–1	Kilmallie	Oban
1966	Kyles Athletic	3–2	Newtonmore	Inverness
1967	Newtonmore	3–0	Inveraray	Glasgow
1968	Kyles Athletic	3–3	Kingussie	Fort William
1968	Kyles Athletic	2–1 (R)	Kingussie	Oban
1969	Kyles Athletic	3–1	Kilmallie	Oban
1970	Newtonmore	7–1	Kyles Athletic	Kingussie
1971	Newtonmore	7–1	Kyles Athletic	Inverness
1972	Newtonmore	6–3	Oban Celtic	Glasgow
1973	Glasgow Mid Argyll	4–2	Kingussie	Fort William
1974	Kyles Athletic	4–1	Kingussie	Oban
1975	Newtonmore	1–0	Kyles Athletic	Kingussie
1976	Kyles Athletic	4–2	Newtonmore	Inverness
1977	Newtonmore	5–3	Kyles Athletic	Glasgow
1978	Newtonmore	3–2	Kyles Athletic	Fort William
1979	Newtonmore	4–3	Kyles Athletic	Oban
1980	Kyles Athletic	6–5	Newtonmore	Kingussie
1981	Newtonmore	4–1	Oban Camanachd	Glasgow
1982	Newtonmore	8–2	Oban Celtic	Inverness
1983	Kyles Athletic	3–2	Strachur and District	Fort William
1984	Kingussie	4–1	Newtonmore	Oban
1985	Newtonmore	4–2	Kingussie	Kingussie
1986	Newtonmore	5–1	Oban Camanachd	Glasgow
1987	Kingussie	4–3	Newtonmore	Fort William
1988	Kingussie	4–2	Glenurquhart	Inverness
1989	Kingussie	5–1	Newtonmore	Oban
1990	Skye	4–1	Newtonmore	Fort William
1991	Kingussie	3–1	Fort William	Inverness
1992	Fort William	1–0	Kingussie	Glasgow
1993	Kingussie	4–0	Oban Camanachd	Fort William
1994	Kyles Athletic	3–1	Fort William	Inverness
1995	Kingussie	3–2	Oban Camanachd	Oban
1996	Oban Camanachd	3–2	Kingussie	Inverness
1997	Kingussie	12–1	Newtonmore	Fort William
1998	Kingussie	7–3	Oban Camanachd	Oban
1999	Kingussie	3–0	Oban Camanachd	Kingussie
2000	Kingussie	3–1	Kyles Athletic	Fort William
2001	Kingussie	2–0	Oban Camanachd	Glasgow
2002	Kingussie	3–2	Inveraray	Inverness
2003	Kingussie	6–0	Fort William	Fort William
2004	Inveraray	1–0	Fort William	Oban
2005	Fort William	3–2	Kilmallie	Fort William
2006	Kingussie	4–2	Fort William	Dunoon
2007	Fort William	3–1	Inveraray	Inverness
2008	Fort William	2–1	Kingussie	Fort William
2009	Fort William	4–3	Kyles Athletic	Oban
2010	Fort William	3–2	Kingussie	Inverness
2011	Newtonmore	4–3	Kingussie	Inverness
2012	Kyles Athletic	6–5	Inveraray	Oban
2013	Newtonmore	3–0	Kyles Athletic	Fort William
2014	Kingussie	4–0	Glenurquhart	Inverness
2015	Lovat	2–1	Kyles Athletic	Oban
2016	Newtonmore	1–0	Oban Camanachd	Fort William
2017	Newtonmore	3–2	Lovat	Inverness
2018	Newtonmore	3–0	Lovat	Oban
2019	Newtonmore	Abdn (Note: The first match was abandoned due to heavy rain and an unsafe pitch)	Oban Camanachd	Fort William
2019	Newtonmore	5–1	Oban Camanachd	Fort William
2020	No competition due to the COVID-19 pandemic			
2021	Kinlochshiel	3–1	Lovat	Oban
2022	Kingussie	3–1	Lovat	Kingussie
2023	Kingussie	1–0	Oban Camanachd	Inverness
2024	Kingussie	3–2	Lovat	Fort William
2025	Newtonmore	3–2	Kingussie	Inverness
2026	Kingussie	2–1	Newtonmore	Oban

=== Results by team ===
Club	Wins	First win	Last win	Runners up	First loss	Last loss	Total finals
Ballachulish	4	1899	1912	2	1902	1948	6
Beauly	3	1897	1913	1	1922		3
Boleskine	0	–		1	1928		1
Brae Lochaber	0	–		1	1897		1
Caberfeidh	2	1934	1939	2	1930	1935	4
Fort William	6	1992	2010	5	1991	2006	11
Furnace	1	1923		4	1900	1910	5
Glasgow Cowal	0	–		1	1896		1
Glasgow Mid Argyll	1	1973		0	–		1
Glenurquhart	0	–		2	1988	2014	2
Inveraray	4	1925	2004	8	1898	2012	12
Inverness	1	1952		1	1938		2
Kilmallie	1	1964		5	1956	2005	6
Kingussie	27	1896	2026	14	1899	2025	41
Kinlochshiel	1	2021		0	–		1
Kyles Athletic	21	1904	2012	22	1907	2015	43
Laggan	0	–		1	1904		1
Lochfyneside	0	–		2	1947	1950	2
Lovat	2	1953	2015	6	1925	2024	8
Newtonmore	35	1907	2025	21	1905	2026	56
Oban Camanachd	3	1933	1996	13	1932	2023	16
Oban Celtic	5	1937	1963	4	1952	1982	9
Skye Camanachd	1	1990		0	–		1
Spean Bridge	0	–		1	1926		1
Strachur and District	0	–		1	1983		1

== See also ==
- David Borthwick, the most decorated player in the history of the shinty, having won 15 Camanachd Cup winner's medals
