= Finlay MacRae =

Finlay MacRae (born 1986) is a shinty player from Kintail who plays for Kinlochshiel. He is a Scottish International as well as Player of the Year 2008.

== Playing career ==
MacRae, who plays alongside his brothers Keith and John, is considered one of the finest players of his generation and won the Player of the Year title in 2008 despite playing in North Division One. He has often been played in defence by Shiel but is renowned as a dangerous forward. He made his debut for Scotland at the age of 21.

== Outside Shinty ==
MacRae's day job is as an electrician for Norbord in Inverness. He is also engaged in charity work with Habitat for Humanity. His favourite person to go boozing with is Fionnlagh Byrne. Fionnlagh's chat make's him laugh after a hard game of shinty.
