= Glasgow Celtic Society Cup =

The Glasgow Celtic Society Cup, known for sponsorship reasons as the Scottish Sea Farms Celtic Society Cup since 2018, is a knock-out cup competition in the sport of shinty. Entry is open to all senior teams from the South District playing in the Premier Division and South Division One. It is the oldest competition in the sport, first being played for in 1879. It is one of the five trophies considered to be part of the Grand Slam in the sport of shinty.

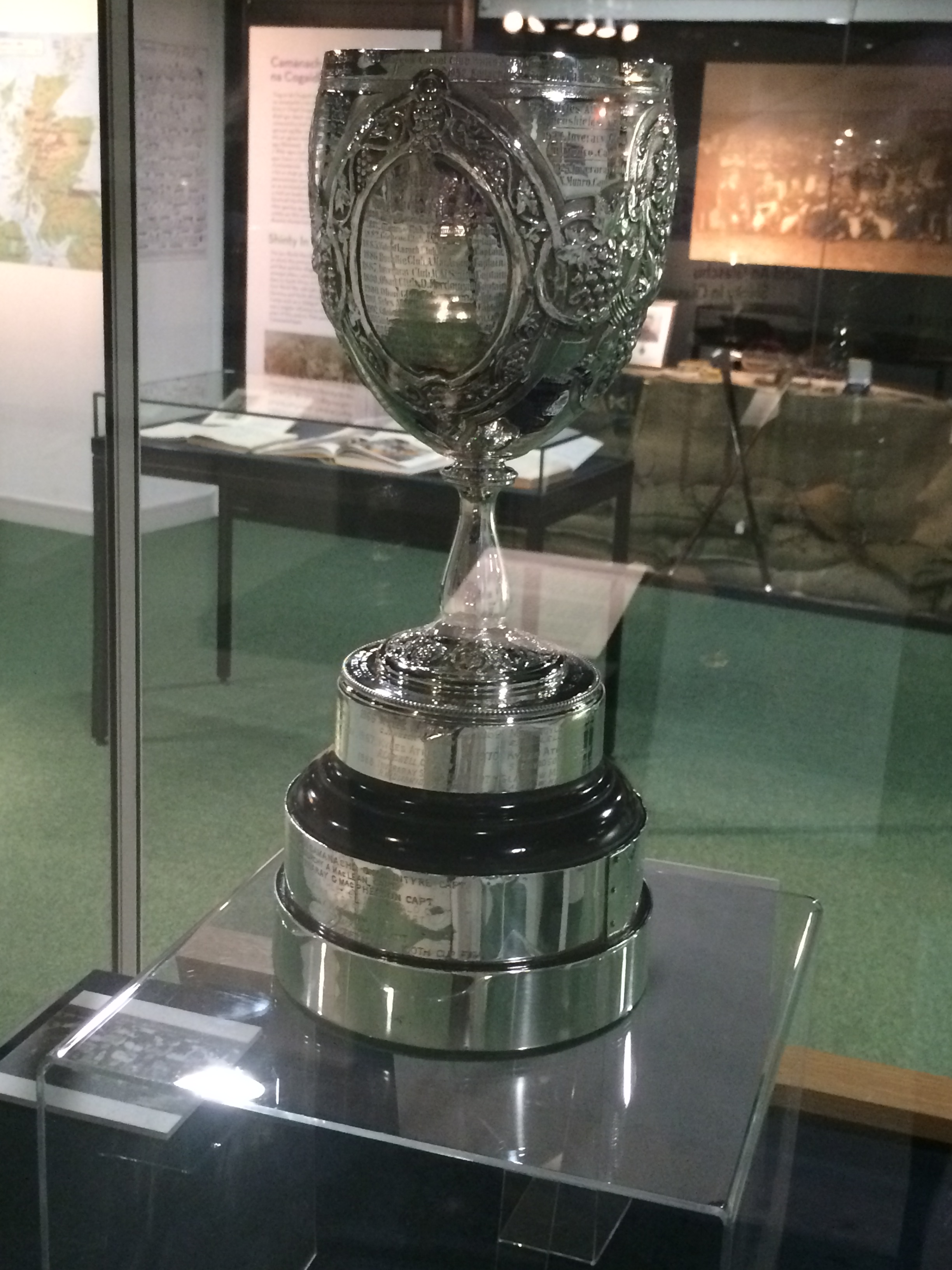
The Glasgow Celtic Society Cup - oldest trophy in Shinty

The final was always played traditionally at Old Anniesland, although both 2011 and 2012 finals were outside of Glasgow and the 2015 Cup final was held in Taynuilt between Oban Camanachd and Kyles Athletic. The final is currently played at Peterson Park, Glasgow. It is organised by the Glasgow Celtic Society in conjunction with the Camanachd Association, not by the Camanachd Association itself. The present holders are Oban Camanachd.

== History ==
The Celtic Society did not originally run the competition but presented the trophy to the Glasgow Shinty Association. Upon the demise of this organisation the Celtic Society took over the running of the competition.

In 1888, Inveraray played Furnace in the final and disputed the validity of a goal. The club took legal action and the cup was suspended for 12 years.

Teams from the North sometimes entered and Lovat won in 1950 and 1951.

Inveraray were champions in 2009, defeating Oban Camanachd 3–2. From 2004 until 2011, the competition had two unique bylaws - firstly all free-hits were direct and secondly, the penalty area was significantly larger, akin to a football penalty area, any infringement within this area culminating in a penalty hit. The restrictions regarding entry into the D and off-side remained the same as in the normal rules of shinty.

As of 2010, the opening rounds of the cup were played midweek, in order to reduce the backlog of fixtures that has regularly afflicted shinty.

In 2011, the Directors of the Glasgow Celtic Society decided to play the final at the Winterton Park, Inveraray on Saturday 25 June. Only two of the previous 106 cup finals were played outside Glasgow. This decision was based on a lack of sponsorship for the cup and the cost of hiring Old Anniesland.

The cup gained a new sponsor in 2012 with a two-year deal with AJG Parcels. The 2012 final, which was initially rained off and moved to the following Saturday, featured Inveraray, against Taynuilt in their first senior final. Unfortunately Taynuilt were thrashed 14-0 by the Royal Burgh side.

Since 2018, the cup has been sponsored by Scottish Sea Farms. A new sponsorship deal was signed in May 2022 for a further three years .

== List of Winners ==
- 2026 Oban Camanachd 8 Glasgow Mid Argyll 1
- 2025 Oban Camanachd 6 Kyles Athletic 1
- 2024 Oban Camanachd 3 Kyles Athletic 1
- 2023 Oban Camanachd 2 Glasgow Mid Argyll 0
- 2022 Glasgow Mid-Argyll 1 Kyles Athletic 0
- 2021 Kyles Athletic 1 Oban Camanachd 1, Kyles win 4–3 on penalties
- 2020 No tournament due to COVID-19
- 2019 Oban Camanachd 2 Kyles Athletic 1
- 2018 Oban Camanachd 2 Kyles Athletic 0
- 2017 Kyles Athletic 3 Oban Camanachd 1
- 2016 Kyles Athletic 3 Inveraray 1
- 2015 Kyles Athletic 4 Oban Camanachd 2
- 2014 Kyles Athletic 6 Inveraray 2
- 2013 Kyles Athletic 0 Inveraray 0 (Kyles win on penalties)
- 2012 Inveraray 14 Taynuilt 0
- 2011 Kyles Athletic 2 Oban Camanachd 1
- 2010 Inveraray 3 Kyles Athletic 2
- 2009 Inveraray 3 Oban Camanachd 2
- 2008 Inveraray 4 Glenorchy 1
- 2007 Inveraray 4 Bute 3
- 2006 Inveraray 7 Bute 2
- 2005 Oban Camanachd 7 Bute 4
- 2004 Inveraray 5 Kyles Athletic 1
- 2003 Inveraray 2 Kyles Athletic 0
- 2002 Inveraray 3 Kyles Athletic 0
- 2001 Inveraray 4 Glenorchy 1
- 2000 Kyles Athletic 3 Inveraray 1 aet
- 1999 Inveraray 3 Oban Camanachd 2
- 1998 Glenorchy 2 Inveraray 1
- 1997 Oban Camanachd 3 Kyles Athletic 2 aet
- 1996 Inveraray 4 Oban Camanachd 1
- 1995 Inveraray 2 Oban Camanachd 1
- 1994 Oban Camanachd 4 Ballachulish 0
- 1993 Oban Camanachd 5 Oban Celtic 1
- 1992 Oban Camanachd 9 Glenorchy 2
- 1991 Oban Camanachd 4 Glenorchy 0
- 1990 Oban Camanachd 3 Kyles Athletic 1
- 1989 Oban Camanachd 3 Kyles Athletic 2
- 1988 Oban Camanachd 7 Strachur 1
- 1987 Oban Camanachd 3 Glasgow Mid Argyll 1
- 1986 Kyles Athletic 4 Oban Camanachd 0
- 1985 Strachur 2 Glasgow Mid Argyll 1
- 1984 Kyles Athletic 4 Strachur 1
- 1983 Kyles Athletic 3 Strachur 2
- 1982 Strachur 2 Kyles Athletic 1
- 1981 Kyles Athletic 2 Strachur 1
- 1980 Glasgow Mid Argyll 4 Strachur 4 (GMA won 3–2 on pens)
- 1979 Kyles Athletic 3 Oban Camanachd 2
- 1978 Glasgow Mid Argyll 3 Oban Camanachd 2
- 1977 Kyles Athletic 8 Oban Camanachd 3
- 1976 Kyles Athletic 5 Bute 0
- 1975 No Competition
- 1974 Inveraray 4 Kyles Athletic 3
- 1973 Oban Camanachd 4 Glasgow Mid Argyll 3
- 1972 Glasgow Mid Argyll 3 Kyles Athletic 1
- 1971 Glasgow Mid Argyll 8 Inveraray 4 aet
- 1970 Kyles Athletic 3 Strachur 1
- 1969 Glasgow Mid Argyll 3 Kyles Athletic 1
- 1968 Inveraray 3 Glasgow Mid Argyll 2
- 1967 Kyles Athletic 3 Glasgow Mid Argyll 2
- 1966 Kyles Athletic 6 Bute 1
- 1965 Kyles Athletic 5 Glasgow Mid Argyll 0
- 1964 Glasgow Mid Argyll 4 Kyles Athletic 3
- 1963 Kyles Athletic 7 Bute 0
- 1962 Oban Celtic 8 Glasgow Uni 4
- 1961 Glasgow Mid Argyll 6 Oban Lorn 2
- 1960 Kyles Athletic 6 Glasgow Mid Argyll 5
- 1959 Glasgow Mid Argyll 3 Furnace 1 after 4–4 draw
- 1958 Furnace 3 Glasgow Mid Argyll 1
- 1957 Glasgow Mid Argyll 3 Strachur 2
- 1956 Kyles Athletic 1 Glasgow Mid Argyll 1 Kyles win 3–1 on corners
- 1955 Oban Lorn 2 Glasgow Mid Argyll 0
- 1954 Kyles Athletic 5 Glasgow Mid Argyll 0
- 1953 Lochfyneside 2 Glasgow Skye 1 aet
- 1952 Ballachulish 5 Glasgow Uni 1
- 1951 Lovat 5 Glasgow Mid Argyll 1
- 1950 Lovat 3 Lochfyneside 1
- 1949 Lochfyneside 6 Edinburgh Camanachd 1
- 1948 Oban Celtic 10 Glasgow Skye 0
- 1947 Oban Camanachd 8 Glasgow Inverness-shire 1
- 1940/46 No Competition owing to Second World War
- 1939 Kyles Athletic 1 Glasgow Mid Argyll 0 after 2–2 draw
- 1938 Oban Camanachd 5 Glasgow Skye 0
- 1937 Oban Camanachd w/o GMA withdrew
- 1936 Glasgow Mid Argyll 4 Oban Camanachd 0 after 1–1 draw
- 1935 Inveraray 1 Glasgow Mid Argyll 0
- 1934 Inveraray 8 Edinburgh Camanachd 3
- 1933 Kyles Athletic 4 Glasgow Mid Argyll 0
- 1932 Glasgow Skye 1 Kyles Athletic 0 after 1–1 draw
- 1931 Glasgow Inverness-shire 2 Kyles Athletic 1
- 1930 Glasgow Mid Argyll 4 Oban Camanachd 3
- 1929 Kyles Athletic 5 Glasgow Skye 1
- 1928 Kyles Athletic 2 Glasgow Skye 0
- 1927 Kyles Athletic 8 Glasgow Mid Argyll 0
- 1926 Inveraray 3 Glasgow Skye 0
- 1925 Inveraray 3 Glasgow Skye 0
- 1924 Inveraray 2 Glasgow Skye 0
- 1923 Kyles Athletic 4 Glasgow Skye 1
- 1922 Kyles Athletic 2 Glasgow Skye 1 aet and 1–1 draw
- 1921 Kyles Athletic 3 Glasgow Kyles 1
- 1920 Kyles Athletic 5 Glasgow Skye 1
- 1915/19 No Competition owing to Great War
- 1914 Furnace 3 Glasgow Skye 2 after 4–4 draw
- 1913 Glasgow Skye 5 Furnace 2
- 1912 Furnace 2 Glasgow Skye 1 after 4–4 draw
- 1911 Oban Camanachd 3 Glasgow Skye 2
- 1910 Kyles Athletic 4 Strachur 0
- 1909 Glasgow Cowal 1 Strachur 0 aet after 2–2 draw
- 1908 Furnace 4 Glasgow Cowal 2
- 1907 Glasgow Cowal 5 Oban Camanachd 2
- 1906 Furnace 5 Kyles Athletic 1
- 1905 Glasgow Cowal 3 Oban Camanachd 0
- 1904 Oban Camanachd 6 Kyles Athletic 0
- 1903 Kyles Athletic 2 Oban Camanachd 1
- 1902 Glasgow Caledonian 1 Kyles Athletic 0
- 1901 Kyles Athletic 3 Glasgow Caledonian 0
- 1900 Oban Camanachd 2 Kyles Athletic 1
- 1890-1899 No Competition
- 1889 Oban Camanachd 4 Glasgow Cowal 1
- 1888 Inveraray V Furnace, Furnace won but result disputed
- 1887 Inveraray 5 Glasgow Cowal 2
- 1886 Dunollie 2 Bonawe 1
- 1885 Vale of Laroch 2 Greenock 0
- 1883/4 No Competition
- 1882 Glencoe 3 Renton 0
- 1881 Glencoe 6 Renton 3
- 1880 Vale of Leven 4 Glencoe 2 aet
- 1879 Glasgow Cowal 6 Glasgow Inveraray 0

Club	Total	Years
Kyles Athletic	35	1901, 1903, 1910, 1920, 1921, 1922, 1923, 1927, 1928, 1929, 1933, 1939, 1954, 1956, 1960, 1963, 1965, 1966, 1967, 1970, 1976, 1977, 1979, 1981, 1983, 1984, 1986, 2000, 2011, 2013, 2014, 2015, 2016, 2017, 2021
Glasgow Cowal	4	1879, 1905, 1907, 1909
Ballachulish	1	1952
Vale of Leven	1	1880
Inveraray	21	1887, 1924, 1925, 1926, 1934, 1935, 1968, 1974, 1995, 1996, 1999, 2001, 2002, 2003, 2004, 2006, 2007, 2008, 2009, 2010, 2012
Oban Camanachd	24	1889, 1900, 1904, 1911, 1937, 1938, 1947, 1973, 1987, 1988, 1989, 1990, 1991, 1992, 1993, 1994, 1997, 2005, 2018, 2019, 2023, 2024, 2025, 2026
Glasgow Mid-Argyll	12	1930, 1936, 1957, 1959, 1961, 1964, 1969, 1971, 1972, 1978, 1980, 2022
Glencoe	2	1881, 1882
Dunollie	1	1886
Oban Lorn Athletic	1	1955
Glasgow Caledonian	1	1902
Furnace	5	1906, 1908, 1912, 1914, 1958
Glenorchy	1	1998
Glasgow Inverness-shire	1	1931
Lovat	2	1950, 1951
Lochfyneside	2	1949, 1953
Glasgow Skye	2	1913, 1932
Oban Celtic	2	1948, 1962
Strachur	2	1982, 1985
