= Ballachulish Camanachd Club =

Ballachulish
- Full name: Ballachulish Camanachd Club
- Gaelic name: Comann Camanachd Bhaile a' Chaolais
- Nickname: Balla or The Quarrymen
- Founded: 1893
- Ground: Jubilee Park, Ballachulish
- Manager: Morgan Smith
- League: South Division One
- 2025: 6th
Home	Away

Ballachulish Camanachd Club is a shinty team from Ballachulish, Lochaber, Scotland. The club was founded in 1893, the same year as the Camanachd Association. One of the sport's most famous clubs, they won the Camanachd Cup four times before World War I. The club is also the most northerly team playing in the South district: the kyle at Ballachulish is the traditional demarcation point between the two districts. The club moved to one team playing in South Division Two in 2013, but soon gained promotion and re-established two teams. They then gained promotion to National Division One for 2015.

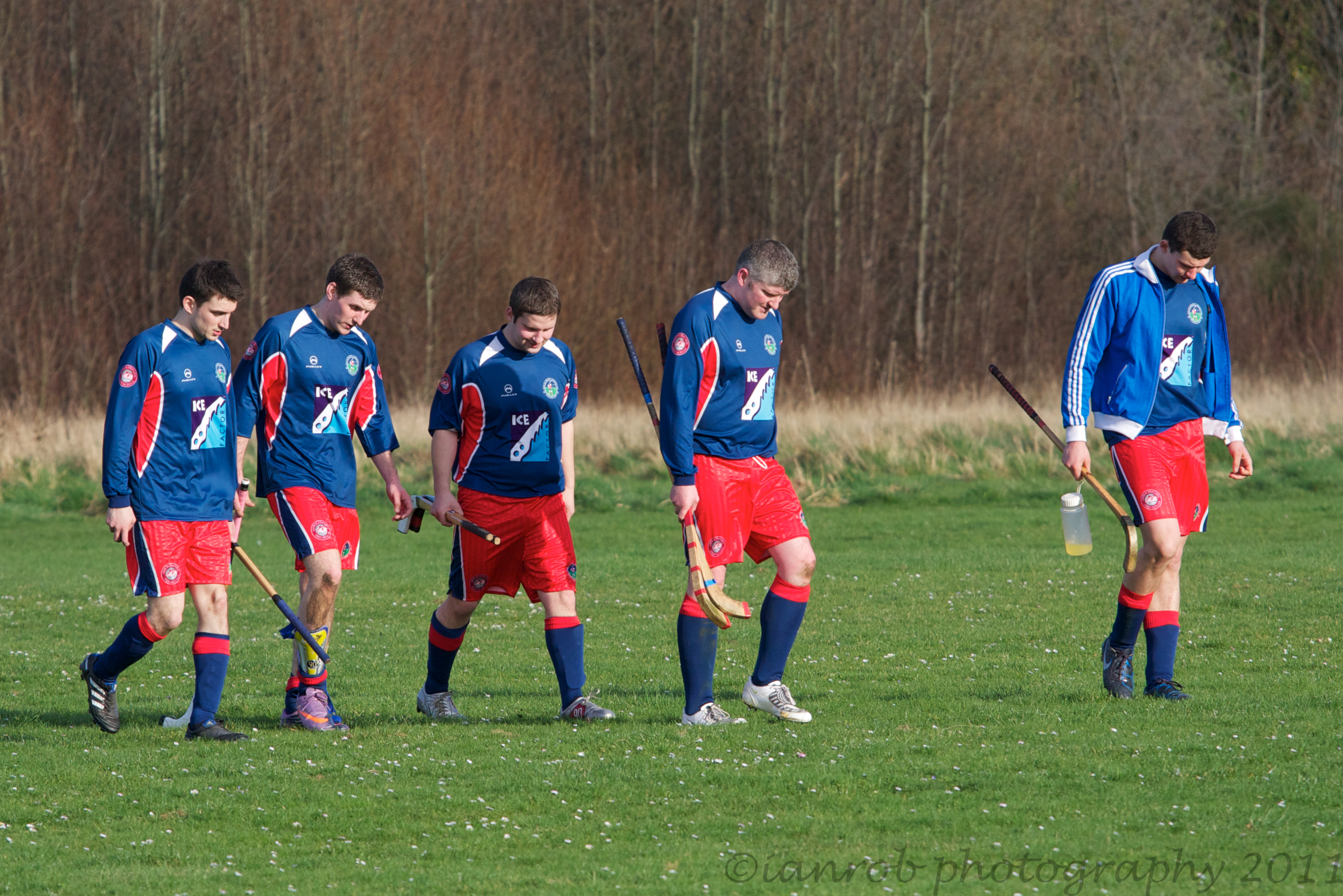
Tayforth vs Ballachulish 7343

== History ==
Founded in 1893, and built on the strength of the men who worked the Ballachulish Slate quarry, the club won the Scottish Cup in 1899, 1901, 1911 and 1912. The outbreak of war halted this run of success, and the club has never quite achieved these heights again. The club regained some modicum of strength by winning the MacTavish Cup in 1938, the only South team to ever do so, before war intervened again. Their last Camanachd Cup Final appearance to date was in 1948, when they lost to Newtonmore. Although the Ballachulish quarry is now closed, Balla's red strips continue to represent the trade union socialism in the quarry.

Although the club has never recovered the Camanachd Cup, it has several Celtic, Sutherland and Dunn Cups to its name and enjoyed a great spell in the 1960s. The club's second team restarted in 2007 and competed in the Bullough Cup and the Sutherland Cup. They did not enter competition in 2008, but competed again in 2009 in South Division Two. The second team was removed from all competition in March 2010. It re-entered in 2011.

The return of Dugald Rankin from Skye Camanachd saw an upsurge in the team's fortunes. However, Ballachulish has also exported David Campbell to Newtonmore and John MacDonald to Fort William, and often loses players to other clubs. This has seriously affected the club's ability to return to the top level of the sport.

With an imbalance in the number of clubs in the South and North Divisions One, Ballachulish were approached to enter North Division One in season 2012. However, only a month after rejecting this move, the club sensationally announced that the club would be scrapping its reserve team and also taking their first team down to South Division Two despite both sides finishing in respectable mid-table positions in 2011.

The move to the South Division Two initially saw Balla maintain a midtable position, but the return of several former players who had been playing for other teams, such as David Campbell, a Premier League winner with Newtonmore and John MacDonald, a multiple Camanachd Cup winner with Fort William and Scotland international, saw Balla win the Sutherland Cup in 2013 and gain a league playoff against Kyles Athletic. Although the league playoff was lost, Balla were still promoted. They then won the South Division One, but were defeated in the National League Playoff in 2014 by Skye. However, league reconstruction saw both teams promoted into National Division One for 2015.

== In popular culture ==
- In her article, When it's rational to hate a stranger, Scottish journalist Sylvia Patterson wrote that she hoped footballer Cristiano Ronaldo would be resurrected "as a 5ft 2in winger of a Ballachulish shinty team" in order to teach him a lesson about humility.
