= Oban Camanachd =

Shinty team based in Oban, Argyll and Bute, Scotland

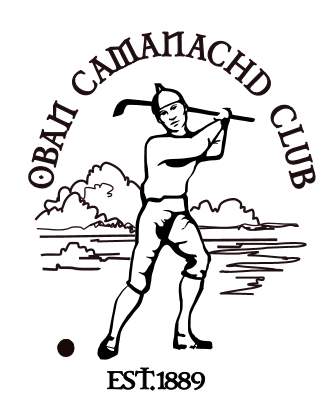
- Full name: Oban Camanachd Club
- Gaelic name: Comann Camanachd an Obain
- Nickname: The Camancheroes
- Founded: 1889
- Ground: Mossfield Park, Oban
- Manager: Daniel Cameron
- League: Premiership
- 2026: 4th
- Reserve Manager: Iain MacMillan
- League: South Division One
- 2026: 1st
Home	Away

Oban Camanachd is a shinty team based in Oban, Argyll and Bute, Scotland who currently play in the Premiership. Founded in 1889, they are one of the oldest Camanachd clubs.

The reserve team currently plays in South Division One under the name Lochside Rovers.

== History ==
Established in Oban, Argyll in 1889, the club has always enjoyed competition against its great local rival, Oban Celtic.

Past successes included winning the Camanachd Cup (Scottish Cup) in 1933. The score was Oban Camanachd 3, Newtonmore 2, at Keppoch, Lochaber, after a drawn game, 1–1, at Corpach, Fort William. They won the Cup again in 1938: Oban Camanachd 4, Inverness 2. at Oban.

The final of the Macaulay Cup is played in Oban every year. The club has won it seven times: 1952, 1954, 1957, 1993, 1995, 2023 and 2026.

The Celtic Society Cup is where Oban Camanachd have had the most success. It is the oldest competition in the sport: it was first played in 1879. It is one of the five trophies considered to be part of the Grand Slam in the sport of shinty. The club's most recent success was in 2026. The club's other successes in the competition were in 1889, 1900, 1904, 1911, 1937, 1938, 1947, 1973, 1987, 1988, 1989, 1990, 1991, 1992, 1993, 1994, 1997, 2018, 2019 and 2024, 2025.

The club is consistent with regard to having a record of success in the regional and national leagues as well as cup competitions. In the 1970s and 1980s, the team had international players like Ian "Swally" MacIntyre, Bobby Galbraith, Dougie Macintyre, Neil MacDougall, Nigel Evans, Fraser Inglis, and Chukie Clark. The team appeared in the Camanachd Cup final four times in that period and they all lost to Kyles Athletic. At Strachur, Clark got injured due to being bitten by a dog. After experiencing a dip in their performance in the competition, Clark rebuilt the second team called Lochside Rovers.

Oban Camanachd have won the Camanachd Cup on several occasions, most recently with victory over Kingussie in the 1996 final. Nonnie Macinnes was captain on the day, but the game was most notable for the performance of Gordon MacIntyre, who had made a miraculous recovery from the loss of an eye that year to score the winning goal.

=== Recent years ===
The club is proactive in trying to maintain shinty as the main sport in Oban. In 2008 the club made attempts to alter the structure of youth shinty to allow their youths to compete against 'North' teams. This was turned down at the Camanachd Association AGM, but in late October 2008 secretary Daniel MacIntyre made his fears known to the press, saying that "If we get Camanachd Association support, in the next three to five years we could potentially grow into a club with three senior teams. If we don't, in the next three to five years we will be a one-team club".

In 2009, Lochside Rovers won South Division One, defeating several first teams. Their reserve status meant that they could not be promoted to the Premier Division, where Oban Camanachd firsts play. This caused confusion regarding the ramifications for promotion and relegation to and from the Premier League. Glasgow Mid Argyll were awarded the South's place in the Premier Division.

In 2010, the club president Nigel Evans slammed Argyll and Bute Council for their "unacceptable" increases in facility hire costs. The club again started to hit the headlines in late 2010 as relegation to South Division One loomed, meaning a double relegation, as Lochside Rovers would then need to be relegated to South Division Two. Daniel Macintyre slammed the level of play in this league, painting a bleak picture for his own club.

Salvation from relegation came on the last day of the 2010 season when a 2–1 win over Bute saw the island team relegated instead.

Again in 2011, Oban were involved in the relegation battle and yet again the status of Lochside Rovers, despite another successful season which included the Bullough Cup, was uncertain due to the implications of the first team's relegation. This was confirmed on 19 November 2011 when Oban won their last game against Kilmallie but not by the required number of goals to overhaul Inveraray. Oban had been ever present in the Premier Division since its creation.

The club bounced back to the Premier at the first attempt in 2012. They also were runners-up in the Macaulay Cup. However the club's stay in the Premier League was short-lived, and their 9th-placed finish in 2013 resulted in them competing in National Division One in 2014. They again bounced back at the first opportunity and finished a much improved sixth in the Premier in 2015 alongside a Celtic Society Cup Final appearance where they lost a tight game to Kyles Athletic.

The club reached the Camanachd Cup final in 2016 and 2019, but were defeated on both occasions by Newtonmore. In 2019 they also finished 2nd in the Premiership and were runners-up in the Macaulay Cup.

Lochside Rovers won the Bullough Cup 2018, 2019 and 2026, while being runners-up in 2020. They've also had national success, winning the Sutherland Cup in 2017, 2019 and 2026.

The club won the Macaulay Cup in 2023, as well as reaching the Camanachd Cup final in the same season.

2024 saw a Glasgow Celtic Society Cup win, with Daniel MacVicar, Andrew MacDonald and Cammy Sutherland called up to represented Scotland.

Under the new management of Daniel Cameron, the club lifted their second successive Glasgow Celtic Society Cup in 2025, as well as reaching the Macaulay Cup final and challenging for the Mowi Premiership title. Daniel MacVicar was captain for these successes, being called up to the Scotland squad for another year.

The club managed to retain the Glasgow Celtic Society Cup in 2026 and win the Macaulay Cup that same year, while also getting to a Camanachd Cup semi-final against Newtonmore, eventually going to a penalty shootout. 2026 also saw the reserve team, Lochside Rovers, secure a historic treble - winning the Bullough Cup, Sutherland Cup and the Dunn Cup (South Division One title).

== Season by season record ==
Since 2010
Season	League	Tier	Position	Camanachd Cup	Macaulay Cup	Glasgow Celtic Society Cup
2010	Premiership	1	8th	Round 3	Round 1	Semi-final
2011	Premiership	1	9th (Rel)	Round 2	Semi-final	Runners-up
2012	South Division 1	2 (Note: North Division One and South Division One made up tier 2 of the shinty league system between the establishment of the Premier Division in 1995–96 and the 1997–98 season. From 1998–99 to 2006 National Division One was the tier 2 league. This division folded at the end of the 2006 season with North Division One and South Division One reclaiming their place as tier 2. The National Division was re-established ahead of the 2014 season as tier 2.)	1st (Prom)	Round 1	Runners-up	Quarter-Final
2013	Premiership	1	10th (Rel)	Round 2	Round 2	Semi-final
2014	National Division	2	2nd (Prom)	Round 1	Semi-final	Semi-final
2015	Premiership	1	6th	Round 3	n/a	n/a
2016	Premiership	1	3rd	Runners-up	n/a	n/a
2017	Premiership	1	6th	Semi-final	Semi-final	Runners-up
2018	Premiership	1	5th	Round 2	Semi-final	Winners
2019	Premiership	1	2nd	Runners-up	Runners-up	Wnners
2020	Premiership	1	Cancelled due to COVID-19			
2021	Senior League C (Note: A system of regional leagues replaced all shinty leagues during 2021 in order to reduce distances teams travelled due to the COVID-19 pandemic. Premiership clubs were placed in one of three senior leagues of six teams each.)	1	3rd	Quarter-final	Semi-final	Runners-up (Note: Kyles Athletic won on penalties after the final had finished 1–1.)
2022	Premiership	1	5th	Semi-final	Runners-up	Semi-final
2023	Premiership	1	5th	Runners-up	Winners	Winners
2024	Premiership	1	4th	Semi-final	Runners-up	Winners
2025	Premiership	1	3rd	Semi-final	Runners-up	Winners
2026	Premiership	1	4th	Semi-final	Winners	Winners
