= Kilmallie =

Civil parish in Lochaber, Scotland

Coordinates: 56.838°N 5.102°W

Kilmallie (Scottish Gaelic: Cill Mhàilidh) is a civil parish in Lochaber, in the west highlands of Scotland. It is centered on the village of Caol, near Fort William and extends to Banavie and Corpach. It gives its name to the local shinty club, Kilmallie Shinty Club as well as two local churches, Kilmallie Free Church of Scotland and Kilmallie Parish Church of Scotland.

Somerled MacMillan says that "In 1296, the English spelling of Kilmallie was Kilmalyn,.. the Anglicized form of the Gaelic Cill-Maolan (Church of the little tonsured one..) Kilmallie.. derived its name from Maolan, progenitor of the Clan MacMillan." According to WJ Watson, "A saint called Màillidh is commemorated in Cill Mhàillidh..Kilmallie .. the largest parish in Scotland. About eight miles away.. is Glen Mallie... There is also Dail Mhàillidh, Dalmally in Argyll"

The parish was once much larger than the present ecclesiastical parish. It covered the Burgh of Fort William, North Ballachulish, Banavie, Corpach and Onich, Ardgour, Blaich, Duisky, Clovulin and Garvan. The quoad sacra parish of Duncansburgh, consisting of Fort William and Inverlochy, was created in 1860

The present parish church is in Corpach. Kilgour claims that the first church was erected in the vicinity by a Columban monk in the 6th century.

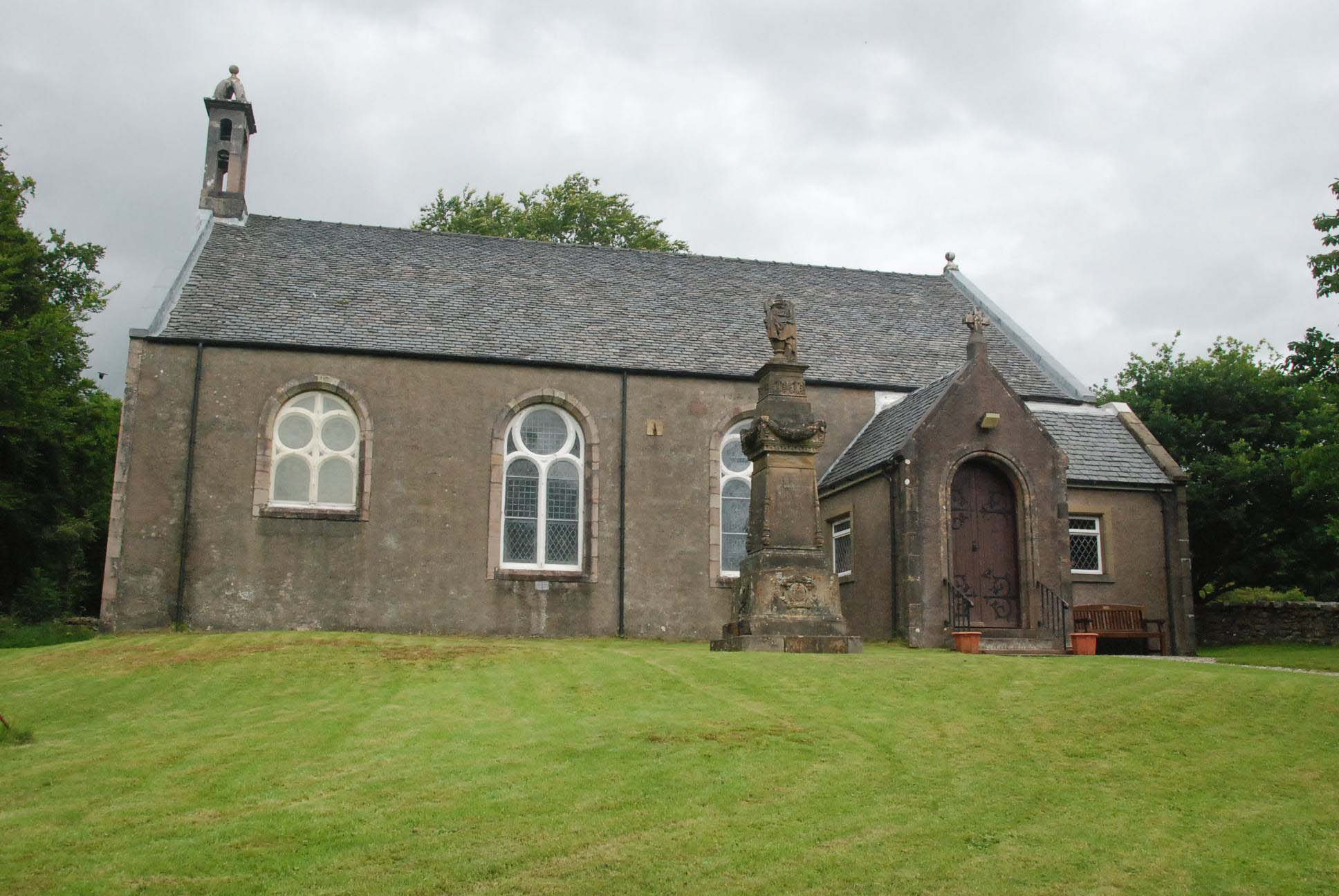
Kilmallie Parish Church

Some years after the disruption of 1843 the Free Church of Scotland were granted a site on which to build a church. It is claimed that they were deliberately given impossibly boggy ground and that the building was never stable. It was demolished in 1976 and replaced by one in the new village of Caol, where a fine new building stands today.
