= Beauly Shinty Club =

Beauly
- Full name: Beauly Shinty Club
- Gaelic name: Comann Camanachd na Manachainn
- Founded: 1892
- Ground: Braeview Park, Beauly
- Manager: Jamie 'Stork' MacLennan & Steven 'Beaver' MacKenzie
- League: National Division
- 2026: 4th
- Reserve Manager: Sandy Tulloch
- League: North Division One
- 2025: 9th
Home

Beauly Shinty Club is a shinty club from Beauly, Scotland. The club was founded in 1892. The club has two sides: the first team competed in the Premier Division in 2025; the second team competed in North Division One.

== History ==
Beauly was founded in 1892, and has won the Camanachd Cup on three occasions, in 1897, 1898 and 1913. After the 1898 triumph against Inveraray, Beauly competed against a London Camanachd side and was granted the title "Champions of the World".

In 2005, the club won North Division One but due to league reconstruction remained in this division along with sides from the disbanded National League One. In 2006, they were again denied promotion to the top-flight but this time by losing 1–0 to South Division One runners up, Kyles Athletic in a play-off. The second team won North Division Three in 2009 but were relegated in 2010.

The club has an historic rivalry with near neighbours, Lovat and this is marked every year with the annual New Year Fixture, the Lovat Cup. In 2005 the fixture attracted nationwide attention due to a Northern Constabulary crackdown on public alcohol consumption and again in 2007 by Beauly's decision to charge admission. The club once amalgamated with Lovat for a short period which is when the club won the Camanachd cup in 1913 with 5 Beauly players and 7 Lovat players.

Beauly also has a strong youth development system, and has teams competing at Under 12-, Under 14- and Under 17-levels. The Under 17-teams have been very successful in recent years winning the WJ Cameron Cup in 2008, and have hopes to retain that cup in 2009. The youngsters also reached another two finals in the last two years, but fell short in both, succumbing to a 5–1 and 2–1 defeat to Kilmallie and Fort William, respectively.

The club received funding from LEADER in November 2009 in order to redevelop Braeview Park, switching the orientation of the park and installing crowd barriers, thus allowing it to host larger finals, having successfully staged Balliemore Cup finals and Camanachd Cup semi-finals in recent years.

In the season of 2012 Conor Cormack and David Maclean were selected for Scotland at under 21 level to compete against Ireland at Ennis County Clare, both players produced excellent performances for their country with Conor being described as a Colossus in the heart of the Scotland defence.

Also in the season of 2012 Beaulys reserves were led to win both League Division 3 and the Strathdearn Cup by manager Ian Petrie who also received Division 3 manager of the year from the Camanachd Association. They were unbeaten in Division 3 until they met Boleskine Camanachd who narrowly beat them with a 3–2 victory at Farr. The reserves goal tally in Division 3 was 102 for and 21 against this was helped by ex-first team goalkeeper Martin Davidson who had opted to play outfield in season 2012 scoring some 36 goals in his first season in the forward line, and the experienced veteran Roger Cormack controlling everything around him and everything that was thrown at him during the league season. The Strathdearn Cup 2012 was won against Fort William Reserve side from North Division 2 winning 3–1 with goals from Sean Stewart (2) and Conor Ross this was a massive step for the club to achieve a cup win but also against a side in the league they have now been promoted too.

The first team finished second in North Division One in 2013 which will see them compete in the 2014 National Division One.

The club has a strong backroom staff with club president David Calder in charge. In 2015, the club renamed its pavilion as the Paterson Pavilion in tribute to two brothers, Alastair and Donald Paterson, who were part of the Camanachd Cup winning team in 1913 but were killed at the Battle of Festubert in 1915.

In 2017 former Lovat manager Alan MacRae took over the reins at the Braeview side.

2018 and 2019 were good seasons at youth level for Beauly with the U14s winning the league in each of the years and the MacMaster Cup in 2018. This led to Managers Gregor MacCormick and Niall MacLennan to be promoted to 1st Team Coaches at the start of 2021. Under their stewardship, Beauly went on to win the Balliemore Cup and finish 2nd in the MOWI National, achieving promotion to the Premiership for the first time in the club's history. In addition, the 2nd team won MOWI North Division 2 and were subsequently promoted to North Division 1. The U17s retained the MacTavish Juvenile Cup to round off a period of relative success for the Aird based side.

== Women's team ==
In 2023, the club begun girls only sessions with the overall objective of starting a women's team by 2028.
