= Kilmallie Shinty Club =

Scottish shinty team

- Full name: Kilmallie Shinty Club
- Gaelic name: Comann Camanachd Chille Mhaille
- Nickname: The Mallie
- Founded: 1929
- Ground: Canal Park, Caol
- Manager: John Morrison
- League: National Division
- 2025: 6th
- Reserve Manager: Liam Cameron, Bryan McKay
- League: North Division Two
- 2025: 2nd
Home	Away

Kilmallie Shinty Club is a shinty team from Caol, Fort William, Scotland. The club most recently achieved prominence in the all-Fort William Camanachd Cup Final in 2005.

== History ==
The club was founded in 1929 and is named after the parish of Kilmallie, within which the team plays. They were given a pitch at Corpach by James Weir of Annat Farm, where games took place until the pulp mill opened and they relocated to Canal Parks in Caol. The club has never folded or amalgamated with another club. Having won the MacGillvary Senior League in 1959 and 1960, the club won the Camanachd Cup in 1964 against Inveraray in Fort William but then fell on hard times, falling as low as North Division Four.

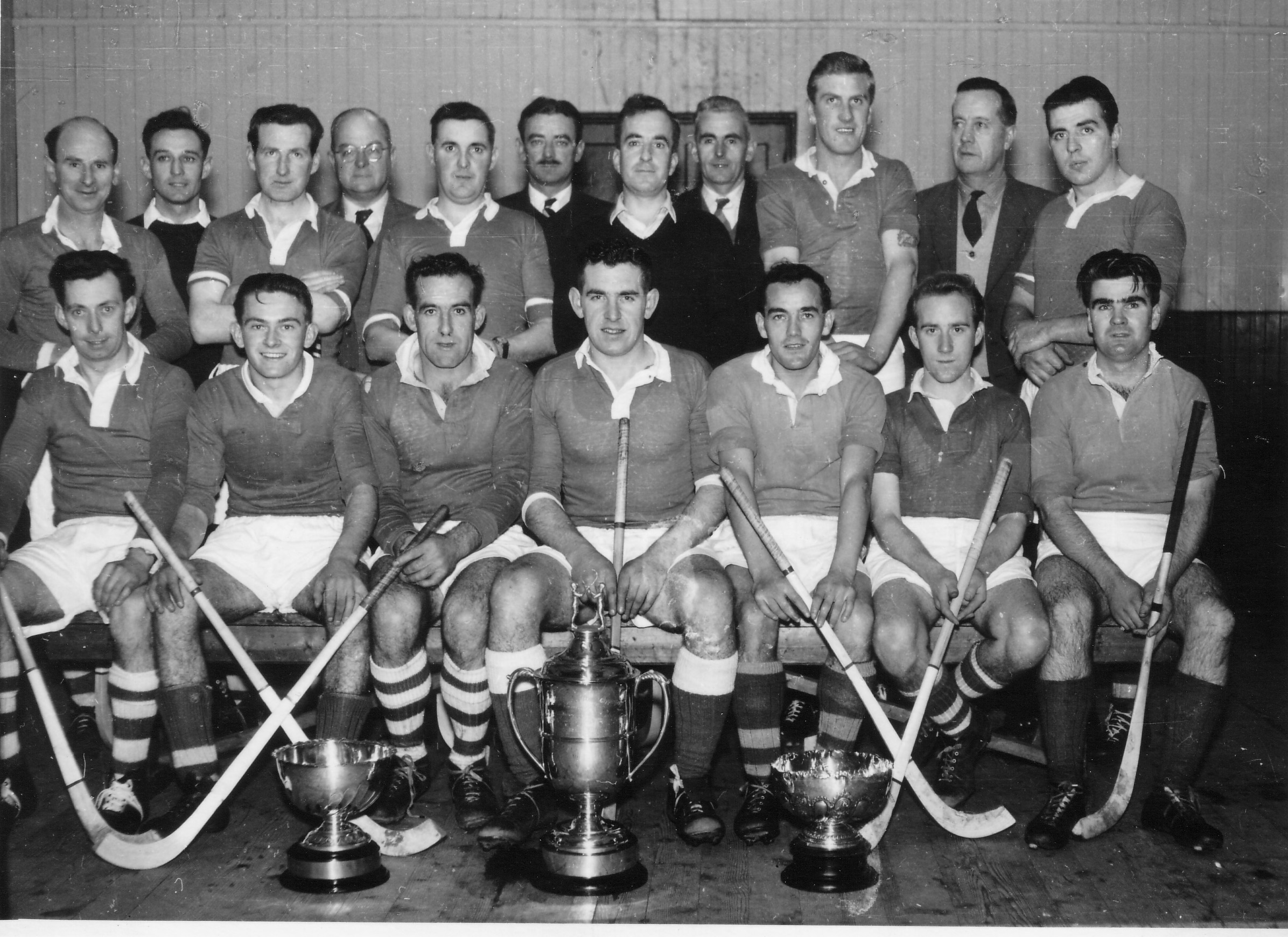
The Kilmallie team shown with trophies won that season. Back row from Left Jimmy Chisholm, David Cargill, John MacIsaac, Walter Cameron, Hugh MacIntyre, Corrie Sutherland, Alan MacDonald, Iain MacMillan, Dougie MacLaughlan, Joe MacPherson, Charlie Fraser. Front from Left. Iain MacIntosh, James Burnett, Johnny MacMaster, Derek Fraser, Ronald Ferguson, Jimmy Bruce, Donald MacIntyre

The club made progress by a concentration on youth policy and they climbed the leagues and are now a fixture in the Premier Division. The club then reached the Camanachd Cup Final in 2005 where they were defeated 3–2 by Fort William Shinty Club at An Aird, Fort William.

Whilst 2007 saw the first team's top-flight status come to an end despite a late season rally, the second team gained a revenge of sorts for the Camanachd Cup in 2005 by defeating Fort William Reserves in the Sutherland Cup Final on 17 August 2007 in Oban and also won the Strathdearn Cup the same year. The club finished second in North Division One in 2008 and 2009. The club won North Division One in 2010 and 2013. New league structuring by the Camanachd Association prevented Kilmallie being promoted in 2013 and the club being condemned to the National Division looking for promotion to the Premier League yet again. They were denied promotion again, but this time on the park, in 2015, when after a ten-week lay-off they faced Kingussie in a promotion-relegation play-off. They were defeated 2–0.

The club went on to win National Division One in strong style in 2016. The club also won the National Division in 2018 and again gained promotion to The Premier League for season 2019. There's high hopes for the current Kilmallie squad and newly appointed manager John Stewart, to compete at the highest level in shinty once again.

Kilmallie has had a number of successes over the years including the Camanachd Cup in 1964, the MacTavish Cup in 1959,1961,1967 and 1969, and the Balliemore Cup in 1992, 1993, 2016 and 2018

== Location ==
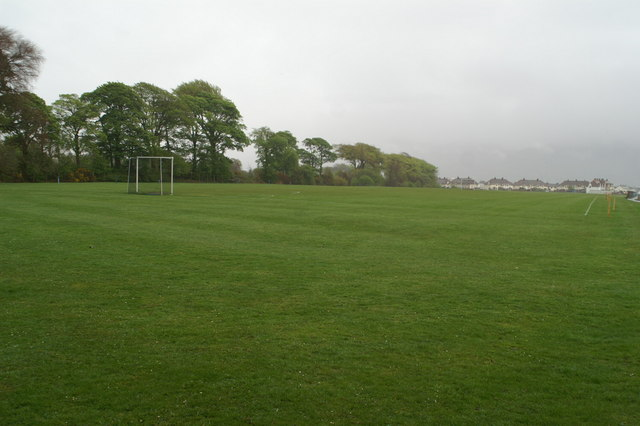
Canal Park

The pitch is on the north west side of Caol. On one side it is bounded by the Caledonian Canal and on the other side is Loch Linnhe.
