= Kinlochshiel =

Shinty club in Balmacara, Highland, Scotland

- Full name: Kinlochshiel Shinty Club
- Gaelic name: Comann Camanachd Cheann Loch Seile
- Nickname: Shiel
- Founded: 1958
- Ground: Rèaraig, Balmacara
- Manager: Wille MacRae
- League: Premiership
- 2025: 7th
- Reserve Manager: Martin MacRae
- League: North Division One
- 2025: 8th
Home	Away

Kinlochshiel Shinty Club is a shinty club based in Rèaraig, Balmacara, near Kyle of Lochalsh, Lochalsh, Scotland. The club has two men's sides, a senior team which competes in the Premiership and a reserve team in North Division One.

Kinlochshiel won their first ever senior national trophy with the 2016 MacAulay Cup. In 2017 they won their inaugural premiership, becoming only the fourth team to do so, and the second not based in Badenoch. In 2021 they completed a club grand slam by adding the Camanachd Cup and MacTavish Cup for the first time.

== History ==
The club was the result of an amalgamation of three clubs: Kintail, Lochalsh and Glenshiel, who first joined forces in 1958. These teams competed for the Conchra Cup alongside Lochcarron.

The club won its first trophies in the form of the Sutherland Cup in 1962 and the Strathdearn in 1975. Whilst the club have been successful over the years, a troublesome patch in the 1990s led to Kinlochshiel dropping down to the lowest division in the North and working their way back up the leagues and re-establishing a reserve team. This has reaped long term benefits and the club are now considered one of the best teams outside the top flight. The club boasts international players Finlay MacRae and Keith MacRae in their ranks, the surname MacRae being synonymous with the club and the local area.

In 2006, the club was joined by the wider shinty community in mourning for Johnny "Ach" Macrae, referee co-ordinator for the Camanachd Association and former North Player of the Year who died at the age of 50. His funeral was attended by over 3000 people.

== The modern era, 2006-2015 ==
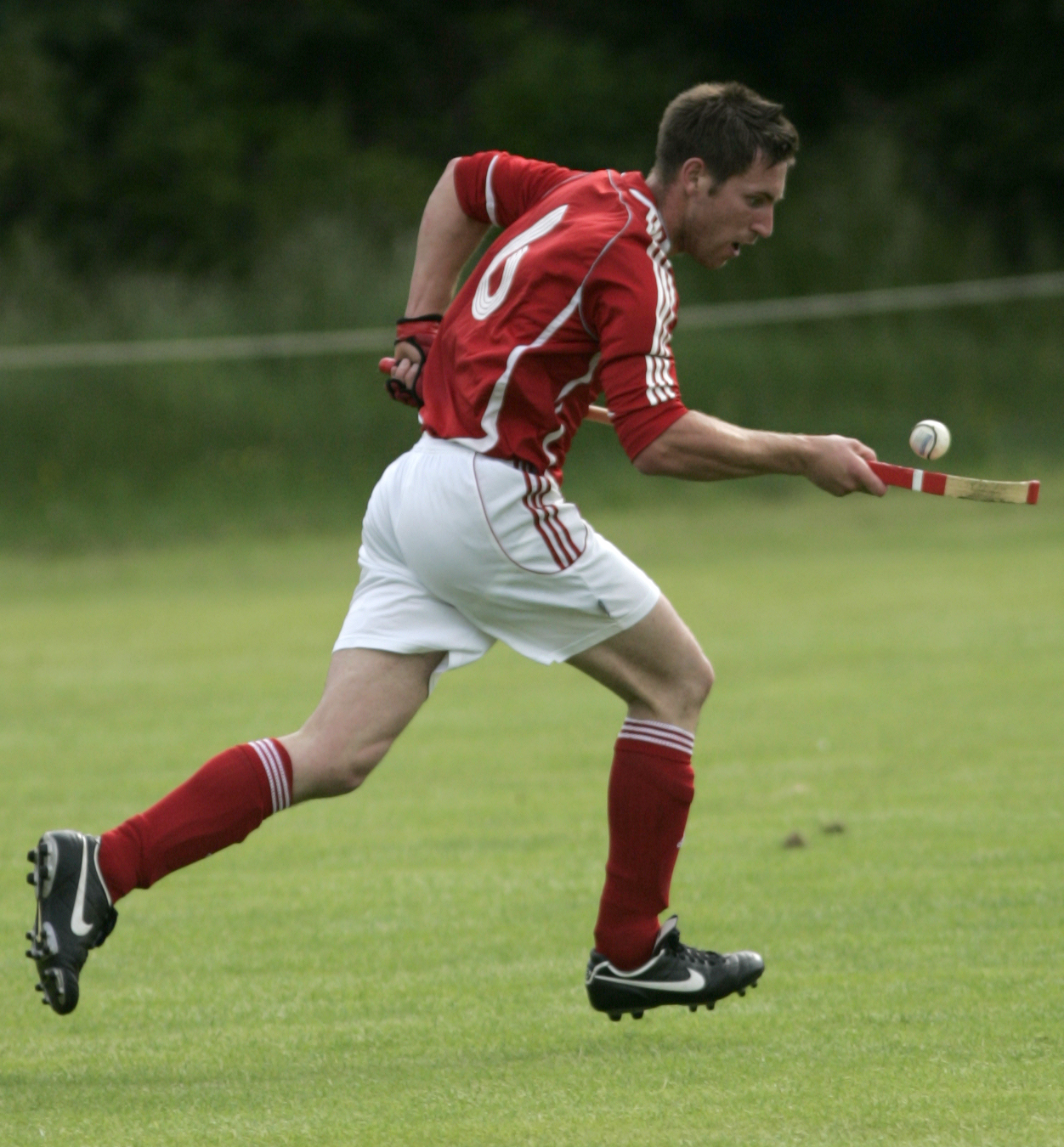
Kinlochshiel in the 2009 Balliemore Final

2007 was a very successful year for the club as they won North Division Three and the Balliemore Cup. The club won the Balliemore Cup on 1 September 2007 against Glenurquhart in a rearranged match at Newtonmore after the first game was rained out on 17 August 2007 in Oban. The first team also missed out on promotion to the Premier Division, coming second in North Division One. In 2009, the club reached the Balliemore Cup Final for the fifth time, losing 5–1 to Strathglass.

Again, the club reached the Balliemore Final in 2010. They defeated Lochaber Camanachd on penalties after a late comeback which saw them go 4–3 down in injury-time then force extra-time with the last hit of the ball. The final save in the penalty shoot out gained internet notoriety as it was accidentally saved by keeper Graham Kennedy with his head – technically a foul which should have resulted in a retake – and also an unwise decision to make regarding personal safety.

Co-manager Keith Loades stepped down in December 2010, leaving Johnston Gill in sole charge of the team for 2011. He guided the team to North Division 1 success in stunning form.

The club moved from its traditional home at Kirkton to a new field at Rèaraig, which the club purchased in 2020.

After the successful 2011 season, which saw Shiel become the only team to ever win the league with a 100% record, the 2012 season saw them reach the Camanachd Cup semi-final, which they lost to Inveraray, and consolidate strongly in the premiership with wins against Kingussie, Newtonmore and Kyles.

The club consolidated their position within the premiership after 2012, but they did not vanquish relegation worries in 2013 until the last few weeks of the season. Relegation was also a worry towards the end of the season, and it took until Lochaber Camanachd's last game to cement Shiel's position in the Premiership for the following 2015 season. As the start of the season drew closer, the first team would remain under Colin "Beaver" Fraser, whilst the second would also stay under Willie "DoonceMoth" MacRae.

Work started on the new pitch at Rèaraig, Balmacara in September 2014 to replace the notoriously boggy pitch at Kirkton. The project, which it had been hoped to be ready for playing towards the end of the 2015 season, finally opened in 2020. It was funded by sportscotland and the Highland Council, as well as generous donations from the late John Clamp and Leslie Rush. It was initially made possible by the generosity of Mrs Katherine Grant, whose late husband was president of the club for many years. The next development phase will be a multi-purpose building with changing rooms, training/meeting room, kitchen and spectator facilities.

== The Golden Generation, 2016-present ==
2016 saw the club push for the top of the premiership, aided by the signing from Beauly of Scotland international Conor Cormack. The club were too easily defeated in the Camanachd Cup semi-final in August 2016 by Newtonmore. However, under new manager Colin Fraser the club made history in September 2016 when they defeated Inveraray 5–3 in the MacAulay Cup final. This was their first senior national trophy. The game was broadcast live on BBC Two.

In 2017, the club had its most successful season ever when it secured for the first time the Premier Division title. They were pursued all season long by Kyles Athletic, but a 4–0 win at Kirkton gave Kyles the edge going towards a final day game at Oban. With Kyles' game cancelled due to wet weather, Shiel overcame Oban Camanachd 2–0 to spark scenes of celebration. Shiel were the only club outside of Badenoch, other than Fort William, to ever win the Premier title.

Kinlochshiel played Lovat in the 2021 Camanachd Cup final, their first appearance in the final of the competition. They won the cup 3-1 in Oban. A few months later they added the MacTavish Cup with an 3-2 victory over 2019 Premiership Champions Kingussie. This completed a full list of senior honours for the club, all won within five years.

Whilst the club has not tasted success since 2021, it continues to provide numerous players to the Scotland squad, with Keith and Finlay MacRae, Conor Cormack, Donald Nixon, Archie MacRae and Duncan Matheson all gaining international honours since the return of the Mowi Shinty/Hurling international in 2023.

== Kinlochshiel Ladies ==
Kinlochshiel field two ladies teams, with the 1st team winning the Mowi Challenge Cup in 2022 and 2023 before their promotion to the National Division.

== Clash of the Ash ==
The club is the only team specifically referred to in the Runrig song, Clash of the Ash, in the lines:

"Tell me who's gonna mark the Kinlochshiel Bear
He's hard as nails, quick as a flash
He comes down from the caves
For the clash of the ash"

– Clash of the Ash, C&R MacDonald, 2007
