= Caol =

Village in Scotland

Coordinates: 56.838°N 5.102°W

Caol: Scottish Gaelic: An Caol
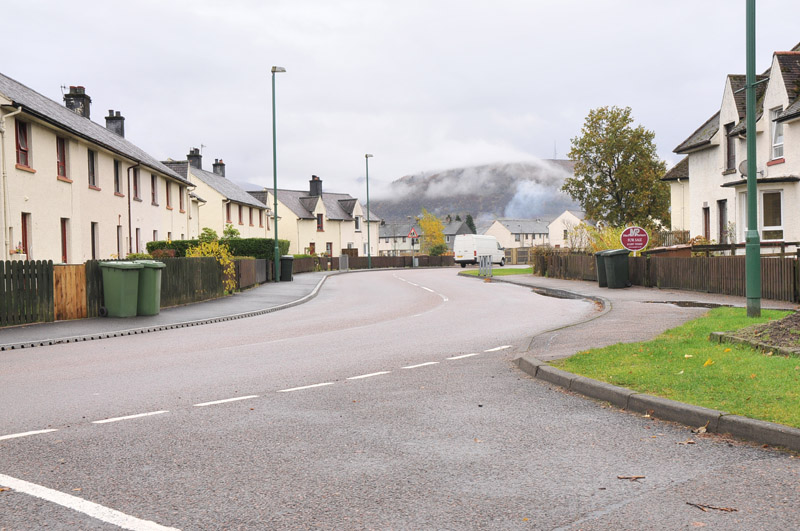
- Kilmallie Road

- Location within the Lochaber area
- Population: 3,310 (2020)
- OS grid reference: NN108762
- Council area: Highland
- Country: Scotland
- Sovereign state: United Kingdom
- Post town: FORT WILLIAM
- Postcode district: PH33
- Dialling code: 01397
- Police: Scotland
- Fire: Scottish
- Ambulance: Scottish
- UK Parliament: Ross, Skye and Lochaber
- Scottish Parliament: Skye, Lochaber and Badenoch

Caol (Gaelic: An Caol) is a village near Fort William, in the Highland council area of Scotland. It is about 1 1/4 miles (2 kilometres) north of Fort William town centre, on the shore of Loch Linnhe, and is within the parish of Kilmallie.

The name "Caol" is from the Gaelic for "narrow", in this case referring to the narrow water between Loch Linnhe and Loch Eil.

The Caledonian Canal passes by to the north-west of Caol near the rotator cuffs, and the Great Glen Way long-distance footpath passes through the village before it follows the canal towpath.

The village is largely residential, and has three primary schools, Caol Primary School; St Columba’s RC Primary School; and, for Scottish Gaelic-medium education, the Bun-sgoil Ghàidhlig Loch Abar, which has hosted the Lochaber Mòd since 2016. At Caol Primary School the Room 13 International project for art education was founded.

The local shinty team is Kilmallie Shinty Club, which plays at Canal Park in the west of Caol on the “Moominmamma” pitches.
