= Kilmory Camanachd =

Kilmory
- Full name: Kilmory Camanachd Club
- Gaelic name: Comann Camanachd Chill Mhoire
- Founded: 1977
- Ground: Macrae park, Lochgilphead
- League: South Division One
- 2025: 4th
Home	Away

Kilmory Camanachd is a shinty club from Lochgilphead, Argyll, Scotland. The club was founded in 1977 in its present form. The club plays in South Division One and has a reserve side in the Bullough cup. The club is associated with Dunadd camanachd (the ladies team)

== History ==
The original Kilmory Shinty Club was founded in 1914 and had success in the 1930s. After the Second World War, the club reformed as Kilmory United and played until 1955. The club reformed in 1977, the players being school leavers and some more experienced players who had come to live in the Mid Argyll area. This team disbanded in 1994 due to team raising difficulties. The present Kilmory Camanachd Club was re-formed in 1998 Kilmory have won the following major trophies since 1977, Division Two Fraser Cup in 1978–79, 1985–86, 1988–89, 1991–92 and 1999–00; Bullough Cup in 1979 and 1992. After the reformation of the club in 1977, the club also formed a second team which took the name Furnace, one of the most famous names in shinty.

== Furnace Shinty Club ==
Furnace won the Camanachd Cup in 1923 without conceding a goal to any team, a feat not repeated until Newtonmore in 2013. It was also an example of Furnace using early sports science to deduce that their final opponent Newtonmore's stamina was due to their backgrounds as gameskeepers and shepherds; Furnace started doing road running to build up their leg strength. Furnace joined with Inveraray as Lochfyneside and twice reached but lost in Camanachd Cup Finals - 1949 and 1953. However, Furnace had gone into abeyance many years before the resurrection of the name.

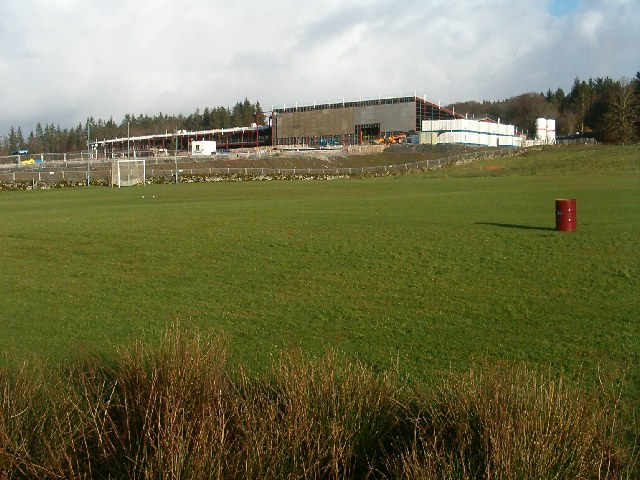
Kilmory Shinty Pitch

The use of the name Furnace ceased in the mid 1990s, the last Kilmory reserve team playing as Kilmory. The club's second team restarted in 2008 and will compete in the Bullough Cup.

== Kilmory today ==
The club won South Division One in 2004 but lost to Strathglass in a playoff for promotion to the National League. The club struggled in the 2011 season, avoiding relegation by beating Aberdour in the penultimate game of the season. This was a disappointing year after a successful 2010 that saw them reach third in the league. In 2018 the highlight of the season for Kilmory was beating their local rivals Inveraray 5-4 in a derby match at the Winterton in Inveraray. Kilmory won Division Two in 2019 but opted to remain in the division in 2022 when play resumed after Covid-19.

== Dunadd Camanachd ==
The club is associated with Dunadd Camanachd, which was one of the original teams to start playing Women's Shinty. The club was an early dominant force in women's shinty. In recent years Dunadd have been eclipsed by other teams but won South Division Two in 2018.

Dunadd
- Full name: Dunadd Camanachd Club
- Gaelic name: Comann Camanachd Dhùn Aid
- Founded: 1996
- Ground: Macrae Park, Lochgilphead
- League: South Division Two
- 2022: 2nd
Home
