= South Division One (shinty) =

Shinty league

Mowi South Division One
- Country: Scotland
- Confederation: Camanachd Association
- Number of clubs: 8
- Level on pyramid: 3
- Promotion to: National Division One
- Relegation to: South Division Two
- Current champions: Lochside Rovers (2026)
- Website: www.shinty.com

The South Division One, currently known as Mowi South Division 1 for sponsorship reasons, is the third tier of the men's shinty league system in Scotland. The league champions are awarded the Dunn Cup and may play-off against the North Division One champions for promotion to the National Division.

== Current teams ==
The 2026 South Division 1 consisted of the following teams:

*Denotes Reserve team
†Lochside Rovers are the 2nd team for Premiership side Oban Camanachd

- Aberdour Shinty Club
- Ardnamurchan Camanachd
- Ballachulish Camanachd Club
- Kyles Athletic 2nd* (withdrew from league on 19th August 2026)
- Inveraray Shinty Club 2nd
- Ballachulish Camanachd
- Glasgow Mid Argyll 2nd*
- Lochside Rovers†

== History ==
1980's: South Division One the top tier of Shinty. National final between winner of North Division One and South Division One.

1996 to 1999: Winners of North Division One and South Division One playing in National final with eventual winner gaining promotion to Premier Division.

1999 to 2006: National Division One becomes third tier of shinty with advent of National Division One. Winners of North Division One and South Division One playing in National final with eventual winner gaining promotion to National Division One (2nd tier).

2007: South Division One once again becomes the second tier of Shinty with the folding of National Division One. Champions guaranteed promotion to the Premier Division.

2014: South Division One once again becomes the third tier of Shinty with the reinstatement of National Division One with South Division One champions being promoted through a play-off win.

== List of winners since 2014 ==
- 2014 – Ballachulish Camanachd Club
- 2015 – Bute Shinty Club
- 2016 – Oban Celtic
- 2017 – Lochside Rovers
- 2018 – Bute Shinty Club
- 2019 – Aberdour Shinty Club
- 2020 – No season due to the COVID-19 pandemic
- 2021 – Regional league system (Note: A system of regional leagues replaced all Shinty leagues during 2021 in order to reduce distances teams travelled due to the COVID-19 pandemic. Premiership clubs were placed in one of three senior leagues of six teams each.)
- 2022 – Col-Glen Shinty Club
- 2023 – Bute Shinty Club
- 2024 – Lochside Rovers
- 2025 – Oban Celtic
- 2026 – Lochside Rovers
