= Oban Celtic =

- Full name: Oban Celtic Shinty Club
- Gaelic name: Comann Camanachd Ceilteach an Obain
- Nickname: Celtic
- Founded: 1927
- Ground: Mossfield Park, Oban; Ganavan, Oban
- Manager: Cameron McCallum
- League: South Division One
- 2025: 1st
Home	Away

Oban Celtic (/ˈsɛltɪk/) is a shinty team from Oban, Argyll, Scotland.

== History ==
The club was founded in 1927 due to a plethora of players being available who could not get a game for either the senior or junior side of Oban Camanachd. The Club were highly successful from the start, winning the Bullough Cup in their first year and reaching the Camanachd Cup Final in 1937, where they defeated Newtonmore.

They won the Camanachd Cup five times in all, and they have also been runners up on four other occasions. They were also South Senior Champions 12 times before reconstruction.

The Club has fallen on hard times in the new millennium, being relegated from the old National Division One to South Division One in 2004 and then being consigned to South Division Two due to a poor league position at the time of league reconstruction. This led to the best players going to fierce local rivals Oban Camanachd, with whom there were advanced talks of a merger and also the loss of the reserve team. The club finished second in South Division Two in 2007 but won the league at a canter in 2008, marking success after several years of decline.

The club were runners-up to Glenorchy in 2010 but had a disappointing 2011, finishing 7th. However, they can look forward to renewed competition with Oban Camanachd's first team in 2012 as their bitter rivals were relegated from the Premier Division.

The club holds an annual Boxing Day fixture between ex-players and the current side. There is also the Robert Wylie Memorial cup played with Inverness.

The club were forced to withdraw from the 2024 Mowi National Division due to player shortages, with the club downsizing to a single team, taking their reserves place in Mowi South Division One for 2025, also going on to win the competition. They returned to the National Division for 2026, only to drop out again before they could complete the season.

The club has gained publicity in recent years, as Robert MacIntyre plays for the club whilst not playing golf.

== Nickname and origins ==
The club is sometimes referred to simply as "Celtic".

Over the years, Oban Celtic have attracted moral support from fans of Glasgow Celtic F.C., based solely upon their name. However, this name was decided upon the mere toss of coin, the other option being Rangers. The club plays in green and white stripes.
