= National Division One (shinty) =

Shinty league

Mowi National Division
- Founded: 2014
- Country: Scotland
- Confederation: Camanachd Association
- Number of clubs: 8
- Level on pyramid: 2
- Promotion to: Premier Division
- Relegation to: North Division One or South Division One
- Current champions: Lochaber Camanachd (2025)
- Website: www.shinty.com

The National Division One, known as the Mowi National Division for sponsorship reasons, is the second tier of the men's shinty league system in Scotland.

Initially formed in 1999, the league folded in 2006 due to financial constraints before its reinstatement in 2014.

== Current teams ==
The 2025 National Division consisted of the following teams:

- Bute Shinty Club
- Col-Glen Shinty Club
- Lochaber Camanachd
- Kilmallie Shinty Club
- Glenurquhart Shinty Club
- Glasgow Mid Argyll Shinty Club
- Inveraray Shinty Club
- Strathglass Shinty Club

== History ==
1999 to 2005: Original conception of National Division One which had relegation and promotion to the Premier Division.

2006: League folded to due financial constraints

2014: National Division One reinstated

2015: Fort William and Oban Camanachd promoted to an expanded Premiership, while Bute voluntary dropped to South Division One. Inverness, who had finished bottom of North Division One in 2014 promoted in lieu with all other teams choosing to stay put for financial reasons. On the eve of the season opener, Glenorchy pulled out of the league leaving only 7 teams.

== List of winners since 2014 ==
- 2014 – Fort William Shinty Club
- 2015 – Skye Camanachd
- 2016 – Kilmallie Shinty Club
- 2017 – Skye Camanachd
- 2018 – Kilmallie Shinty Club
- 2019 – Fort William Shinty Club
- 2020 – No season due to the COVID-19 pandemic
- 2021 – Regional league system (Note: A system of regional leagues replaced all Shinty leagues during 2021 in order to reduce distances teams travelled due to the COVID-19 pandemic. Premiership clubs were placed in one of three senior leagues of six teams each.)
- 2022 – Skye Camanachd
- 2023 – Lochaber Camanachd
- 2024 – Fort William Shinty Club
- 2025 – Lochaber Camanachd
