= Kingussie Camanachd =

Scottish shinty team

Kingussie
- Full name: Kingussie Camanachd
- Gaelic name: Comann Camanachd Chinn a' Ghiuthsaich
- Nickname: The Kings
- Founded: 1890
- Ground: The Dell, Kingussie
- Manager: Ronald Ross
- League: Premiership
- 2025: 1st
- Reserve Manager: John Gibson
- League: North Division One
- 2025: 4th
Home	Away

Kingussie Camanachd is a shinty team from Kingussie, Scotland. According to the 2005 Guinness Book of Records, it is the world sport's most successful sporting team of all time, winning 20 consecutive leagues and going four years unbeaten at one stage in the early 1990s.

== History ==
The club was founded in 1893. It won the first-ever Camanachd Cup in 1896, and the club has won the cup more times than any other team, apart from Newtonmore. However, despite early success in the competition for much of the twentieth century the club struggled to win the trophy, with a victory in 1961 the club's first in forty years.

Kingussie hold a rivalry with neighbours Newtonmore, with the two teams having won the majority of Shinty's honours. Plans in 1927 would have seen the two sides merged, however these ideas were short lived, and the two sides have regularly battled out at the top level for honours since.

The senior team once held a 63-game unbeaten record, and the junior team achieved 100 games unbeaten in the early 90s. That unprecedented domination of the sport led to them becoming the world's most successful sporting team.

In 1991, the club was forced to play one season at Dunbarry, as the Dell was under repair.

Between 1996 and 2004, they only lost two games at the Dell. Both of these were against Newtonmore. Lochcarron became the first team to bring this run to an end when they beat them 7–4. This was all the more surprising as Kingussie had thrashed them 10–3 a few weeks previously.

In defeating Fort William in the 2003 Camanachd Cup final, Ronald Ross drove home the point about the club's total dominance of the sport, "Is there a team out there that can beat us? Well, I don't think so. We did not play all that well, but we destroyed them."

The club's world record of domination was finally brought to an end on 2 September 2006 when old rivals Newtonmore defeated Oban Camanachd. This meant that Kingussie could not catch the team at the top of the league.

Fort William won the league in 2006 but Kingussie gained a modicum of revenge by defeating Fort in the 2006 Camanachd Cup Final.

In 2007, they signed Fraser Inglis from Oban Camanachd, who helped Kingussie regain the league again, the club also won the MacAulay Cup in 2007 against Inveraray.

The most notable Kingussie player of recent times has been Ronald Ross, who has achieved iconic status in the game. Another notable player is Kevin Thain, the second highest scorer in the history of the sport, although his total is around half that of Ross'. The five sons of Alistair 'Alta' Borthwick were the backbone of the great 90s team.

The club are now working closely with Newtonmore to help revitalise the grassroots game in the area, whose poor state has been masked by the continued success of the Kingussie senior side.

Jimmy Gow returned as manager for the third time in 2008. Although the club lost in the Camanchd Cup Final to Fort William, they had a 100% record in the league.

The 2009 season was a tumultuous season for Kingussie. They were defeated in the finals of the MacTavish Cup and Macaulay Cup by last minute goals and were knocked out of the Camanachd Cup at the semi-final stage after a replay of a game which was abandoned with Kingussie leading 4–1 against Kyles Athletic. They also lost to Glenurquhart in the Clash of the Camans final.

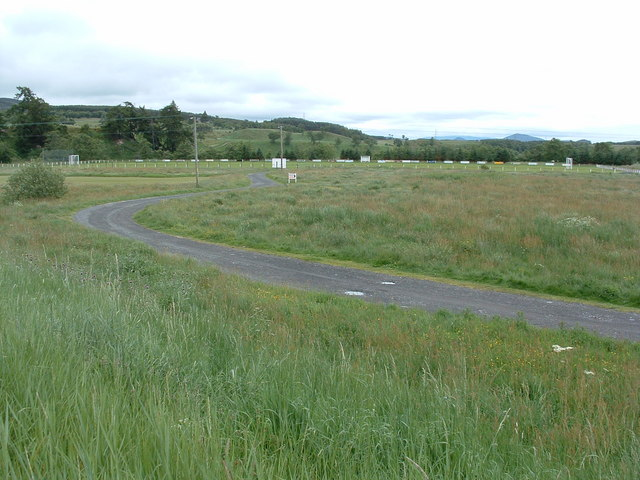
The Dell

With the league undecided, Gow announced his intention to stand down at the end of the 2009 season. Stevie Borthwick took on the role of manager in 2010.

Kingussie eventually clinched their 24th league title in 25 years on 5 December by defeating Kyles Athletic. This saw them overhaul Newtonmore on goal difference.

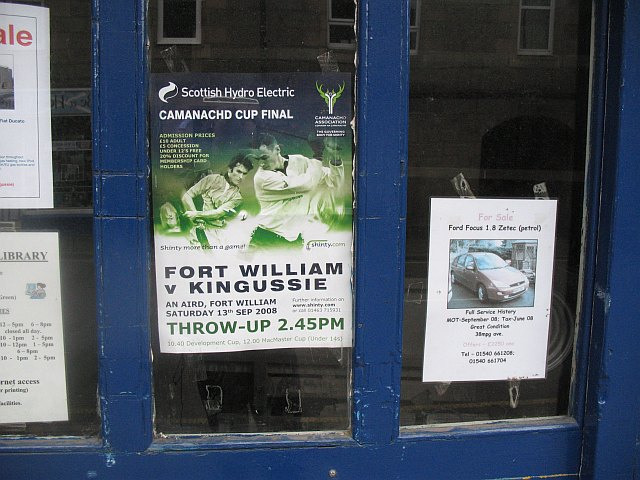
Garage window, Kingussie. Shinty is a major part of community life in Kingussie.

The start of the 2010 season saw Borthwick attempt to blood youngsters. Ronald Ross suffered a freak injury tripping on a tennis ball whilst coaching youth shinty. The team lost the first game of the season for the first time in living memory and then suffered a poor 6–0 defeat to Fort William Shinty Club. Kingussie have been written off several times before and have always come back, but 2010 promised to be the most testing season in many years for the club. The club did well after a rocky start to the season and defeated Kilmallie to win the MacTavish Cup. They were in contention for the league until a couple of games to go. The Macaulay Cup was also added to the honours for the season. With a win in the semi-final of the Camanachd Cup, Kingussie was the only team which could achieve the grand slam as of 31 August 2010. The club was sponsored by npower for 2010. However, the club lost to local rivals Newtonmore 6–0 in the league, which extinguished its league hopes (and ultimately gave its closest rivals its first league title in 25 years). They were beaten 3–2 in the Camanachd Cup final.

In 2010, the club started up a new website, which held a vote for the greatest XII in the club's history. The club also purchased the Dell from Dochfour Estate, from whom it had leased the park for 100 years previous.

Steven Borthwick was confirmed as manager for 2011 alongside Ronald Ross as captain at the club's 2010 AGM. The club had a reasonably successful 2011, winning the MacTavish Cup and reaching the Camanachd Cup Final, but in Kingussie terms, this was a disappointing return. The second team also won the Sutherland Cup. Borthwick stood down at the end of 2011. Russell Jones was appointed manager for the 2012 season.

The year 2014 saw the club lift the Camanachd Cup for the first time since 2006. Ronald Ross announced his retirement from first team duties after the victory over Glenurquhart at the Bught Park. However, in 2015 Kingussie faced a great decline, the club ending in the play-off position of ninth. They faced a relegation play-off with National Division One runners-up Kilmallie, which they won 2–0.

Dallas Young was appointed manager for 2017, integrating young talents such as Roddy Young, Ruaridh Anderson and Alexander Michie into the first team squad during a transitional period for the club. The Dell was renovated in 2018, adding a 100 seater stand, changing facilities and a scoreboard, with the venue hosting the 2018 Sutherland Cup final.

Dallas Young made way for John Gibson, who took over a Kingussie side which finished 5th in the league, only managing a 6th place finish in 2018. However, since 2019, Kingussie have been resurgent. They won the Premiership in 2019 along with the MacAulay Cup, their first national success since 2014. They retained the MacAulay Cup in 2021 whilst also winning Senior League B, a regional league played due to COVID-19 restrictions. In 2022 John Gibson's men completed a record 7th Grand Slam, winning the Camanachd, Macaulay and MacTavish Cups as well as winning the Mowi Premiership, with Roddy Young winning the Premiership Player of the Year award, with 7 goals against Kilmallie being the highlight, as Kingussie extended their winning run to 19 straight wins captained by Savio Genini. The Camanachd Cup was won in front of a home crowd, as a sold out Dell hosted the final which saw Kings defeat Lovat. Kingussie retained the Camanachd, MacTavish and Premiership yet again in 2023 under the leadership of Iain Borthwick, only conceding the Macaulay to Oban Camanachd.

2024 saw yet another Grand Slam, with Calum Grant captaining the side to an undefeated clean sweep of Shinty's 4 major trophies, with the reserves adding the Sutherland Cup and Mowi North Division 2, meaning Kingussie held 6 trophies concurrently. Three Kingussie players, namely Ruaridh Anderson, Alexander Michie and Robert Mabon received a Scotland call-up off the back of this achievement, with the later captaining the side at Cusack Park in Ennis. Thomas Borthwick was appointed club captain for the 2025 season, leading the club to a treble, as well as winning the Mowi Player of the year award. Iain "Corky" Borthwick stood down at the end of the season, with Ronald Ross taking his place as manager.
