= Newtonmore Camanachd Club =

Shinty club from Newtonmore, Badenoch, Scotland

Newtonmore
- Full name: Newtonmore Camanachd Club
- Gaelic name: Comann Camanachd Bhaile Ur an t-Sleibh
- Nickname: The 'More
- Founded: 1890
- Ground: Eilean Bheannchair, Newtonmore
- Manager: Peter Ross
- League: Premiership
- 2025: 2nd
- Reserve Manager: Glen MacKintosh
- League: North Division One
- 2025: 2nd
Home

Newtonmore Camanachd Club is a shinty club from Newtonmore, Badenoch, Scotland. As of 2025 it is historically the most successful side in the history of shinty, having won the Camanachd Cup a record 35 times, including 4 in a row from 2016-2019. They won the Premiership seven years in a row beginning in 2010.

The reserve team currently play in North Division One.

== History ==
Shinty has been played in the Newtonmore area for centuries, but more recently, there are records of shinty being played at the Eilan since 1877, and the club was formally constituted in 1893 and was a founding member of the Camanachd Association in 1895. One of their greatest early players was Dr. John Cattanach, the first shinty player in the Scottish Sports Hall of Fame.

Since then, the club has won the Camanachd Cup 35 times – a record unmatched by any other team in the game. The club's most recent victory was in 2024. A defining moment in their history was winning a pulsating match 4–3 after extra time against Kingussie in 2011. This was their first win since 1985, signalled the end of Kingussie's dominance of the sport and helped lay the ghosts of their record loss to Kingussie in 1991.

Two of the greatest names in shinty history, goalkeeper Hugh Chisholm and David "Tarzan" Ritchie jointly hold the Newtonmore club record of twelve Camanachd Cup winners medals each. The club has also won the MacTavish Cup a record forty times, together with a string of other honours. The club won the MacTavish Cup in 2009 5–4 against Kingussie at the Bught Park, Inverness on 13 June 2009. The game was broadcast live on BBC Alba. Players such as Paul MacArthur, Danny MacRae and Michael Ritchie are the sons and nephews of famous Newtonmore players and the club has a long dynastic tradition.

Many clubs throughout Scotland have long-standing rivalries with Newtonmore, including Kyles Athletic, whom they met frequently in Camanachd Cup Finals during the 1970s. Their most prominent rivalry is with nearby Kingussie. From the mid-1980s, Kingussie dominated the sport for over twenty years, during which Newtonmore won nothing. Since 2010, however, Newtonmore won the 7 straight Premier Division titles as well as several cup competitions at both first and reserve team level.

The Club field and pavilion at Eilean Bheannchair, a.k.a, The Eilan (built in 1993) are both owned by the club. In 2016 Newtonmore bought the adjacent field to the Eilan and created a new training pitch called the Dr Johnny Cattanach Memorial Field.

== 2010s revival ==
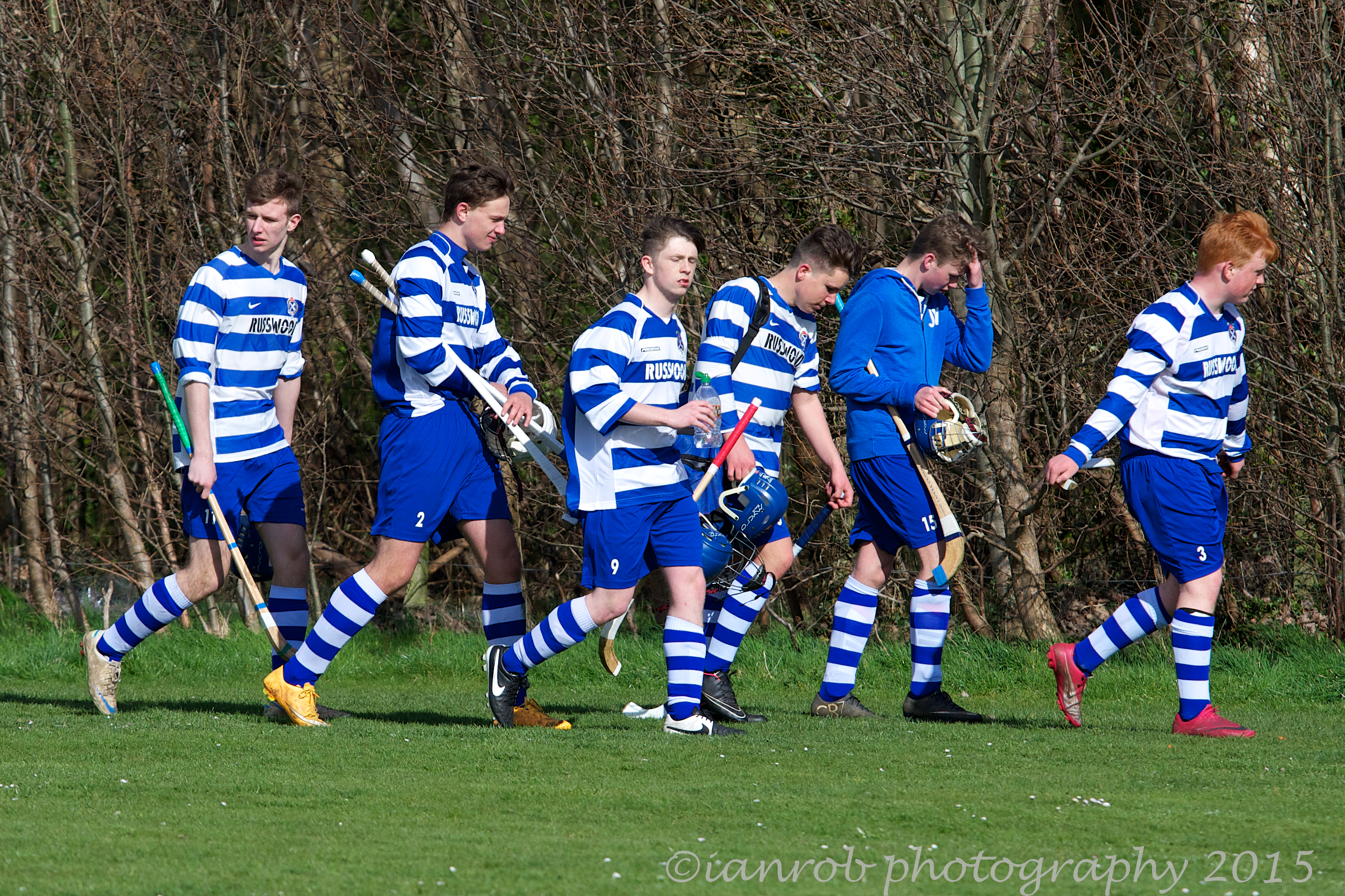
Newtonmore players in 2015

Although the club had finished second in the Premier Division in 2008, 2009 saw Newtonmore finish in the same position but edged out of the title position by Kingussie in their final match. The next few seasons promised a lot for 'More with a young squad doing well over the last few years. 2010 saw them go into the last game of the season against Fort William with the chance of winning the league by only needing to avoid defeat. In the end, 'More won the league outright with a goal from Danny MacRae with 10 minutes to go. This was Newtonmore's first league title in 25 years.

In 2011, Newtonmore overcame Inveraray 5–2 after extra-time to book their first Camanachd Cup final appearance since their humiliation in 1997 by Kingussie, going on to win the final at the Bught Park in Inverness 4–3 against Kingussie.

The first team also retained the Premier Division in 2011 with a last minute goal from Danny MacRae in the final match of the season in a winner takes all match against Kyles Athletic. This sealed a season with both teams at the club winning their respective leagues and also a cup, the second team winning the Strathdearn Cup. it was Newtonmore's first double since 1985.

2012 saw Newtonmore relinquish the Camanachd Cup after defeat to Kyles in the semi-final. Their second team again romped away with the North Division Two, but were stripped of the Sutherland Cup, which they had won 5–4 against Kingussie. This was due to playing an ineligible player in both the semi and final. The first team also won their third Premier Division in a row in 2012.

The Premiership title was clinched in 2013 with relative ease, but hopes of a Grand Slam were dashed by a MacTavish semi-final defeat to Glenurquhart and a disastrous MacAulay Cup final defeat to Kyles Athletic. Newtonmore did clinch the double with revenge over Kyles in the Camanachd Cup final, their second title in three years. This victory was notable as Newtonmore were only the second team, and the first since Furnace in 1929 to go through the competition without conceding a goal. Newtonmore went on to lift the league title for 7 years in a row, as well as the Camanachd Cup every year between 2016-19. The 2019 final is notable for being the only Camanachd Cup final to have ever been called off, with torrential rain forcing the match to be replayed the following week, where a 5-1 win secured four in a row.

After the pandemic Newtonmore fell away from their dominance of the previous decade, failing to reach a cup final and faltering in the league. The appointment of successful 2nd team manager Peter Ross hailed a change in fortunes, finishing as runner up in the Mowi Premiership and regaining the Camanachd Cup, edging out arch rivals Kingussie in a 3-2 win in the final held at Bught Park, with captain Craig Ritchie lifting the cup. Iain Robinson was awarded the Albert Smith Medal, whilst 16 year old Joe Coyle also scored in the final. Interestingly, the youngster also turns out for Ross County, having scored 2 goals in the League Cup in the weeks leading up to the final. The same year saw the under 17 side lift the London Shield and MacTavish Juvenile final, having scored 126 goals and conceding just 3 over the season.
