= North Division One (shinty) =

Shinty league

Mowi North Division One
- Country: Scotland
- Confederation: Camanachd Association
- Number of clubs: 9
- Level on pyramid: 3
- Promotion to: National Division
- Relegation to: North Division Two
- Current champions: Fort William Shinty Club (2025)
- Website: www.shinty.com

The North Division One, currently known as the Mowi North Division 1 for sponsorship reasons, is the third tier of the men's shinty league system in Scotland. The league champions are awarded the MacGillivary Cup and may play-off against the South Division One champions for promotion to the National Division.

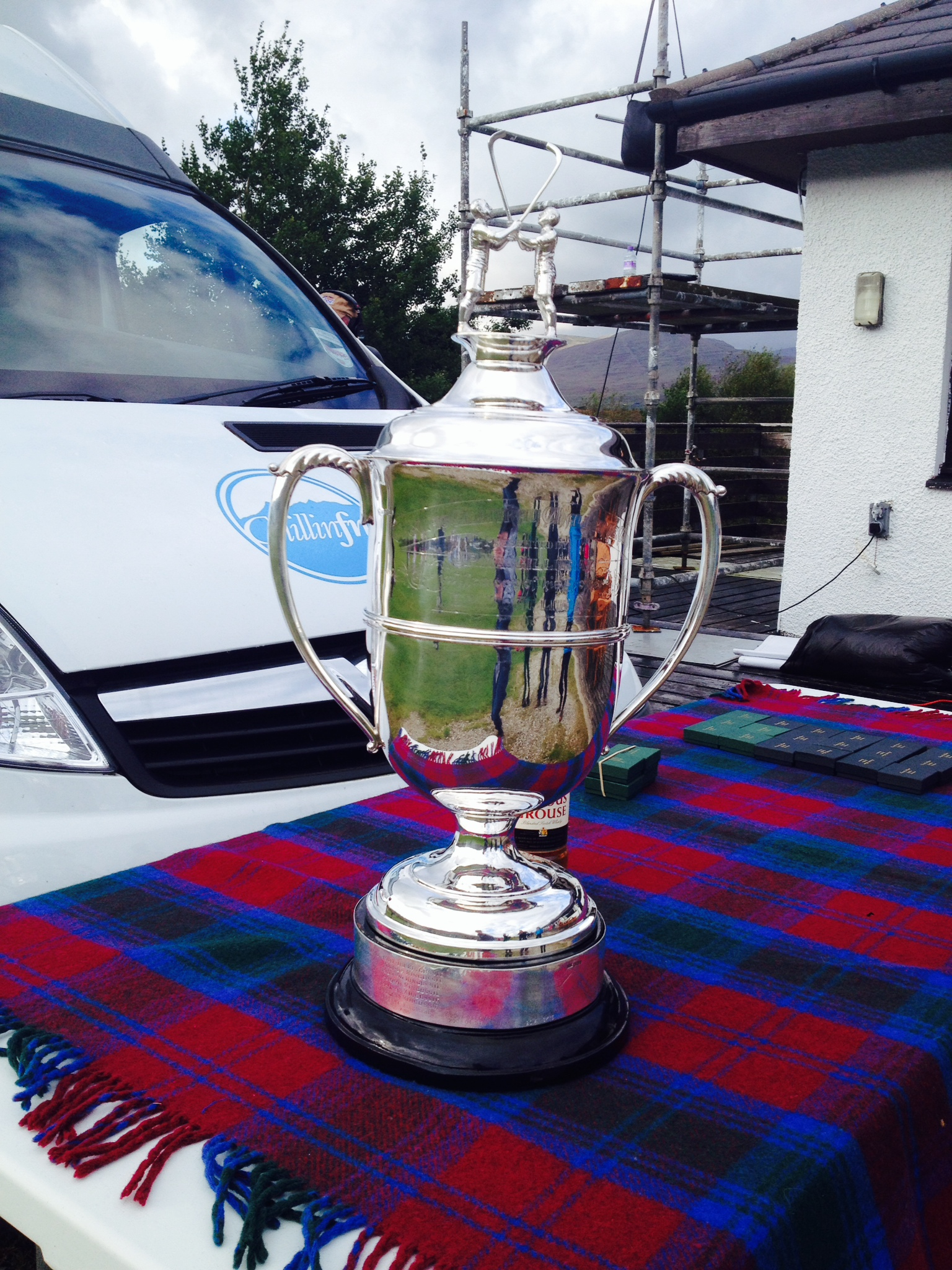
The MacGillivary Cup

== Current teams ==
The 2025 North Division 1 consisted of the following teams:

*Denotes reserve team

- Beauly Shinty Club 2nd*
- Fort William Shinty Club 2nd*
- Glenurquhart Shinty Club 2nd*
- Glengarry Shinty Club
- Inverness Shinty Club
- Kingussie Camanachd 2nd*
- Kinlochshiel Shinty Club 2nd*
- Newtonmore Camanachd Club 2nd*
- Skye Camanachd 2nd*

== History ==
1980's: North Division One the top tier of Shinty. National final between winner of North Division One and South Division One.

1996: Premier Division founded making North Division One the second tier of Shinty.

1996 to 1999: Winners of North Division One and South Division One playing in National final with eventual winner gaining promotion to Premier Division.

1999 to 2006: North Division One becomes third tier of shinty with advent of National Division One. Winners of North Division One and South Division One playing in National final with eventual winner gaining promotion to National Division One (2nd tier).

2007: North Division One once again becomes the second tier of Shinty with the folding of National Division One. Champions guaranteed promotion to the Premier Division.

2009: Ban on reserve teams being promoted abolished. Glenurquhart Reserves refuse promotion saving Lochcarron from relegation.

2010 and 2011: Winners of North Division Two refuse promotion preventing any relegations.

2013: Lochcarron take voluntary relegation leaving only six teams.

2014: North Division One once again becomes the third tier of Shinty with the reinstatement of National Division One, with North Division One champions potentially being promoted through a play-off win.

== List of winners since 2014 ==
- 2014 – Skye Camanachd 2nd
- 2015 – Fort William 2nd
- 2016 – Newtonmore Camanachd Club 2nd
- 2017 – Newtonmore Camanachd Club 2nd
- 2018 – Newtonmore Camanachd Club 2nd
- 2019 – Newtonmore Camanachd Club 2nd
- 2020 – No season due to the COVID-19 pandemic
- 2021 – Regional league system (Note: A system of regional leagues replaced all Shinty leagues during 2021 in order to reduce distances teams travelled due to the COVID-19 pandemic. Premiership clubs were placed in one of three senior leagues of six teams each.)
- 2022 – Kingussie Camanachd Club 2nd
- 2023 – Kingussie Camanachd Club 2nd
- 2024 – Strathglass Shinty Club
- 2025 – Fort William 2nd
