= Inveraray Shinty Club =

Scottish shinty club

- Full name: Inveraray Shinty Club Camanachd Inbhir Aora
- Nickname: The Aray Boys, The Royal Burgh Side
- Founded: 1877
- Ground: Winterton Park, Inveraray
- League: National Division
- 2025: 5th
- League: South Division One
- 2025: 5th
Home	Away

Inveraray Shinty Club (Camanachd Inbhir Aora) is a shinty club from Inveraray, Argyll, Scotland and its origins can be traced back to 1877. The first team plays in the National Division and the reserve team in South Division One.
