= WCA National Division One =

Marine Harvest WCA National Division One
- Country: Scotland
- Confederation: Women's Camanachd Association
- Number of clubs: 7
- Level on pyramid: 1
- Relegation to: WCA North Division Two or WCA South Division Two
- Current champions: Badenoch & Strathspey Ladies Shinty Club
- Website: www.womens-shinty.com

The WCA National Division One is the top league for women in the sport of shinty, and is run by the Women's Camanachd Association. Below that from season 2016 there was a return to regional second level set-up with a WCA North Division 2 and WCA South Division 2. All three leagues are sponsored by Marine Harvest. This progression is evidence of the fact that women's shinty is the fastest growing section in Scotland's oldest sport.

In 2016, Skye Camanachd won the league for the first time, clinching the title by comprehensively beating Aberdour Ladies 9-0 in their final league fixture at Silver Sands, Fife on Sunday 14 August 2016. The Skye team narrowly missed out on a famous double when they were beaten 4-2 by Lochaber in the Valerie Fraser Trophy later that month.

== Teams ==
At present, seven clubs compete in the league:

- Aberdour Shinty Club
- Ardnamurchan Camanachd
- Badenoch Ladies
- Glasgow Mid-Argyll
- Inverness Shinty Club
- Lochaber Camanachd
- Skye Camanachd
- Glenurquhart Shinty Club

== National Division One Winners and Runners-Up ==
- 2025: Winners: Lochaber, Runners-up Badenoch
- 2024: Winners: Badenoch, Runners-up Skye
- 2023: Winners: Badenoch, Runners-up Lochaber
- 2022: Winners: Badenoch, Runners-up Skye
- 2019: Winners: Badenoch(formerly Badenoch & Strathspey), Runners-up Skye
- 2018: Winners: Skye, Runners-up: Badenoch & Strathspey
- 2017: Winners: Skye, Runners-up: Lochaber
- 2016: Winners: Skye, Runners-up: Glasgow Mid Argyll
- 2015: Winners: Glasgow Mid Argyll, Runners-up: Badenoch & Strathspey
- 2014: Winners: Glasgow Mid Argyll, Runners-up: Skye
- 2013: Winners: Glasgow Mid Argyll,
- 2012: Winners: Glengarry,
- 2011: Winners: Glengarry,
- 2010:
- 2009: Winners: Glengarry, Runners-up: Tír Conaill Harps
- 2008:
- 2007: Winners: Glasgow Mid Argyll,
- 2006: Winners: Glengarry, Runners-up: Glasgow Mid Argyll
- 2005:

=== List of Winners ===
Club	Total	Years
Glengarry	4	2006, 2009, 2011, 2012
Glasgow Mid Argyll	4	2007, 2013, 2014, 2015
Badenoch	4	2019, 2022, 2023, 2024
Skye Camanachd	3	2016, 2017, 2018
Badenoch	2	2019, 2022
Lochaber	1	2025

=== List of Runners-Up ===
Club	Total	Years
Skye Camanachd	4	2014, 2019, 2022, 2024
Badenoch	3	2015, 2018, 2025
Glasgow Mid Argyll	2	2006, 2016
Lochaber	2	2017, 2023
Tír Conaill Harps	1	2009
