= 2018 Marine Harvest Premiership =

Marine Harvest Premiership
- Founded: 1996; 29 years ago
- Country: Scotland
- Confederation: Camanachd Association
- Number of clubs: 10
- Level on pyramid: 1
- Relegation to: National Division
- Domestic cup(s): Camanachd Cup; Macaulay Cup; MacTavish Cup; Glasgow Celtic Society Cup
- Current champions: Newtonmore Camanachd Club (2018)
- Most championships: Kingussie Camanachd (12)
- TV partners: BBC Alba; BBC Scotland
- Website: www.shinty.com

The 2018 Marine Harvest Premiership is the 22nd season of the Premier Division, the highest division in Shinty. The season began on 3 March 2018 consisting of 10 teams from across Scotland. The 4th season with Marine Harvest as title sponsors saw the reigning champions Kinlochshiel challenging for their 2nd Premiership title. 2018 Marine Harvest Premiership champions were Newtonmore Camanachd Club.

The 2018 Cup competitions competed will be the Camanachd Cup, Macaulay Cup, MacTavish Cup (North District teams only) and the Glasgow Celtic Society Cup (South District teams only).

Any team winning all 4 major trophies for which they are eligible to take part in will achieve the coveted Shinty Grand Slam.

== Teams ==
Team	Formed	Ground	Located
Caberfeidh Camanachd Club	1886	Castle Leod	Strathpeffer, Ross and Cromarty, Highland
Glenurquhart Shinty Club	1885	Blairbeg Park	Drumnadrochit, Inverness-shire, Highland
Kingussie Camanachd	1893	The Dell	Kingussie, Badenoch, Highland
Kinlochshiel Shinty Club	1958	Kirkton	Balmacara, Inverness-shire, Highland
Kyles Athletic Shinty Club	1896	The Playing Field	Tighnabruaich, Argyll and Bute
Lochaber Camanachd	1958	Spean Bridge Stadium	Spean Bridge, Lochaber, Highland
Lovat Shinty Club	1888	Balgate	Kiltarlity, Inverness-shire, Highland
Newtonmore Camanachd Club	1895	The Eilan (Eilean Bheannchair)	Newtonmore, Badenoch, Highland
Oban Camanachd	1889	Mossfield Park	Oban, Argyll and Bute
Skye Camanachd	1892	Pairc nan Laoch	Portree, Skye, Highland

== League summary ==
=== League table ===
Updated 4 February 2019

Pos	Team	Pld	W	D	L	GF	GA	+/-	Pts
1	Newtonmore	18	15	1	2	62	16	46	31
2	Kyles Athletic	18	10	4	3	50	21	29	25
3	Kinlochshiel	18	10	5	3	48	28	20	25
4	Lovat	18	11	3	4	44	26	18	25
5	Oban Camanachd	18	8	5	5	46	29	17	21
6	Kingussie	18	7	4	7	34	31	3	18
7	Lochaber	18	5	2	11	41	77	-36	12
8	Caberfeidh	18	4	2	12	37	64	-27	10
9	Skye Camanachd	18	3	2	13	27	65	-38	8
10	Glenurquhart	18	0	4	13	15	47	-32	5

=== Form ===
Updated 20 August 2018
*Last 5 matches

Team	Form
Caberfeidh	L5
Glenurquhart	L5
Kingussie	D2
Kinlochshiel	W1
Kyles Athletic	W1
Lochaber	L4
Lovat	L1
Newtonmore	W4
Oban Camanachd	W1
Skye Camanachd	L1

=== Top Scorer(s) ===
Top Scorer or Scorers only
Updated 14 August 2018

Pos	Player	Team	Games	Goals
1	Greg Matheson	Lovat	15	20
