= WCA South Division Two =

Marine Harvest WCA South Division Two
- Country: Scotland
- Confederation: Women's Camanachd Association
- Number of clubs: 6
- Level on pyramid: 2
- Promotion to: WCA National Division One
- Current champions: Glasgow Mid-Argyll
- Website: www.womens-shinty.com

The WCA South Division Two is a second-tier league for women in the sport of shinty, and is run by the Women's Camanachd Association. The league was last played for in season 2013 before a two-year experiment with a WCA National Division Two. However a growth in clubs in both the North and the South of Scotland saw season 2016 begin with return to regional second level set-up with a WCA North Division 2 and WCA South Division 2. All three leagues are sponsored by Marine Harvest. Below these divisions is the WCA Development League but this has no relegation or promotion consisting entirely of second teams and a team from the Outer Hebrides.

== Teams ==
At present, six clubs compete in the league.

- Ardnamurchan Camanachd
- Cowal and Bute
- Fort William
- Glasgow Mid-Argyll†
- Dunadd Camanachd
- Lorn Ladies Shinty Club

†Denotes a Second Team

Fort William have always been traditionally a "North" team in men's shinty and Ardnamurchan also, although they were reclassified as a South team in recent years in both the men's and women's game
