= WCA North Division Two =

Marine Harvest WCA North Division Two
- Country: Scotland
- Confederation: Women's Camanachd Association
- Number of clubs: 6
- Level on pyramid: 2
- Relegation to: WCA National Division One
- Current champions: Skye Camanachd
- Website: www.womens-shinty.com

The WCA North Division Two is a second-tier league for women in the sport of shinty, and is run by the Women's Camanachd Association. The league was last played for in season 2013 won by Skye Camanachd before a two-year experiment with a WCA National Division Two. However a growth in clubs in both the North and the South of Scotland saw season 2016 begin with return to regional second level set-up with a WCA North Division 2 and WCA South Division 2. All three leagues are sponsored by Marine Harvest. Below these divisions is the WCA Development League but this has no relegation or promotion consisting entirely of second teams and a team from the Outer Hebrides.

== Teams ==
At present, six clubs compete in the league.

- Glengarry Shinty Club
- Glenurquhart Shinty Club
- Inverness Shinty Club
- Lovat Shinty Club
- Strathglass Shinty Club
- Strathspey Camanachd
