= Oban Lorne =

Oban Lorne may refer to:

- Oban Lorn Shinty Club, a shinty club from Oban
- Oban Lorn Ladies Shinty Club, a Women's shinty club from Oban
- Oban Lorne RFC. a rugby union team from Oban
