= Valerie Fraser Trophy =

Award for women's shinty in Scotland

Valerie Fraser Camanachd Cup
- Description: Premier trophy in women's shinty played on a knock-out basis by the teams in the National Division 1 League
- Country: Scotland
- Presented by: Women's Camanachd Association

The Valerie Fraser Camanachd Cup also known as the Valerie Fraser Trophy or the Women's Camanachd Cup is the premier trophy in Women's shinty and is currently sponsored by Mowi. It is played on a knock-out basis by the teams in the National Division 1 League and is administered by the Women's Camanachd Association. The current holders are Lochaber Camanachd.

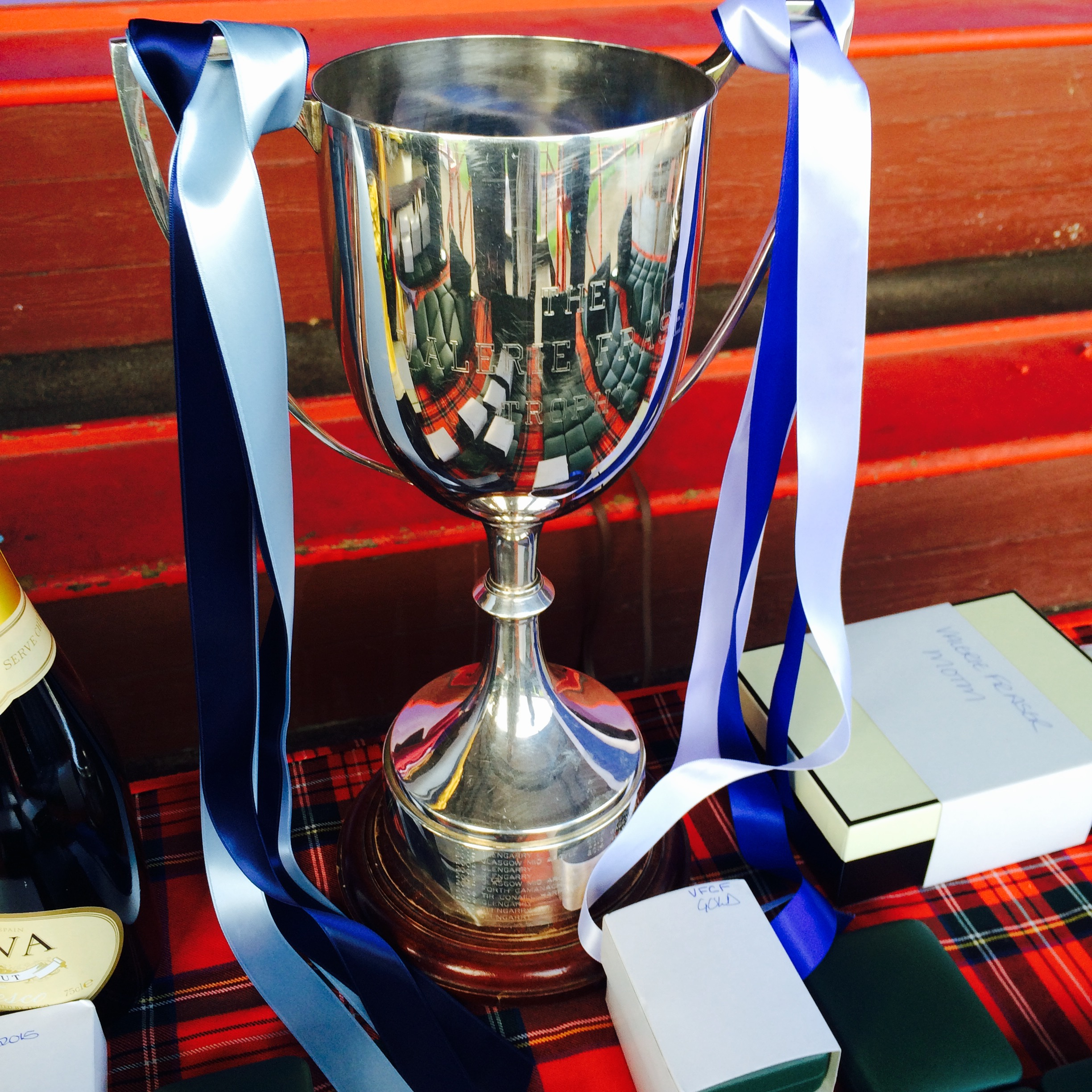
The Valerie Fraser Camanachd Cup – Blue Riband Trophy in Women's Shinty

== History ==
The trophy was originally donated to the Camanachd Association in memory of Valerie Fraser. It was originally a trophy for male teams and it was won by Glenurquhart in 1991. Some years later, after the competition fell into abeyance, it was donated to the Women's Camanachd Association and was first played for on 28 July 2002.

In 2009, the WCA held the semi-finals on one day at University of Stirling. Glengarry defeated Tir Conaill Harps 2–1 to win the 2009 Cup. There is also a national trophy for Division Two teams, the Marine Harvest Challenge Cup.

2013 saw an epic final at The Eilan, where Badenoch and Stathspey's Jane Nicol, in her final game before retirement, secured the victory over a heavily fancied Glasgow Mid-Argyll. GMA would however overcome Skye in 2014 and Badenoch in 2015 to secure League and Cup doubles.

The 2016 cup final was contested on 28 August at An Aird in Fort William between Skye Camanachd and Lochaber which meant a new name would be added to the list of winners as neither side had won the cup before. League Champions Skye were slight favourites but Lochaber won the day 4- 2, with all four of their goals coming from full-back turned forward Kirsty Delaney (6, 32, 67 and 76 mins). Lorna MacRae scored both the Skye goals (27, 74 mins). Player of the match went to Lochaber goalkeeper Aeleen Campbell for a fantastic display which prevented the Skye ladies from achieving the league and cup double.

Skye finally broke their Valerie Fraser hoodoo with a comprehensive 6–1 thumping of Lochaber at the same location, An Aird in 2017.

The sensational 2019 final between Skye and Badenoch was broadcast live on BBC Alba the Scottish Gaelic television channel.

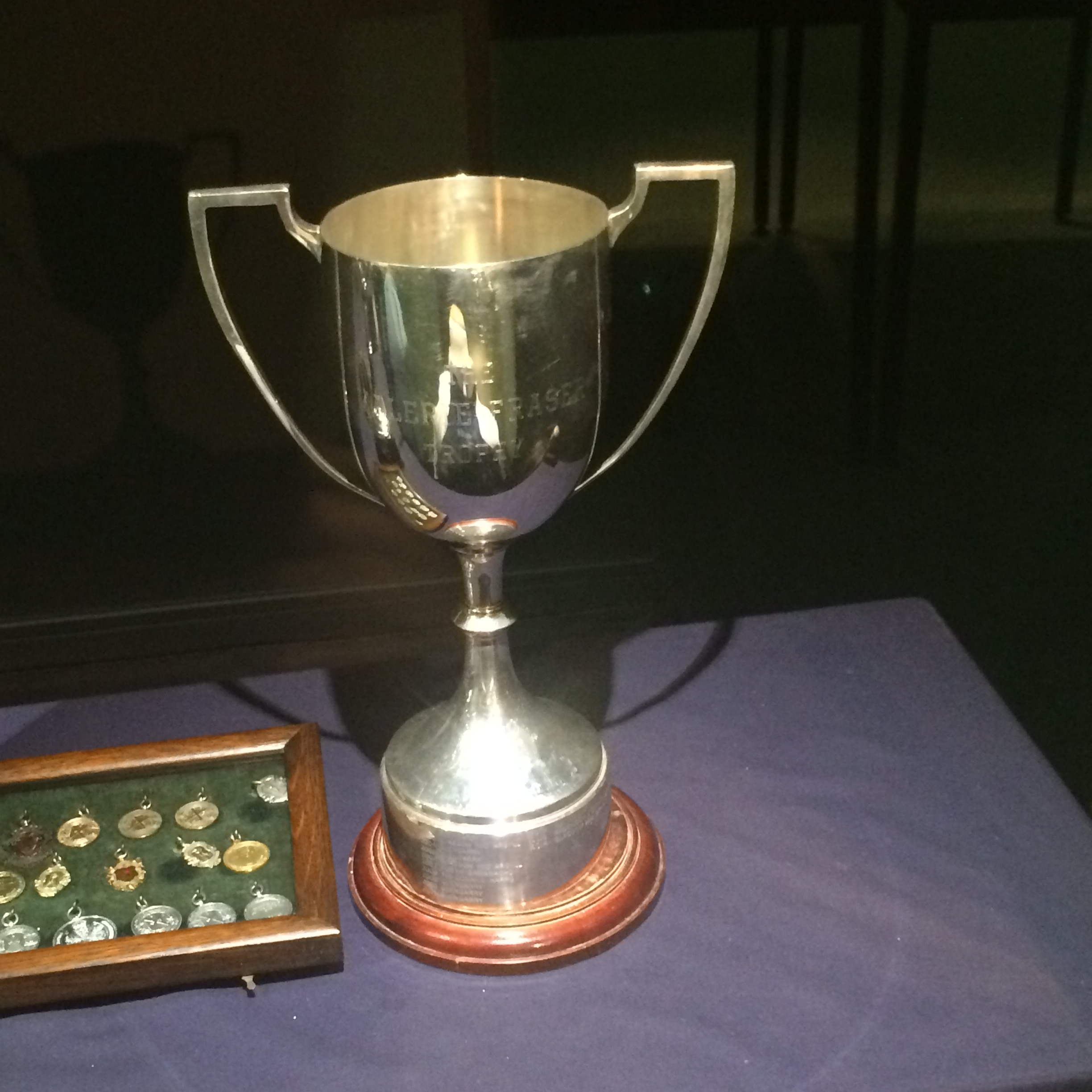
Another image of the Valerie Fraser Camanachd Cup, taken at the Shinty Exhibition in Hampden Park

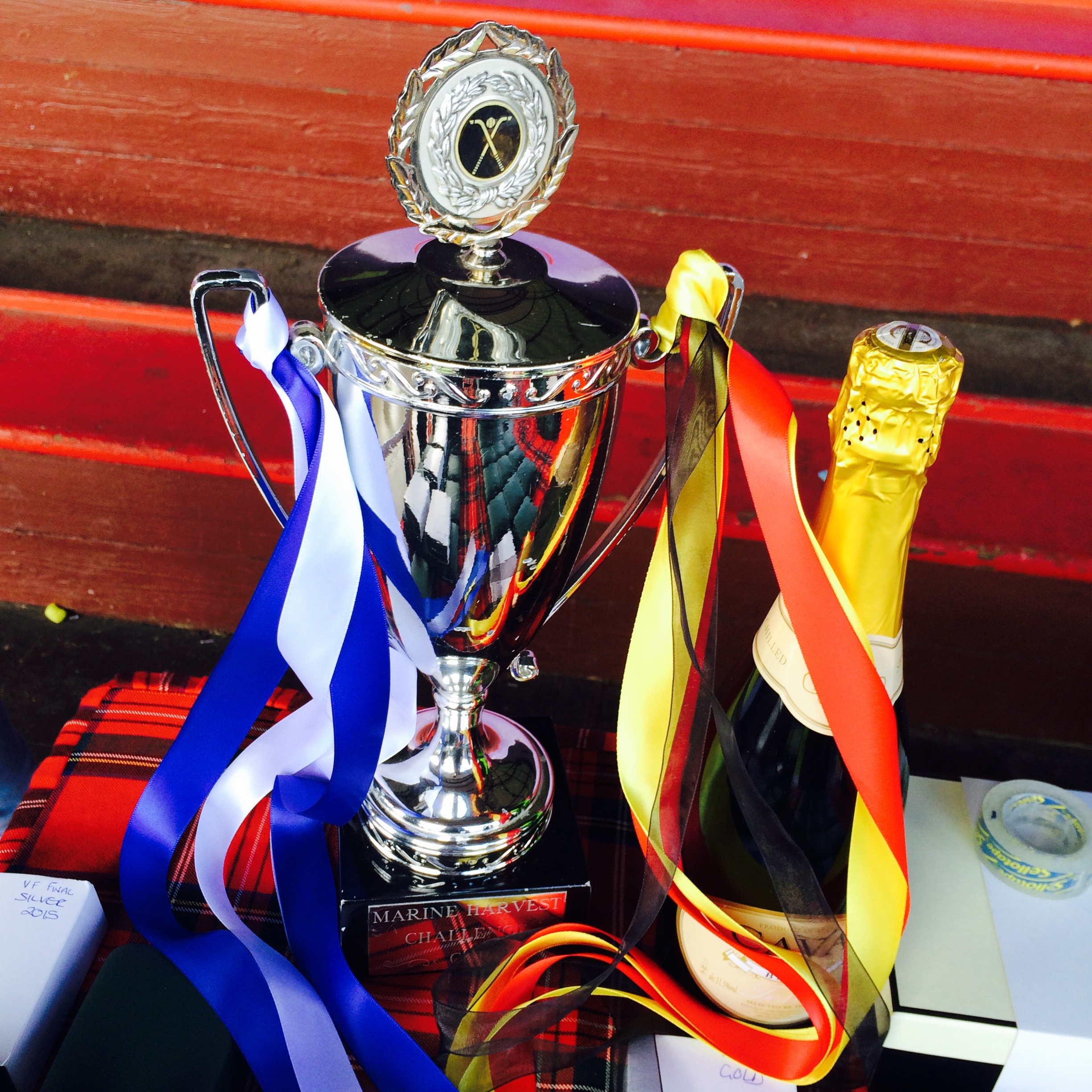
The WCA Challenge Cup – The Reserve Level Cup for Women's Shinty

== Previous winners ==
- 2026 - Badenoch 5 v 3 Kinlochsheil After Extra Time (FT 2v2), at The Eilan, Newtonmore
- 2025 - Badenoch 2 v 0 Lochaber, at The Eilan, Newtonmore
- 2024 - Lochaber 1 v 0 Badenoch, at The Eilan, Newtonmore
- 2023 - Skye Camanachd 3 v 0 Glasgow Mid Argyll, at The Eilan, Newtonmore
- 2022 - Badenoch Ladies 6 v 3 Skye Camanachd, at The Eilan, Newtonmore
- 2021 - No competition owing to COVID
- 2020 - No competition owing to COVID
- 2019 – Skye Camanachd 8 v 6 Badenoch, at The Dell, Kingussie
- 2018 – Badenoch & Strathspey 4 v 1 Skye Camanachd, at The Dell, Kingussie
- 2017 – Skye Camanachd 6 v 1 Lochaber, at An Aird, Fort William
- 2016 – Lochaber 4 v 2 Skye Camanachd, at An Aird, Fort William
- 2015 – Glasgow Mid Argyll 1 v 0 Badenoch & Strathspey, at The Bught Park, Inverness
- 2014 – Glasgow Mid Argyll 3 v 2 Skye Camanachd, at Strachurmore, Strachur
- 2013 – Badenoch & Strathspey 3 v 1 Glasgow Mid Argyll, at The Eilan, Newtownmore
- 2012 – Aberdour 4 v 3 Glengarry, at Strachurmore, Strachur
- 2011 – Glengarry 4 v 0 Aberdour, at The Eilan, Newtownmore
- 2010 – Glengarry 5 v 0 Tir Conaill Harps, at Mossfield, Oban
- 2009 – Glengarry 2 v 1 Tir Conaill Harps, at Spean Bridge
- 2008 – Tir Conaill Harps 2 v 1 Glengarry, at Jubilee Park, Ballahullish
- 2007 – Forth Camanachd 1 v 0 Glasgow Mid Argyll, at Jubilee Park, Ballahullish
- 2006 – Glasgow Mid Argyll (Runners up – Glengarry), at The Eilan, Newtonmore
- 2005 – Glengarry (Runners up – Edinburgh), at The Eilan, Newtonmore
- 2004 – Glengarry 7 v 1 Kingussie, at Spean Bridge
- 2003 – Glasgow Mid Argyll 5 v 2 Glengarry B, at Spean Bridge
- 2002 – Glengarry 7 v 0 Kingussie, at Jubilee Park, Ballahullish

=== Winners of Valerie Fraser Camanachd Cup for Women ===
Club	Total	Years
Glengarry	6	2002, 2004, 2005, 2009, 2010, 2011
Glasgow Mid Argyll	4	2003, 2006, 2014, 2015
Badenoch & Strathspey	5	2013, 2018, 2022, 2025, 2026
Skye Camanachd	3	2017, 2019, 2023
Lochaber	2	2016, 2024
Forth	1	2006
Tir Conaill Harps	1	2008
Aberdour	1	2012

=== Runners-up of Valerie Fraser Camanchd Cup for Women ===
Club	Total	Years
Skye Camanachd	4	2014, 2016, 2018, 2022
Glengarry	3	2006, 2008, 2012
Glasgow Mid Argyll	3	2007, 2013, 2023
Badenoch	3	2015, 2019, 2024 (2015 as Badenoch & Strathspey)
Kingussie	2	2002, 2004
Tir Conaill Harps	2	2009, 2010
Lochaber	2	2017, 2025
Glengarry B	1	2003
Edinburgh	1	2005
Aberdour	1	2011
Kinlochsheil	1	2026

=== Winners of the Player of the Match Award ===
- 2026 - Elizabeth McGregor (Badenoch)
- 2025 - Rona Stewart (Badenoch)
- 2024 - Hannah MacDonald (Lochaber)
- 2023 - Caitlin Maclean (Skye Camanachd)
- 2022 - Sarah Jane Ferguson (Skye Camanachd)
- 2021 - No competition owing to COVID
- 2020 - No competition owing to COVID
- 2019 - Lorna MacRae (Skye Camanachd)
- 2018 – Kristy Deans (Badenoch & Strathspey)
- 2017 – Lorna MacRae (Skye Camanachd)
- 2016 – Aeleen Campbell (Lochaber)
- 2015 – Kristy Deans (Badenoch & Strathspey)
- 2014 – Sarah Corrigall (Skye Camanachd)
- 2013 – Rachel McCafferty (Glasgow Mid Argyll)
- 2012 – Katy Smith (Aberdour)
- 2011 – Laura Gallacher (Glengarry)
- 2010 – Elaine Wink (Glengarry)
- 2009 – Beth MacDonald (Glengarry)
- 2008 – Sarah Corrigall (Glengarry)
- 2007 – Katy Smith (Forth)
- 2006 – Kirsten Munro (Glasgow Mid Argyll)
- 2005 – Jane Nicol (Glengarry)
- 2004 – Sarah Corrigall (Glengarry)
- 2003 – Katie Drain (Glasgow Mid Argyll)
- 2002 – Cara Dallas (Kingussie)

== Previous winners of men's competition ==
- 1995 Beauly 2 v 0 Strathglass
- 1994 ? bt Strathglass
- 1993 ?
- 1992 Kinlochshiel
- 1991 Glenurquhart bt Glengarry
- 1990 Glenurquhart bt Glengarry
- 1989 ? bt Strathglass
- 1988 Caberfeidh
- 1987 Caberfeidh
