= Glen Urquhart High School =

Coordinates: 57.3282°N 4.4847°W

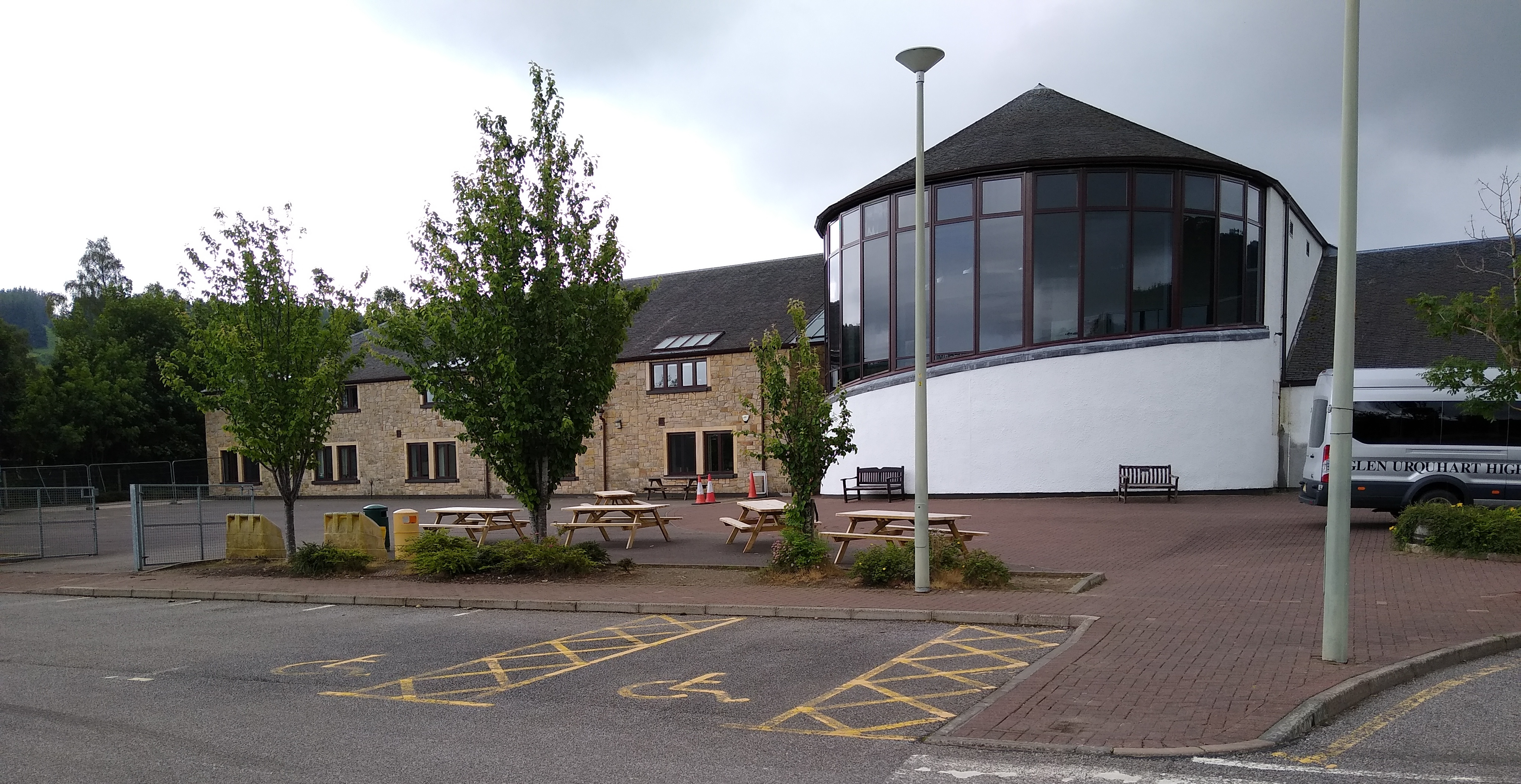

Location
- Glen Urquhart High School; Highland; Drumnadrochit, IV63 6XA; Scotland

Information
- Established: 1893
- Authority: The Highland Council
- Head teacher: Alan Bruce
- Gender: Mixed
- Age: 11 to 18
- Enrollment: 208
- Website: glenurquharthigh.co.uk

Glen Urquhart High School is a six-year comprehensive secondary school situated in Drumnadrochit. The school's primary catchment area ranges from Abriachan in the north to Invermoriston in the south, and as far west as Cannich and Tomich. Its associated Primary schools are Glenurquhart, Balnain and Cannich Bridge.

== History ==
Glenurquhart Public School was established in 1877 in the Culanloan area of Drumnadrochit. A secondary department was later added in 1893 with Benjamin Skinner given responsibility for organising the secondary curriculum. A new building was constructed for the primary department in 1975, and since 1980 Glenurquhart Primary School has existed as a separate entity. After over a century in the Culanloan building, the school moved into a new building in 2002. The design of the new building is nearly identical to that of Ardnamurchan High School as they were built at a similar time.

== Notable former students and staff ==
- Peter English, scientist, shinty player and social historian
- Michael Fraser, footballer and shinty player
- Fraser MacKenzie, journalist and shinty player
- Eddie Tembo, shinty player
- Stuart MacKintosh, shinty player and musician
- Hugh Fraser, long-serving former head teacher
- A.C. MacKell, long-serving former head teacher and author
- Paul Milton, long-serving former head teacher
- Joan Nelson, long-serving former teacher and head teacher
