= Archibald Robertson =

Archibald or Archie Robertson may refer to:

== Sports ==
- Arthur Robertson (athlete) (1879–1957), British runner who competed at the 1908 Summer Olympics; some sources report "Archie" as his nickname
- Archie Robertson (footballer) (1929–1978), Scottish footballer
- Lammie Robertson (Archibald Lamond Robertson, 1947-2023), Scottish footballer
- Archie Robertson (shinty player) (born 1950), ex-shinty player

== Others ==
- Archibald Robertson (painter) (1765–1835), Scottish born painter who operated the Columbian Academy of Painting in New York with his brother Alexander
- Archibald Robertson (physician) (1789–1864), Scottish physician; grandfather of the bishop
- Archibald Robertson (bishop) (1853–1931), Principal of King's College London and Bishop of Exeter
- Archibald Thomas Robertson (1863–1934), American theologian
- Archibald Robertson (atheist) (1886–1961), British atheist, son of the bishop
- Archie Robertson (trade unionist) (1886–1961), English trade unionist
- Rev. A. E. Robertson (1870–1958), first person to "bag" Scotlands 283 peaks

== See also ==
- Robertson (surname)
