= Fraser MacKenzie =

Fraser MacKenzie (born 1973) is a shinty player and manager from Lochcarron, Scotland. He originally played for Lochcarron Camanachd and was also Scotland manager. He is currently co manager of Glenurquhart.

== Playing career ==
Fraser MacKenzie was an important player in the Lochcarron team of the late 1990s and early 2000s. He was also manager of the club for a long time, combining this with playing.

MacKenzie was formerly a long term manager of the Scotland national shinty team and had a strong record in the shinty/hurling international series. He retired from this post to dedicate time to Base Jumping.

He has recently signed for Glenurquhart. He is not to be confused with Fraser MacKenzie, the shinty journalist who is also involved with the Drumnadrochit club.

He also provided commentary on the BBC coverage of the Macaulay Cup final in 2011.

As shinty is an amateur sport, MacKenzie has combined his playing and management career with employment in the army where he served in the Queens Own Highlanders and the Highlanders before he moved into the communications industry. He is a director of Future Communications.
