= Women's shinty =

Type of women's sport

Tír Conaill Harps in action.

Women's shinty is a sport, played almost entirely within Scotland, identical to the men's game of shinty, with the same rules, same sized pitch and same equipment. It is administered by the Women's Camanachd Association (Camanachd nam Ban).

== History ==
In the 1990s, teams from Glengarry, Oban and Dunadd were beginning to play each other, this resulted in the Women's Camanachd Association being set up to run the league and cup system discretely from the men's game, as well as the addition of women to the board of the Camanachd Association in 2023.

== Competition structure ==
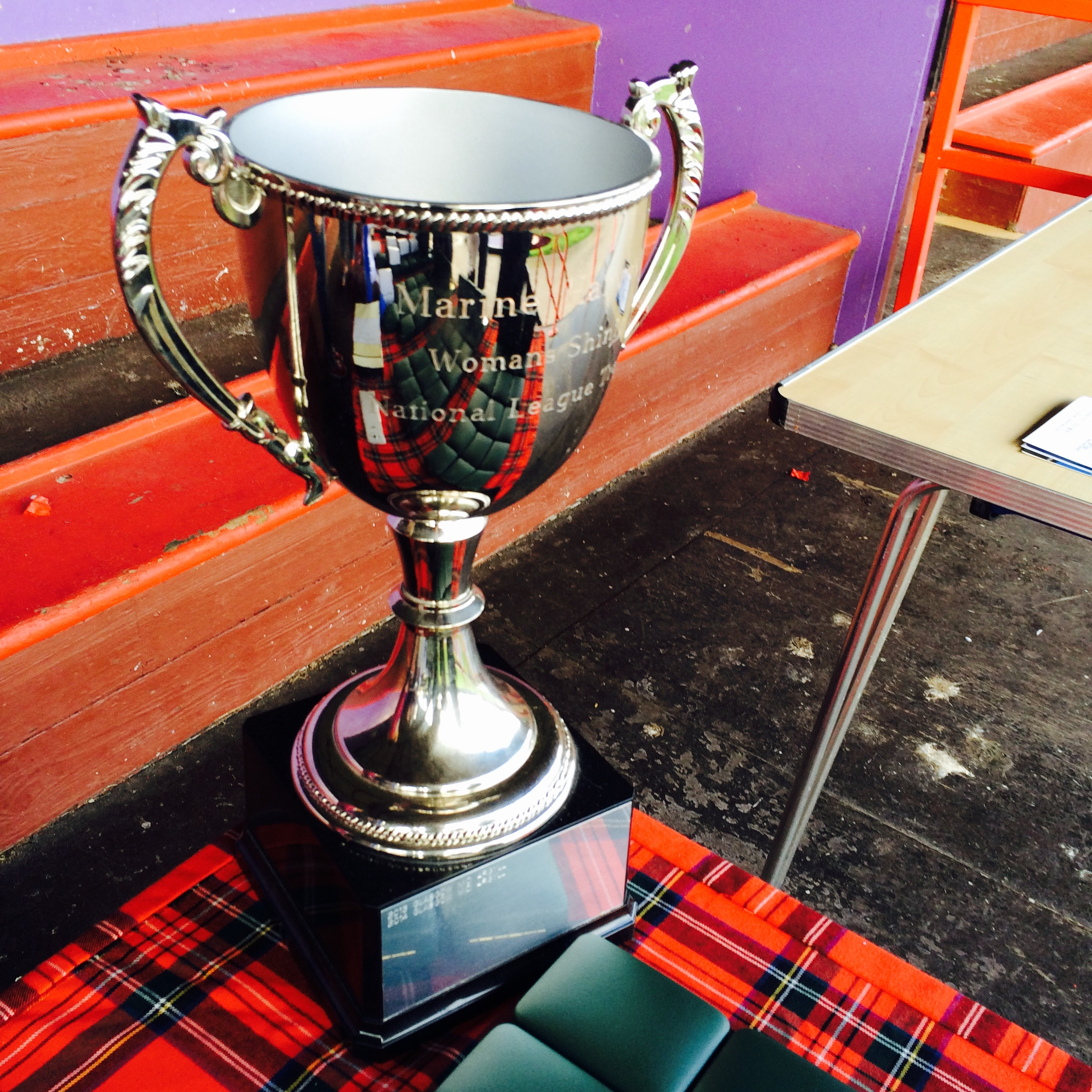
The Trophy for the WCA Women's Shinty National League

=== League ===
Dunadd, Glengarry and Oban Camancheroes made up the first league. The league has now expanded to cover most of the major shinty playing areas.

Until 2013, there was a National league one, with teams of 10 a-side, with two regional divisions, based on the sport's traditional North and South Districts, in which teams played 8 a-side. This however, often led to very small leagues and a lack of games which resulted in stilted growth for the game.

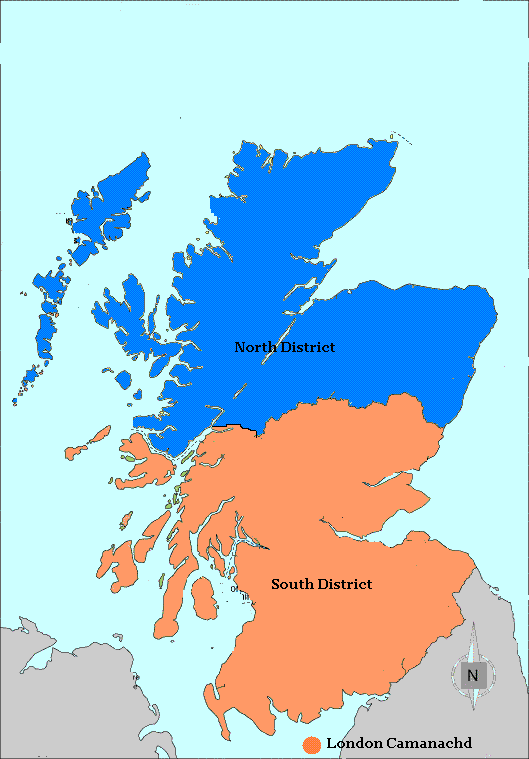
The North/South divisions in Scotland

In 2014, the WCA amalgamated the North and South Divisions Two into National Division Two. This, along with the promotion of Skye and Lochaber to National Division One, resulted in two sizeable leagues allowing for more regular play.

==== National Division One 2014 ====
- Glasgow Mid-Argyll
- Aberdour
- Skye Camanachd
- Lochaber
- Glengarry
- Badenoch & Strathspey

==== National Division Two 2014 ====
- Oban Lorn
- Lovat
- Ardnamurchan
- Glasgow Mid-Argyll†
- Strathglass
- Dunadd Camanachd
- Cowal & Bute

†Denotes reserve team

=== Cup ===
- Valerie Fraser Trophy – The equivalent of the men's Camanachd Cup for the women's game. However a club need only win two games to win it. In order to increase the number of teams competing, Division Two teams were permitted entry in 2012. It has been sponsored by Peter Gow of Inverness for several years.
- Women's Camanachd Association Challenge Cup – A cup for Division Two and reserve sides. Sponsored by Mowi.

=== Representative ===
There are North and South representative games at senior and U-18 level. These are one of the few 12 a-side games played in the women's game. These are traditionally played in Oban.

== International links ==
There are also international compromise rules games against camogie teams. In recent years the gap with the Irish Camogie sides has been too great and so the Scotland national side now usually face British Universities GAA. In 2013, Scotland faced Dublin Camogie.

== See also ==
- Camogie
