= Nairnshire Camanachd =

Nairnshire
- Full name: Nairnshire Camanachd
- Founded: 2006
- Ground: Community Playing Fields, Nairn
- League: Defunct (2007)
Home	Away

Nairnshire Camanachd was a Shinty Club playing in Nairn, Scotland. They were formed in 2006 as a result of the opening of the Community Playing Fields at Nairn Academy but folded after a season where they finished 3rd in North Division Three despite leading until the last day of the season.

== History ==
In its first season the club participated in the Marine Harvest North Division Three. The club was also awarded Club of The Month for April 2006, by the Camanachd Association, in which clubs in all divisions were considered, this was considered a great honour for such a new club.

The club missed out narrowly on winning the league however, due to Lochaber Camanachd benefiting from a late surge in form, and more controversially, a run of walkover results, allowing them to leapfrog Nairnshire.

The club withdrew from senior shinty to concentrate upon developing youth shinty in Nairn. However, as of 2011 the club may be considered totally defunct. ]
