= Lochcarron Camanachd =

Lochcarron
- Full name: Lochcarron Camanachd
- Gaelic name: Comann Camanachd Loch Carrainn
- Nickname: The Kishorn Camandoes
- Founded: 1883
- Ground: Battery Park, Lochcarron
Home	Away

Lochcarron Camanachd is a shinty club from Wester Ross, Scotland.

== History ==
Founded in 1883, Lochcarron Camanachd is one of the oldest in the west Highlands. In its first century the Club won the Strathdearn Cup eight times and the Sutherland Cup six times as well as winning its league division on many occasions.

The early nineties were a particular success for Lochcarron, as having temporarily reduced to one team, they went from North Division Four to the Premier Division in quick succession.

The first team reached the club's only senior final, the Macaulay Cup final in 2001, where they were beaten 3–0 by Inveraray. They then won the National First Division Championship in 2002 and the Balliemore Cup also in 2002. Amongst the key players in this era were Kenny Ross and Fraser MacKenzie. The club was voted Marine Harvest Club of the Year 2002. The club was chosen as the Highland Sports Development Association Club of the Year 2003, a first for the sport of shinty. The club also secured a third spot finish in the Premier Division. However, the club then went into decline, narrowly avoiding relegation in 2006. After finishing bottom of the Premier Division, they had to defeat Kyles Athletic in a playoff.

The club was relegated in 2007 after a prolonged season, with their final match being played against Inveraray in Kiltarlity on 8 December 2007 – a 2–2 draw was not enough to overhaul Oban Camanachd. The club only finished 4th in North Division One in 2008 and was threatened with relegation again at the end of the 2009 season to North Division Two. This would have had far reaching repercussions for the club which would have seen their second team (which had failed to fulfil several fixtures) be disbanded.

However, the club received a reprieve from relegation as Glenurquhart rejected the chance to have their reserve team promoted from North Division Two despite new bye-laws permitting reserve sides to do this. The club retained its place in North One for 2010 and also retained its second team. The club was rocked early in 2010 by the resignation of Alasdair "Gaiter" MacKenzie as manager, he was swiftly replaced by Murdo John Fraser.

After a few tough seasons, the decision was made to start again at the bottom of the Shinty League System in 2013. This voluntary relegation did not start smoothly with two heavy defeats and then a draw to lowly Lewis. However, Lochcarron soon adapted to their new surroundings and clinched promotion as well as appearing in the Sutherland Cup final which they lost to fellow voluntary relegated team Ballachulish. However, co-manager Kenny Murray left for Lewis Camanachd as Ross Brown came in as manager. League reconstruction saw the Camandoes promoted twice, ahead of their desired development, and they inevitably finished the 2015 season at the bottom of North Division One.

Reconstruction was slow and arduous, but 2016 saw the club begin to recover and win the Strathdearn Cup against Glenurquhart.

Today the club has a reputation for its youth development and represents shinty in Sportscotland’s national youth sports programme. The club actively supports shinty at both its local senior school Plockton High and Lochcarron Primary School and through the recently formed Ross & Sutherland Shinty Development Association. The club plays at the Battery Park in Lochcarron (opposite the Bank of Scotland) on its newly extended pitch, complete with modern changing rooms.

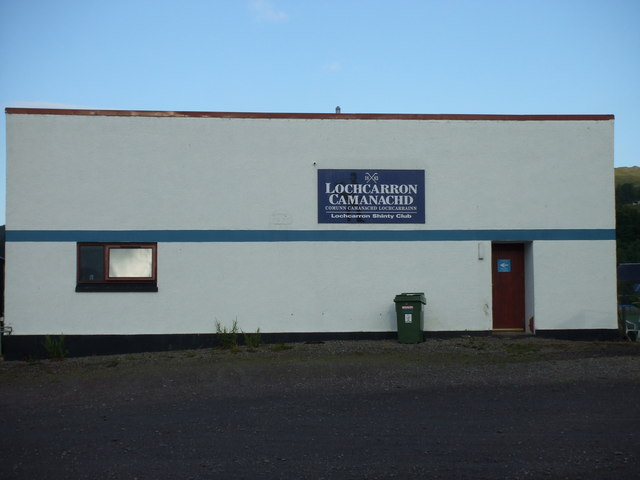
Battery Park

Lochcarron have local rivals Kinlochshiel in which they compete annually in the Tommy Ross memorial cup. The club has a large amount of MacKenzies involved with the club and the varying different families are often differentiated by inter-generational nicknames, such as "Ham", "Jek" and "Gaiter".

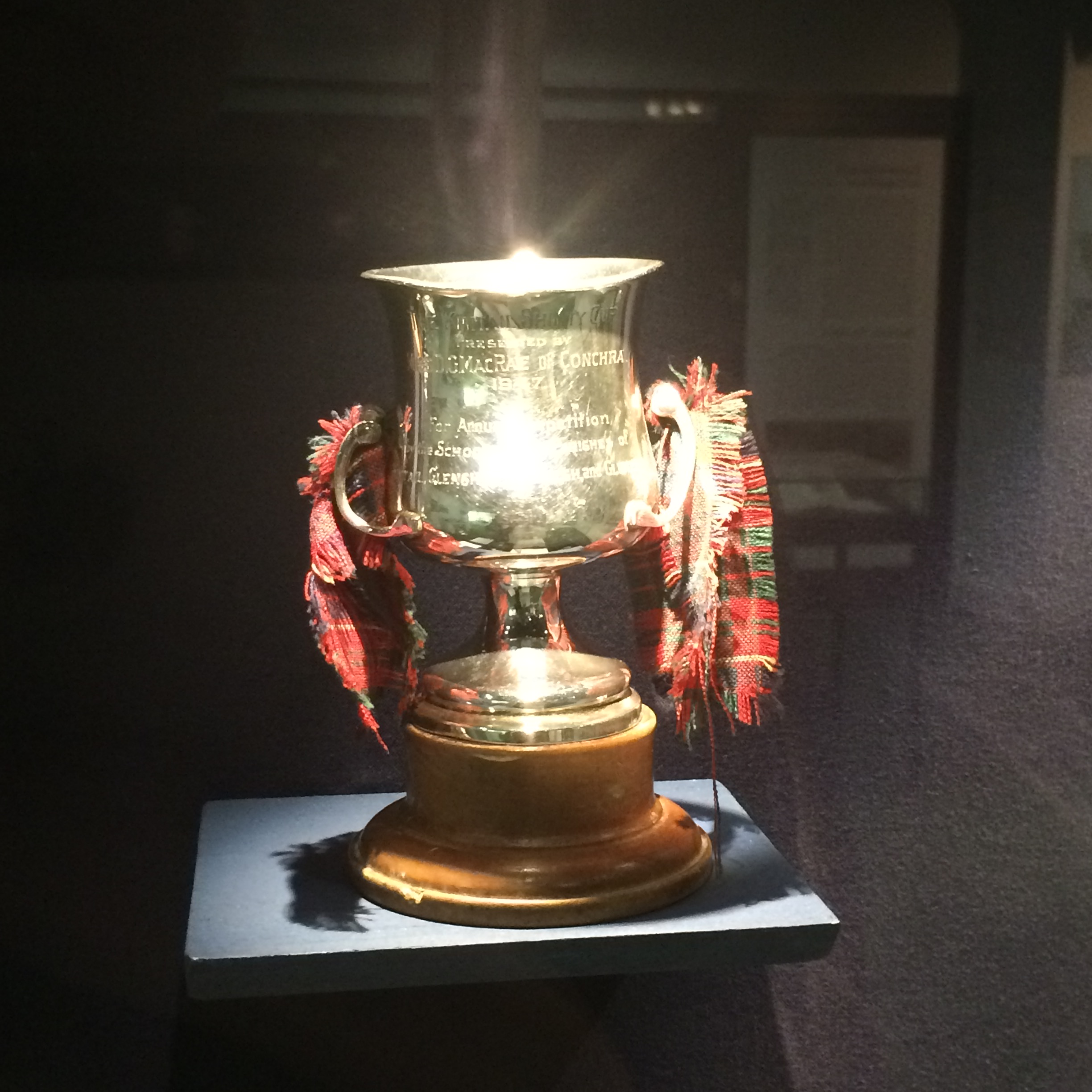
The Conchra Cup - A small shinty trophy played for by teams from Loch Alsh and Lochcarron
