= Glen Urquhart (disambiguation) =

Glen Urquhart or Glenurquhart is a geographical area of the Highlands of Scotland.

Glen Urquhart may also refer to:

- Glen Urquhart (politician) (born 1948), Republican Party candidate for the United States House of Representatives election in 2010
- Glenurquhart Shinty Club, a shinty club which plays in Drumnadrochit
- Glen Urquhart High School, a secondary school in Drumnadrochit, Scotland
- Glen Urquhart School, a school in Massachusetts, USA
