= Highland 2007 =

Highland 2007 was a year-long celebration of the culture of the Scottish Highlands which took place throughout 2007. It involved local communities throughout the Highlands and Islands as well as people across Scotland, the UK and beyond.

== Background ==
The concept of 2007 as 'Scotland's Year of Highland Culture' was suggested by then First Minister of the Scottish Parliament, Jack McConnell. During the Convention of the Highlands and Islands in 2003, he declared that he was so impressed by the momentum built up by the failed Inverness/Highlands bid to be European Capital of Culture 2008, that he would back a celebration of Highland culture in 2007.

Its proponents had claimed that Highland 2007 would bring significant economic and social benefits which would endure well beyond the celebrations themselves. However, an evaluation report stated that there were "Criticisms from some promoters about aspects of the funding process and from within the Gaelic community about its failure to capitalise more on the opportunities on offer."

The Inverness Museum and Art Gallery was re-designed in time for Highland 2007, opening after six months of closure to allow a £1.3m makeover.

== Events ==
The programme of events developed for Highland 2007 encompassed the Arts, the Environment, Heritage, Language, Science and Sport. Street Parties, a rededication of Culloden Battlefield, a homecoming for expatriate Orcadians, a marathon in Inverness and a showcase of Gaelic Song with Anne Lorne Gilles were planned. Rock band Runrig played at Drumnadrochit. The programme also included The Vital Spark Interpretation Conference - an event which saw heritage interpreters from across the world meeting for three days in Aviemore.

Events began on 12 January 2007 with a street party held in Inverness. Bad weather was to curtail the street party. A reenactment of the historic shinty match between Strathglass Shinty Club and Glenurquhart Shinty Club was planned to take place at the Bught Park earlier that day, but a waterlogged pitch cause the shinty match to be put off until 2008, when it was then cancelled again.
