= Cowal (disambiguation) =

Cowal is a peninsula, a geographical region in the south of Argyll and Bute, within the Scottish Highlands.

Cowal may also refer to:

== Places ==
Australia

- Lake Cowal, largest inland lake in New South Wales.

Indonesia

== Ships ==
- MV Cowal, a hoist-loading vehicle ferry operated by the Caledonian Steam Packet Company

== Other uses ==
- Cowal Community Hospital, the hospital serving the Cowal Peninsula
- Cowal Highland Gathering, held in Dunoon, Cowal
- Loch Lomond and Cowal Way, long distance waymarked way, between Portavadie and Inveruglas, Cowal
- Glasgow Cowal, a defunct shinty club, founded in 1876
- Cowal and Bute (shinty), women's shinty club based in Dunoon
