= Women's Camanachd Association Challenge Cup =

- Description: Second-tier trophy in women's shinty played on a knock-out basis by the teams in the National Division 2 Leagues
- Country: Scotland
- Presented by: Women's Camanachd Association

The Women's Camanachd Association (WCA) Challenge Cup is the second-tier trophy in women's shinty. It is currently sponsored by Mowi (formerly Marine Harvest) who have sponsored the cup since 2014. It is played on a knock-out basis by the teams in the National Division 2 Leagues and is administered by the Women's Camanachd Association. The current holders are Inverness.

The Challenge Cup is usually played just before the Women's Shinty Premier Cup competition. The Valerie Fraser Trophy and the two cup finals form a showpiece event in the women's shinty calendar.

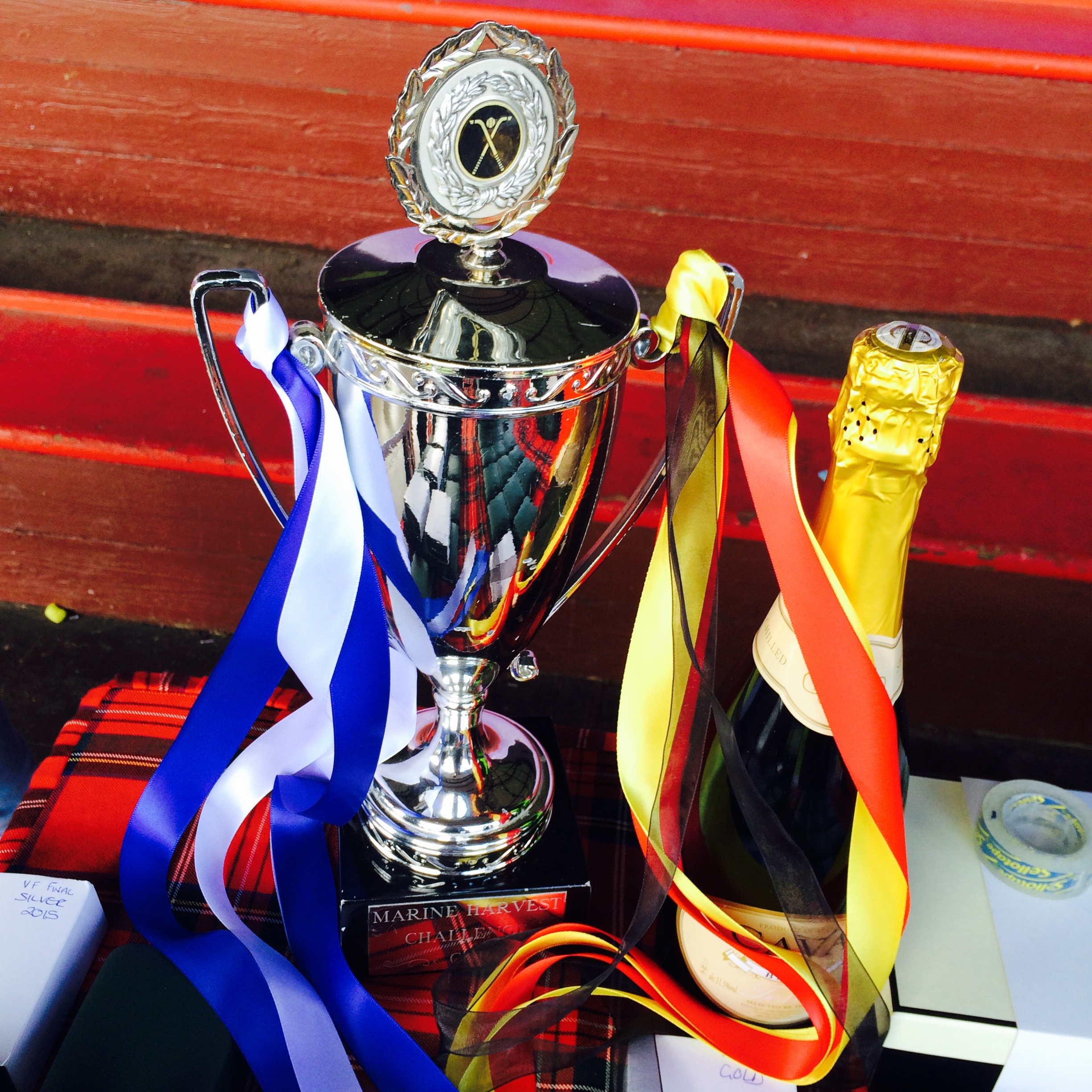
The WCA Challenge Cup - the second tier cup for women's shinty

== Final history ==
The trophy has been played for since 2012, when Lochaber defeated Strathglass in the final in the inaugural final.

Strathglass were successful in 2013, beating Glasgow Mid Argyll.

The following year Strathglass retained the trophy, this time beating Lovat 6–4 in the final.

The 2015 final was an exciting affair. After a goalless first half, Lauren Pike put GMA in front before Kate Bradley retaliated for Ardnamurchan. Carolanne Cameron then gave Ardnamurchan team the lead with just four minutes left. In the final minute Kirsty Gray equalised and the game went to extra time. The drama continued when Geraldine Murphy gave the lead back to GMA before Cameron scored again for the west highlanders. GMA triumphed 2–0 in the penalty shout out.

Lovat secured their first Challenge Cup win with a comprehensive 7–1 victory over Strathglass in 2016.

The 2017 final saw the 2015 runners-up Ardnamurchan again lose out this time to Glengarry who put their name on the trophy for the first time with an emphatic 7–1 win which included a five-minute hat-trick from Leona Falconer.

In 2018 two players scored hat-tricks in the final. Glenurguhart teenager Abby Stoddart got hers in the first half. Inverness's Katie Macmillan achieved the same feat but the decisive Glenurquhart goal came from Hazel Hunter's 50th-minute penalty.

The 2019 final saw Inverness fall at the final hurdle again, and again two players scored hat-tricks. This time the victors were Lovat who ran out 7-1 winners. Fiona Urquhart and Lovat captain Laura Gallacher both scored hat-tricks.

== Previous winners ==
- 2025 - Badenoch 7 v 5 Inverness, The Eilan, Newtonmore
- 2024 - Inverness 3 v 1 Badenoch, The Eilan, Newtonmore
- 2023 - Kinlochsheil 14 v 1 Inverness, The Eilan, Newtonmore
- 2022 - Kinlochsheil 4 v 0 Lovat, The Eilan, Newtonmore
- 2021 - No competition due to Covid
- 2020 - No competition due to Covid
- 2019 - Lovat 7 v 1 Inverness, The Dell, Kingussie
- 2018 - Glenurquhart 4 v 3 Inverness, The Dell, Kingussie
- 2017 - Glengarry 7 v 1 Ardnamurchan, An Aird, Fort William
- 2016 - Lovat 7 v 1 Strathglass, An Aird, Fort William
- 2015 - Glasgow Mid Argyll 3 v 3 (A.E.T.) Ardnamurchan, The Bught, Inverness (GMA won 2–0 on penalties)
- 2014 - Strathglass 6 v 4 Lovat, Strachurmore
- 2013 - Strathglass bt Glasgow Mid Argyll, Eilan, Newtonmore
- 2012 - Lochaber bt Strathglass

== Winners of Challenge Cup for Women ==
Club	Total	Years
Strathglass	2	2013, 2014
Kinlochshiel	2	2022, 2023
Lovat	2	2016, 2019
Badenoch	1	2025
Inverness	1	2024
Lochaber	1	2012
Glasgow Mid Argyll	1	2015
Glengarry	1	2017
Glenurquhart	1	2018

== Runners-up of Challenge Cup for Women ==
Club	Total	Years
Inverness	4	2018, 2019, 2023, 2025
Strathglass	2	2012, 2016
Ardnamurchan	2	2015, 2017
Lovat	2	2014, 2022
Glasgow Mid Argyll	1	2013
Badenoch	1	2024
