= Urquhart =

Urquhart may refer to:

- Urquhart (surname), a surname
- Clan Urquhart, a Scottish clan

== Places ==
- Urquhart, Moray, a village in the parish of Urquhart in the county of Moray, Scotland
- Urquhart and Glenmoriston, a parish in the county of Inverness-shire, Highland, Scotland
  - Urquhart Castle
- Urquhart and Logie Wester, a parish in the county of Ross and Cromarty, Scotland
- Urquhart, Georgia, a community in the United States

== See also ==
- Glen Urquhart (disambiguation)
