= William Cowie =

William Cowie may refer to:

- William Cowie (bishop) (1831–1902), New Zealand bishop
- William Cowie (merchant) (1849–1910), Scottish engineer, mariner and businessman
- William Cowie (rugby union) (1926–2026), Scottish rugby union player
- Willie Cowie (born 1962), shinty player
