= Stuart MacKintosh =

Stuart MacKintosh (born 20 July 1986) AKA Smack, is a shinty player and musician from Drumnadrochit, Loch Ness, Scotland. He plays in goal for Glenurquhart Shinty Club and he is the current Scotland goalkeeper.

== Shinty career ==
MacKintosh has played for Glenurquhart Shinty Club from an early age. He has been a specialist goalkeeper for most of his career and holds the record for the number of appearances at Under 21 level in the annual Shinty/Hurling series. He made his full debut for Scotland in 2010.

He was appointed Glenurquhart captain for the 2011 season. He was captain when they won the MacAulay Cup in 2012 and played in goals for their 2015 MacTavish Cup win.

== Musical career ==
MacKintosh is lead accordionist for Scottish Folk-Rock band, Schiehallion and has played on all their releases to date. He is also a qualified joiner according to the band's website. In early 2010 his musical career became entangled with his shinty career when he was abducted by Skye Camanachd players and almost missed a gig.

As well as Schihallion, Mackintosh has started his own new band 'The Gritters' and have released their debut album 'The Grit That Makes The Pearl' in April 2011. Band website, http://thegritters.co.uk/

In 2013, Mackintosh joined with folk singer Davy Holt for the shinty themed band 'Caman'. They continue to tour.

=== Discography ===
Nae Union 2008

Calum's Dream 2010

Scotland Forever (DVD) 2011

The Grit That Makes The Pearl 2011
