= Kenny Ross =

Scottish shanty player

Kenneth Ross (born 1970), is a shinty player from Achnasheen, Scotland. He plays for Newtonmore but spent the vast majority of his career at Lochcarron Camanachd and is that club's most capped player. He was also assistant manager of the Scotland national shinty team between 2009 and 2013.

== Playing career ==
Ross' father, Ronnie, also played for Lochcarron and Ross had an immediate impact as Lochcarron rose through the leagues in the 1990s. He was voted North Player of the Year two years in succession in 2001 and 2002 as Lochcarron entered the Premier Division. He captained the side as they won the Balliemore Cup in 2006.

Although he only gained his first cap at the age of 30 in 2000, he became a stalwart of the national Shinty/Hurling team and gained nine caps before retiring from outfield play. He moved to the position of goalkeeper for Lochcarron. He transferred to Newtonmore for the 2014 season.

Ross has employment outside of the game as a gamekeeper.
