= Oban Lorn Shinty Club =

Shinty club

Oban Lorn
- Full name: Oban Lorn Shinty Club
- Gaelic name: Comann Camanachd Latharnach an Obain
- Nickname: Lorn
- Founded: 2015
- Ground: Ganavan, Oban
Home

Oban Lorn Shinty Club was a shinty club from Oban, Scotland. It was founded in 2014 and competed in the South Division Two in 2015. The side continued until 2017, where it finished 3rd in South Division Two. The majority of the club became absorbed into Oban Celtic for the 2018 season

== History ==
There have been other clubs with the name Oban Lorn in existence before. A previous Oban Lorn Athletic won the Glasgow Celtic Society Cup in 1955.

In 2014, Lorn Ladies began, but there is no official connection between the two clubs.

Lorn was the third men's club in Oban, joining Oban Camanachd and Oban Celtic in the league. They performed admirably in their maiden season finishing 5th. They continued to improve finishing third in 2016 and 2017. However, the club became Oban Celtic's second team in 2018, with the Lorn name going into abeyance.
