= Eddie Tembo =

Scottish shinty player

Eddie Tembo (born 1980) is a Zambian-born Scottish international shinty player from the village of Drumnadrochit.

He plays for Glenurquhart Shinty Club and was a member of the North Division One Championship side in 2008. In 2008, he was selected for the Compromise rules Shinty/Hurling international with Ireland, in being so he became the first black person and first person of Zambian birth to represent Scotland at shinty. He scored a point on his debut.
