= Milton, Glenurquhart =

Coordinates: 57.339°N 4.504°W

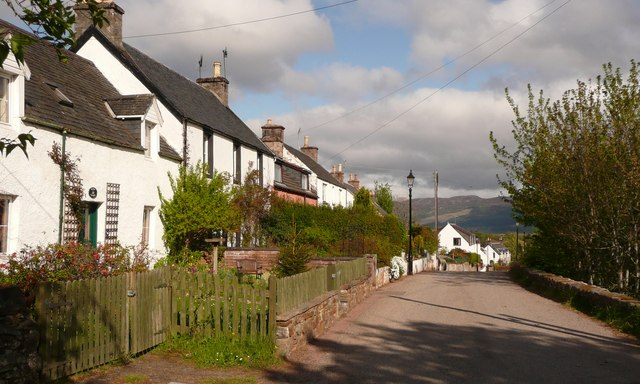
The main street in Milton

Milton (Scottish Gaelic: Baile a' Mhuilinn) is a village in Glenurquhart, to the west of the village of Drumnadrochit, in the Highland council area of Scotland. It lies on the north side of the River Enrick, next to the A831 road.

== History ==
Much of Glenurquhart was part of the Balmacaan Estate (also known as the Glen Urquhart Estate), owned by the Grant family of Seafield between 1509 and 1946. The estate was rented to the wealthy American industrialist and local benefactor Bradley Martin late 19th and early 20th centuries and flourished in the 1880s and 1890s, but went into decline after the 1920s. The estate then changed hands so frequently that the issue was raised in parliament. The best forestry wood had been felled during World War 2 and the estate was dissolved in 1946. Balmacaan House, near Drumnadrochit, was abandoned soon afterwards, set on fire by vandals in the 1960s and demolished in 1972.

In 1946 Bunloit Farm was separated from Balmacaan Estate and Bunloit Estate was formed round it, near the small settlement of Balbeg, on the north west shore of Loch Ness, about 4 miles south of Drumnadrochit.
