= Willie Cowie =

William Cowie, more commonly known as Willie Cowie, (born 1962) is an ex-shinty player from Portree, Isle of Skye, Scotland. Throughout his career he played for Skye Camanachd and was a prolific forward. He is now a coach for the club.

== Playing career ==
Cowie was an iconic and instrumental part of the famous Skye Camanachd Camanachd Cup winning team of 1990, scoring in the final. He also played in four Camanachd Cup semi-finals for Skye and was an instrumental in Skye's promotion to the Premier Division in 2000. Cowie was capped for Scotland at shinty/hurling but during much of his career there was no international series. He was also a national player of the year.

His father, also called Willie, played for Lovat and Skye and Cowie's son, also called William, plays at youth level for the club and made his competitive debut for Skye at Lovat in September 2010. His brother, Ross was his manager when Skye won the Camanachd Cup.

== Other sports ==
Cowie was also a football player and had a trial for St. Mirren, missing Skye's 17-0 capitulation to Kingussie the year before Skye won the Camanachd Cup. He is also a golfer.
