= London Shield =

For the Football trophy which was a predecessor to the Charity Shield, see Sheriff of London Charity Shield

The London Shield (Scottish Gaelic: Sgiath Lunnainn) is the premier trophy at Under 17 level in the sport of shinty. It takes its name from its having been donated by London Camanachd in 1989 to serve as a trophy in the national juvenile play-off. The 2012 winners were Kinlochshiel.

The current holders are Newtonmore, who claimed the 2025 Shield with a 9-2 win over holders Glenurquhart.

== Format ==
The format of the London Shield has changed over the years but at present consists of two leagues, one representing the South District, Badenoch and Fort William and the other the remainder of the North District. This has seen several all-North finals in the last few years as the top two from each league enter the semi-finals. The final is usually played at a neutral venue.

== List of Winners ==
Year	Winner	Runner-up	Score	Venue
2025	Newtonmore	Glenurquhart	8-2	The Eilan, Newtonmore
2024	Glen Urquhart	Newtonmore	4-2	Blairbeg, Drumnadrochit
2023	Glen Urquhart	Fort William		Dell, Kingussie
2022	Kinlochshiel	Inverness	2-0	Balgate, Kiltarlity
2019	Skye	Newtonmore	4-0	Pàirc nan Laoch, Portree
2018	Skye	Fort William	2-1	Blairbeg, Drumnadrochit
2017	Kingussie*	Oban Camanachd	4-4* (AET 1-0 on Pens)	Cannich
2016	Oban Camanachd	Skye Camanachd	3-2	An Eilan, Newtonmore[
2015	Newtonmore	Oban Camanachd	2-0	Cannich
2014	Kingussie			
2013	Fort William	Newtonmore	2-1	The Dell, Kingussie
2012	Kinlochshiel	Lochaber		Balgate, Kiltarlity
2011	Glenurquhart	Kinlochshiel	2-1	Balgate, Kiltarlity
2010	Lochaber	Skye Camanachd	1-1 (2-0 Pens)	Braeview Park, Beauly
2009	Skye Camanachd	Glenurquhart	2-1	Battery Park, Lochcarron
2008	Lochaber	Fort William		An Aird, Fort William
2007				
2006				
2005				
2004				
2002	Skye Camanachd	Kilmory	4-1	An Eilan Newtonmore
2001				
2000				
1999				
1998	Oban Camanachd	Fort William		
1997				
1996	Oban Celtic	Kilmallie	4-3	An Aird
1995	Kilmallie	Oban Celtic	2-0	An Aird
1994	Fort William	Oban Celtic	6-1	An Aird
1993				
1992	Oban Camanachd	Newtonmore	2-0	Oban
1991	Glenurquhart	Oban Celtic	4-3	Beauly
1990	Kingussie	Oban Celtic	4-1	Taynuilt
1989	Inveraray	Kingussie	4-1	Fort William
