= Fraser MacKenzie (journalist) =

Fraser MacKenzie is a journalist, teacher and ex-shinty player from Drumnadrochit, Scotland. He contributes shinty coverage to BBC Radio Scotland's Sports Report and to the Sunday Herald as well as commentating for Radio Scotland. He also writes the "Keeping out of the D" Blog. He played shinty for Glenurquhart Shinty Club.

Fraser and his wife Josephine have for many years now, been involved in editing and compiling newsy historical items and shared memories contributed from their community in the publication The Glenurquhart Bulletin.

He was a teacher at Inverness High School.
