= Pairc nan Laoch =

Stadium in Scotland

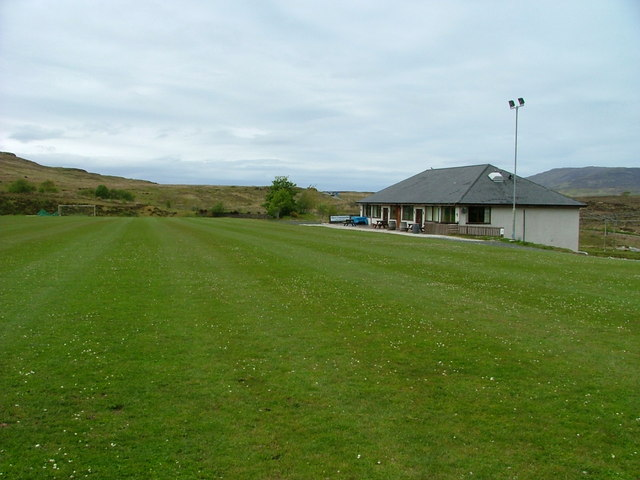
- Interactive map of Pairc nan Laoch
- Location: Portree, Skye, Highland, Scotland
- Coordinates: 57.412524°N 6.213434°W
- Owner: Skye Camanachd
- Operator: Skye Camanachd
- Capacity: 5000

Construction
- Opened: 1998

Tenant
- Skye Camanachd (North Division One) (1990s–present)

Pairc nan Laoch is a shinty stadium in Portree, Isle of Skye, Scotland. It is home to Skye Camanachd.

== History ==
Skye Camanachd originally played at Home Farm in the village of Portree and then moved to the King George V Park in the centre of the village where they attracted large crowds. They also used a park at Skeabost from time to time when the King George V was unavailable. The King George V surface was unfortunately of a poor standard and therefore from the mid-1990s, efforts were made to secure a dedicated shinty stadium in the village.

This resulted in the construction of Pairc nan Laoch (Scots Gaelic for "Field of Heroes") on land to the west of the town. Despite being created out of rocky and boggy moorland and only being played on first in 1998, the park is now considered to be one of the best in Scotland. The financial repercussions of building a large clubhouse with a bar, kitchen and gym has been a major burden to the club but in recent years steps have been taken to deal with this.

In early 2011 the pitch suffered vandalism. Although the stadium has yet to be awarded a Camanachd Cup final due to a lack of grandstand, the park has hosted the Balliemore Cup final in 2011 as well as the Balliemore and Sutherland Cup finals in 2005.

The park is used by both Skye Camanachd senior teams, the ladies team and all youth teams from U-17 to Primary Age
