= Archie Robertson (shinty player) =

Archie Robertson (born 1950 in Kiltarlity, Scotland) is an ex-shinty player and internationalist and current president of the Camanachd Association.

== Playing career ==
Robertson was born and brought up in Kiltarlity but his family connections were originally in Skye.

Robertson started his playing career with Lovat but moved to Glasgow in 1973 and started playing for Glasgow Mid Argyll in the year GMA won the Camanachd Cup. He was also capped by Scotland at Compromise rules shinty-hurling.

On retirement from the playing side of shinty, Robertson took on a management role at GMA. He also became a committee member of GMA and the Glasgow Celtic Society.

He became a co-opted member of the Camanachd Association board of directors in 2007 and capped his rise to the top of the sport's administration with his election to the post of President-elect in December 2010 and won by 21 votes to 11. He will assume the Presidency in April 2011 at the Camanachd Association A.G.M..

He may still be challenged under an obscure bye-law which allows the President-elect to be challenged on the night of the A.G.M. where he is to be confirmed. The man Robertson defeated comprehensively, Donald Stewart, did not make a bid to usurp Robertson at the 2011 A.G.M. and he was confirmed as President.
