= Ross Cowie =

Ross Cowie (born 13 February 1960) is a charity-worker and former shinty player and manager, from Portree, Isle of Skye, Scotland. He is affectionately known as The Colonel.

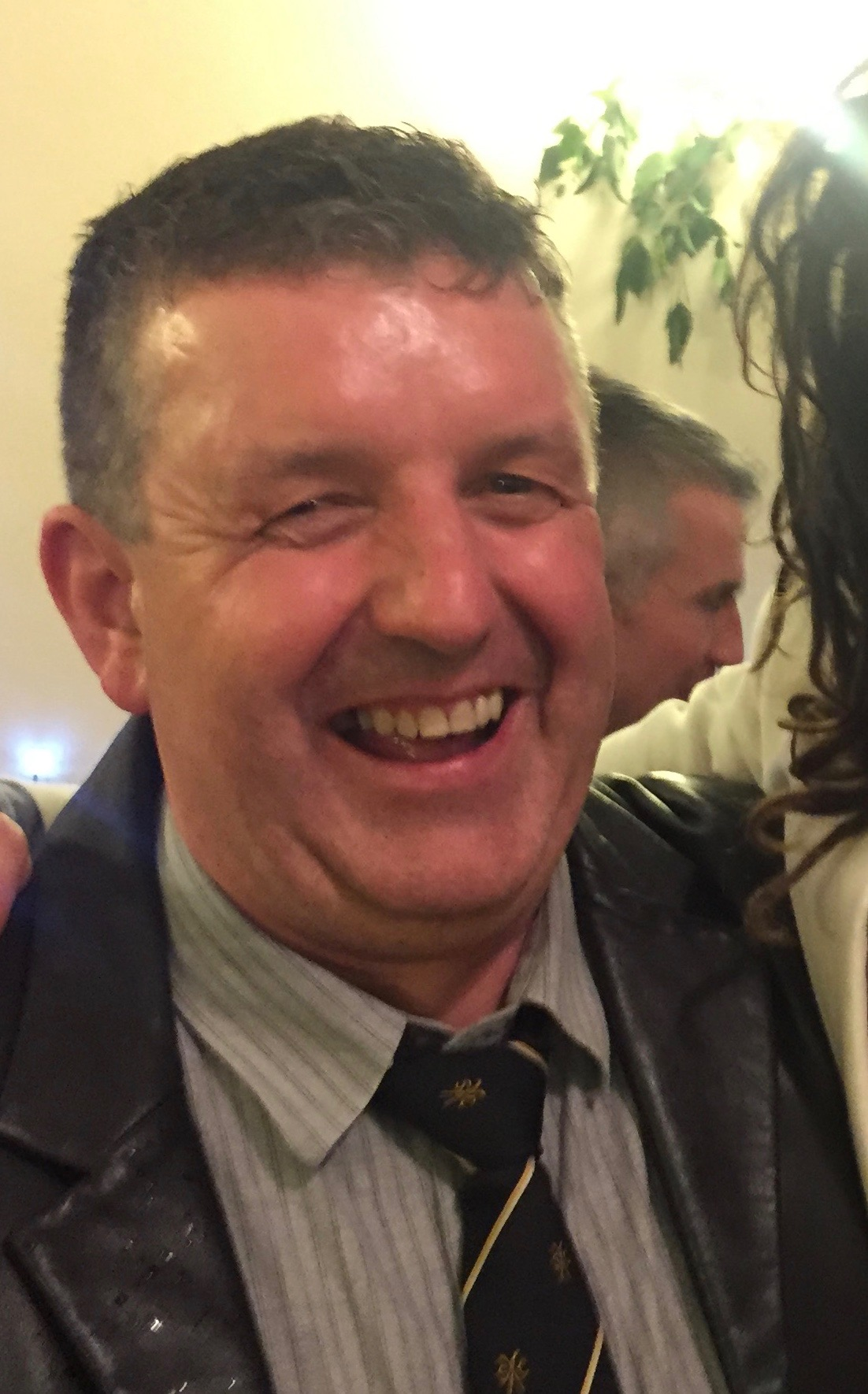
Ross Cowie in 2018

== Sporting career ==
Throughout his career, Cowie was involved with Skye Camanachd and was most notably manager when they won the Camanachd Cup in 1990 He was also captain of the Skye second team that had won the Sutherland Cup in 1988.

In all he has been manager of Skye Camanachd 3 times, covering an aggregate of 8 years. His father, Willie played for Skye Camanachd also, as well as Lovat Shinty Club. His uncle Dave Cowie played for Aberdeen FC in 1939.

Because of a serious heart condition, cardiomyopathy, Cowie retired from involvement in the playing side of the sport but retained a position as president of Skye Camanachd. In December 2010, Cowie made a dramatic return to top-level shinty with his re-appointment as assistant manager of Skye. He assisted manager Aonghas MacDonald and was supported by his two star players from the 1990 victory, his brother Willie and Albert Smith Medal winner, Willie MacRae.

He spoke to the press in January 2010 about the need for his club to improve performances at all levels, but in particular at second team level. He became the Skye Camanachd "Director of Shinty" in late 2012.

Cowie stepped down from the Skye Camanachd committee in December 2018. along with fellow club stalwart, Donnie Martin.

Cowie was also an important player and coach for the now defunct Portree United FC, a football club which shared many players in common with Skye Camanachd.

== Near-death experience and charity work ==
After a cardiac arrest in December 2006, which saw him die for several minutes, he became involved in fundraising and raising awareness of cardiac conditions throughout the Highlands of Scotland thorough his charity, Lucky2BHere. Lucky2BHere focuses on making acute care available in remote areas of the Highlands. Lucky2BHere

The trustees of Lucky2BHere are Professor Steve Leslie, Angus MacDonald, Phil Cunningham and Malcolm Jones.

By 2019, Lucky2BHere had raised over £1,000,000 and had distributed over 600 defibrillators. These defibrillators had been instrumental in saving several lives.

Through 2021, and the aftermath of the Christian Eriksen incident at Euro 2020, Cowie made a call for the Scottish Government to have emergency life support training in every school in Scotland.

In 2022, Cowie talked about Inverness BID securing 5 new defibs for Inverness City Centre and Lucky2BHere is the biggest purchaser of defibs in Scotland and Northern Ireland.

In May 2024, Cowie was recognised with a Point of Light Award and was recognised with an early day motion in the UK Parliament.
