= Archibald Thomas Robertson =

American religious leader (1863–1934)

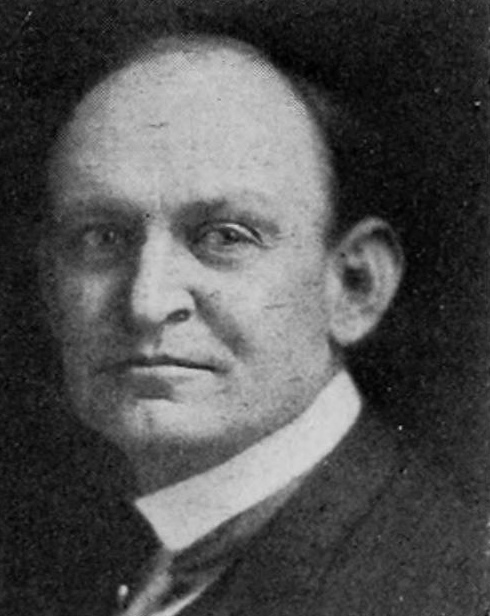
- Born: November 6, 1863; Cherbury near Chatham, Virginia, U.S.
- Died: September 24, 1934 (aged 70); Louisville, Kentucky, U.S.
- Resting place: Cave Hill Cemetery; Louisville, Kentucky, U.S.
- Occupation: theologian
- Spouse: Ella Broadus Robertson

Academic work
- School or tradition: Southern Baptist
- Institutions: Southern Baptist Theological Seminary (SBTS), Louisville, Kentucky
- Main interests: New Testament Greek
- Notable works: Word Pictures of the New Testament and A Grammar of the Greek New Testament in Light of Historical Research

Archibald Thomas Robertson (November 6, 1863 – September 24, 1934) was a Southern Baptist preacher and biblical scholar whose work focused on the New Testament and Koine Greek.

== Biography ==
Robertson was born at Cherbury near Chatham, Virginia. He was educated at Wake Forest (N. C.) College (M. A., 1885) and at the Southern Baptist Theological Seminary (SBTS), Louisville, Kentucky (Th. M., 1888), where he was thereafter instructor and professor of New Testament interpretation, and remained in that post until one day in 1934, when he dismissed his class early and went home and died of a stroke.

Robertson's books are still consulted today, particularly his Word Pictures in the New Testament and his landmark volume A Grammar of the Greek New Testament in Light of Historical Research. In all, he published 45 books, several of which are still in print today. Robertson helped found the Baptist World Alliance in 1900. He was an important Southern Baptist and a well-respected scholar in his day. Robertson sought to equip his students with the proper tools for good preaching.

He was the son-in-law of the famous preacher, John Albert Broadus — Robertson's grave lies in the shadow of Broadus' — one of the SBTS co-founders. His wife was Ella Broadus Robertson (19 April 1872 — 5 December 1945) and she wrote such books as The Ministry of Women, Worship in the Home, The Art of Motherhood, and These Things Remain. She was also the editor of The Child's Bible. They are buried next to one another in Cave Hill Cemetery in Louisville. The epitaph on his tombstone "To me, to live is Christ and to die is gain" (Philippians 1:21).

== Works ==
- Syllabus for New Testament Greek Syntax (1900)
- Life and Letters of John Albert Broadus. Philadelphia: American Baptist Publication Society. 1901.
- Bibliography of New Testament Greek (1903)
- Teaching of Jesus Concerning God the Father (1904)
- Epochs in the Life of Jesus: A Study of Development and Struggle in the Messiah's Work. New York: C. Scribner's Sons. 1907.
- Short Grammar of the Greek New Testament (1908; Italian translation, 1910; German translation, 1911; French translation, 1911; Dutch translation, 1912)
- Epochs in the Life of Paul: A Study of Development in Paul's Career. New York: C. Scribner's Sons. 1909.
- John the Loyal, or Studies in the Ministry of the Baptist (1911; new edition, 1915)
- The Glory of the Ministry (1911)
- A Grammar of the Greek New Testament in the Light of Historical Research (1914)
- Practical and Social Aspects of Christianity (1915)
- Studies in the Epistle of James (3 ed.). New York: G. H. Doran Company. 1915.
- Studies in the New Testament (1915)
- The New Citizenship (1919)
- Luke the Historian in the Light of Historical Research (1920)
- The Pharisees and Jesus: The Stone Lectures for 1915-16. New York: Charles Scribner's Sons. 1920.
- Types of Preachers in the New Testament (1922)
- The Minister and His Greek New Testament (1923)
- An Introduction to the Textual Criticism of the New Testament (1925)
- Word Pictures of the New Testament (1927)
- Some Minor Characters in the New Testament (1928)
- Paul and the Intellectuals: The Epistle to the Colossians (1928)
- A Harmony of the Gospels For Students of the Life of Christ (1922) (Revised Version, 1885, significant footnote reference to traditional readings)
- Passing on the Torch and Other Sermons (1934)
