= Badenoch & Strathspey Ladies Shinty Club =

Badenoch & Strathspey
- Full name: Badenoch & Strathspey Ladies Shinty Club
- Gaelic name: Comann Camanachd Boireannaich Bhaideanach agus Shrath Spe
- Nickname: Badenoch Ladies
- Founded: 2008
- Ground: The Eilan & The Dell
- Manager: Scott Campbell
- League: National League One
- 2018: 2nd
Home

Badenoch & Strathspey Ladies Shinty Club is a shinty club based in the area of Badenoch and Strathspey, Highland, Scotland.

The club fields one side, in the National League. They won the Valerie Fraser Trophy in 2013 in a 3-1 win against Glasgow Mid Argyle and won it again in 2018 with a 4-1 victory against Skye Camanachd Ladies.

== History ==
Badenoch is a traditionally strong area of shinty with Kingussie Camanachd and Newtonmore Camanachd Clubs being strong forces in the men's game. However, there was no permanent presence for women's shinty in the area after the shortlived Kingussie women's team folded in 2004 until the B&S was set up in 2008. The club uses both of the male team's grounds and is therefore not affiliated with one club in particular.

The club has swiftly developed and has provided internationalists to the Scottish Women's Team. The club has won a lot of trophies and plaudits in a short time. The club stepped up to the National Division in 2010 and performed admirably despite finishing fourth out of four teams.

The club dropped into the North Division Two and although they were very strong, they still required a play-off to win the division in March 2012 against Glengarry's second team. B&S had already secured promotion to the National League as Glengarry were ineligible for promotion due to their first team already playing in the league.

In the 2013 Valerie Fraser Trophy Final, against a highly fancied Glasgow Mid Argyll side, B&S upset the odds with a 3-1 victory, capped by the winning goal of Jane Nicol who had helped set up the club in the final game of her career.
