= Oban Lorn Ladies Shinty Club =

Oban Lorn
- Full name: Oban Lorn Ladies Shinty Club
- Gaelic name: Comann Camanachd Obain Latharnaich
- Nickname: Lorn
- Founded: 1999/2014
- Ground: Mossfield
- League: National Division 1
- 2014 (ND2): 2nd
Home

Oban Lorn Ladies Shinty Club, a.k.a. Oban Lorne, Lorn Ladies or Oban Ladies is a shinty team from Oban, Scotland. It is the only ladies team in the north of Argyll and its name reflects its title as representing the surrounding area of Lorn.

== History ==
Originally called Oban Camancheros, and established in 1996, Oban Lorn were one of the first Women's shinty teams in Scotland, founding members of the league and winning the Walker Cup for National Division One in 2001.

As other clubs rose to prominence, Oban fell into abeyance as the 2000s continued, with players going to play for other clubs. However, in 2013 efforts were made to focus on ladies development in Oban and this resulted in Oban Lorn entering competition in 2014.

The club came second in National Division Two, with a strong unbeaten run. This convinced the club to make the step up to National Division One in 2015.

For a short time there were two splinter clubs, Lorn Ladies and Oban Lorne, but Lorn Ladies eventually folded and now there is only one team, Oban Lorne. Oban Lorne won the first Women's Mod Cup in 2018.
