= Ardnamurchan Camanachd =

Ardnamurchan
- Full name: Ardnamurchan Camanachd
- Gaelic name: Comann Camanachd Ard nam Murchan
- Nickname: The Ard
- Founded: 2005
- Ground: Drimnatorran, Strontian, Lochaber
- Manager: Jacob Green
- League: South Division One
- 2025: 7th
Home

Ardnamurchan Camanachd is a shinty club based in Strontian, Ardnamurchan. The club covers a wide but sparsely populated area taking in Strontian, Ardgour, Morvern, Acharacle and Moidart: all in Lochaber, Highland, Scotland. It was established in 2005. It competed in Marine Harvest North Division 3 but withdrew for the 2012 season. seeking to return in 2013. However, in a radical step the club then applied to join South Division Two at a late juncture, becoming the first club ever to switch districts. The club's catchment area includes part of Morvern, which is south of the Ballachulish divide. The club returned to competitions and currently competes in South Divsion One, as well as maintaining a youth and women's presence in the sport, as well as supporting irregular friendly games by a select team in Glenfinnan.

== History ==
=== Shinty in Ardnamurchan and surrounding areas ===
Historically, shinty has been played in Morvern and the Ardnamurchan area, but this was the traditional New Year's game and there is no history of clubs in the area. Latterly Morvern played an annual game against Kilmallie. The club's colours were taken from the coats of arms of two of the main ruling clans of the area: The MacIains who were a branch of Clan Donald, and the Camerons. The colours are red, gold and black.

=== New school 2005 and early success ===
Ardnamurchan High School was built with shinty in mind, having a good shinty pitch. A team was started in October 2005. The Ardnamurchan junior team was affiliated to Kilmallie. Soon old shinty hands in the area started their own training, and it was decided to form a senior team and enter North Division 3 for the 2006 season. With limited experience and low numbers, the team struggled throughout the season.

Success came early for the U14s when the high school team reached the final of the MacPherson Cup. This team then went on to win the North of Scotland League Shield, beating Inverness in the final — despite the club being new to shinty.

In 2007 Ardnamurchan amalgamated their small primary schools to form one team at this level. The senior team was strengthened by more experienced players joining their ranks and new home grown talent emerging. The club hosted the 2007 Mod Cup on 13 September 2007 at their ground.

Stuart Carmichael stepped down as manager at the end of 2008. The club proactively sought a new manager but the club is at present managerless. Shaun Olsen took on the role of player/manager and continued with this into the 2010 season.

=== Team raising difficulties, move South, league withdrawal 2011- ===
In 2011, but also in previous years, Ardnamurchan often struggled to put together a team as many young players emigrated to Glasgow as well as the long trips to places such as Aberdeen and Ullapool. These team-raising difficulties resulted in the club taking a step back from senior level in 2012, with the intention of reapplying to North Division Three in 2013. However, the club then decided to apply to join South Division Two in January 2012.

The club was a South club for 2012. The club competed reasonably well in South Two but they did not compete in 2013 due to no manager. Again in 2014 Ardnamurchan did not compete at senior level, with many of their younger players joining the ranks of the Ballachulish 2nd team. In 2019 the senior men's team was reformed, competing in South Division One.

== Ladies team ==
Formed in 2010, for 3 years the only Ardnamurchan team competing at senior level was the Ladies branch of the club. This team, like the men's side, grew out of the efforts in Ardnamurchan High School. The Ardnalassies have developed as a team, having originally started in school competitions and then competing in the North, then National league setups. The team competed in the National League until their 2025 relegation, dropping down to the South Division,

Ardnamurchan Ladies
- Full name: Ardnamurchan Camanachd Ladies
- Gaelic name: Comann Camanachd nam Ban-muideartach
- Nickname: Ardnalassies
- Founded: 2007
- Ground: Drimnatorran, Strontian, Lochaber
- Manager: Lyndsay Bradley
- League: South Division
Home

== Honours ==
School Competitions

U14 - MacPherson Cup, runners up (2006). U14 - MacPherson Cup, third place (2007). U13 - MacBean Cup, runners up (2007). U14 - MacRae & Dick 6s, Winners (2012) U16 - Donella Crawford Cup, runners up (2011/2012) (girls competition) U16 - Wade Cup, runners up (2013) (Ardnamurchan High/Kinlochleven High)

Camanachd Association Competitions

U14 - North Division two champions (2006). U14 - Feill Chaluim Cille (shinty/hurling) third place (2007). U14 - North Division Three champions (2008) U17 - WJ Cameron Cup (Ardnamurchan/Ballchulish team) (2013)
