= Cowal and Bute (shinty) =

Shinty club based in Dunoon, Scotland

- Full name: Cowal and Bute Camanachd Club
- Gaelic name: Comann Camanachd Bhòid agus Chomhghaill
- Nickname: The Cowgirls/The Moos
- Founded: 2003
- Ground: Castle Toward, Dunoon
- Manager: Leon Braid
- League: South League
- 2008: 2
Home

Cowal and Bute Camanachd is a shinty club based in Dunoon, Argyll and Bute, Scotland. The club fields a side in the Women's League and is the only shinty team at adult level operating in Dunoon.

== History ==
The club was founded in 2003 and plays in Dunoon, there has historically not been shinty played in the town of Dunoon but the hinterland of the Cowal peninsula plays host to several illustrious clubs with male sides Kyles Athletic, Strachur and Col-Glen.

The club produced a naked calendar in 2006.

The team's catchment area includes the Isle of Bute and the Cowal peninsula.

At present there is no male team representing Dunoon in national shinty although there is a youth system in the town.
