= Skye Camanachd =

Scottish shinty team

Skye
- Full name: Skye Camanachd
- Gaelic name: Comann Camanachd an Eilein
- Nickname: Na Sgitheanaich
- Founded: 1892
- Ground: Pairc nan Laoch
- Manager: Kenny Macleod
- League: Premiership
- 2025: 5th
- Reserve Manager: Ryan Nicolson
- League: North Division One
- 2025: 3rd
Home	Away

Skye Ladies
- Full name: Skye Camanachd Ladies
- Gaelic name: Comann Camanachd an Eilein
- Nickname: Na Ban-Sgitheanaich
- Founded: 2010
- Ground: Pairc nan Laoch
- Manager: Jenna Beaton
- League: WCA Premiership
- 2025: 3rd
Home

Skye Camanachd is a shinty team from the Isle of Skye, Highland, Scotland. It plays in the Premier Division and has a reserve team in North Division One, as well as a Ladies team in the WCA National Division One and a Ladies reserve team in the WCA Development League. The club is based at Pairc nan Laoch, Portree.

== Early history ==
Skye had a strong tradition of playing shinty on the Old Celtic New Year, and there were a Portree Club and a Bernisdale Club in existence in the 1880s. However, Skye Camanachd in its present form came into being in 1892, winning the first ever MacTavish Cup. The club was a founding member of the Camanachd Association and entered the Camanachd Cup despite mainland clubs trying to force them to play on the mainland. The club had to wait almost 100 years to win the Camanachd Cup. The club endured a turbulent 1960s, and after a few years without entering competition was reformed in 1969.

== Re-establishment ==
On 2 September 1969, the club was reconstituted with Colonel Jock MacDonald as president and Duncan MacIntyre, a shinty enthusiast and local police inspector at the time, as chairman, and immediately set about fund-raising for the forthcoming season.

Instrumental in the re-establishment of the club was Donald R. MacDonald, known as "DR", who was a Scottish Gaelic teacher at Portree High School. The coaching of shinty which he started in the High School sowed the seeds of Skye's greatest success, the Camanachd Cup win of 1990. DR managed the first team in the early 2000s and his sons, Somhairle, Aonghas and Gilleasbuig, all went on to play for the club. Aonghas also managed the club between 2009 and 2010. DR died in March 2010 on the first day of that year's shinty season, and Skye's matches were cancelled that day.

Throughout the late 1970s and early 1980s, Skye Camanachd won several Sutherland Cup finals and this was to build up to their greatest triumph, the Camanachd Cup in 1990.

== Camanachd Cup 1990 ==
Skye won the Camanachd Cup for the first time in 1990 against Newtonmore in Fort William. Inspirational in this victory was player Willie Cowie and his brother, manager Ross Cowie. The BBC programme "Home", directed by Douglas Mackinnon, filmed behind the scenes on the day as well as the triumphant homecoming to Portree where they were met by a crowd of 5000 people, almost half the island's population. The expensive trophy was lost and then found in the street at 6 a.m. the next day: the local legend was that everybody thought that someone else was looking after it. In addition to winning the Cup, the Albert Smith Medal, an award presented to the Man of the Match in the final of the Camanachd Cup every year since 1972, was presented to Willie Macrae from Skye Camanachd in 1990. Skye remains the only team from an island to have won the Cup. The club toured Nova Scotia in 1991 in the afterglow of the success alongside Kingussie.Angus was

== Recent times ==
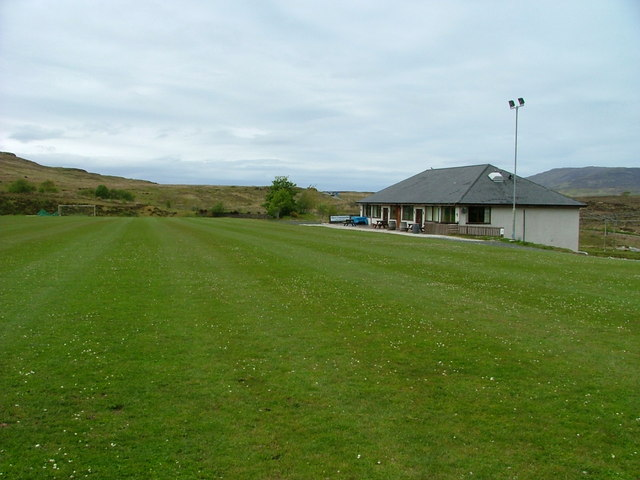
Portree Camanachd Ground and Clubhouse - geograph.org.uk - 266456

Skye have never again won the Camanachd Cup, but they achieved Premier Division status in the early 2000s under the management of Angus Murchison before being relegated. The club has shown a flair for another sort of promotion however, securing lucrative sponsorship deals with Danish firms Carlsberg and Hummel. The club also benefited in early 2008 from an anonymous loan of £50,000 from a local individual, with repayments based on future success. Much of this went to pay off some of the loan which had been invested in the development of the Pairc nan Laoch stadium after the move from the council-owned King George V Park.

In July 2008, the first team won the Balliemore Cup for the first time, defeating Kilmallie 3–1 at Braeview Park, Beauly. Gilleasbuig Macdonald was the captain. The club reappointed Angus Murchison to succeed Alasdair Morrison as manager in 2009. Aonghas MacDonald became manager halfway through the season and steered Skye to 3rd place, impressing enough to be given the full-time position in 2010. Ross Cowie, now Chairman of the club, demanded an improvement from the club's reserve side in 2010, after two poor seasons which had seen the reserve team, although historically successful, finish in the bottom half of the North Division Two and suffer humiliating defeats to lower league opposition.

In June 2009, Skye won the Plate competition of the Marine Harvest Clash of the Camans at An Aird, defeating Lochside Rovers and Fort William 2nds. The club also undertook the first ever tour of the United States by a Scottish shinty club, visiting California in September 2009.

The club had an underwhelming 2010 season. Aonghas MacDonald stepped down at the end of the season, but was reappointed to the role for the 2011 season before stepping down again at the end of the year. Davie MacVicar also stepped down as reserve manager at the end of the season, to be replaced by Murdo Morrison. Willie MacRae was appointed as the eleventh manager of Skye Camanachd in early 2012. He had a successful season at the wheel, with the club's young squad reaching second in the league. MacRae was at the helm for a disappointing season in 2013 which saw Skye miss out on the new National Division One. John 'Spod' MacLeod was appointed to the manager's role in 2014.

In July 2014, the club won the Balliemore Cup again with a hard-earned victory over Ballachulish at Taynuilt. Having twice led with goals from Johnathan “Shockie” MacLennan and Danny Morrison, the latter in extra-time, it took a Jordan Murchison goal three minutes from the end of extra time to secure the cup 3–2 for Skye. As in the 2008 triumph, Skye were captained by Gilleasbuig MacDonald. The club also won the Marine Harvest North Division 1 title in 2014 undefeated.

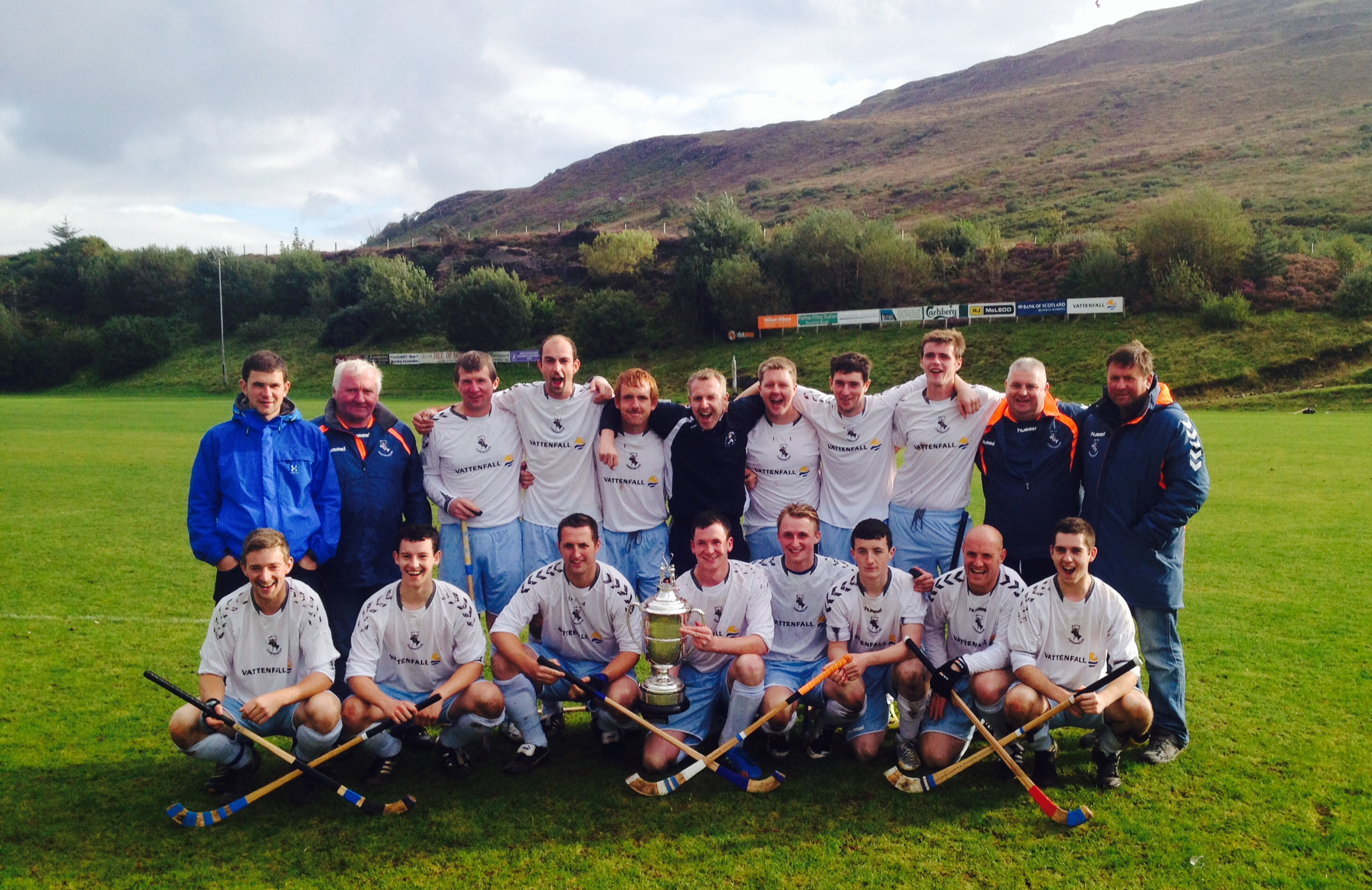
Skye Camanachd win North Division One in 2014

In 2015, Skye again went undefeated and this was enough to see them return to the Premier Division, after winning National Division One.

== Skye Camanachd Ladies ==
The club started a ladies' shinty team in 2011. Previously, players such as Sarah Corrigall would play for Glengarry, but now the opportunity for players in Skye and Lochalsh would be available. The club entered North Division Two in 2011 with Lorna MacRae winning the division's player of the year award. The team finished 3rd in 2012. They were also successful in securing the right to play home games on a Saturday. (Sunday play deemed to not be possible due to local religious sensibilities).

The team won the North Division Two in 2013 with Skye's Helen Lamond winning the league's Player of the Year award jointly with Hazel Hunter of Strathglass. The Ladies then proceeded to be runners up in both the WCA National Division One and Valerie Fraser Camanachd Cup in 2014. Sarah Corrigall was named player of the match in the cup final despite Skye going down 3-2 to Glasgow Mid Argyll. Player/manager Corrigall started the match in goals and finished in midfield. Caitlin MacLean and Lorna MacRae were the goal scorers for the Skye team captained by Rosalind Lamond.

In 2015, they finished third in the league and reached the semi-final of the Camanachd Cup. Skye has provided a number of internationalists.

Skye Camanachd Ladies enjoyed a successful 2016 season under manager Robbie Gordon and clinched their first Marine Harvest National Division One title with a 0-9 victory over Aberdour at Silversands in Fife. The new champions of Scotland have also qualified for the final of the Valerie Fraser Camanachd Cup in Fort William but were beaten 4-2 by Lochaber Ladies. Skye Camanachd Ladies also currently sit third in the new Women's Camanachd Association Development League with what it essentially their reserve team.

The Ladies lifted the Valerie Fraser Camanachd Cup for the first time in 2017 and retained their National Division One title too. The Cup was lifted after a stunning 6-1 demolition of Lochaber Ladies avenging the disappointment of the previous years defeat against the same team.

In 2018, a Third team was added playing in the Development League while the second team competed for the first time in WCA North Division Two. The Second team's first match was a 10-0 away defeat to Strathglass, but the young team bounced back in their next game beating Inverness 8-1 at Pairc nan Laoch, Portree. The First team currently lead the National Division One and will again play in the final of the Valerie Fraser Camanachd Cup.

== Youth team ==
The Skye Camanachd U17 team of 2011 won the Co-operative MacTavish Juvenile Cup after an emphatic 4-0 victory over Lochaber in a very wet Inverness. Jordan Murchison opened the scoring. In 2015 the Skye Camanachd U17 team lost the RBS MacTavish Juvenile Cup Final 2-0 to Beauly.

Skye Camanachd U17 won the 2016 RBS MacTavish Juvenile Cup at the Bught Park, Inverness on Saturday 11 June 2016 beating Fort William 2-1. Coached by Davie Pringle the goals came from captain James Pringle and Ross Gordon. Skye full centre John Gillies was awarded the Sandy MacKay Medal as man of the match, becoming the third Skye player to win the honour. The other previous Skye winners of the Sandy MacKay Medal were Ryan Morrison (2015) and Jordan Murchison (2011).

Skyes under 14s team won the McMaster Cup final on 18 September 2021.

== Honours ==
Camanachd Association Challenge Cup Winners: 1990

MacTavish Cup Winners: 1898 Runners-up: 1921, 1990, 2023

Glenmhor Cup Winners: 1980, 1981 Runners-Up: 1974

The Strathdearn Cup Winners: 1986, 2000, Runners Up: 1957, 1990, 2014, 2024

Sir William Sutherland Cup Winners: 1950, 1979, 1981, 1985, 1988, Runners-Up: 1958, 1971, 2023, 2024

Torlundy Cup Winners: 1988 Runners-up: 1989

National Mod Cup Winners: 1982, 1989, 1998, 2016, Runners-Up: 1979

Balliemore Shinty Challenge Cup Winners: 2008, 2014, 2021 Runners-Up: 1999, 2003

Marine Harvest Plate Winners: 2009

National Division Winners: 2000, 2015, 2017, 2022

North Division One (MacGillivray Senior Cup) Winners 2014 Runners-Up: 1990, 1991, 1996, 1997, 2012

MacGillivray Junior League Cup Runners-up: 1957, 1970

North Division Two (MacGillivary Junior Cup) Winners: 1982, 2015 Runners-up: 1978, 2002, 2004

North Division Three (John MacRae Cup) Winners: 1977 Runners-up: 1978, 1980, 1988, 1990

Valerie Fraser Camanachd Cup Winners: 2017, 2019, 2023 Runners Up: 2014, 2016, 2018, 2022

WCA National Division One Winners: 2016, 2017, 2018 Runners-Up: 2014, 2019, 2022

WCA North Division Two Winners: 2013

Johnstone Rose Bowl (five-a-side) Winners: 2014, 2015, 2016, 2018, 2020, 2023 Runners-up: 2017

MacTavish Juvenile Cup (U17) Winners: 1976, 1977, 1982, 1983, 1997, 1998, 2002, 2011, 2016, 2017 Runners-Up: 1973, 1974, 1985, 1986, 2001, 2005, 2012, 2015, 2023

W.J. Cameron Challenge Trophy (U17) Winners: 1973, 1974, 1977, 1980, 1982, 1983, 1997, 2002, 2005, 2006 Runners-up: 1976, 1996, 1998, 2000, 2001

London Shield (U17) Winners: 1997, 2002, 2009, 2018, 2019 Runners-Up: 1999, 2010, 2016

Strathdearn Junior Camanachd Cup (U17) Winners: 1976, 2007, 2018 Runners-up: 1973, 2017

Kenneth A MacMaster Trophy (U14) Winners: 2000, 2001, 2002, 2003, 2011, 2016, 2021, 2022, 2024 Runners-up: 1997, 1999, 2009, 2013, 2014, 2015, 2023

North Division 1 (U14) Winners: 2008, 2009, 2010, 2011, 2014, 2016, 2022 Runners-up: 2024

North Division 3 (U14) Runners-Up: 2009

Camanachd Association Cup (Primaries) Winners: 2019, 2022 Runners-up: 2021

== "Pride of the Summer" ==
Skye Camanachd are referenced in the song "Pride of the Summer" by Runrig, with a mention of the distinctive white strips that the club wears. The track is the fourth one on the band's The Cutter and the Clan album.

I still see the blood on the knees
The camans swing without warning
The lads in white
At the speed of light
It's good to be young and daring

Skye also get a mention in Fergie MacDonald's amusing ditty, "The Shinty Referee".
