= Glasgow Mid Argyll =

Scottish shinty club

- Full name: Glasgow Mid Argyll Shinty Club
- Gaelic name: Comann Camanachd Glaschu; Meadhan Earra Ghàidheal
- Nickname: GMA, Mid Argyll
- Founded: 1924
- Ground: Peterson Park, Yoker
- Manager: Nick Lavin
- League: National Division
- 2025: 3rd
- Reserve Manager: Graeme Mitchell
- League: South Division One
- 2025: 8th
Home	Away

Glasgow Mid Argyll Shinty Club (GMA) is a shinty club from Glasgow, Scotland. It is the only senior side in Glasgow and was founded in 1928. They have two men's sides and two women's sides. All GMA teams play at Peterson Park (Yoker / Garscadden).

== History ==
Glasgow has had many clubs over the years including Glasgow Cowal and Glasgow Skye whose names reflected the Highland area from which they drew their players. However, Glasgow Mid Argyll now draws its players from throughout Scotland. GMA were established in 1928 and won the Camanachd Cup for the only time in 1973.

In the late 1980s the club were based at Allan Glen's Sports Centre, Bishopbriggs.

They played in the Premier Division for one season as of 2010 due to Lochside Rovers being unable to be promoted as champions due to their senior side, Oban Camanachd, already being in the top league. Relegation was confirmed early on as the club struggled to match their northern counterparts away from home although a 1–0 win over the Drumnadrochit side at Peterson Park gave the club a much needed lift.

The club have established themselves in National Division One as dangerous opponents and finished third in 2015. The club missed out on the title in 2016 to Kilmallie, but secured promotion to the Premiership. Once in the premiership GMA struggled to get a foothold and subsequently were relegated. More recently in the 2018 season, the Mid-Argyll men had a season of ups and downs. Having eased through the knockout rounds of the Balliemore cup, they found themselves in the final, but came up against firm competition and lost out to National League 2018 champions Kilmallie. The league campaign found GMA in fourth after losing some crucial games late on in the season. However, in 2019, the GMA men found themselves in second place after a great season and only 7 goals conceded in the entirety of the league run. Along with promotion to the Premiership, GMA again found themselves in the final of the Balliemore. This time the opposition was Fort William, and Glasgow put up a brave fight. After dominating the majority of the game and being 2-1 up with 5 minutes to go, Fort William scored an offside goal that the referee did not pick up on to take the game to extra time, in which they came out victors 3-2.

2024 saw GMA lift the Balliemore Cup, with Andrew "Panda" Morrison putting in a MOTM performance after his transfer from Beauly to give Glasgow the win over Fort William at Spean Bridge.

The club has contributed several administrators to the game, including Camanachd Association presidents, Duncan Cameron,Archie Robertson. and Burton Morrison.

=== 2025 season ===
The men's first team played in the MOWI National Division in 2025, finishing third in the league and missing out on promotion in their final match of the season.

The club's involvement in the 2025 Camanachd Cup started with a 6-0 win against Aberdour at Silversands, but came to an end with a 3-0 loss to Inveraray at The Winterton.

The club reached the semi-final of the Macaulay Cup, beteating Inveraray and Kyles Athletic on the way, before losing 3-1 to Oban Camanachd at Mossfield.

First Team Goals - 2025
Player name	MOWI National Division	Balliemore Cup	Glasgow Celtic Society Challenge Cup	Camanachd Cup	Macaulay Cup	Player Total
Arran Byrne	0	0	0	1	0	1
Brian Slattery	0	0	0	0	1	1
Cailean Macleod	0	0	1	0	0	1
Calum McLay	11	4	3	2	0	20
Calum Morrison	4	0	0	1	0	5
Craig Anderson	3	0	0	0	0	3
Finlay Ralston	1	0	0	0	0	1
John Sweeney	1	0	0	0	1	2
Logan Adam	1	0	1	2	0	4
Ross Brown	11	5	0	0	2	18
Scott Craig	0	0	0	0	2	2
Total	32	9	5	6	6	58

The men's second team finished bottom of the MOWI South Division 1, winning only 2 league games in the season. The second team fared better in cup competition, winning the Bullough Cup following a 3-1 victory in the final over Lochside Rovers in Strachur.

Alan MacRae departed as manager at the end of 2025, as well as star player Calum McLay who transferred to Kingussie. The management team for 2026 was confirmed as Nick Lavin and Ross Brown.

== GMA ladies ==
The women's team won the Valerie Fraser trophy (the women's Camanachd Cup) in 2003 against Gengarry B, then again in 2006 for the 2nd time but lost out on winning the national league title to Glengarry. In 2007, they won the National first Division and Second Division, becoming the first team ever to win both leagues. They achieved this feat in terms of the Cups as well in 2015 when they won both the Valerie Fraser and the Challenge Cup on the same day. They reached the Mowi Valerie Fraser Cup final again in 2024 under the management of Graeme MacDiarmid, whilst their 2nd team won the South Division in 2025. The 2025 Shinty/Camogie international saw several GMA players receive international caps, with Ali MacVicar, Beth MacLellan and Rachel McCafferty all called up for a team managed by GMA men's player Ross Brown, and assisted by stalwarts Laura McCafferty and Katie Drain. At the Camanachd Association awards the following month, Ali MacVicar was named WCA Player of the Year.

== Youth ==
The club is affiliated with several youth teams round Glasgow, Milngavie & Bearsden (who won the Under-14 National Development Trophy in 2007 and 2009), Meadowburn Bishopbriggs, Bunsgoil Ghàidhlig Ghleann Dail, and Sgoil Ghàidhlig Ghlaschu AKA The Glasgow Gaels.
