= Lochaber Camanachd =

Scottish shinty club

Lochaber
- Full name: Lochaber Camanachd Club
- Gaelic name: Comann Camanachd Loch Abair
- Nickname: Them hoops
- Founded: 1946/1958
- Ground: Spean Bridge Stadium, Spean Bridge
- Manager: Danny Delaney
- League: National Division
- 2025: 1st
- Reserve Manager: Donnie McRae
- League: North Division Two
- 2025: 4th
Home

Lochaber Camanachd is a shinty club based in Spean Bridge, Lochaber, Scotland. The club's senior team played in the National Division while a reserve team plays in the North Division Two. Lochaber also field a women's team.

== History ==
The club was formed in 1946 from Brae Lochaber (formed in 1887) and Spean Bridge (formed in 1894). The constituent clubs then split between 1949 and 1958 before amalgamating again in 1958. These two clubs were very prominent in the first days of organised shinty. Brae won the MacTavish Cup three times in the 1920s.

The club became a strong force in shinty again in the early 2000s, knocking out Kingussie from the Camanachd Cup quarter finals in 2004 and gaining promotion to the Premier Division the same year. However, its stay was short-lived and they were relegated in 2005 to North Division One. The club made another quick return to the Premier in 2007 after winning Division One. The second team also won North Division Three in 2006. The club flirted with relegation in 2008, but survived under manager Michael Delaney. Ally Ferguson was appointed coach in December 2008.

Ferguson presided over the relegation of the club in December 2009 after the club was overhauled by both Inveraray and Bute. Lochaber's record of success in the Premier Division meant that they were considered the most likely winners of the North Division One in 2010.

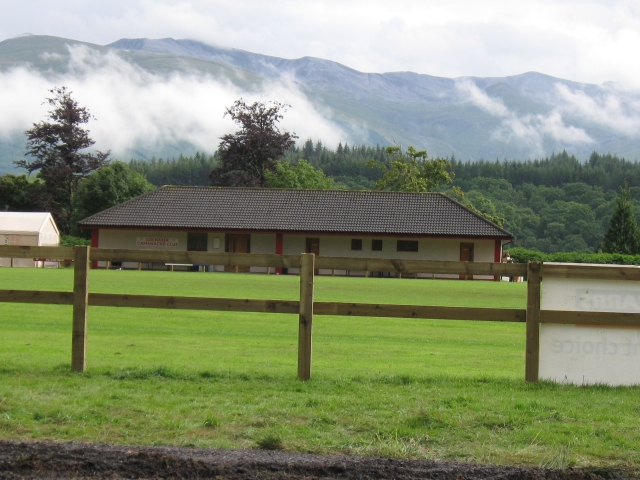

Ferguson resigned along with his assistant Jason Latto in May 2010, leaving Lochaber with a management crisis after a steady start to the season. He was replaced by Michael Delaney, his immediate predecessor, in an attempt to stop Lochaber's season turning to crisis.

Delaney's efforts ensured that Lochaber was always in the running for promotion but was pipped by Kilmallie for the league title on the last day of the season.

Lochaber started strongly in 2011 but were beaten by Kinlochshiel to the league title. However, 2012 saw them start very well in the league and achieving their first senior cup final since the 1946 merger, by reaching the MacTavish Cup Final. They made up for a loss to Newtonmore in that final by defeating Beauly in the Balliemore Cup. They also won the North Division One and provided Shaun Nicolson and Neil MacDonald to the Scotland team.

Spean Bridge regularly played host to the Marine Harvest Festival of Shinty with the showpiece game between North District and South District. This tournament has gone into abeyance since 2008.
