= Glenurquhart Shinty Club =

Shinty club in Drumnadrochit, Scotland

Glenurquhart
- Full name: Glenurqhuart Shinty Club
- Gaelic name: Comann Camanachd Ghleann Urchadain
- Nickname: The Glen
- Founded: 1885
- Ground: Blairbeg Park, Drumnadrochit
- Manager: Iain MacLeod
- League: National Division
- 2025: 7th
- League: North Division One
- 2025: 6th
Home	Away

Glenurquhart Shinty Club is a shinty team which plays in Drumnadrochit on the banks of Loch Ness, Scotland. It draws its players from the part of the Great Glen which encompasses Drumnadrochit, Lewiston and Glenurquhart. The club has been existence since 1885. They won their first senior trophy, the MacAulay Cup in 2012. After 2013 and 2014 saw them lose two successive MacTavish Cups, they are currently the holders as of 2015.

The club presently has two teams, with the first team currently playing in the National Division and the second team playing in North Division One.

== History ==
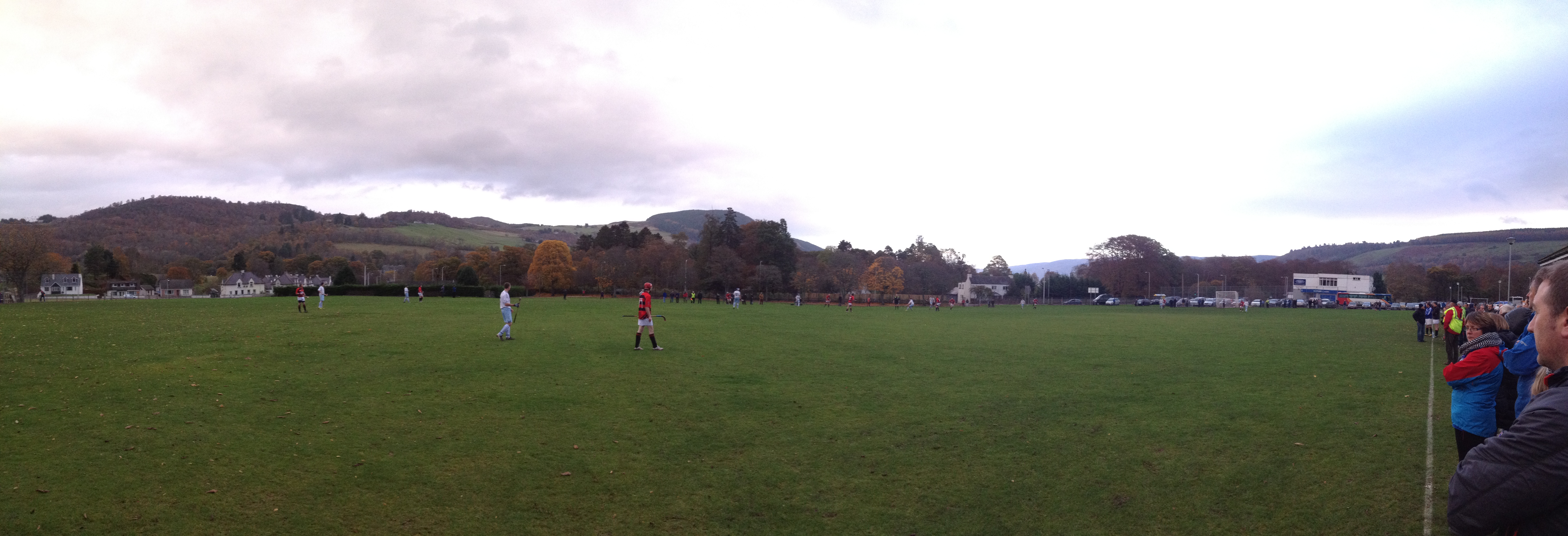
Blairbeg, home of Glenurquhart Shinty Club

Glenurquhart played a match against Strathglass on 12 February 1887 at the Bught Park, Inverness and in a landmark game concerning the establishment of the first official rules of Shinty. Glen Urquhart lost a game, played with 22 players on each side 2–0. This fixture was to be repeated on 12 January 2007 in Inverness as the opening centrepiece of the Highland 2007 celebrations in Scotland. This game was cancelled as was a replay the next year in 2008. The two teams play each other every year in a challenge match.

The club has had very poor historic success with purple patches in the 1960s and early 1990s. The club participated in the Fairytale Final of the Camanachd Cup in 1988, succumbing 4–2 to Kingussie Camanachd. The Glen were relegated from the National Premier in 1999.

In 2007, the club reached the Balliemore Cup Final but lost 1–0 to Kinlochshiel.

In 2008 the Glen have reached the Mactavish Cup Final for the first time in 26 years and won North Division One, winning promotion to the Premier Division. The second team also added to the success of the club in 2008 when it won North Division Three and was promoted to North Division Two in 2009. The club were named Marine Harvest Club of the Year for 2008 on 20 June 2009, the same day that the club won the inaugural Marine Harvest Clash of the Camans. The Glenurquhart second team won the North Division Two title on 10 October 2009, which would have seen the team promoted to North Division One in 2010 but the club committee turned this down.

Hugely successful management duo Billy MacLean and Dave Menzies stood down at the end of the 2009 season to be replaced by Jim Barr. Glenurquhart's excellent fourth-place finish for 2009 was downgraded to 5th place after Kyles Athletic won their appeal against a two-point penalty for failing to fulfil a fixture.

The club's reserves won the North Division Two in 2009 and 2010 having won the North Division Three in 2008. The club refused promotion to North Division One. The club's reserves also featured in the 2010 Sutherland Cup Final and won the Strathdearn Cup.

2011 saw the second team struggle to maintain the standards of recent years but the first team continued to consolidate its Premier Division status. Jim Barr stepped down from his management role at the end of the season to be replaced by ex-Fort William manager Drew MacNeil.

With the addition of Fraser MacKenzie, the club had a shaky start to season 2012, but picked up some fine momentum, this peaked with the Glen winning their first ever senior trophy in almost 130 years when they won the MacAulay Cup with a comprehensive 6–0 win over Oban Camanachd in August 2012.

In 2013, they reached the MacTavish Cup Final but lost on penalties to Lovat. In 2014, they again reached the MacTavish Final but lost heavily to Lovat yet again. They also reached the Camanachd Cup final but the 2014 side could only match the result of their 1988 predecessors when they lost 4–0 to Kingussie.

2015 saw the heartbreak of the MacTavish swept away with a triumphant 3–1 win over Newtonmore at the Bught Park on 13 June 2015.

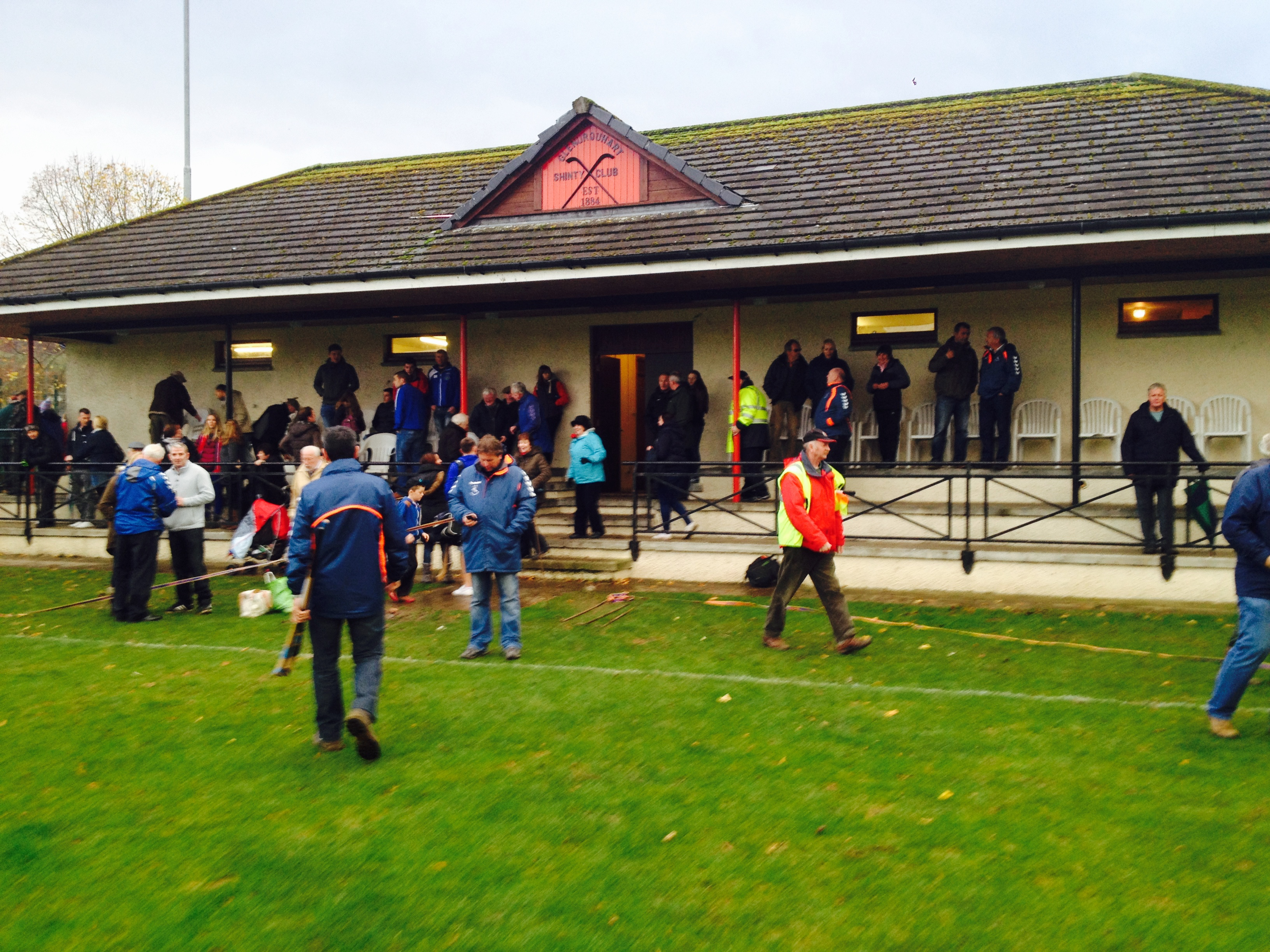
Glenurquhart Shinty Club House & Enclosure

== Players of note ==
Former Inverness Caledonian Thistle, Ross County and Motherwell goalkeeper Michael Fraser played for the club after having retired from professional football.

Midfielder Eddie Tembo was the first black person to play for Scotland at full international level, coming on as a substitute in the combined rules international with Ireland in 2008. He was joined by John Barr in 2009. Another player who has gained international recognition and holds a record number of under-21 caps is present goalkeeper, Stuart MacKintosh. Andrew Corrigan and David Smart have also been capped by Scotland in the cross code series.

January 2009 saw the death of shinty historian Professor Peter English, who was intrinsically linked with the club as a player and an official.

Shinty journalist Fraser MacKenzie played for the club and writes the Glen-based "Keeping Out Of The D" blog. The club also signed former Scotland and Lochcarron manager, Fraser MacKenzie in 2011.
