= Drumnadrochit =

Coordinates: 57.337°N 4.480°W

Drumnadrochit: Scottish Gaelic: Druim na Drochaid
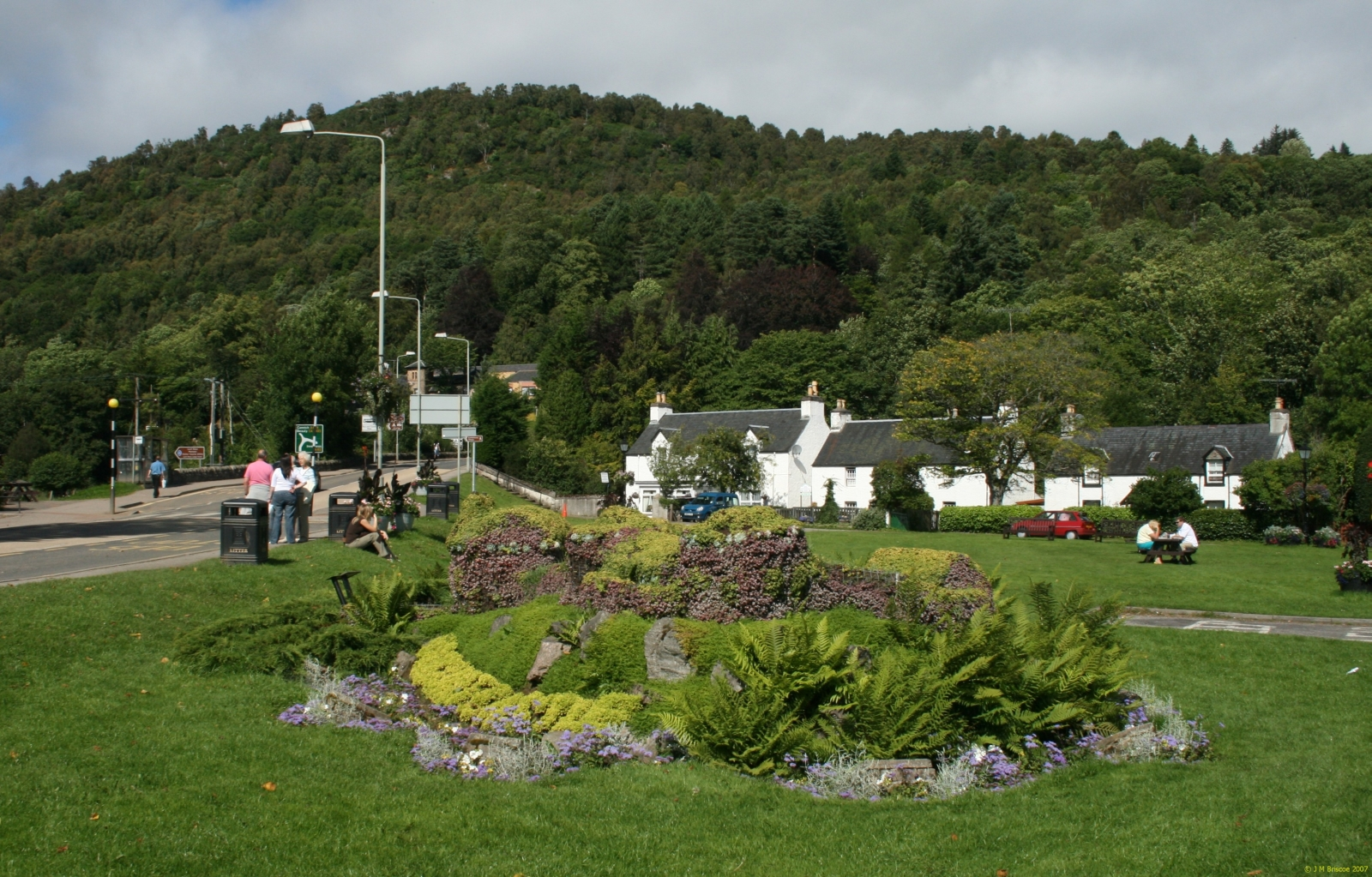
- Drumnadrochit in 2007

- Location within the Inverness area
- Population: 1,130 (2020)
- OS grid reference: NH508301
  - Edinburgh: 107 mi (172 km)
  - London: 439 mi (707 km)
- Council area: Highland
- Lieutenancy area: Inverness
- Country: Scotland
- Sovereign state: United Kingdom
- Post town: INVERNESS
- Postcode district: IV63
- Dialling code: 01456
- Police: Scotland
- Fire: Scottish
- Ambulance: Scottish
- UK Parliament: Inverness, Skye and West Ross-shire
- Scottish Parliament: Skye, Lochaber and Badenoch

Drumnadrochit (/drʌmnəˈdrɒxɪt/; Scottish Gaelic: Druim na Drochaid) is a village in the Highland local government council area of Scotland, lying near the west shore of Loch Ness at the foot of Glen Urquhart. The village is close to the villages of Milton to the west, Kilmore to the east and Lewiston to the south. The villages act as a centre for regional tourism beside Loch Ness and a local economic hub for the nearby communities.

== Geography ==
The village lies in Glen Urquhart on the A82 road to Inverness, near a junction with the A831 and beside the river Enrick. The river Enrick runs the length of Glen Urquhart, meeting the river Coltie and then flowing into Loch Ness (the eastern edge of Drumnadrochit). The nearby local hill and tourist attraction is called Craigmonie. Glen Urquhart itself adjoins Loch Ness and the larger geographical area known as the Great Glen.

== History ==
The settlement grew up around a bridge over the River Enrick, and the name Drumnadrochit derives from the Scottish Gaelic Druim na Drochaid, "the ridge of the bridge". The first stone bridge was completed between 1808 and 1811 as part of works led by Thomas Telford. The bridge was extensively damaged by flooding in 1818. It was later widened in 1933 to accommodate the expanded A82 road.

Historically the village was within the local government county of Inverness (until 1975) and the Inverness district of the Highland local government region (from 1975 to 1996).

The Drumnadrochit Hotel is a Category B listed three-storey hotel completed in 1882. Walt Disney stayed at the Drumnadrochit Hotel in early July 1949, when visiting the Highlands with his family, after visiting Edinburgh and Norton Disney in Lincolnshire.

The former Caledonian Bank building is also a prominent structure in the village and was constructed in 1895, although it is no longer a bank.

Established after the First World War, the Glen Urquhart war memorial is located in Drumnadrochit and is in the shape of a column, with a small ceremonial fenced garden.

In 2006, the village hall, originally funded by Bradley Martin of Balmacaan House, celebrated its centenary.

=== Balmacaan Estate ===
Much of Glenurquhart was historically part of the Balmacaan Estate (also known as the Glen Urquhart Estate), owned by the Grant family of Seafield between 1509 and 1946. The estate was rented to the wealthy American industrialist and local benefactor Bradley Martin in the late 19th and early 20th centuries and flourished in the 1880s and 1890s, but went into decline after the 1920s. The estate then changed hands so frequently that the issue was raised in parliament. The best forestry wood had been felled during World War 2 and the estate was dissolved in 1946. Balmacaan House, near Drumnadrochit, was abandoned soon afterwards. In 1946, Bunloit Farm was separated from Balmacaan Estate and Bunloit Estate was formed round it near the small settlement of Balbeg, located on the north west shore of Loch Ness, about 4 miles south of Drumnadrochit.

A small strip of the estate's land still exists to this day, mostly north of Balbeg that lies north of Balnain. It is largely publicly accessible and is mostly used for grazing cattle in the summer.

== Education ==
Drumnadrochit is served by the local Glen Urquhart High School which is also home to the community library.

== Culture and community ==
The village's shops include a pharmacy, a Post Office and a supermarket. There are also several restaurants and cafés. There is a doctor's surgery under NHS Scotland and a team of local Community First Responders who cover nights and weekends in serious emergencies.

The Loch Ness Hub is a community owned transport and visitor information centre.

At Urquhart Bay Harbour in Drumnadrochit there is a RNLI inshore lifeboat station. The lifeboat station was established in 2008 to respond to maritime emergencies on Loch Ness.

Balmacaan is an ancient woodland, managed by the Woodland Trust, that overlooks the village. Formerly part of Balmacaan House, the Earl of Grant's estate, the woodland estate is now open to the public.

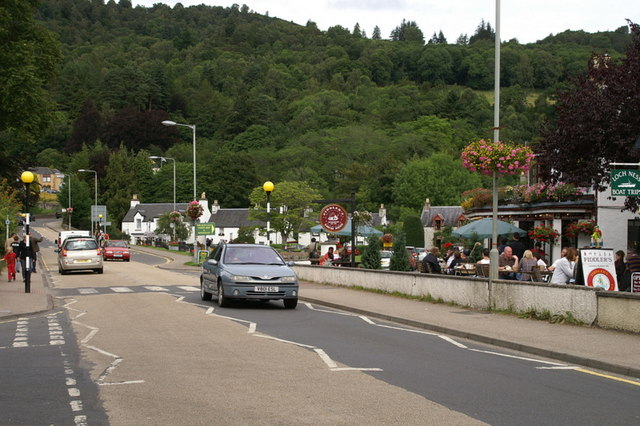
Drumnadrochit from the car park, looking north past the village green towards the bridge over the River Enrick.

== Transport ==
Several buses a day pass through Drumnadrochit, notably the 17 from Inverness bus station. Buses are less frequent outside the summer season, especially on a Sunday.

== Economy ==
The village is popular with tourists and there are three larger hotels in (or close to) the village, two smaller inns (the Ben Leva Hotel and Fiddler's Rest) and a hostel (the Loch Ness Backpackers Lodge). Attractions include the nearby Urquhart Castle, one of the most visited sites managed by Historic Scotland, and Nessieland, and a "Nessie" themed exhibition about the Loch Ness Monster, the Loch Ness Centre and Exhibition for those wanting a more serious interpretation. The village hosts the Glenurquhart Highland Games at the end of August each year. A winter event, "Drums and Rockets", has also taken place in recent years. The community hosts a Bonfire Night fireworks display around 5 November.

Two long-distance hiking routes pass through or start at the village. The Great Glen Way from Fort William to Inverness; and the Affric-Kintail Way begins at the village, passing through Glen Affric and ending at Morvich on the west coast.

Agriculture and forestry are also major local employers. Drumnadrochit is the home of the Hanging Tree Brewery, a microbrewery launched in 2018. Drumnadrochit is also home to Cobbs Cakes traditionally made and distributed across the UK and Ireland. Cobbs is also the largest employer in the village, running the Drumnadrochit Hotel and the Clansman Visitor Centre, and recently bought the Loch Ness Beer brand after the brewery went into administration in 2016.

== Sports ==
The village is home to shinty team Glenurquhart Shinty Club. Also, there is a Bowls Club and Badminton.

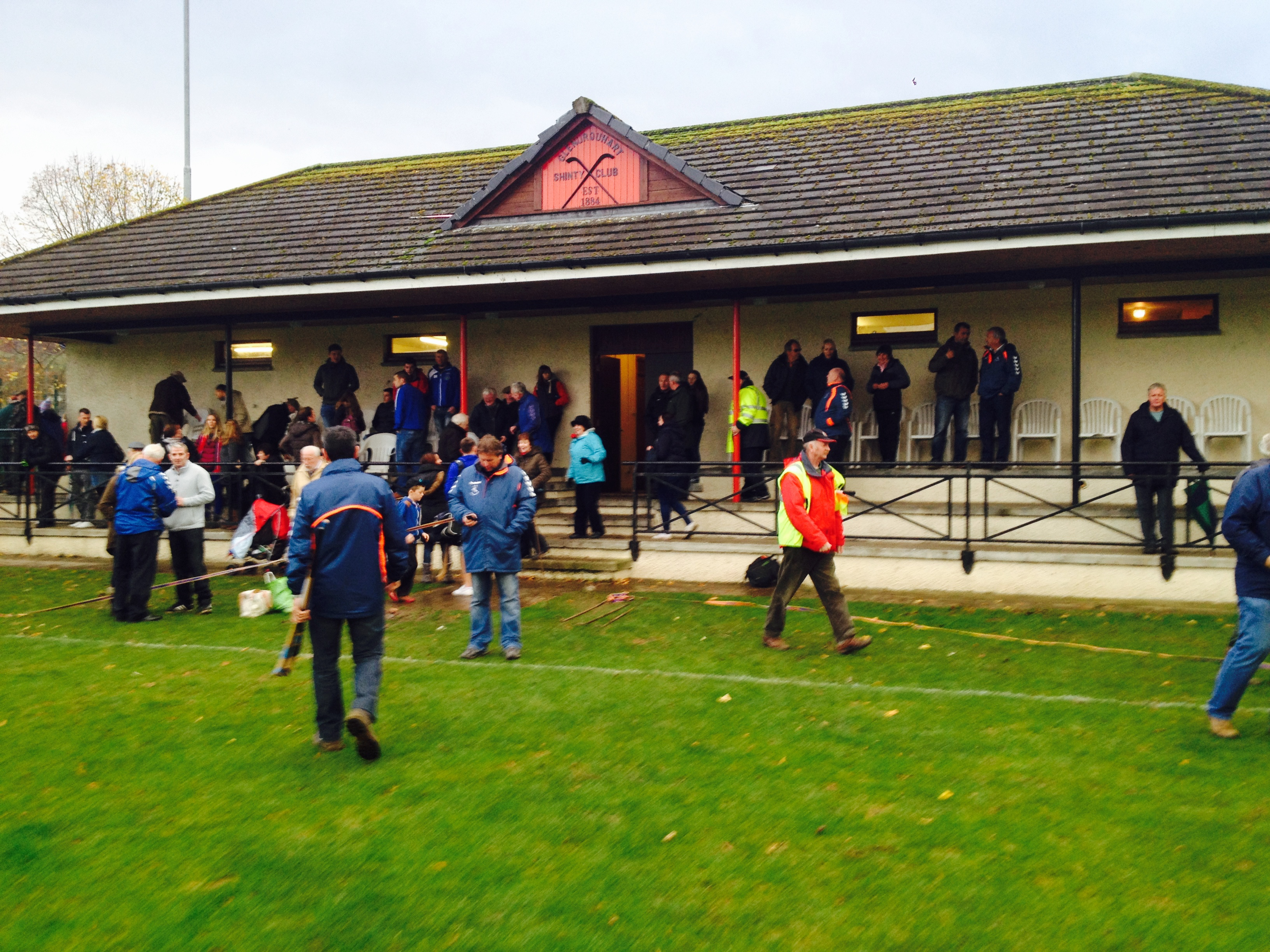
Glenurquhart Shinty Club House & Enclosure

== In popular culture ==
Drumnadrochit is featured in the film Scooby-Doo! and the Loch Ness Monster as the closest town to Blake Castle, the home of Daphne Blake's Scottish ancestors. When the main characters are first driving into the town, Fred Jones has trouble pronouncing the town's name while Scooby-Doo pronounces it just fine.

In Lawrence Block's novel The Burglar in the Library, there is a fictional scotch enjoyed by Bernie called Glen Drumnadrochit.

In The Family Ness theme song, You'll Never Find A Nessie In The Zoo, the refrain states "You can go to Auchtermuchty and to Drumnadrochit too, but you'll never find a Nessie in the zoo".

== See also ==
- Balnain
