= Bullough Cup =

The Bullough Cup is a knock-out competition in the sport of shinty.

It is played for by reserve-level teams from the South District of Shinty, which includes all of Scotland South of Ballachulish as well as England. All teams playing in South Division Two, Kyles Athletic Seconds, Lochside Rovers, Inveraray Second Team, Glasgow Mid-Argyll Second Team, as well as non-league teams such as London Camanachd are eligible. Lochside Rovers are the current holders, having won it in 2024.

== History ==
The trophy was presented by Sir George Bullough, Victorian playboy and raconteur, who owned the hunting estate on the island of Rùm. The trophy was first played for in 1906 with an abeyance for the Great War. Its early years saw the competition dominated by teams from North Argyll, then Oban. With the amalgamation of the Dunn and Southern Leagues, the trophy become more open. The trophy has had two significant periods of abeyance, one in the lead up to the Second World War, and the other in the mid-Sixties. There was also a shorter period in the 1990s.

Lochside Rovers were champions in 2009 defeating Kyles Athletic in a rearranged final in Tighnabruaich after the original final was called off.

The Bullough Cup has seen several interesting developments in recent years, in 2005 it was run as a league cup, which marked the re-entry of Col-Glen and London to competition as well as the first senior fixtures of Aberdour Shinty Club. It has also seen the first Camanachd Association fixture in England for 80 years and the victory by the Highlanders in 2006.

As of 2010, the opening rounds of the cup will be played midweek, in order to reduce the backlog of fixtures that has regularly afflicted shinty.

Glasgow Mid-Argyll won the 2010 cup defeating Kyles Athletic 3–1, and again in 2022 winning 2–0 against Kilmory.

In 2014, the Bullough Plate was created for first round losers to compete for and this was won by Glenorchy. The Bullough Plate was discontinued in 2015.

== Winners ==
- 2025 Glasgow Mid Argyll 3, Lochside Rovers 1
- 2024 Bute 0, Lochside Rovers 2
- 2023 Kyles Athletic 3, Glasgow Mid-Argyll 2
- 2022 Glasgow Mid-Argyll 2, Kilmory 0
- 2020/2021 No competition due to COVID-19
- 2019 Lochside Rovers 4, Glasgow Mid-Argyll 1
- 2018 Kyles Athletic 2, Lochside Rovers 5
- 2017 Inveraray 3, Strachur 2
- 2016 Tayforth 4, Kilmory 3
- 2015 Tayforth 4, Kyles Athletic 2
- 2014 Kyles Athletic 6, Inveraray 3 (Bullough Plate Winners: Glenorchy)
- 2013 Ballachulish 3, Kyles Athletic 0
- 2012 Lochside Rovers 6, Ballachulish 2
- 2011 Lochside Rovers 5, Aberdour 0
- 2010 Glasgow Mid-Argyll 3, Kyles Athletic 1
- 2009 Lochside Rovers 6, Kyles Athletic 4 (A.E.T.)
- 2008 Lochside Rovers 4, Oban Celtic 1
- 2007 Inveraray
- 2006 The Highlanders
- 2005 Lochside Rovers
- 2004 Kyles Athletic 4, Glasgow Mid-Argyll 1
- 2003 Inveraray
- 2002 Lochside Rovers
- 2001 Lochside Rovers
- 2000 No competition
- 1999 Lochside Rovers
- 1998 No competition
- 1997 No competition
- 1996 No competition
- 1995 Bute
- 1994 Strachur 8, Tayforth 1
- 1993 Ballachulish
- 1992 Kilmory
- 1991 Ballachulish 3, Tayforth 1 (A.E.T.)
- 1990 Inveraray
- 1989 Lochside Rovers
- 1988 Glenorchy
- 1987 Kyles Athletic
- 1986 Glenorchy
- 1985 Glenorchy
- 1984 Glenorchy
- 1983 Col-Glen
- 1982 No competition
- 1981 Ballachulish
- 1980 Ballachulish
- 1979 Kilmory
- 1978 Strachur
- 1977 Strachur
- 1976 Glenorchy
- 1975 Oban Celtic
- 1974 Oban Celtic
- 1973 Glenorchy
- 1972 Lochside Rovers
- 1971 Lochside Rovers
- 1970 Oban Celtic
- 1969 Oban Celtic
- 1968 Ballachulish
- 1967 No competition
- 1966 No competition
- 1965 No competition
- 1964 No competition
- 1963 Oban Celtic
- 1962 Inveraray
- 1961 Inveraray
- 1960 Lochside Rovers
- 1959 Inveraray
- 1958 Inveraray
- 1957 Lochside Rovers
- 1956 Lochside Rovers
- 1955 Strachur
- 1954 Appin
- 1953 Appin
- 1952 Appin
- 1951 Dunstaffnage
- 1950 Appin
- 1949 Oban Celtic
- 1935–1948 No Competition
- 1934 Lochside Rovers
- 1933 Lochside Rovers
- 1932 Lochside Rovers
- 1931 Oban Celtic
- 1930 Oban Celtic
- 1929 Oban Celtic
- 1928 Oban Celtic
- 1927 Lochside Rovers
- 1926 Lochside Rovers
- 1925 Lochside Rovers
- 1924 Ballachulish
- 1923 Lochside Rovers
- 1922 Duror Juniors
- 1921 Oban Camanachd Juniors
- 1920 Ballachulish
- 1914 Glencoe, after a replay with Appin
- 1913 Oban Camanachd Juniors
- 1912 Oban Camanachd Juniors
- 1911 Inveraray
- 1910 Inveraray
- 1909 Kelburn, Oban
- 1908 Ballachulish
- 1907 Ballachulish
- 1906 Ballachulish

Wins By Clubs

Club	Total	Years
Lochside Rovers	24	1912, 1913, 1921, 1923, 1925, 1926, 1927, 1932, 1933, 1934, 1956, 1957, 1960, 1971, 1972, 1989, 1999, 2001, 2002, 2005, 2008, 2009, 2011, 2012
Ballachulish	11	1906, 1907, 1908, 1920, 1924, 1968, 1980, 1981, 1991, 1993, 2013
Inveraray	10	1910, 1911, 1958, 1959, 1961, 1962, 1990, 2003, 2007, 2017
Oban Celtic	10	1928, 1929, 1930, 1931, 1949, 1963, 1969, 1970, 1974, 1975
Glenorchy	6	1973, 1976, 1984, 1985, 1986, 1988
Appin	4	1950, 1952, 1953, 1954
Strachur	4	1955, 1977, 1978, 1994
Kyles Athletic	3	1987, 2004, 2014, 2023
Glasgow Mid-Argyll	2	2010, 2022
Kilmory	2	1979, 1992
Tayforth	2	2015, 2016
The Highlanders	1	2006
Bute	1	1995
Col-Glen	1	1983
Dunstaffnage	1	1951
Duror	1	1922
Glencoe	1	1914
Kelburn	1	1909
