= Forth Camanachd =

Forth
- Full name: Forth Camanachd Club
- Gaelic name: Comann Camanachd Foirthe
- Founded: 2006
- Ground: Levenhall Links, Musselburgh
- League: defunct
Home

Forth Camanachd was a women's shinty club based in Musselburgh, East Lothian, Scotland. The club was established in 2006 and won both the Valerie Fraser Cup (the female equivalent of the Camanachd Cup) and the Caledonian Canal Challenge Cup in its time in existence.

The club has now merged with Aberdour Shinty Club as of the 2011 season.

== History ==
The club grew out of the successful the University of Edinburgh sides of the early 2000s and was founded in 2006. The club did not have long to wait to garner serious success and won the Valerie Fraser Camanachd Cup, (the female equivalent of the Camanachd Cup) in 2007. In 2010 the club voluntarily moved into South Division 2 from National Division 1 in order to develop new players. This move resulted in a successful season for the club, winning the Caledonian Canal Challenge Cup and a second-place finish in the league.

Forth also fielded a camogie and regularly play friendly matches against Tír Conaill Harps and compete in 7-a-side tournaments. They won Tara Camogie 7s tournament in 2008.

The team's catchment area included Fife and Tayside as well, although there is also a women's team in Linlithgow.

Forth's merger with Aberdour in 2011, along with the collapse of Edinburgh East Lothian in 2007 means that the only team actually playing shinty in Edinburgh at adult level is Edinburgh University. Forth played at Edinburgh East Lothian's old ground in Musselburgh.

The club should not be confused with Tayforth Camanachd, the men's team that plays its games in Perth.
