= Shinty in the United States =

The logo of US Camanachd

Shinty was played in its original form throughout North and South America by Scottish settlers until the early 1900s when the practice died out. Shinty, and its close Irish relative hurling as well as the English bandy, are recognised as being the progenitors of ice hockey and are an important part of North America's modern sporting heritage.

Despite this tradition, shinty itself went unplayed for almost 100 years at any serious level until the mid-1980s when Scottish Americans once again took an interest in the sport, with the first club being established in northern California. Since 2000, a concerted initiative, with support from the Camanachd Association in Scotland, has seen a revival of the sport. There is now a US Camanachd Association and Cup and clubs are also making the trip to Scotland to play tours. The Camanachd Cup itself made the long trip to New York City for the Tartan Day celebrations.

Steps are afoot to open franchises in Oregon, Utah, Alabama, Louisiana and Arizona. The Oregon Franchise opened in 2010. The first ever All-American competition was held in September 2010 with Northern California, Washington and Oregon meeting at the Kelso Highlander Festival.

It is a significant step for the sport of shinty to spread to new markets such as the United States and Canada which have large Scottish Gaelic communities.

The first international games with a Scottish club on US soil were played in September 2009 against Skye Camanachd.

== US Camanachd Association ==
US Camanachd operates as a body for fostering and assisting the spread of shinty within North America. It is operated by Northern California Camanachd. It is not the governing body of the sport in the US and Canada as it does not prescribe rules or govern competitions, instead recommending the rules of the Camanachd Association as used in Scotland.

== International side ==
US Camanachd co-ordinates the international representative team for the United States. The United States played England in the first ever shinty international between in May 2013. England won the fixture 2–0 on neutral ground in St. Andrew's.

== Clubs ==
=== Northern California Camanachd Club ===
Northern California Camanachd Club AKA NCCC is a shinty team based in the San Francisco Bay Area. It was the first shinty club of the modern era in North America being founded in 2001 and has been instrumental in the spread of the sport across the United States.

Set up by Americans with Scottish heritage, including Michael Bentley, who trained with Skye Camanachd in 1983, Elheran Francis and Karl Davis. The NCCC officially came into being in 2001 as a means of fostering and developing an authentic Scottish sporting activity in northern California.

They contested the first US Shinty cup, the Glenfarclas Cup, in 2004 with San Luis Obispo Shinty Club and played against their (now-defunct) state rivals several times. The NCCC hosts the Campbell Quaich (see Quaich).

In 2005, the club made its first tour of Scotland, playing Tayforth Camanachd, Edinburgh East Lothian and Aberdour Shinty Club. They repeated this trip in 2006.

Whilst also being the founders of US Camanachd, the club's players have also spread the game as ambassadors to other parts of the United States and there are, as of December 2010, 4 other clubs in the USA.

The Northern California Camanachd Club also has Regional Challenge matches during the off Highland Games season, both clubs train year round. On 4 September 2005 the first international Shinty match between a team from USA and a team from Scotland on Scottish soil was played. The event was hosted by the Blairgowrie Highland Games where the Northern California Camanachd Club (NCCC) played a series matches against Tayforth. The Cup for the match series was provided by the Pleasanton Blairgowrie Fergus Sister City Organization and the "Player of the Match" award was provided by the Campbell Highland Games Association. The hosts Tayforth took home the cup, which they retained in 2006.

Northern California Camanachd Club also participated in the first Annual Edinburgh East Lothian Levenhall Six a Side Shinty Tournament in Musselburgh on 5 September 2005, other teams were Edinburgh East Lothian, Aberdour Shinty Club and Edinburgh University Women's team. Edinburgh East Lothian won the tournament with NCCC coming in 3rd out of 4 teams.

In June 2006 Gary Innes, Captain of Fort William Shinty Club and Man of the Match for the 2005 Camanachd Cup visited to California to play Shinty and to teach at a workshop hosted by the Northern California Camanachd Club open to all US Shinty Clubs. Gary Innes returned in June 2007 to teach another workshop open to all clubs and individuals. This workshop helped developing clubs as well as beginning level players.

The club played its first twelve a-side fixture in Scotland against Skye Camanachd on 6 September 2007, they were defeated 9–0.

The spring of 2008 marked the inaugural season of the Northern California Camanachd League Fixtures. The club was divided into three geographical regions: South Bay AKA Bayside Bears, North Bay AKA North Bay Rovers, and San Mateo AKA San Mateo Hooligans. Each team played each other twice in a six-game season.

The club also brought shinty to the Scottish Highland Gathering and Games in Pleasanton, California in 2008. In 2009, they returned to Pleasanton, where they also hosted Skye Camanachd in the first ever international match on US soil.

In September 2010 Northern California Camanachd traveled north to play Washington Camanachd and the Oregon Shinty Club at the Kelso Highlander Festival in Kelso, Washington. This is the first time that three US shinty clubs have met and played one another, and most likely the first time in history that three non-Scottish shinty clubs have ever met. NCC won 5–1 against Oregon and 3–0 against Washington. Further US shinty tournaments are being planned.

==== The MacRae Shield ====
The MacRae Shield is the trophy awarded to the Winner of the Norcal League. It was first presented in 2010 and was inscribed with the names of the three previous winners. It is named after John MacRae, former Skye Camanachd player, who donated the presentation camans upon it.

=== Central California Camanachd ===
Formerly the Washington Camanachd franchise, this has been in existence for over four years, playing against the Northern California Camanachd club and was represented on the US International side that traveled to Scotland to compete in the 2014 St Andrews Sixes Tournament.

=== Oregon Camanachd ===
As of 2010, a shinty franchise has started in Portland, Oregon. Oregon competed against NCCC and Washington at the Kelso Highland Games in September 2010.

=== New England Camanachd ===
A new club to begin in 2011, this franchise was started by an ex-Washington player who moved to Boston, this is now the second active club on the East Coast after the North Carolina Clubs.

== Defunct Clubs ==
=== Morro Bay Shinty Club ===
Morro Bay Shinty Club was the second shinty club in the modern era of shinty in North America. The club was founded as San Luis Obispo Shinty Club in 2004, adopting the wider scope of Morro Bay to increase the club's catchment area in 2006.

The club founded the Glenfarclas Cup, the first intra-club US based Shinty cup, played at present between Morro Bay and Northern California Camanachd Club in 2004 and 2005. The Cup is sponsored by Glenfarclas, who also sponsor Morro Bay. The club planned to tour Scotland in 2007 but as of 4 April 2007 the club is no longer active, please contact the Northern California Camanachd Club for information on shinty in Central or Southern California.

=== North Carolina Shinty Association ===
The North Carolina Shinty Association (NCSA) became the newest East Coast shinty group in the fall of 2010. The group mission is to expand knowledge/interest in the game of shinty into all of North Carolina and provide shinty competition to the citizens of this state. The NCSA 2011 season is starting in March. Two clubs are currently playing in the Premier league, the Fuquay Varina Tigers and the Erwin Wolves.

==== Clubs of the NCSA ====
Fuquay Varina Camananachd Club

The Fuquay-Varina Camanachd Club (FVCC) was formed in September 2010 and was located in the southern part of Wake County, North Carolina in the shadow of Raleigh. The club was founded by Timothy Rogers, an American with Scottish roots. The team is a part of the North Carolina Shinty Association. Its mascot was a tiger and its colors were orange/black.

Erwin Shinty Club

The Erwin Shinty Club (ESC) was formed in October 2010 and was located in the eastern part of Harnett County. The club was founded by Daniel Abbey, an American with English roots. The team was a part of the North Carolina Shinty Association. Its mascot was a wolf and its colors were red, black and white. The Erwin Shinty Club was an offshoot club from the FVCC formed to create true shinty competition in North Carolina. The teams shared a practice field.

=== Houston Camanachd ===
Houston Camanachd Club was the third shinty team to be established in North America in the modern era in 2005.

The club was founded by Warren Clifford, a shinty player from the NCCC. The developmental aim of the club was to compete against the other shinty teams in North America. However, their extreme distance from any other club, the rest of the clubs being on the Western Seaboard, meant that Houston did not develop into a fully blown club and as of 2010 can be considered to be inactive.

=== Dunedin Camanachd ===
Dunedin Camanachd was founded in the Spring of 2006 by an Ex-Pat Scot, being the First East Coast club in a century. Located in Dunedin, Florida, Dunedin Camanachd drew their co-ed player base throughout the Tampa Bay area. The club was affiliated to Lewis Camanachd in Scotland and received a donation of equipment from the fledgling club.

The management relocated to Washington State which led to Dunedin folding.

== Colours ==
- NCCC – International: Blue, Gold, Grey.

Domestic Teams of the NCCC: Bay Side Bears: Blue, Gold White, North Bay Rovers: Green and Black, San Mateo Hooligans: Maroon and White

- Washington – Blue
- Oregon – Green
- North Carolina Shinty Association (NCSA) – Red

Domestic Teams of the NCSA: Fuquay-Varina Tigers: Orange and Black, Erwin Wolves: Red and Black

Defunct clubs

- Morro Bay – Red and White Stripes
- Houston – Black and Gold
- Dunedin – Blue and Green
