= South Division Two (shinty) =

Shinty league

Marine Harvest South Division Two
- Country: Scotland
- Confederation: Camanachd Association
- Number of clubs: 7
- Level on pyramid: 4
- Promotion to: South Division One
- Current champions: Kyles Athletic 2nd (2025)
- Website: www.shinty.com

The South Division Two, currently known as the Mowi South Division 2 for sponsorship reasons, is the fourth tier of the men's shinty league system. The Champions are promoted to the South Division One.

== Current teams ==
The 2025 South Division 2 consisted of the following teams:

* Denotes Reserve team

- Aberdour Shinty Club 2nd*
- Bute Shinty Club 2nd*
- Kyles Athletic 2nd*
- Stirling Camanachd Club
- Strachur-Dunoon Shinty Club
- Tayforth Camanachd
- Uddingston Shinty Club

== List of winners since 2014 ==
- 2014 – Inveraray Shinty Club 2nd
- 2015 – Col-Glen Shinty Club
- 2016 – Tayforth Camanachd
- 2017 – Inveraray Shinty Club 2nd
- 2018 – Strachur and District Shinty Club
- 2019 – Kilmory Camanachd
- 2020 – No season due to the COVID-19 pandemic
- 2021 – Regional league system (Note: A system of regional leagues replaced all Shinty leagues during 2021 in order to reduce distances teams travelled due to the COVID-19 pandemic. Premiership clubs were placed in one of three senior leagues of six teams each.)
- 2022 – Bute Shinty Club
- 2023 – Kilmory Camanachd
- 2024 – Inveraray 2nd
- 2025 – Kyles Athletic 2nd*
