= Lisa Norman =

Lisa Norman MacColl (née Norman) (born 1979) is a shinty player and manager from Kincardine, Fife, Scotland. She is a Scottish International but is most renowned for having founded and developed Aberdour Shinty Club in 2001.

== Biography ==
Lisa was born and brought up in Fife but a summer spent in Tighnabruaich sailing introduced her to shinty, which she then played at University level and for Glasgow Mid-Argyll.

As part of her University sports degree, she was required to introduce a new sport to an area. She chose to introduce shinty in Aberdour Primary School, shinty having been moribund in Fife (apart from at the University of St Andrews and a short lived team in Dunfermline in the early 1990s) for a few hundred years.

This short six-week trial developed into the modern Aberdour Shinty Club with teams at all age levels and in the women's game as well.

Her achievement has been acknowledged by several awards as well as several media appearances, most prominently in the "Caman" documentary series on BBC Alba.

Norman-MacColl plays shinty for Aberdour in the men's leagues but also plays women's shinty for Glasgow Mid-Argyll. She also manages the Aberdour first team.

As shinty is an amateur sport, Norman-MacColl is employed as a sports development officer by Fife Council.
