= List of listed buildings in Aberdour, Fife =

This is a list of listed buildings in the parish of Aberdour in Fife, Scotland.

== List ==
Name	Location	Date listed	Grid ref. (Note: Sometimes known as OSGB36, the grid reference (where provided) is based on the British national grid reference system used by the Ordnance Survey. • "Guide to National Grid". Ordnance Survey. • "Get-a-map". Ordnance Survey.)	Geo-coordinates	Notes	LB number (Note: Historic Environment Scotland assign a unique alphanumeric identifier to each designated site in Scotland, for listed buildings this always begins with "LB", for example "LB12345".)	Image
Aberdour, 1, 2, 3, 4 Kirk Cottages, High Street				56°03′10″N 3°18′21″W	Category B	3590	Upload another image
The Murrell Including Ancillary Buildings, Garden Terraces, Walled Raised And Water Gardens And Rockery				56°03′58″N 3°18′23″W	Category A	3598	Upload Photo
Cullaloe Lodge				56°04′22″N 3°18′34″W	Category B	3603	Upload Photo
Aberdour, Mclauchlan Rise, St Colme House Dovecot				56°03′07″N 3°18′32″W	Category B	3607	Upload another image
Aberdour, 8 Livingston Lane				56°03′13″N 3°18′01″W	Category C(S)	3612	Upload another image
Cullaloe Temple				56°04′44″N 3°19′12″W	Category B	3572	Upload another image
Aberdour, 4 Sands Place, High Street				56°03′10″N 3°18′21″W	Category C(S)	49682	Upload another image
Bouprie Banks Farm Steading				56°03′32″N 3°19′26″W	Category B	49685	Upload Photo
Aberdour, 5 Sands Place, High Street				56°03′10″N 3°18′21″W	Category C(S)	3592	Upload another image
Aberdour, 6 Sands Place, High Street, Countess Of Moray				56°03′09″N 3°18′23″W	Category B	3593	Upload another image
Balmule Dovecot				56°04′46″N 3°16′55″W	Category B	3599	Upload Photo
Aberdour, 28 High Street, Church Hall Including Graveyard And Boundary Wall				56°03′14″N 3°18′08″W	Category B	3615	Upload Photo
Aberdour, 45, 47 Main Street, Wellside				56°03′25″N 3°17′47″W	Category C(S)	3635	Upload Photo
Aberdour, Aberdour House				56°03′16″N 3°17′59″W	Category A	3636	Upload Photo
Aberdour, 2 Station Place, Rose Cottage, Including Iron Railings, 4 Station Place, Melville Cottage				56°03′16″N 3°18′05″W	Category C(S)	3641	Upload another image
Aberdour, 7, 9, 11 Manse Street				56°03′05″N 3°18′00″W	Category B	3562	Upload Photo
Aberdour, Inverkeithing Road, St Columba's Church (Episcopal Church)				56°03′08″N 3°18′29″W	Category C(S)	49678	Upload another image
Aberdour, 1 Seaside Place, Seaside House Including Iron Railings				56°03′05″N 3°17′55″W	Category B	49683	Upload Photo
Aberdour, 27, 29, 31, 33 High Street With Boundary Walls, Bee Boles, Well And Trough In Courtyard To Rear				56°03′13″N 3°18′06″W	Category B	3587	Upload another image
Aberdour, 18 Manse Street, The Manse				56°03′10″N 3°18′19″W	Category B	3591	Upload Photo
Cullaloe Tower				56°05′02″N 3°18′43″W	Category C(S)	3602	Upload another image
Aberdour, 6, 7 Livingston Lane				56°03′13″N 3°18′00″W	Category B	3613	Upload another image
Aberdour, 5 Livingston Lane, Glenelm				56°03′13″N 3°18′00″W	Category C(S)	3614	Upload another image
Aberdour, 55 High Street				56°03′12″N 3°18′08″W	Category C(S)	3618	Upload Photo
Aberdour, Cuttlehill, Aberdour House Obelisk				56°03′09″N 3°17′56″W	Category B	3638	Upload Photo
Aberdour, Hillside House Walled Garden				56°03′31″N 3°18′06″W	Category C(S)	49677	Upload Photo
Aberdour, 73 Main Street, Including Boundary Wall				56°03′28″N 3°17′41″W	Category B	49679	Upload Photo
Aberdour, 22 Shore Road, Whitehall Including Boundary Walls And Gatepiers				56°03′11″N 3°18′00″W	Category C(S)	49684	Upload Photo
Mill Farm Road, Mill Farmhouse And Steading Including Boundary Walls				56°03′21″N 3°18′29″W	Category B	45594	Upload Photo
Aberdour, Inverkeithing Road, St Colme House North Entrance Gate Lodge Including Quadrant Walls With Railings, Piers And Gates				56°03′04″N 3°19′02″W	Category B	6633	Upload Photo
Aberdour, 73, 75 High Street Including Adjoining Arch				56°03′12″N 3°18′10″W	Category C(S)	3586	Upload another image
Aberdour, 4 Seaside Place, St Helen's				56°03′06″N 3°17′56″W	Category C(S)	3630	Upload Photo
Aberdour, Shore Road, Seabank House Including Boundary Walls				56°03′04″N 3°17′53″W	Category A	3632	Upload another image
Aberdour, 36 Main Street				56°03′23″N 3°17′51″W	Category B	3574	Upload Photo
Aberdour, 41 High Street				56°03′13″N 3°18′08″W	Category B	232	Upload another image
Aberdour, 36 High Street				56°03′13″N 3°18′09″W	Category C(S)	49676	Upload Photo
Aberdour, 64, 66 Main Street				56°03′25″N 3°17′45″W	Category C(S)	49680	Upload Photo
Aberdour, 68 High Street				56°03′12″N 3°18′11″W	Category B	3588	Upload another image
Aberdour, Hillside House Including Pedestrian Gate To South Boundary Wall				56°03′26″N 3°18′07″W	Category B	3596	Upload Photo
Aberdour, Aberdour House Entrance Gateway Including Connecting Walls With Terminating Obelisks				56°03′15″N 3°18′02″W	Category B	3639	Upload Photo
Aberdour, Dour Cottage				56°03′15″N 3°18′02″W	Category C(S)	3640	Upload another image
Aberdour, 10,12,14,16 Seaside Place, Forth House				56°03′05″N 3°17′57″W	Category B	3565	Upload Photo
Easterheughs Including Gate Piers And Boundary Wall, Garage, Boiler House (Former Log Store) And Pump House				56°03′37″N 3°16′11″W	Category A	49686	Upload Photo
Aberdour, Wester Aberdour Dovecot				56°03′09″N 3°18′22″W	Category B	3594	Upload Photo
Cullaloe Farmhouse Including Outhouse				56°04′57″N 3°18′16″W	Category B	3601	Upload Photo
Couston Castle Including Walled Garden And Garage				56°03′05″N 3°20′13″W	Category C(S)	3606	Upload Photo
Aberdour Kirk, St Filan's (Church Of Scotland) Including Graveyard And Boundary Walls				56°03′19″N 3°17′49″W	Category A	3608	Upload another image See more images
Aberdour, 43, 45, 47, 49, 51 High Street Including Rear Outbuildings				56°03′13″N 3°18′08″W	Category C(S)	3617	Upload another image
Aberdour Railway Station, Including Shelter, Footbridge And Signal Box				56°03′17″N 3°18′04″W	Category B	3629	Upload another image See more images
Aberdour, High Street, K6 Telephone Kiosk At Clock Tower				56°03′15″N 3°18′03″W	Category B	3550	Upload another image See more images
The Murrel, Kate Randall's Cottage				56°03′59″N 3°18′09″W	Category B	3551	Upload another image
Oxcars Lighthouse, Firth Of Forth				56°01′21″N 3°16′49″W	Category B	49687	Upload another image See more images
Aberdour, 70 High Street, Anvil House				56°03′12″N 3°18′12″W	Category C(S)	3589	Upload another image
Cullaloe Dry Bridge				56°05′10″N 3°18′08″W	Category C(S)	3600	Upload another image
Whitehill Dovecot				56°03′45″N 3°19′13″W	Category B	3604	Upload another image
Whitehill Policies, Black Lodge Including Boundary Wall				56°03′26″N 3°19′01″W	Category B	3605	Upload Photo
Aberdour, 57 High Street				56°03′12″N 3°18′09″W	Category C(S)	3619	Upload another image
Aberdour, 2 Seaside Place, Clachaig Including Boundary Wall With Post Box				56°03′06″N 3°17′56″W	Category B	3631	Upload another image
Aberdour, 13 Manse Street, Woodlee				56°03′05″N 3°18′01″W	Category B	3563	Upload Photo
Aberdour, 3 Sands Place, High Street, Verona Cottage				56°03′04″N 3°18′04″W	Category C(S)	3564	Upload another image
Aberdour, High Street, East Lodge Including Screen Walls, Gates, Gatepiers And Railings				56°03′10″N 3°18′14″W	Category A	6632	Upload another image
Aberdour, Harbour Pier Including Workshop/Club House				56°03′07″N 3°17′40″W	Category B	3595	Upload another image See more images
Aberdour, 9 Main Street, Templeland				56°03′23″N 3°17′52″W	Category C(S)	3633	Upload Photo
Aberdour, High Street, The Woodside Hotel				56°03′11″N 3°18′15″W	Category B	3560	Upload another image See more images
Aberdour, 2 Sands Place, High Street				56°03′10″N 3°18′19″W	Category C(S)	49681	Upload another image
Visitor Centre and Generator House (former engine houses), Inchcolm Island				56°01′48″N 3°17′58″W	Category C(S)	52427	Upload another image
Custodian's House and Well Hut, Inchcolm Island				56°01′47″N 3°18′09″W	Category C(S)	52428	Upload another image

== Key ==
The scheme for classifying buildings in Scotland is:

- Category A: "buildings of national or international importance, either architectural or historic; or fine, little-altered examples of some particular period, style or building type."
- Category B: "buildings of regional or more than local importance; or major examples of some particular period, style or building type, which may have been altered."
- Category C: "buildings of local importance; lesser examples of any period, style, or building type, as originally constructed or moderately altered; and simple traditional buildings which group well with other listed buildings."

In March 2016 there were 47,288 listed buildings in Scotland. Of these, 8% were Category A, and 50% were Category B, with the remaining 42% being Category C.

== See also ==
- List of listed buildings in Fife
