= Strathclyde Police Shinty Club =

Shinty club based in Glasgow, Scotland

Strathclyde Police
- Full name: Strathclyde Police Shinty club
- Gaelic name: Comann Camanachd Poileas Shrath Chluaidh
- Nickname: The Police
- Founded: 1963
- Ground: Lochinch, Glasgow
- 2007: Withdrew
Home

Strathclyde Police Shinty Club was a shinty club based in Glasgow, Scotland, the club represents the Strathclyde Police force and draws its players mostly from serving officers. The club went into abeyance in 2000 but entered the south leagues in 2007.

== History ==
The club was established in 1963 as the Glasgow Police Shinty Team but regionalization led to the adoption of the present name. the club was the brainchild of Dr John Dugald Murchison, who felt a club made of serving police officers (Glasgow having a tradition of having police officers from the Scottish Highlands) would be an ample replacement for the then recently defunct Glasgow Skye. The club was a fixture in the old South Division One until relegation to the South Division 2 which they then won in 1979–80.

The police won South Division Two in 1996.

In 1998-99 the club played in South Division One but was relegated to the South Division Two. The following year, team raising difficulties led to the club going into abeyance. The force re-entered the South leagues in 2007, playing their first game against Edinburgh East Lothian.

The Glasgow Airport Attack on Saturday 30 June 2007 and the perceived increase in security threat meant that the Police team had to withdraw from competition for the remainder of the 2007 season.

It is unlikely that Strathclyde Police will ever retake the field in league shinty, but their old ground of Lochinch is used by Glasgow Gaels Shinty Club, a junior side, who it is hoped will become a senior side.
