= Edinburgh University Shinty Club =

Edinburgh University
- Full name: Edinburgh University Shinty Club
- Gaelic name: Comann Camanachd Oilthigh Dhun Eideann
- Nickname: The 'Burgh, The Royal Shinty Team
- Founded: 1891
- Ground: Peffermill Playing Fields, Edinburgh
Home

Edinburgh University Shinty Club is one of the oldest shinty clubs in existence having been founded in 1891. The club, which represents the University of Edinburgh has both male and female team sides, with players coming from other further and higher education establishments in the city, including Heriot Watt University, Edinburgh Napier and Edinburgh College. Whilst formally a University Shinty team, the club has a long history of playing at national level.

== History ==
The period 1927 to 1933 is the most notable in the club's history, with the university retaining the Littlejohn Vase for six years in succession. In those days the team was also competing in the Southern League and the Camanachd Cup.

The team was once so strong it fielded a second string after the Second World War.

Through the 1960s and 1970s the club remained strong. In the 1980s the club competed in Division Three (South) save for one regrettable year of isolation when fixtures were provided by the Littlejohn Vase. Such a period shows how a university team's fortunes can fluctuate as the season 1986–87 saw the team narrowly miss promotion, 1987–88 saw relegation to Division Four.

In 1991 the club enjoyed its centenary year in which a grand reunion was organised. Guests of honour included Sorley MacLean, who played for the club in the late twenties.

In 2004, the club played its last games of senior shinty with the advent of summer shinty, meaning that the university could not field a team through the summer months. Players now return to their hometown teams or will play for local sides Tayforth Camanachd and Aberdour Shinty Club.

2011 saw a transition period for the club and the resurrection of the yearly challenge match with Trinity College where the Scottish and Irish capital sides play each other at the start of the year in a shinty/hurling match. The trip in 2011 proved so successful that a yearly tour to Dublin is now undertaken and eagerly anticipated. A friendship was formed with St Judes GAA in 2012 where the club travelled to Templeogue for a shinty/hurling challenge match. The club shall now play St Judes and Trinity in alternate years in the Irish capital, alongside St. Brigid's.

The successful ladies' side of the 2000s was instrumental in the foundation of Forth Camanachd and subsequent developments in ladies shinty in the area, with many transferring to Aberdour when Forth folded.

In 2012, the club won the Littlejohn for the first time in 26 years, defeating Glasgow University 1–0 in the final. The club won the Littlejohn again in 2013 where they defeated rivals Strathclyde University 1–0 in the final at St Andrews. The women's team won the McHue and Porter Cup during the same tournament in 2023 with a 1–0 win over Strathclyde University.
