= Uddingston Shinty Club =

Uddingston
- Full name: Uddingston Shinty Club
- Gaelic name: Comann Camanachd Bhaile Udain
- Nickname: Uddy
- Founded: 2019
- Ground: Stepps Playing Fields, Stepps
- Manager: Lee Thompson
- League: South Division Two
- 2025: 4th
Home	Away

Uddingston Shinty Club is a shinty club which plays in Uddingston, South Lanarkshire, Scotland. It plays in South Division Two.

== History ==
Uddingston Shinty Club grew from the establishment of a school club in Uddingston Grammar School in 2016 by a teacher from South Uist, Lee Thompson, formerly of Uist Camanachd, who played for Tayforth Camanachd.

The club was officially founded in 2019.

It developed a women's section and a men's section which entered senior competition in 2022. This was after a delay caused by COVID cancelling the 2020 season and the 2021 season being shortened.

In 2022, Uddingston's men had a difficult first season, being unable to fulfil fixtures on three occasions and finishing bottom. They groundshared with Glasgow Mid-Argyll at Peterson Park in Yoker.

From the 2023 season onwards, Uddingston's home games took place at Stepps Playing Fields.

The club has a sponsorship deal with Tunnocks.

During the 2025 season, Uddingston beat Ardnamurchan Camanachd 4-3 in extra time to reach the semi finals of the Chieftain's Cup for the first time
