= Albert Smith Medal =

The Albert Smith Memorial Medal is the award given to the Man of the Match in the final of the Camanachd Cup, the blue riband trophy of the sport of shinty. It has been presented every year since 1972 by the Smith family of Fort William in honour of Albert Smith Sr. (Born in 1888, Lochuanagan, Fort Augustus.) The widow of his only son, John Victor Smith, currently presents the medal. Albert Sr.'s grandson, Victor Smith is a former player for Fort William Shinty Club but never won the medal despite featuring as a key player in several Fort William wins. Victor Smith currently coaches Fort William Shinty Club along with his cousin Adi Robertson. Victor's son, John Victor Smith, plays full forward for the Fort.

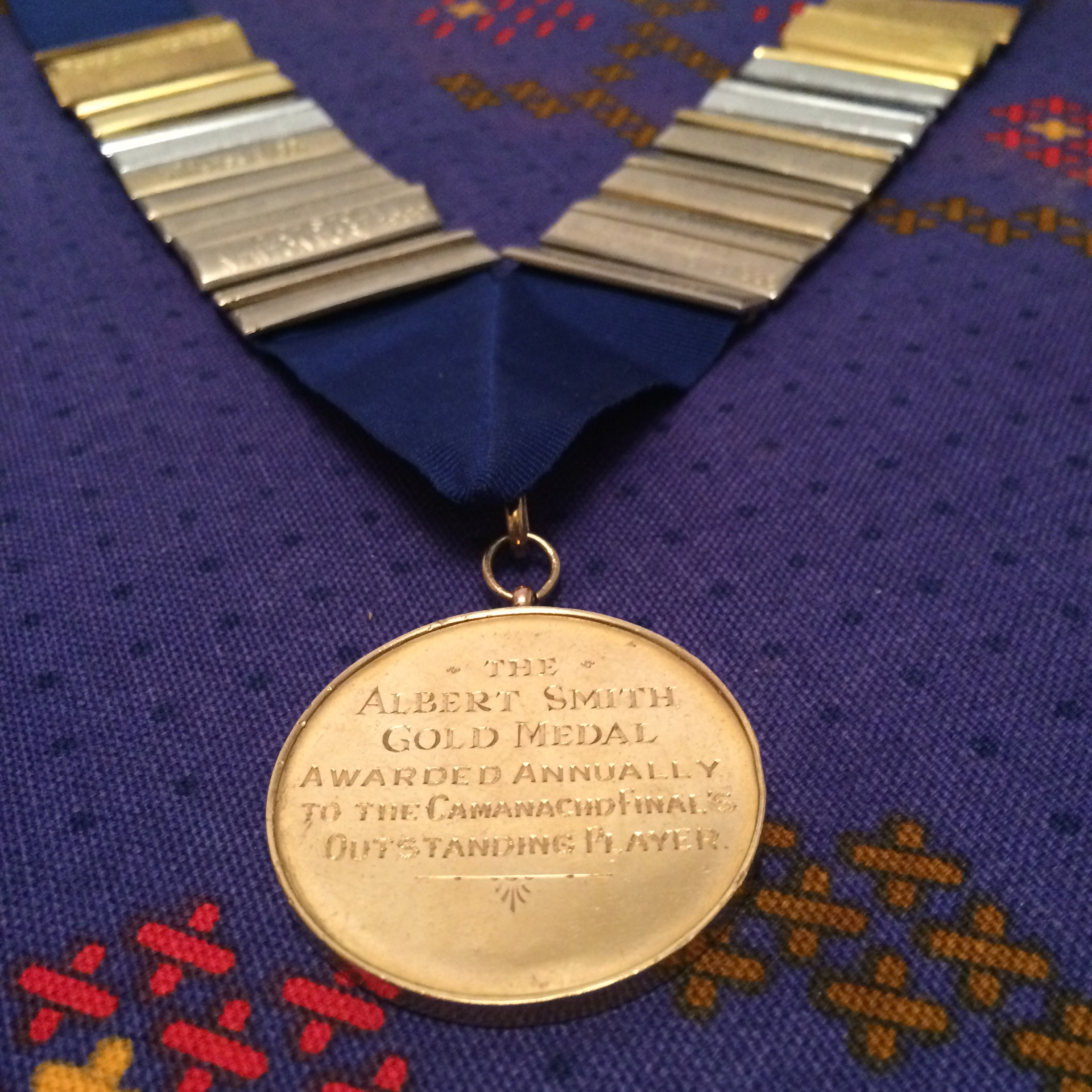
Player of the Match Award for the Camanachd Cup Final

== Previous Winners ==
- 1972 John Campbell Newtonmore
- 1973 Kenny MacNiven Glasgow Mid-Argyll
- 1974 Tommy Nicolson Kyles Athletic
- 1975 Duncan MacNeil Kyles Athletic
- 1976 Neil Blair Kyles Athletic
- 1977 John Mackenzie Newtonmore
- 1978 Hugh Chisholm Newtonmore
- 1979 David Cheyne Newtonmore
- 1980 George Nicolson Kyles Athletic
- 1981 Ricky Ross Newtonmore
- 1982 John Fraser Newtonmore
- 1983 Ewan Paterson Strachur
- 1984 John Russell Newtonmore
- 1985 Norman MacArthur Newtonmore
- 1986 Gordon MacIntyre Oban Camanachd
- 1987 David Anderson Kingussie
- 1988 Ali MacKintosh Glenurquhart
- 1989 Hugh Chisholm Newtonmore
- 1990 Willie Macrae Skye
- 1991 Rory Fraser Kingussie
- 1992 Willie MacDonald Fort William
- 1993 Nonnie MacInnes Oban Camanachd
- 1994 Andy Irvine Kyles Athletic
- 1995 Nonnie MacInnes Oban Camanachd
- 1996 Rory Fraser Kingussie
- 1997 Ronald Ross Kingussie
- 1998 Ali Dallas Kingussie
- 1999 Fraser Inglis Oban Camanachd
- 2000 Kenny MacDonald Kyles Athletic
- 2001 Scott MacNeil Oban Camanachd
- 2002 Ronald Ross Kingussie
- 2003 Ali Borthwick Kingussie
- 2004 Douglas Dando Inveraray
- 2005 Gary Innes Fort William
- 2006 Ronald Ross Kingussie
- 2007 James Clark Fort William
- 2008 James Clark Fort William
- 2009 Donald Irvine Kyles Athletic
- 2010 Gary Innes Fort William
- 2011 Norman Campbell Newtonmore
- 2012 Roddy MacDonald Kyles Athletic
- 2013 Jamie Robinson Newtonmore
- 2014 Ronald Ross Kingussie
- 2015 Stuart MacDonald Lovat
- 2016 Andy MacKintosh Newtonmore
- 2017 Drew MacDonald Newtonmore
- 2018 Evan Menzies Newtonmore
- 2019 Rory Kennedy Newtonmore
- 2020 No final due to COVID-19
- 2021 Connor Cormack Kinlochshiel
- 2022 Rory MacGregor Kingussie
- 2023 Daniel Sloss Oban Camanachd
- 2024 Ruairidh Anderson Kingussie
- 2025 Iain Robinson Newtonmore
- 2026 Ruaridh Anderson Kingussie
