= London Camanachd =

British shinty club

London
- Full name: London Camanachd Club
- Gaelic name: Comann Camanachd Lunnainn
- Nickname: The Londoners, The Exiles, The International Brigade
- Founded: 1874/1992/2004
- League: English National League
- 2019: 1st in English National League 2019
Home

London Camanachd is a shinty club in England. They have historically been attached to the South District. They went into abeyance in 1992 but were reconstituted in 2005. Correction: London Camanachd were still active during the 1990s, albeit limited to a couple of Camanachd Association competitions per annum, and the occasional shinty-hurling tie-up in London with the then Brian Boru's club. Towards 1996-97 it became increasingly difficult to raise a meaningful team for the long weekend journeys North to fulfil fixtures in the Sutherland Cup et al. They played the first officially recognised Shinty match outside Scotland in 80 years on Saturday 22 July 2006 against the Highlanders. Currently the club field men's and women's teams in English and Scottish competitions as well as exhibition matches in Europe, most recently in 2018 in Brussels.

== History ==
The club was formed in 1874, being an amalgamation of London Northern Counties and London Scots. The club toured Scotland in 1909. The club entered for the Camanachd Cup in 1896 and scratched to Glasgow Cowal as they could not afford the trip to Glasgow. In earlier times play was held at Wimbledon Common, Parliament Hill, Kodak Grounds (Harrow) and also at Stamford Bridge, the current ground of Chelsea F.C. London Camanachd Club took part in a shinty circuit and played for trophies, along with teams from the north and midlands. Between 1873 and 1915 regular play was held on Good Friday and Boxing Day at Wimbledon. Of all the London clubs only London Camanachd continued until the 1920s and 1930s. The club lost many players in the Great War and this is commemorated by a war memorial in Crown Court Church in Covent Garden London.

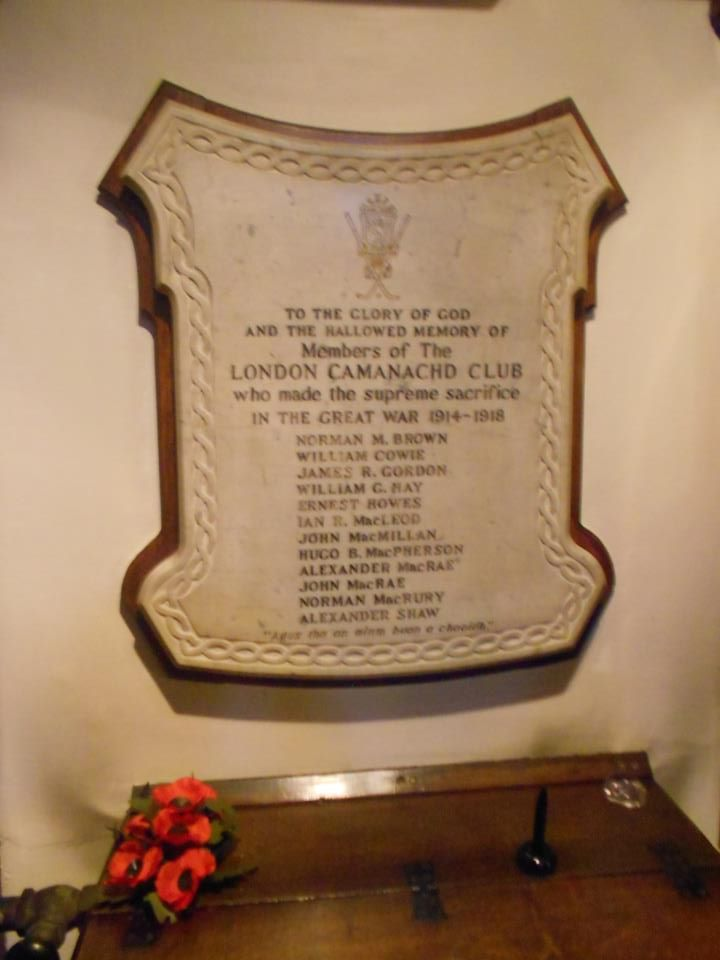
London Camanachd War Memorial

After a long period in abeyance it was re-formed in 1982 by Hugh O'Kane and Sean Reid, before folding again in 1992. Between 1982 and 1992 play was held at Northolt. The only trophy won was the Skeabost Horn in 1985. Semi finals of both the Balliemore and Bullough Cups were reached in 1984–85. Nine matches were played that year, more than in any other, and the Shinty Year Book Trophy was awarded for endeavour. As in its early years the club had the same difficulties in raising a team and finding money to travel to Scotland, local competitions were organised for such as Mr Macleod's Cup 1882, Inverness Association Cup (a silver-mounted ram's head) 1901, The Dewar Shield 1908, Young Cup 1913, London Challenge Cup donated by the chief, Mr R.T.S. Macpherson, in 1986. The club won this trophy for four years until 1990 when Fr. Murphy's won it. In 1991, Brian Boru, having entered every year, won it. The club's furthest advance in the Camanachd Cup was in 1984 when it lost to Skye in the quarter final. In 1989 the club donated the London Shield for the national juvenile play-off. Kilmory, Glasgow Highland and Scottish university teams have made the long trip to win the London Cup. There was some youth coaching done at Chipping Campden School in the 1970s and 1980s.

In October 2004 a group of passionate individuals, originally from both sides of the border, decided to reform the club with both a women's and men's teams. They competed in the Bullough Cup, recording their first competitive win since abeyance against Aberdour. In July 2006, in the Bullough Cup, they played a home match in London- the first competitive match in London in eighty years. In 2007, the club won the Inverness 6s Rosedene Shield against Boleskine Camanachd. In 2008, the club entered both the Sutherland cup and the Bullough cup but in 2009 the team was not entered into competition. London entered the Bullough Cup in 2010 but did not fulfill their fixture.

March 2011 began a new chapter in the club's history strengthened by the advent of the Cornwall Shinty Club in 2012 and Oxford Shinty Club in 2013. This has provided regular local opposition and allowed the contesting of the English Shinty Championships annually. The brief existence of teams in Northallerton and Nottingham provided further opportunities to play. London have entered the St. Andrews 6s and Edinburgh University 6s tournament annually as well as providing players to the English Shinty Team in the Bullough Cup each summer rather than enter their own team. They hold an open 12 a side tournament in London each year in the weeks following the Camanachd Cup final.

Although London is the traditional home for shinty in England, thanks to Highland exiles, and latterly Scottish university graduates basing themselves in the English capital, local oral history in Cornwall records the game being played amongst schoolchildren.

The revival of the London club has sparked interest in Cornwall, and Cornwall were finally able to offer London some 'local' opposition in March 2012. London's success grew, and the side hosted a successful tournament in September 2011 featuring the hosts, Cornwall and the SCOTS Camanachd. London have also played a composite rules game against Sean Treacy's GAA and Croydon Camogie Club and hope to continue fostering links with local opposition. London Camanachd were also the unlikely stars of a sitcom pilot in December 2012. The influence of the SCOTS and the tradition of England being run by Scottish university graduates has seen a resurrection of shinty in Northallerton as well under the name Northallerton Shinty Club. London amalgamated with Northallerton and Cornwall as the "English Shinty Association" in order to enter the Bullough Cup in 2013, and were knocked out by Tayforth Camanachd in the first round. London made further history in playing a shinty match against Oxford in continental Europe, the match held in Brussels on 25 August 2018 saw London emerge victorious in a 12–1 victory.

Currently, London play in the English National Championship, the English League, the London Shinty Festival and various sixes competitions in both England and Scotland.

== London Shinty Festival ==
Each year the London Shinty Festival Trophy is competed for in 2 open tournaments for men and women, which has had teams from SCOTS Camanachd, St Andrews University Shinty Club, Cornwall Shinty Club, Oxford Shinty Club, and Devon Shinty Club attend.

List of winners of the Men's London Shinty Festival
Year	Winner	Score in Final	Runner up	Other Teams	Location
2012	SCOTS Camanachd		London Camanachd	Cornwall	Tir Chonaill Gaels, Greenford
2013	London Camanachd		Cornwall		Tir Chonaill Gaels, Greenford
2014	London Camanachd	4-2	Cornwall Shinty	Oxford	Tir Chonaill Gaels, Greenford
2015	Cornwall Shinty	Cornwall won on penalties	London Camanachd	Oxford, North Shinty	Tir Chonaill Gaels, Greenford
2016	London Camanachd	6-3	Cornwall Shinty	Oxford, Cornwall B	Wormwood Scrubs
2017	London Camanachd	London won on penalties	Oxford Shinty	Cornwall, Inverthames Camanachd (London B)	Tir Chonaill Gaels, Greenford
2018	London Camanachd	No final	Oxford Shinty	Cornwall	Ruislip
2019	London Camanachd	No final	Oxford Shinty	CSM (Cornwall)	Wormwood Scrubs
2020	Not held				N/A
2021	London Camanachd	No final	Cornwall	Oxford, Bristol	Tir Chonaill Gaels, Greenford

List of winners of the Women's London Shinty Festival
Year	Winner	Score in Final	Runner up	Location
2015	London Camanachd		Cornwall Shinty	Greenford
2016	London Camanachd	2 - 0	Cornwall Shinty	Wormwood Scrubs
2017	London Camanachd	3 - 0	Cornwall Shinty	Greenford
2018	London Camanachd	2 - 0	Cornwall Shinty	Ruislip
2019	London Camanachd	4 - 0	Cornwall Shinty	Wormwood Scrubs
2020	Not held			N/A

== Honours ==
London Shinty Festival (2013, 2014, 2016, 2017, 2018, 2019, 2021)

English Shinty Championship (2012 shared with Cornwall, 2013, 2014, 2018, 2019)

English National League (2019)

Rosedene Shield (2007)

Fingal Memorial Shield (2018)

Oxford 6s (2017, 2019)

London Challenge Cup (1986, 1987, 1988, 1989)
