= Fraser Inglis =

Fraser Inglis (born 5 October 1975) is a retired shinty player who played for Oban Camanachd and Kingussie Camanachd.

== Playing career ==
Inglis started his career at Oban Camanachd. He was instrumental in the successes of the Lorn club throughout the 1990s, winning the Camanachd Cup in 1996 and also picking up the Albert Smith Medal despite being on the losing side in 1999. Inglis was considered to be one of the finest players in the game during his career.

In 2006 however, Inglis left Oban Camanachd suddenly due to conflicts within the club. He promptly signed for Kingussie due to his friendship with Ronald Ross. At this point, Kingussie had just relinquished their record-breaking hold on the Premier Division title and Inglis' signing was controversial as many viewed this turning to an outsider as a betrayal of Kingussie's values. To counter this, Inglis refused to take travelling expenses from his Taynuilt home.

Inglis was part of the record making Kingussie team of 2008 who won the Premier League title with a perfect record of 18 straight wins. Inglis appeared in Six Camanachd Cup Finals but only won it once with Oban. He won two Premier Division titles with Kingussie. He was also capped for Scotland three times - 1999, 2000 and 2002.

Inglis is the only player in the history of the sport to have won the complete set of senior club medals. Comprising the Camanachd/Scottish Cup, Premier League, Macaulay Cup, Glasgow Celtic Society and Mactavish Cup.

== Retirement ==
On his retiral from playing the sport, Inglis took up a coaching position at Taynuilt Shinty Club and has been instrumental in helping that club reach a level where they now compete in the Camanachd Cup.

In 2012 Inglis was appointed as the president of The Macaulay Association the youngest president in the associations history. Inglis is also the chairman of Taynuilt Sports Council and has played a major part in the creation of The Taynuilt Sports Hub.

He has also become a respected pundit on the sport for the BBC.

As shinty is an amateur sport, Inglis retained employment as a landscape gardener. He is also a keen amateur golfer.

Inglis is also a keen cyclist with North Argyll Cycling Club. His most recent races were in Peebles, Scottish Borders, in 2021 and in Strathpuffer, Scottish Highlands, in 2019.
