= Strachur-Dunoon Shinty Club =

Shinty team from Strachur, Argyll, Scotland

Strachur-Dunoon
- Full name: Strachur and District - Dunoon Shinty Club
- Gaelic name: Comann Camanachd Sgire Shrath Chura is Dhùn Omhain
- Founded: 2022
- Ground: Strachurmore Sports Centre / Dunoon Stadium
- League: South Division Two
- 2026: 1st
Home	Away

Strachur-Dunoon is a shinty team from Cowal in Scotland. It is a merger at senior level of Strachur & District and Dunoon Camanachd. It started playing 2022.

== History ==
Strachur & District had a significant history as a club, whilst Dunoon had aimed to revive shinty in the town during the late 2010s. Both clubs had folded before the COVID-19 pandemic due to a lack of players, but with an interest but not enough players to sustain two teams, as well as excellent facilities in both communities, the clubs agreed to a merger that preserved both clubs' identities.

The combined team entered South Division Two in 2022 and finished 6th in the league. They played at both the Dunoon Stadium and Strachurmore Sports Centre.

In 2025, after experiencing a significant player shortage, the club were able to weather the storm and finish the season in mid table. Ahead of the 2026 season, Strachur-Dunoon became the reserve team of Col-Glen ahead of their ascension to the Premiership for the first time in history.

The 2026 was the most successful in the club's short history, winning the South Division Two league title for the first time, beating contenders Bute on the final day to allow captain Cammy Middleton to lift the league title. Throughout the season a number of Strachur-Dunoon players played Premiership shinty whilst youngsters from Col-Glen were able to gain experience.
