= Strachur and District Shinty Club =

Shinty team from Strachur, Argyll, Scotland

Strachur
- Full name: Strachur and District Shinty Club
- Gaelic name: Comann Camanachd Sgire Shrath Chura
- Founded: 1880
- Ground: Strachur Park, Home Farm, Strachur
Home	Away

Strachur and District Shinty Club is a Shinty team from Strachur, Argyll, Scotland. The club re-entered league shinty in 2017 after a year at abeyance at senior level as of March 2016. The side was put back into abeyance in 2018 before returning in 2022 with a combined team of players based in Strachur, Dunoon and Glasgow under the banner of Strachur-Dunoon. .

== History ==
The club was founded by 1880 and there are traditions of annual games on New Year's Day, with sixty players from Succoth Glen alone. Two of the earliest matches in which Strachur took part were played against Glasgow Cowal. The first took place at Dennistoun Park, Glasgow, in April, 1880 and it resulted in a draw, four hails each.

In May, 1881, the teams met again on Glasgow Green and play was stubbornly contested. The result was again a draw, three hails each.

The club has won a sprinkling of honours throughout its history, the most recent of these in senior shinty being in 1985, when Strachur won the Glasgow Celtic Society Cup for the second time in four years. The club also reached the Camanachd Cup final in 1983, losing to local rivals, Kyles Athletic 3–2, despite leading 2–1 in the closing stages. This was the first Camanachd Cup final between two teams from the South District. On the next occasion it happened in 2012 Kyles beat Inveraray 6–5 with both teams featuring Strachur men and ex Strachur players, Duncan Kerr in the colours of Kyles and Stuart Robertson for Inveraray.

It won the 2006 Marine Harvest South Division Two in comprehensive fashion, recording comprehensive victories against Aberdour Shinty Club, 12–2 and Glasgow Mid Argyll, 19–0, on the way to victory. The club held its own in South Division One in 2007 but were demoted in 2008 after finishing bottom. Strachur returned to South Division One in 2012 after winning South Two and held their place by finishing 6th in the 8 team league.

In Hugh Dan MacLennan's book Shinty, Strachur had the bold claim that "It has never folded or merged with another club." Unfortunately for the club, these words no longer hold true at senior level at least with Strachur & District pulling their first team from all competition on the eve of the 2016 shinty season.. However the club returned in the 2017 season, starting out again in South Division Two. In 2018 the club won South Division Two but folded before the 2019 season.

Fitzroy Maclean had a longstanding relationship with the club as he was a resident of the local area and the club played in the grounds of Strachur House. The club now plays at a community pitch on the shores of Loch Fyne at Strachurmore. The new pitch hosted the 2012 Celtic Society Cup Final.

Strachur Shinty Club made a return to shinty in 2022, fielding a combined side with neighbours Dunoon Camanachd under the guise of Strachur-Dunoon. Playing kits are rotated and home matches are split between Strachurmore and Dunoon Stadium.
