= Jack Asher (shinty) =

Jack Asher (1927 – 23 June 2015) was a Scottish shinty player, referee, and administrator.

== Sporting career ==
Asher lost an eye at the age of 12 after an accident with an air rifle. Although born in Glasgow, he went to school in Nethy Bridge. He attended the University of Glasgow and was inextricably linked with Glasgow University Shinty Club. He was the club's honorary president until his death. He received a Blue for playing with the university and also received one for Judo.

He was a founder member of Glasgow Kelvin.

After he stopped playing shinty Asher became a very well respected referee. He was to officiate at three Camanachd Cup finals, 1972, 1974 and finally 1991, at the age of 64.

He received a specially created Centenary Award from the Camanachd Association in 1999. In 2008, Glasgow University hosted a special testimonial for him where he was presented with a silver caman as well as another presentation from Kyles Athletic Shinty Club that day in mark of his long friendship with shinty in that area.

His day job outside shinty was as a History teacher at Crookston Castle Secondary School. He was a keen hill-walker and his strong physical fitness allowed him to continue to attend games until very late in his life.

Asher was entrusted with the Skeabost Horn, one of the finest trophies in the sport. He spent the final years of his life as a referee assessor.

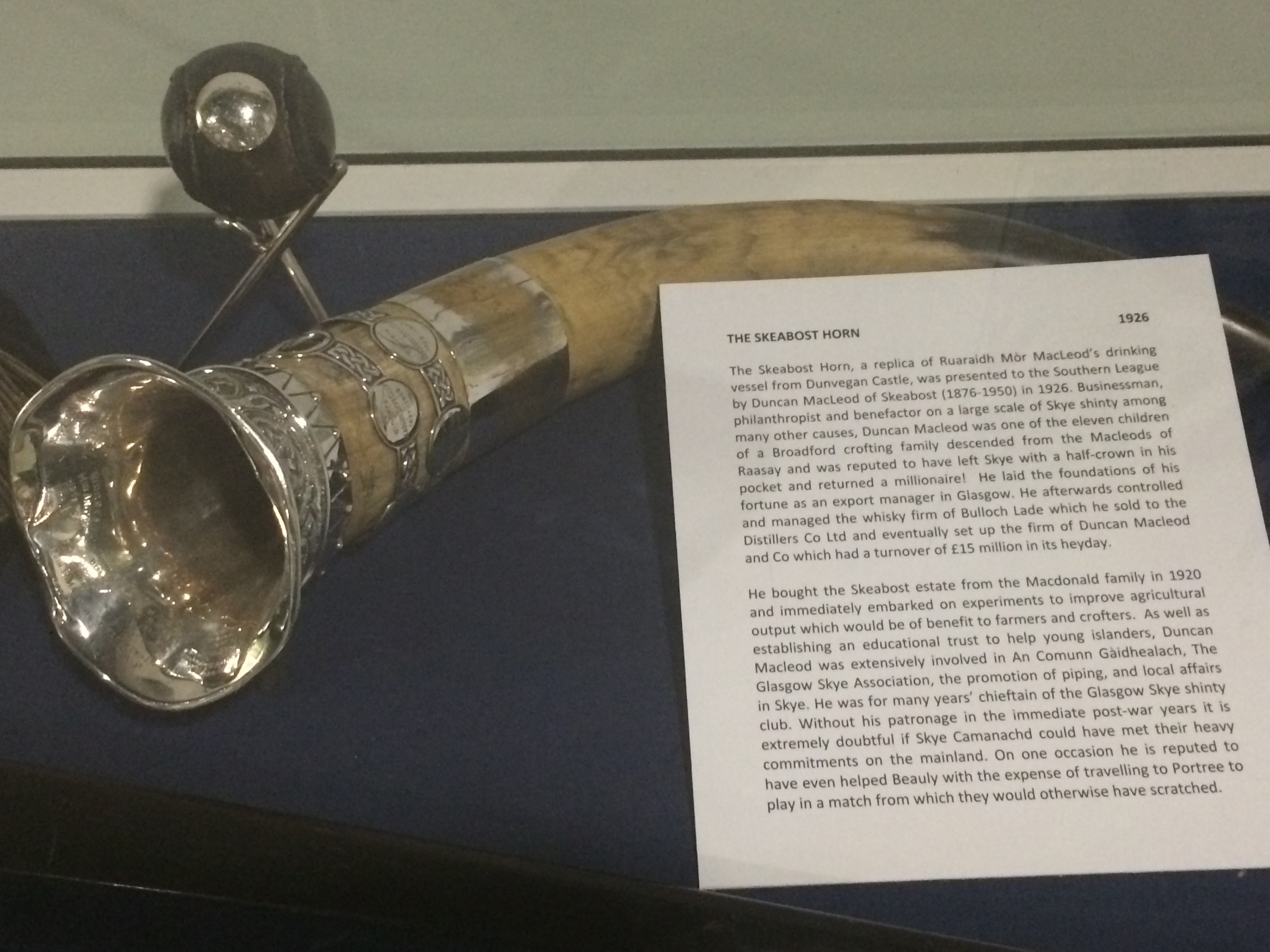
The Skeabost Horn - The trophy for competition in the old Southern Shinty Leagues in Central Belt Scotland - it was entrusted to Jack Asher until his death in 2015.
