= St Andrews University Shinty Club =

St Andrews University
- Full name: St Andrews University Shinty Club
- Gaelic name: Comann Camanachd Chill Rimhinn
- Nickname: Saints
- Founded: 1967
- Ground: University Playing Fields, St Andrews
- League: University Leagues
Home	Away

St Andrews University Shinty Club is a shinty club from the town of St Andrews in Fife. Representing the St Andrews University, the club now plays in the University Shinty league but had a long history of competition in the South Leagues.

== History ==
Due to lacking a strong Highland community like the other three ancient University towns in Scotland, St. Andrews was the last university to enter the senior leagues. Shinty was reintroduced by medical students in 1967, who were looking for an unusual activity to participate in. To this day, the vast majority of St Andrews players are entirely unfamiliar with the sport before they come to the university.

The club enjoyed a more fruitful late 2000s, finishing above Edinburgh and equalled with Aberdeen in the 2007 Littlejohn, in the St Andrews Sixes the team lost in the final to London Camanachd. The club has also benefited from players playing for both the Aberdour Shinty Club and Shinty in the United States, gaining valuable experience.

The club has achieved great success off the pitch, with a membership which far outstrips most shinty clubs in Scotland. The team has many secret traditions handed down from chieftain to chieftain.

The club's women's team has also been successful in recent years. The club originally played in the Women's Shinty League setup but were often overmatched. However, in the 2010s, with a large intake every year of new students, the club has managed to achieve University league success.

The club hosts the annual St. Andrew's Sixes for the Fingal Memorial Shield.
