= Fingal Memorial Shield =

Trophy awarded for winning St Andrew's Sixes

The Fingal Memorial Shield is a trophy in the sport of shinty. It is currently the trophy presented to the winners of the St Andrew's Sixes, an international six-a-side tournament.

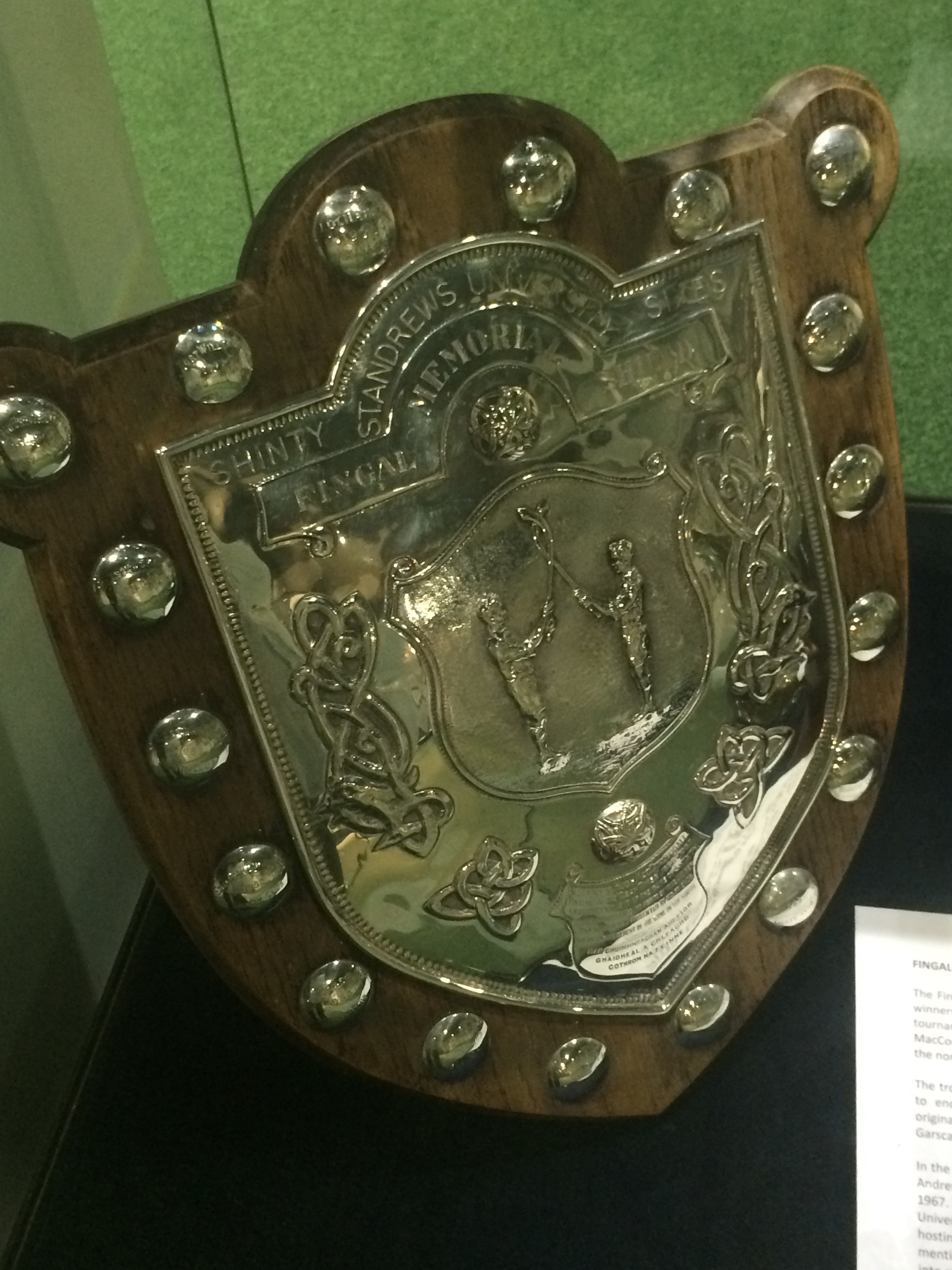
The Fingal Shield

== History ==
The shield was presented in memory of Hugh MacCorquodale, (1866-1937) who wrote for the Oban Times, under the pen name, Fingal. The trophy was presented by the Gaelic Society of Glasgow in order to encourage shinty in the South.

The Fingal tournament was originally played in Glasgow at Glasgow University's then home of Garscadden.

In the 1970s, the tournament was held at Glasgow and latterly at St. Andrew's, St. Andrew's University Shinty Club who were set up in 1967. The success of the tournament was such that when St Andrews University Shinty Club won the 1975 Shinty Yearbook Trophy its hosting of the very successful six-a-side competition was specifically mentioned. However, by the late 1980s, the tournament had fallen into abeyance and the trophy itself went missing.

The St Andrew's Sixes was re-established in 1999 and has been played most years since with both men and women taking part. The shield was recovered for this event and was presented for the next few years until its long stay in Killmallie from 2004 to 2013. It was again recovered for 2013 and was presented to Aberdour Shinty Club. All previous winners were added to the trophy.

Aberdour were the 2017 winners. 2018 saw the first Women's St Andrews Sixes event alongside the men's with The English Shinty Association winning the Women's Trophy and West Coast Nomads winning the Fingal Shield. 2019 saw Cornwall Shinty Club meet London Camanchd in a hotly contested final, which London went on to win 2–1.

== Winners ==
- 2019 London Camanachd
- 2018 West Coast Nomads
- 2017 Aberdour
- 2016 Aberdour
- 2015 Aberdour
- 2014 Inverness-shire Camanachd
- 2013 Aberdour
- 2012 Glasgow Island
- 2011 St Andrews University Exiles
- 2007 St Andrews University Shinty Club
- 2004 Kilmallie Shinty Club
- 2003 Glenorchy Shinty Club
- 2002 Glasgow Mid Argyll
- 2001 Glenorchy Shinty Club
- 2000 Edinburgh East Lothian
- 1999 Musselburgh Shinty Club
- 1987 Aberdeen University
- 1986 Glasgow Highland
- 1985 Aberdeen University
- 1984 Inverness Shinty Club
- 1982 Inverness Shinty Club
- 1981 Inverness Shinty Club
- 1980 Lochaber Camanchd
- 1979 Glenorchy Shinty Club
- 1978 Bute
- 1977 Fort William
- 1976 Lochaber Camanachd
- 1975 Lochaber Camanachd
- 1974 Glasgow Mid Argyle
- 1973 Edinburgh University Shinty Club
- 1972 Glasgow Inverness Shinty Club
- 1969 Glasgow Mid-Argyll, defeating Kelvin
- 1965 Glasgow Police Shinty Club
- 1964 Glasgow Mid-Argyll
- 1963 Glasgow Mid-Argyll
- 1962 Kyles Athletic Shinty Club
- 1961 Bute Shinty Club
- 1960 Bute Shinty Club
- 1959 Glasgow Mid-Argyll
- 1957 Glasgow Mid-Argyll
- 1953 Glasgow Skye
- 1952 Edinburgh Camanachd
- 1951 Glasgow University Shinty Club
- 1950 Glasgow Skye Shinty Club
- 1949 Glasgow University Shinty Club
