= Dunoon (disambiguation) =

Dunoon is a town on the Cowal peninsula, in Argyll and Bute in the west of Scotland.

Dunoon may also refer to:

== Places ==
- Dunoon, Cape Town, South Africa
- Dunoon, New South Wales, Australia

== Ships ==
- HMS Dunoon (J52), Royal Navy Minesweeper

== Other uses ==
- Dunoon Camanachd, is a shinty club, from Dunoon, Scotland.
