= Littlejohn Vase =

Scottish sporting trophy

The Littlejohn of Invercharron Challenge Vase, also known as the Littlejohn Vase, is a trophy in university shinty. It is the second most expensive sporting trophy in Scotland, after the Scottish Cup. The Littlejohn Vase is competed for by university shinty teams on an annual basis, in a one-day event traditionally held at a different university every year, although since 2007 it has been held at St Andrews.

== The Vase ==
The vase is a facsimile in silver of the Warwick Vase discovered in 1770 and on display at the Burrell Collection, Glasgow. It is held in trust by the Aberdeen University Library. Due to its value a stand in quaich is given to the winning side as insurance costs mean the cup may not leave Aberdeen. In 1905 it was bequeathed to Aberdeen University Shinty Club by Alexander Littlejohn. The vase has been played for since 1905, the year of its bequeathment.

== The Album ==
Accompanying the trophy is an ornate album which depicts the history of the game of shinty as well as a record of Littlejohn's gift.

== Winners ==
- 2026 University of the Highlands and Islands at St Andrews
- 2025 University of the Highlands and Islands at St Andrews
- 2024 University of the Highlands and Islands at St Andrews
- 2023 University of Strathclyde at St Andrews
- 2022 University of Strathclyde at St Andrews
- 2019 University of Edinburgh at St Andrews
- 2018 University of Strathclyde at St Andrews
- 2017 University of Strathclyde at St Andrews
- 2016 University of Strathclyde at St Andrews
- 2015 University of Strathclyde at St Andrews
- 2014 University of Edinburgh at St Andrews
- 2013 University of Edinburgh at St Andrews
- 2012 University of Edinburgh at St Andrews
- 2011 University of Strathclyde at St Andrews
- 2010 Robert Gordon University at St Andrews
- 2009 Robert Gordon University at St Andrews
- 2008 University of Strathclyde at St Andrews
- 2007 University of Strathclyde at St Andrews
- 2006 Robert Gordon University at Musselburgh
- 2005 University of Strathclyde at Aberdeen
- 2004 Robert Gordon University at Aberdeen
- 2003 University of Abertay Dundee at Dundee
- 2002 University of Glasgow at St Andrews
- 2001 University of Glasgow at Glasgow

1998 University of Glasgow at Perth

- 1973 University of Aberdeen

The vase has been a prize for at least 100 years. In 2009 the competition was postponed but eventually played.
