= Eilidh Middleton =

Scottish equestrian

Eilidh Middleton (born 29 October 1990) is an equestrian competitor from Finzean, Banchory, Aberdeenshire, Scotland.

== Sporting achievements ==
Eilidh has represented Britain at International and University level and won the Student Riders Nations Cup in the Netherlands in 2011 just before graduating with a BA (Hons.) from Robert Gordon University. She has aspirations to achieve Olympian status.

She also plays shinty and was a key part of the RGU ladies' team.
