= Stirling Camanachd Club =

Stirling
- Full name: Stirling Camanachd Club
- Gaelic name: Comann Camanachd Shruighlea
- Nickname: The Wolves
- Founded: 2024
- Ground: The Haws, Stirling
- Manager: Neil Sutherland
- League: South Division Two
- 2025: 6th
Home

Stirling Camanachd Club is a shinty club which plays in Stirling, Stirlingshire, Scotland. It plays in South Division Two.

== History ==
Stirling Camanachd Club grew from a grassroots youth initiative led by Neil Sutherland. Very rapidly the club secured a pitch at The Haws in Stirling and attracted enough players to enter cup and league competition.

The club was announced as entering South Division Two in January 2025.
