= Kenny MacDonald (shinty player) =

Shinty player (born 1965)

Kenny MacDonald (born 1965) is a goalkeeper in the sport of shinty. He plays for Kyles Athletic and he is noted for his longevity in the sport, having played at the top of the sport for over 30 years.

== Shinty career ==
He won the Camanachd Cup in his first Cup Final in 1983 against Strachur and against Fort William in 1994 as well being named the Albert Smith Medal winner in the 2000 final despite being on the losing side against Kingussie. His performance in the penalty shoot out against Skye Camanachd in the semi-final is considered one of the great performances of all time. He then competed in the 2009 cup final.

He is the only person to have won the Macaulay Cup whilst playing alongside his own son. He and his son Roddie achieved this feat in 2011. Indeed, the only trophy he has not won is the Premier Division.

His nickname is "Donga".
