= Single Team Club Competition =

The Chieftain's Cup Competition is a knock-out cup competition in the sport of shinty. It was first competed for in 2022 under the Single Team Club Competition. Col-Glen Shinty Club were the first winners. Ahead of the 2025 season the competition was renamed the Chieftain's Cup by the Camanchd Association to honour the important Chieftain's of the organisation and clubs.

== History ==
The Camanachd Association established the Single Team Club Competition in 2022. Only clubs with one team could enter. This was to provide a new-level of competition for these clubs, with the opportunity to win silverware.

The competition was divided into North and South sections. The North section contained Glengarry, Strathspey, Lochcarron, Aberdeen University, Lochcarron, Boleskine and Lewis. The South section contained Kilmory, Col-Glen, Ballachulish, Cruachanside, Ardnamurchan, Tayforth and Strachur-Dunoon. Glengarry and Col-Glen would meet in the final held in Taynuilt.

== Winners and Finals ==
2022 Col-Glen 2, Glengarry 1, at The Sports Field, Taynuilt

2023 Glengarry 3, Kilmory 0, at An Aird, Fort William

2024 Glengarry 5, Kilmory 2, at Jubilee Park, Ballachulish

2025 Oban Celtic 4, Ballachulish 2, at Playing Fields, Cannich

2026 Glengarry 1, Lewis 0, at Bught Park, Inverness

== Total titles won ==
=== Wins by club ===
Club	Total	Years
Glengarry	3	2023, 2024, 2026
Col-Glen	1	2022
Oban Celtic	1	2025

=== Runners-up by club ===
Club	Total	Years
Kilmory	2	2023, 2024
Glengarry	1	2022
Ballachulish	1	2025
Lewis	1	2026
