= Dunoon Camanachd =

Dunoon
- Full name: Dunoon Camanachd
- Gaelic name: Comann Camanachd Dhùn Omhain
- Nickname: The Dùnachs
- Founded: 2015
- Ground: Dunoon Stadium
Home	Away

Dunoon Camanachd is a shinty club, from Dunoon, Scotland. The team competed from 2016 to 2017 in South Division Two but its senior side went into abeyance in 2018.

== History ==
Whilst the Cowal peninsula, especially Tighnabruaich, is one of the strongholds of the sport, the town of Dunoon has historically not had a senior men's team of its own. The town is, however, the home of Cowal and Bute Camanachd ladies team, Dunoon & District Junior Shinty club and the Dunoon Grammar School team.

In addition, Dunoon Stadium used to host the Cowal Gathering Shinty Sixes competition before this was put into abeyance, and in 2006 hosted the Final of the Camanachd Cup, shinty's premier event. It was overlooked for the 2015 Final in favour of Oban.

== Formation ==
Keen to give the town a team of its own, a small group of local players established Dunoon Camanachd in January 2015. Drawing on local players who had fallen out of the game, and the committed Dunoon diaspora, the team enjoyed instant success in its first ever outing, winning Edinburgh University Shinty Club's Dropkick Murphy Sixes in March 2015. Next up was the St Andrew's University Shinty Club's annual six-a-side tournament in May 2015, where the Dùnachs reached the semi-finals before losing out to eventual winners Aberdour Shinty Club.

The next step for the fledgling club was to play a full 12-a-side match. Glenorchy Camanachd provided the opposition for the historic occasion at Dunoon Stadium on Sunday 24 May 2015, as Dunoon Camanachd played its first ever full match. The game ended in a fine 2–1 victory for Dunoon, with Robert Flint scoring the club's first ever goals.

Further friendlies followed throughout the summer of 2015, against Glasgow Mid Argyll Shinty Club, the English Shinty Association and Glenorchy again.

The club decided to build on its 2015 successes by seeking entry to the Camanachd Association's league structure, and began competing in South Division 2 in the 2016 season. The club finished bottom of the table with 4 points in their first full season.

However, the club made the decision to pull out of senior shinty for the 2018 season and remains in abeyance at this level.
