= SCOTS Camanachd =

SCOTS
- Full name: SCOTS Camanachd
- Gaelic name: Comann Camanachd an Airm
- Nickname: SCOTS
- Founded: 1994
- Ground: Levenhall Links, Musselburgh
- Manager: Colin Irving
- League: Cups Only
- 2014: First Round Sutherland Cup
Home

SCOTS Camanachd is the only shinty team in the British Armed Forces.

== History ==
It was established in 1994 by Fraser MacKenzie and the club originally played under the name of the Queen's Own Highlanders.

They continued as the Highlanders Shinty Club representing the Highlanders (Seaforth, Gordons and Camerons) regiment which in 2006 was amalgamated into the Royal Regiment of Scotland as the 4th Battalion is an infantry battalion of the British Army.

The club narrowly lost out in 2003 in South Division 2 to Glasgow University Shinty Club.

Due to the 4th Battalion's regular placements abroad, the team at present only plays in cup matches and friendlies. In 2006, the club played the first competitive Shinty game outside Scotland for 80 years, losing to London Camanachd 1-0 in the Bullough Cup, although they won the tie 9-1 on aggregate. They then progressed to the final where they defeated Lochside Rovers 3-1 to win their first ever national trophy of the competition on 23 September 2006, two months after returning from Basra.

The club did not enter competition in 2007 or 2008 due to operational reasons and re-emerged under the name, the SCOTS Shinty Club in 2009. The SCOTS is an abbreviation of the Royal Regiment of Scotland.

The club re-entered competition in 2009 under its new name and competed in the Sutherland and Bullough Cups once again. The team lost 2-1 to Kinlochshiel in the Sutherland Cup in 2009. The club was hit by tragedy when player Scott Bain died in a tragic accident whilst on leave on 20 July 2009.

The club undertook a tour of the Hebrides in 2009. In January 2010, they started marketing themselves to servicemen throughout the British Armed Forces and to veterans.

Whilst the club draws many of its players from Shinty playing parts of the Highlands, in particular the 4th Battalion (The Highlanders) but also the 5th Battalion (Argyll and Sutherland Highlanders), the club also look to encourage the sport throughout the British armed forces. With an increasingly wide range of armed forces personnel a rebranding exercise was undertaken and the club renamed SCOTS Camanachd for 2012.

Thanks to a deal struck between the Camanachd Association and British Forces Broadcasting Service, the players of the SCOTS had the opportunity to watch the Camanachd Cup Final broadcast live across the World on their bases.

Badge from 1994 to 2006.

The Scots played the Irish Defence Force Hurling team in the first ever international between the two countries. They were outclassed by a team with many inter-county players but it was a very successful occasion and may be repeated. The Scots also played in several sixes in 2012 including the St. Andrew's Sixes and the first ever London shinty festival, which they won, defeating London Camanachd and Cornwall Shinty Club.

The Scots celebrated the start of their 20th anniversary season with an appearance in the final of the St. Andrew's Sixes in 2014. They were defeated by Inverness-shire Camanachd.

The Scots continue to enter competitions as of 2018, although they withdrew from the Bullough Cup in the second round giving a walkover to Kyles, having defeated Aberdour in the first round. They took part in the Blue Flash Challenge against Caberfeidh in a friendly match.
