= Glasgow University Shinty Club =

Sports club in Glasgow, Scotland

Glasgow University
- Full name: Glasgow University Shinty Club
- Gaelic name: Comann Camanachd Oilthigh Ghlaschu
- Nickname: An t-Òr is Dubh
- Founded: 1901
- Ground: Pairc na Solais, Garscube, Glasgow
Home

Glasgow University Shinty Club is a shinty club from Glasgow, Scotland. Although formally a University Shinty team, representing the University of Glasgow, it has a long history of competition in national competition.

== History ==
Founded in 1901, by Angus MacVicar, Murdo Mackenzie and Murdo MacRae, with MacVicar as the first team captain. It entered League competition between 1906 and 1908 and played on the pitch of the Glasgow Skye Shinty Club until 1909, after which it played at the Glasgow Cowal Club pitch at Possilpark, Glasgow. The Club became affiliated to the Glasgow University Sports Association in 1911. Throughout the years the club has also been very strong in University competition, its glory years being in the late 1950s and 1960s, when they won the southern league and the Littlejohn three years in a row. Throughout the latter half of the club's existence from the late 1940s until his death in 2015 Jack Asher, who latterly was honorary president, attended games and supported the club. The club organises an annual 6 aside tournament in his memory.

The club struggled in the 1980s although they had reached the final of the Sutherland Cup in 1981 but the late 1990s saw a renaissance in the team, the club appearing in 5 Littlejohn finals in a row, winning the trophy twice and the club's final season in 2003 in the south leagues saw them win South Division Two undefeated. However, the switch to a summer season in shinty resulted in the university leaving the league set-up. Their last senior fixture was a Glasgow Celtic Society Cup match against Tayforth in the spring of 2004.

Since 2004 amid the advent of summer shinty, the club's fortunes suffered a downturn on the park, although membership stayed steady. Glasgow failed to reach a Littlejohn final or challenge for the league between 2005 and 2010 as an exceptionally strong Strathclyde side swept all before them. However, 2011 saw a rejuvenated Glasgow leading the university league and reach the Littlejohn Final for the first time since 2004. The club reached the final again in 2012 but they were thwarted by Edinburgh, who won their first trophy in 26 years, Glasgow's drought now lasting since 2002. In 2015 the club won the university league, notably completing the double over a Strathclyde team that went on to win the Littlejohn that year. The Glasgow University Ladies team won the University League for the first time in 2019.

The club has one of the shortest pitches in shinty and was one of the first clubs to make effective use of the internet as a recruiting tool. The club is also a major force for promoting shinty, through Gaelic the team also known in Scots Gaelic as An t-Òr is Dubh (the Gold and Blacks) and work with Comunn Oiseanach Oilthigh Ghlaschu to promote Gaelic culture on campus.

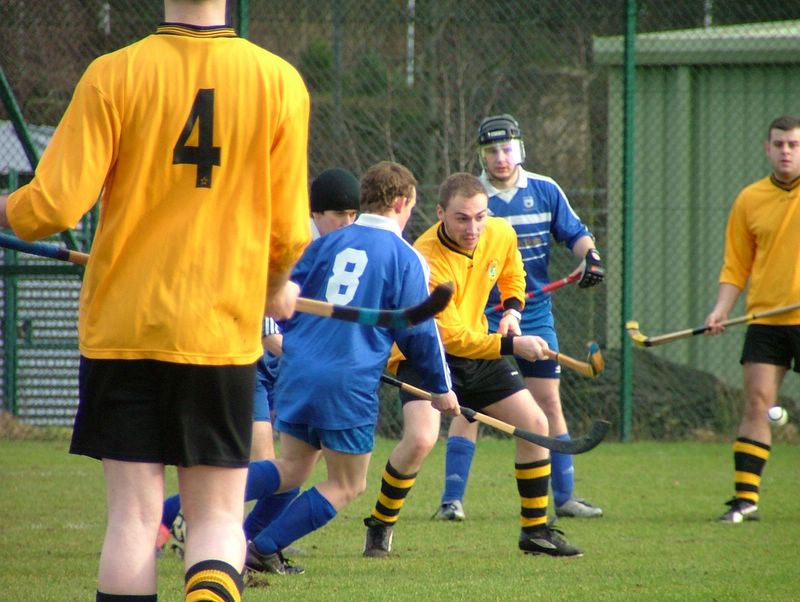
Glasgow University in action against Strathclyde University

=== Archives ===
The archives of Glasgow University Shinty Club are maintained by the Archives of the University of Glasgow (GUAS).
