= Comunn Oiseanach Oilthigh Ghlaschu =

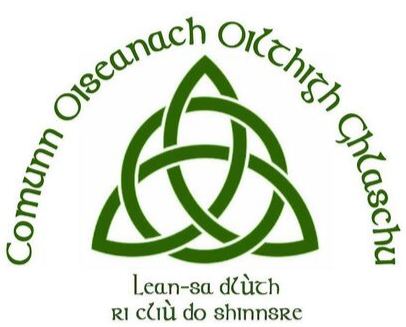
The badge of the society.

The Comunn Oiseanach Oilthigh Ghlaschu ("University of Glasgow Ossian Society") was established in 1831 and is the second-oldest organization on campus. Originally formed as a discussion group in Scottish Gaelic, it has broadened its focus to raising awareness about the Gaelic language and culture, aiming to strengthen it especially among students of the University of Glasgow. The Comunn's motto is "lean-sa dlùth ri cliù do shinnsre".

== Aims ==
- To promote the Gaelic language on and off campus.
- For the discussion of interesting matters among members of the society.
- To put on social events for members.
- To encourage the study of Scottish Gaelic and provide for a natural setting for the language to be used.

== References and external links ==
- An Comunn Oiseanach on Facebook
- Sgeul na Gàidhlig aig Oilthigh Ghlaschu: 19mh & 20mh linn: An Comunn Oiseanach (in Scottish Gaelic)
- Sgeul na Gàidhlig aig Oilthigh Ghlaschu: Sreath-dheilbh: Oiseanaich (in Scottish Gaelic)
