= Ronald Ross (shinty player) =

Scottish shinty player

Ronald Ross, MBE (born 1975) is a retired Scottish shinty player who played for Kingussie Camanachd, who he currently manages. He played as a forward. He is the only player to have ever scored more than 1000 goals in the sport and who has broken several other records as an individual and as part of Kingussie's record-breaking first team.

The media has awarded him the nickname "Ronaldo of the Glens" in tribute to his scoring prowess, drawing comparisons with the famous Portuguese footballer.

== Early playing career and prime ==
Ross made his first Camanachd Cup appearance in 1992 against Fort William as a substitute. His father, Ian Ross, was manager that day, and had not put him in the team due to worries about nepotism. However, Ross proved to be a valuable player throughout the nineties as Kingussie found success

In 2002–03, the last ever winter season for shinty, he scored 94 goals in all competitions. This was more than the accumulated totals for Kingussie's closest rivals, Newtonmore Camanachd Club and Fort William Shinty Club in the league that season. His previous best, in season 2001–02, was 88.

Ross retired from international shinty for the second time on 14 October 2007 after helping Scotland defeat the Irish hurlers in Fort William. He finished the 2007 season, where he helped Kingussie reclaim the Premier League title, with 72 goals.

2008 saw Ross again help Kingussie win the title but he was the victim of strong handed tactics by Fort William Shinty Club in the Camanachd Cup final that year. He scored a goal, akin to one scored in 2006 at the final in Dunoon, but the treatment he received from Adam Robertson was very physical.

== Return to international and 1000 goals ==
Ross returned to International shinty/hurling in 2009 after a call from the management of the Scotland side due to his form in the 2009 season which saw him score 92 goals, two short of his all-time record. Kingussie reclaimed the league with a last day win against Kyles Athletic.

In 2010, after scoring 4 goals to win the Macaulay Cup in extra time, Ross stated that he would review his playing career at the end of the season.

His career total, excluding goals in reserve shinty, is in excess of 1000 goals. On 23 May 2009 he scored his 1000th goal (and 1001st) against Lovat in a MacTavish Cup Semi-final. Aged 39 he retired from 1st team duty the 2014 Camanachd Cup Final, picking up his 12th winners medal after scoring twice to defeat Glenurquhart 4–0, as well as his 4th Albert Smith Medal.

As well as captaining Scotland, he has popularised the wearing of safety helmets amongst young players. He is employed as a shinty development officer by the Camanachd Association, and in 2023 stepped up to the role of National Development Manager.

Ross was appointed under-21 Scotland manager for 2012. before stepping up to the senior team position, managing 6 internationals over a 4-year period. Having continued to manage the under-17 side, he was appointed first team manager of Kingussie after the departure of Iain Borthwick in 2025.

== Recognition ==
He was appointed Member of the Order of the British Empire (MBE) in the 2011 New Year Honours for services to shinty.

Ronald was awarded the Glenfiddich Spirit of Scotland Award for Sport in 2009, the second time he had received this honour.

In 2023, Ronald was inducted in to the Scottish Sports Hall of Fame, becoming one of two Shinty players to have received this honour.

== Prowess in tennis ==
Ross was Scottish junior tennis champion and was Scottish Number Two at the youth level and is friends with Andy Murray. In early 2010, he was injured by tripping on a tennis ball whilst coaching children shinty.

== Newtonmore connections ==
In 2010, Ross was the victim of an April Fool's prank by a shinty website which stated that he would be switching to Kingussie's bitter rivals Newtonmore for his final season in the sport.

Ironically, given his iconic status at Kingussie, Ronald's mother is from Newtonmore. His maternal aunt Ann Sellar, played in the first woman's shinty match for Newtonmore. Also his maternal grandfather, Minto Sellar, won the Camanachd Cup for Newtonmore in 1931. His father, Ian, from Kingussie, was a massive influence on his career. He also has a brother, Ian Jr. Ian was also awarded the MBE for services to shinty.
