= University shinty =

Scottish student sport

In the sport of shinty, there are several clubs which play under the banner of one of the Scottish universities. However, these clubs are not always student teams in the strictest sense of the word, and have a long history of participation at national senior level. Since the introduction of a summer season, only the Aberdeen University Shinty Club continues to play in the senior leagues, although Edinburgh, Glasgow and St Andrews have all done so in the past.

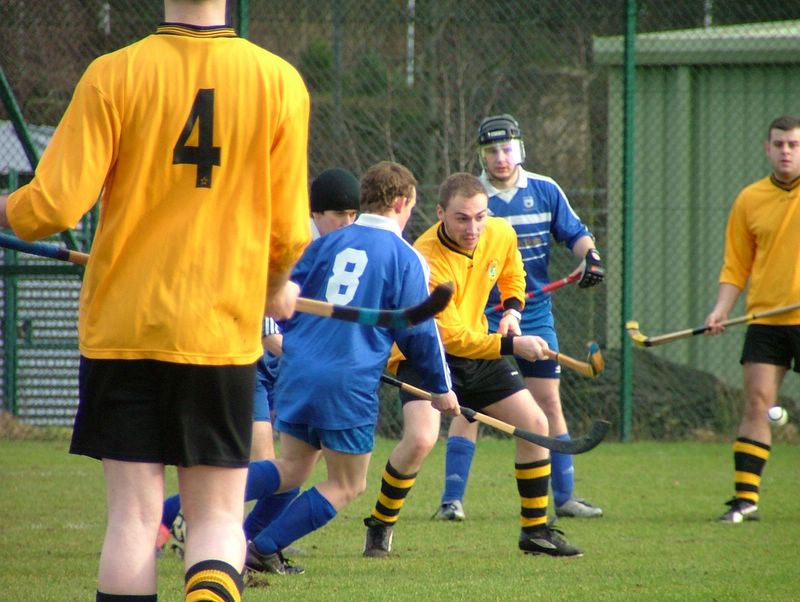
A Varsity match with Glasgow University in action against Strathclyde University

== History ==
Scottish universities have played a major role in shinty since the early days of the sport. The University of Aberdeen club was founded in 1861, and clubs were founded at universities of Edinburgh and Glasgow in the late Victorian era. Aberdeen played in North competitions and Edinburgh and Glasgow competed in South competitions. Often these teams would compete in "Junior" competitions but would also from time to time restrict themselves to the University Littlejohn competition.

University of St Andrews became the fourth and final team to enter league shinty in the late 1960s. This meant that all four of Scotland's ancient universities had a shinty team representing them. The original three had varying degrees of success but won, or appeared in the finals of several cup competitions as well as garnering league success throughout their league existence.

=== The Littlejohn ===
The Littlejohn of Invercharron Vase is the trophy played for by the universities. It was presented in 1905 and has been played for ever since.

=== The move to Summer Shinty and effects on University Shinty ===
The move to the summer season in the sport meant that of the four teams playing in the north and south leagues only the University of Aberdeen continued to play on a full-time basis.

However, the change in status means that players from clubs playing in the National Leagues such as Kingussie and Fort William can now play for their university outwith the senior season. Previously these players could only compete in the annual one-day Littlejohn Vase tournament. They may now play in the winter University League.

The Scottish Universities also have a representative side which currently plays against the British Universities GAA in Composite rules Shinty/Hurling annually.

There are seven teams entering the University Shinty League for the 2010/11 season, these are Aberdeen, Dundee, Edinburgh, Glasgow, RGU (Robert Gordon University), St Andrews and Strathclyde. This season saw the demise of UHI, with many teams sighing in relief. The men's league is currently being led by a rejuvenated Glasgow side, with their female counterpart making a strong start to their season after many years playing under the banner of Strathclyde.

=== Effects of University Shinty on the sport ===
The sport of shinty as a whole has benefited greatly from its presence in universities. Many alumni have gone onto play a role in reviving or reinvigorating the sport in their home area or the area in which they have settled after graduation, including Skye, Lewis, London, Cornwall and Caithness. Many players have retained their links with the sport when otherwise they would have drifted away in the urban area.

== Clubs ==
=== Aberdeen University Shinty Club ===
Aberdeen University
- Full name: Aberdeen University Shinty Club
- Gaelic name: Comann Camanachd Oilthigh Obar Dheathain
- Nickname: The Blues, The Deen
- Founded: 1861
- Ground: Balgownie, Bridge of Don, Aberdeen
Home	Away

For the article about the senior side of the same name, see Aberdeen University Shinty Club.

This club is the successor to the University of Aberdeen side which continued in the senior leagues with the advent of summer shinty in 2004. The two clubs maintain a symbiotic relationship, by having the players from the senior team helping with training. Although non-students can play for the senior side, only students can play for the students' side. Aberdeen University welcome all players from all levels to train and play and are well known for giving people who have never played shinty a taste and help them develop into shinty players. See the senior side article for more information on the history of the club.

=== Edinburgh University Shinty Club ===
See Edinburgh University Shinty Club for more information

The second oldest University club, founded in 1891, Edinburgh has, since 2011 become a force in the university sport, winning three Littlejohn's in 2012, 2013 and 2014. This brought to end an almost thirty-year drought.

=== Glasgow University Shinty Club ===
See Glasgow University Shinty Club for more information

One of the historically successful clubs, Glasgow University has failed to achieve success since winning South Division Two in 2003 and the advent of summer shinty.

=== St Andrews University Shinty Club ===
See St. Andrew's University Shinty Club

=== Strathclyde University Shinty Club ===
Strathclyde University
- Full name: Strathclyde University Shinty Club
- Gaelic name: Comann Camanachd Oilthigh Shrath Chluaidh
- Nickname: The Tech
- Founded: 1996
- Ground: Peterson Park, Yoker
Home

Teams representing the University of Strathclyde had been competing in the Littlejohn Vase since the early 1990s. Most matriculated students who did not play for their home club tended to play for Glasgow University in the senior leagues. Despite being able to draw upon a good base of players and perhaps hampered by a lack of familiarity which other universities had from playing regularly together, Strathclyde did not win the Littlejohn until in 2005 when they also won the first official University league. They reached the final in 2006 when they lost to Robert Gordon. However, Strathclyde once again won the trophy in 2007 which saw them defeat Dundee University 2–0 in the final.

The Strathclyde team have been the strongest force in University shinty in the late 2000s with players from the Premier Division and North Division One making up the entirety of their team. They appeared in five straight Littlejohn finals equalling the record of bitter rivals Glasgow University.

=== Robert Gordon University Shinty Club ===
Robert Gordon University
- Full name: Robert Gordon University Shinty Club
- Gaelic name: Comann Camanachd Oilthigh Raibeirt Ghortain
- Nickname: RGU
- Founded: 1990s
- Ground: Balgownie
Home	Away

Robert Gordon University was started by shinty players such as Davie "Trout" Roberston in the 1990s but became a force in University shinty when Glenurquhart Shinty Club's John Barr who made RGU a tough proposition for any team, especially in Aberdeen, played for the university.

RGU won the Littlejohn in 2004, 2006, 2009 and 2010. The university also runs a ladies' team, which featured Eilidh Middleton, an international equestrian. It also depends on many Irish students with a background in Hurling.

=== Dundee University Shinty Club ===
Dundee University
- Full name: Dundee University Shinty Club
- Gaelic name: Comann Camanachd Oilthigh Dhun Deagh
- Nickname: The Dee
- Founded: 2004
- Ground: Riverside Sports Ground, Dundee
- League: Scottish Student Sport (SSS) University League
Home

Dundee University Shinty Club is a shinty club from the city of Dundee founded in 2004. Its men's and women's teams are representing University of Dundee in University Shinty league and at numerous tournaments throughout the year. The club have performed rapidly since formation winning the SUSF (now SSS University) league in 2006/07 and also reaching the final of the Littlejohn Vase tournament in 2006. The current men's team captain is Hamish Duff.

The women's team was established in 2013 and officially entered University Shinty league prior to 2014/15 season. They also compete in the same tournaments throughout the year as the men's team. The current women's team captain is Kirsty Fraser.

=== University of Abertay Dundee Shinty Club ===
University of Abertay Dundee have the distinction of having won every Littlejohn they have competed in, having only competed in one to this point in 2003 defeating Glasgow University in the final 2–1. They have failed to make an appearance at any Littlejohn since. They have a sixes team which plays infrequently.

=== University of the Highlands and Islands (UHI) ===
The UHI Millennium Institute, which is a collection of various colleges from across the Scottish Highlands and Islands entered a team in the University Shinty League for the first time in 2008. As the UHI has institutions in areas such as Inverness-shire and Lochaber they can draw on a strong pool of players. By 2011 however UHI had folded, the difficulty in fulfilling midweek fixtures for a team made up mostly of tradesmen spread across the Highlands was a contributory factor.

=== University of Stirling Shinty Club ===
Stirling University
- Full name: Stirling University Shinty Club
- Gaelic name: Club Camanachd Oilthigh Shruighlea
- Founded: 2022
- Ground: Airthrey Pitches, Stirling University
- League: Scottish Student Sport (SSS) University League

One of the newest shinty clubs, the University of Stirling Shinty Club was formed in 2022. It has seen relative success, placing third in the Scottish Student Sport Shinty League in 2024 and with the women's team winning the league undefeated in their debut season in 2025. The club has also had players called up for the English National Shinty Team and taking part in the North v South U21s Caol Cup.

=== Playing colours ===
- Abertay: all black with gold trim
- Aberdeen: blue shirts, white shorts, blue socks
- Dundee: red shirts, black shorts and socks
- Edinburgh: green shirts, navy shorts, navy socks
- Glasgow: gold shirts, black shorts, black and gold hooped socks
- RGU: white and blacks stripes or red with black trim
- St Andrews: sky blue and white quarters
- Strathclyde: maroon and grey
- UHI: all black
- Stirling: dark green shirt with light green chevron, black shorts, black socks
