= Edinburgh East Lothian =

Edinburgh East Lothian Shinty Club was a sports club, a shinty club which played in the South Division Shinty League, based in Musselburgh, East Lothian. They were formerly known as Musselburgh Camanachd until 2000. In 2007 they withdrew from the league due to team-raising difficulties. The club is currently dormant.

== History ==
The sport arrived in East Lothian during the early 1990s, principally at the instigation of Dougie Hunter and Ian Watt. The team played originally as Musselburgh Camanachd Club, in royal blue and white stripes, at Levenhall Links.

The club (in all its forms) played in the South Divisions of the Marine Harvest League and associated cup competitions. After a particularly difficult season in the upper division, Musselburgh found itself in a perilous state – it was at this juncture that the club was reconstituted.

At the suggestion of Secretary, Euan FS Pearson, the club reformed in 2000 as Edinburgh East Lothian Shinty Club, (to broaden its catchment area) and a new Constitution was adopted. EELSC were narrowly pipped to the league title during the two years after reformation – the latter amidst controversy over match cancellations/walk-overs. Read more about this period in an extract from the Shinty Yearbook, 2002. The club had links with hurling sides as well.

Successes were also achieved at the St Andrews sixes (1999) and the Inverness sixes Rosedean Shield (2002 and 2004). The club sporadically contested the Hunter Eccles Trophy against St Andrews University.

With the change to summer shinty in 2004, Edinburgh East Lothian found themselves in a large South Division One, where they routinely suffered heavy defeats. However, the scrapping of the National League One in 2006 meant that EEL were to be in a more competitive South Division One. This did not help the club in the long term as the club struggled to fulfil fixtures towards the end of the 2006 season and this trend continued into the 2007 season, where they have folded due to a lack of players.

The club did not re-enter competition in 2008 and some members of the playing squad transferred to The Scots Camanachd, Aberdour Shinty Club and Tayforth Camanachd. Levenhall Links still played host to matches, Tayforth Camanachd took up temporary residence in Summer 2011 with the loss of the pitch at North Inch, Perth.

In 2019 the former office bearers of the club agreed to close down the club's bank account and distribute the funds to shinty-worthy causes. As a result donations were made to Aberdour Shinty Club, Tayforth Camanachd, Edinburgh Youth Shinty and the charity 'Shinty Memories'. A reunion of players from the club in 2020 is now being considered.
