= Col-Glen Shinty Club =

Shinty club in Argyll and Bute, Scotland

Col-Glen
- Full name: Col-Glen Shinty Club
- Gaelic name: Comann Camanachd Chaol-Ghleann
- Founded: 1920
- Ground: Community Playing Field; Clachan of Glendaruel
- Manager: Ronnie MacVicar
- League: Mowi National Division
- 2025: 2nd
Home

Col-Glen Shinty Club is a shinty club based in Clachan of Glendaruel, on the Cowal Peninsula, in Argyll and Bute, west of Scotland.

== History ==
The club was founded in 1920, and was originally called Colintraive and Glendaruel Shinty Club. The name reflects the two villages from which it has always drawn its players and support, Colintraive and Glendaruel. The name was shortened to Col Glen some time in the 1930s. A sign of the changed demographics of the Scottish Highlands is that Col-Glen could raise three full teams and have nine spare reserves in 1938 but now has only one adult side.

Due to the sparse population, the club has folded on three occasions, between 1966 and 1968. 1993 and 1996. and for a longer period between 1997 and 2005. The club restarted in September 2002 with a primary team and within three years it was able to reform an adults team to compete in the Bullough Cup (which it had won in 1983) and then re-entered League Shinty with the assistance of ex-players who returned to the club after having been part of Kyles, Strachur and Bute.

On 12 September 2015, Col-Glen won the South Division Two title under the management of James Edgar, the first league title in the club's history.

16 July 2022, Col-Glen were victorious in the inaugural final of the Single Team Club Competition defeating Glengarry 2–1. Goals from Andrew MacVicar and Jamie MacVicar ensured the trophy was heading to the Glen. A 1st national trophy win for the club in its history.

As well as their cup victory in 2022, Col-Glen won the Mowi South 1 Division title, lifting the trophy on October 15, 2022, after a 10–0 win against Ballachulish. This earned them promotion to the Mowi National Division in 2023.

The club was promoted to the Mowi Premiership after finishing runners up to Lochaber in the 2025 National Division, marking the first time a single team club had ever achieved that feat. Ahead of their maiden season in the league, they merged with Strachur-Dunoon to allow them to field a reserve team in South Division Two. The club made their league debut against Kinlochshiel, being presented with a celebratory plaque ahead of a 3-0 defeat. They achieved perhaps their most famous league result that season, holding league leaders Newtonmore to a 0-0 draw at home.
