= Aberdour =

Coordinates: 56.052778°N 3.302105°W

Aberdour: Scottish Gaelic: Obar Dhobhair
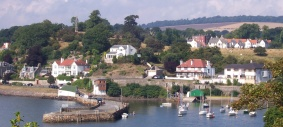
- A view across Aberdour Harbour

- Location within Fife
- Population: 1,710 (2020)
- OS grid reference: NT190852
- Council area: Fife
- Lieutenancy area: Fife
- Country: Scotland
- Sovereign state: United Kingdom
- Post town: BURNTISLAND
- Postcode district: KY3
- Dialling code: 01383
- Police: Scotland
- Fire: Scottish
- Ambulance: Scottish
- UK Parliament: Cowdenbeath and Kirkcaldy
- Scottish Parliament: Cowdenbeath

Aberdour (/ˌæbərˈdaʊər/; Scots: /ˌeɪbərˈdur/, Scottish Gaelic: Obar Dhobhair) is a scenic and historic village on the south coast of Fife, Scotland. It is on the north shore of the Firth of Forth, looking south to the island of Inchcolm and its Abbey, and to Leith and Edinburgh beyond. According to the 2011 census, the village has a population of 1,633.

The village's winding High Street lies a little inland from the coast. Narrow lanes run off it, providing access to the more hidden parts of the village and the shoreline itself. The village nestles between the bigger coastal towns of Burntisland to the east and Dalgety Bay to the west.

The parish of Aberdour takes its name from this village, and had a population of 1,972 at the 2011 Census.

== Etymology ==
Aberdour means 'mouth of the Dour'. The first element is the Pictish word aber 'river mouth'. The name of the Dour Burn, which enters the River Forth at the village's harbour, is from Pictish duvr 'water'. A cognate of this word is also seen in Dover and Andover. The Pictish name was subsequently adapted into Gaelic as obar dhobhair. Aberdour is recorded in 1179 as Abirdoure and in 1126 as "Abirdaur".

== History ==
For much of its history Aberdour was two villages, Wester Aberdour and Easter Aberdour, on either side of the Dour Burn; however this distinction was blurred by the 19th century arrival of the railway.

The original church was dedicated to St Fillan in 1178 but only was given parish status in 1640 when the area was disjunctioned from the parish of Beath and Dalgety.

In the 18th century Aberdour's harbour was improved by the addition of a stone pier to help handle the coal traffic from nearby collieries. However, in the 1850s the traffic changed dramatically, and Aberdour Harbour became a popular destination for pleasure steamers from Leith. This in turn led to the building of a deeper water pier a little around the bay at Hawkcraig, and to the development of hotels and many of the other services still on view today in the village.

The railway came to Aberdour in 1890, with the building of the line east from the newly opened Forth Bridge. The station has won many "best kept station" awards.

== Geography ==
The A921, the main road along the south coast of Fife, leads down the High Street of Wester Aberdour, before kinking sharply left to cross the railway line, then right again to progress through Easter Aberdour's Main Street.

Wester Aberdour has a narrow through road more closely hemmed in by shops and hotels. A number of vernacular buildings of the 17th-early 19th centuries add to the historic scene. Close to the railway bridge, three lanes continue eastwards, presumably once the route of the original High Street before the arrival of the railway. One now leads to Aberdour railway station, a beautifully kept and cared for example of a traditional station, in keeping with its role of transporting at least a quarter of the village's working population to their work each day.

A second lane leads alongside the railway line to Aberdour Castle, while a third leads to the restored Aberdour House. A little further west, a narrow road closely lined with high walls, Shore Road, leads down to the West Sands and the harbour. For many this area is the highlight of any visit to Aberdour; parking at the foot of Shore Road is usually at a premium.

Another road leads coastwards from Easter Aberdour. Hawkcraig Road leads past St Fillan's Church and through Silversand Park, home to Aberdour Shinty Club, en route to a parking area on Hawkcraig. The car park was the site of a whinstone quarry between 1910 and 1933, exploiting the dolerite sill which forms the bedrock geology. The area was then used as the council refuse tip before becoming a car park in the 1970s, part of the overgrown and rocky bluff separating Aberdour's two bays. From here is it a short walk to the Silver Sands, Aberdour's busiest and most popular beach.

On the west side of Hawkcraig Point there is a short concrete jetty that was used as part of the development of radio controlled torpedoes during World War I. The foundations of the Radio Hut can still be seen in the lea of the hill.

== Landmarks ==
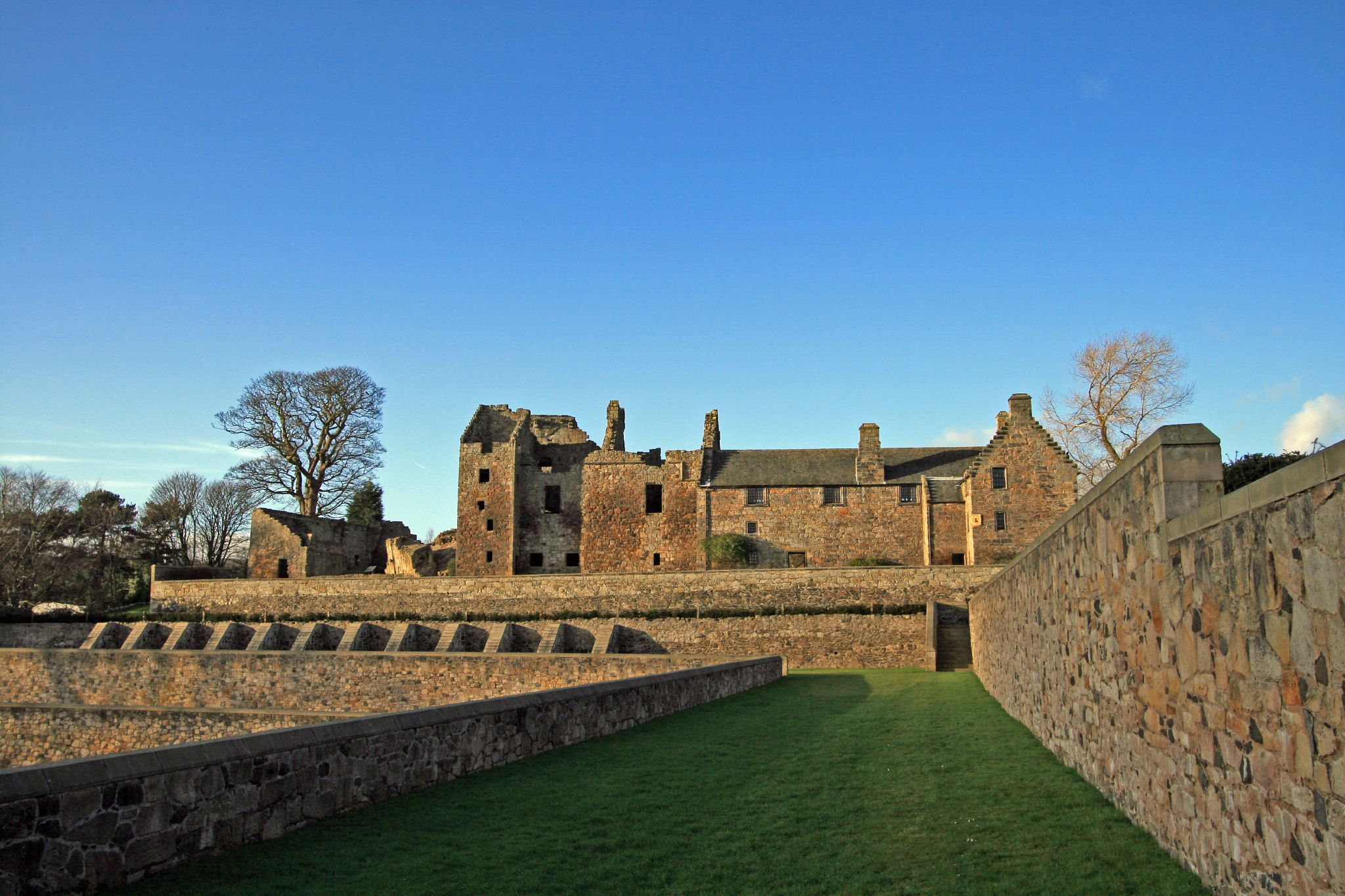
Aberdour Castle

Virtually between the two former settlements, though actually part of Easter Aberdour, lies Aberdour Castle. This started life as a modest hall house on a site overlooking the Dour Burn in the 13th century. The oldest part of the present semi-ruin constitutes one of the earliest surviving stone castles in mainland Scotland. Over the next four hundred years the Castle was successively developed according to contemporary architectural ideas. Notable are the parts, still largely roofed, built by the Earls of Morton, with refined Renaissance detail, in the second half of the 16th century.

A fire in the late 17th century was followed by some repairs, but in 1725 the family purchased 17th-century Aberdour House, on the west side of the burn and in Wester Aberdour, and the medieval Castle was allowed to fall into relative decay. Aberdour Castle is now in the care of Historic Environment Scotland and open to the public (entrance charge). After a period of dereliction Aberdour House was developed for residential use in the early 1990s.

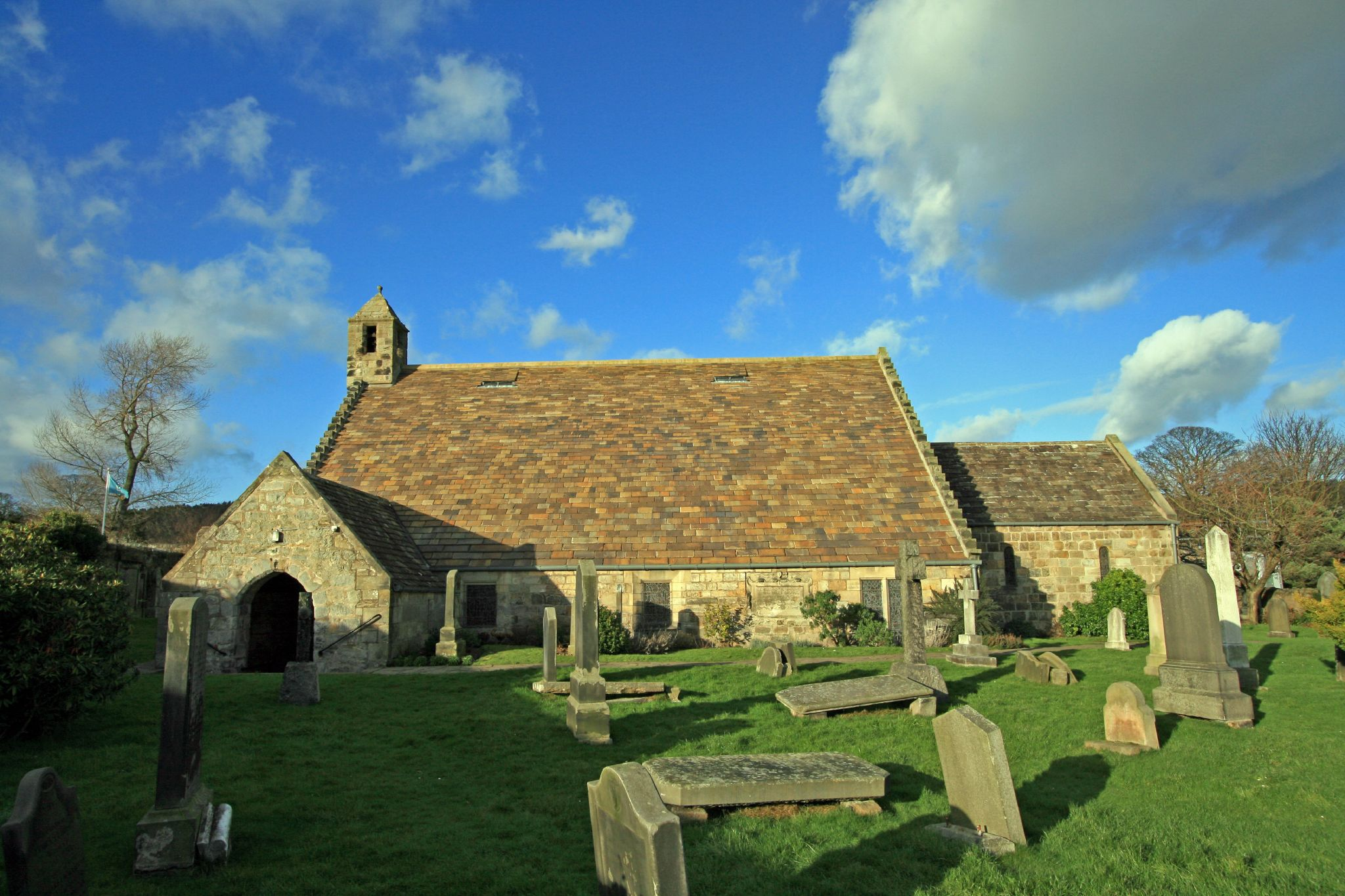
St Fillan's Church

Neighbouring St Fillan's Church is one of the best-preserved medieval parish churches in Scotland, dating largely to the 12th century and originally under control of Inchcolm Abbey. A south arcade was added to the nave in the early 16th century (open in summer). It was controversially considered for closure by the Church of Scotland in 2022, but a campaign was mounted to keep it open.

The Aberdour obelisk was built by Lord Morton on his departure from the village to relocate to a large home in Edinburgh, it was built so he could see his former hometown from his new house when he looked through binoculars – it stands in a cowfield between the castle and the beach.

== Culture ==
Aberdour hosts an annual festival, which runs from late July to early August and features musical events, shows, sporting events and children's events.

Aberdour was a 2005 finalist in the prestigious "Beautiful Scotland in Bloom" awards. It was nominated for "Best Coastal Resort" in Scotland along with St Andrews in Fife, North Berwick in East Lothian, and Rothesay in Argyll and Bute. In 2014 Aberdour was voted Best Coastal Village in Fife and Best Small Coastal Village in Scotland. It also received a Gold Award in Beautiful Fife and Beautiful Scotland. In 2018 Aberdour was voted the second-best place to live in Scotland by The Sunday Times list of Best Places to Live

Aberdour is home to Fife's only senior shinty club. Aberdour Shinty Club field teams in both the men's and women's senior national leagues.

Aberdour is one of the few communities outside of Turkmenistan to celebrate Melon Day on the second Sunday of every August.

== Aberdour's beaches ==
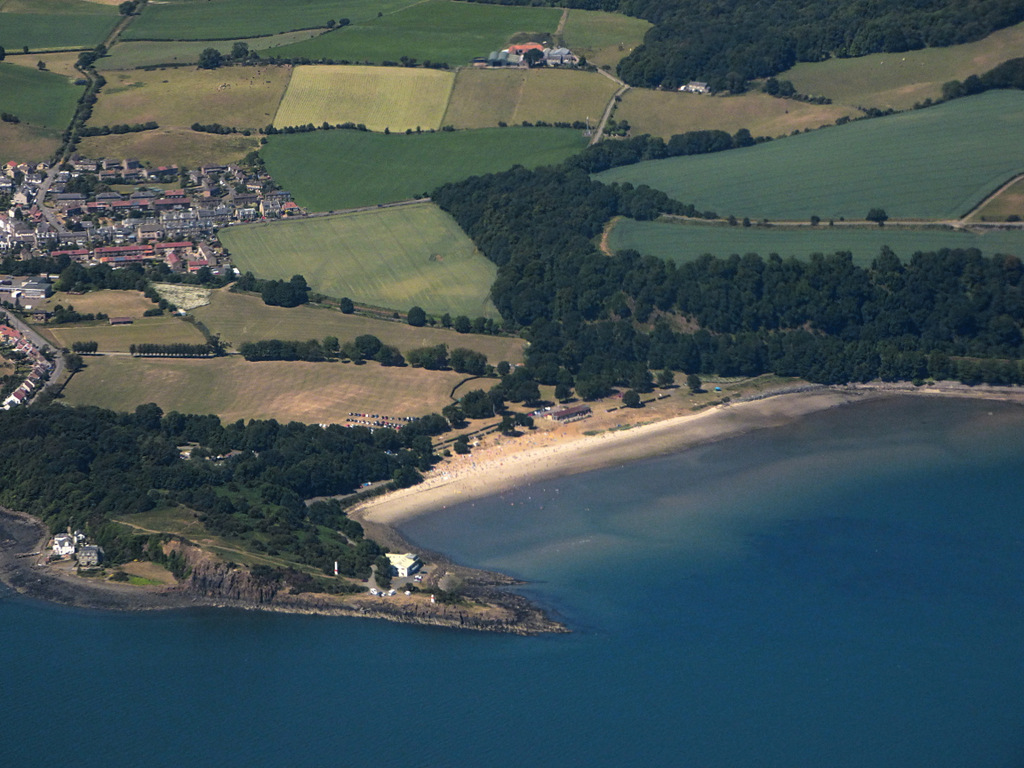
Silversands Bay from the air

Aberdour has two beaches – the Silver Sands, and the Black Sands.

The Silver Sands are located on the East side of the village, and have previously held a "Blue flag" beach award, which denotes an exemplary standard of cleanliness, facilities, safety, environmental education and management. New facilities are currently under construction by Fife Council, which will much improve the beach throughout the year.

The Black Sands (also known as the West Beach), as the contrasting name would suggest, have a rockier and darker sand, and are also popular with visitors exploring the rock caves and unique sea life. During the summer months (April–September), dogs are banned from the Silver Sands but they are allowed all year round at the West Beach. The two beaches are linked by part of the Fife Coastal Path which also takes hikers past the harbour and the Hawkcraig – a popular rock climbing location.

Silver Sands is becoming more popular with open water swimmers, who swim daily in the sea, both as a leisure pursuit, and as training for open water competition. The bay provides safety from the currents, although only the adventurous swim round to the harbour.

Several scenes of Richard Jobson's 2003 movie 16 Years of Alcohol were filmed at the Black Sands in Aberdour.

== Inchcolm ==
The island of Inchcolm, or Island (Gaelic innis) of Columba, 1/4 mile (400 m) from the shore, forms part of the parish of Aberdour. Its name implies associations dating back to the time of Columba and, although undocumented before the 12th century, it may have served the monks of the Columban family as an 'Iona of the east' from early times.

During the First and Second World Wars, Inchcolm was occupied by the army as part of the defences of the Firth of Forth. There are extensive remains of gun emplacements, barracks, etc. from these periods.

The island is notable for its wildlife, especially seabirds and seals. These draw many visitors in summer, along with the remains of the historic Abbey, and is a popular setting for weddings.

== Notable residents ==
Notable past and present residents of the town include:

- Robert Blair (moderator), chaplain to King Charles I
- Rev Robert Liston Moderator of the General Assembly of the Church of Scotland in 1787
- Geoffrey Keyes, recipient of the Victoria Cross
- William Wotherspoon, rugby union player

== Twin cities/towns ==
- Corte Franca, Italy (since 31 July 2004)

== See also ==
- Aber and Inver as place-name elements
- Aberdour Shinty Club
- List of places in Fife
