= Kyles Athletic =

- Full name: Kyles Athletic Shinty Club
- Gaelic name: Comann Camanachd Caolas Bhòdaich
- Nickname: Kyles
- Founded: 1896
- Ground: The Playing Field, Tighnabruaich
- Manager: Stephen Sloss
- League: Premiership
- 2025: 8th
- League: South Division Two
- 2025: 1st
Home	Away

Kyles Athletic Shinty Club is a shinty team from Tighnabruaich, Argyll, Scotland. It is one of the sport's most illustrious names. In 2025 the club fielded two teams, one in the Premiership and the reserve team in South Division Two.

In 2012 they won the Camanachd Cup for the first time since 1994, defeating local rivals Inveraray in the final.

== History ==
The club was founded in 1896 as Kyles Athletic Football and Shinty Club, the same year as the first Camanachd Cup, which Kyles have gone on to win more times than any other club apart from the Badenoch giants, Newtonmore, sharing the second place spot with Kingussie, 21 times in all. They have also won the Celtic Society Cup 29 times and the MacAulay Cup a further 10 times. They won the Grand Slam in 1966. (At that point consisting of the Camanachd, MacAulay, Celtic Society and Dunn Senior League.)

Kyles play in royal blue shirts with white shorts and red stockings as their first set of jerseys were presented by Rangers FC.

Kyles won the Grand Slam in 1966, the only time the club has done so, winning the Dunn League. Until the formation of the National Premier League, Kyles were the dominant side in South shinty, having won the inaugural amalgamated South league in 1974–75 and then winning every league from 1977 to 1988.

A great constant since the late 1970s has been Kenny MacDonald who is still who is still helping manage the first team today. He has played for Scotland and also won the Albert Smith Medal. He was also part of the Kyles team which won the Macaulay Cup alongside his son Roddy.

In the early 2000s they enjoyed a yo-yo existence in the National Leagues and whilst still a match for anyone in remote Tighnabruaich, they struggled to regain their prime position in South shinty until the next decade.

They faced Lochcarron in the play-off for entry into the Premier League in 2006. They lost 2–1 in a close game at The Eilan, Newtonmore, consigning the club to another year outside the top flight.

== Return to the Top ==
On 7 September 2007, Kyles defeated Ballachulish 2–0 away from home to gain promotion back to the top flight.

In 2008, the club played well and stayed in the Premier Division.

In 2009, the club came to international attention when two of their players were diagnosed with swine flu. This resulted in Kyles' fixtures being postponed. The club also made it to the final of the Camanachd Cup after an extra-time replay of a match against Kingussie which they won 4–3. The original game was called off with Kingussie leading 4–1 with 30 minutes left. Kyles went on to lose the final 4–3 in Oban to Fort William despite coming back from 3–0 down to draw 3–3 before the decisive Fort William goal.

Kyles controversially refused to travel to Beauly on 28 November 2009, when bad weather had rendered their park unplayable and no alternative ground could be found for what would have been a title decider for opponents Kingussie. This refusal led to Kyles being docked 2 points, this was appealed and led to Kyles leapfrogging Glenurquhart into 4th place in the 2009 standings.

Kyles started the 2011 season with 5 straight wins, including two important victories away to Inveraray and Fort William. This has raised hopes in Tighnabruaich of a maiden Premier Division title. Kyles went unbeaten for the whole season, winning the MacAulay Cup and the Glasgow Celtic Society Cups. Their only defeats were to Inveraray in the Camanachd Cup and heartbreakingly to Newtonmore in a winner takes all game for the Premier Division at Dunoon Stadium, due to Tighnabruaich being unsuitable. Even more heartbreaking was the manner in which they lost, requiring only a point to make realistically sure of a maiden title, they succumbed to a last minute goal from Danny MacRae.

2012 would see Kyle beaten to the league again by Newtomnmore but this disappointment paled into insignificance with the victory of the team in the Camanachd Cup final in Oban, defeating Inveraray 6–5, in a classic final.

In 2013, Kyle relinquished the Camanachd Cup to Newtonmore 3–0. Kyles had beaten 'More previously in the MacAulay Cup Final and also won the Celtic Society Cup. The second team also won South Division Two.

In the 2015 season, Kyles lifted the Celtic Society Cup for the third year in a row.
