= Aberdour Shinty Club =

Aberdour
- Full name: Aberdour Shinty Club
- Gaelic name: Comann Camanachd Obar Dobhair
- Nickname: The Dour
- Founded: 2001
- Ground: Silversand Park, Aberdour
- League: South Division One
- 2025: 3rd
- League: South Division Two
- 2025: 7th
Home	Away

Aberdour Ladies
- Full name: Aberdour Shinty Club
- Gaelic name: Mnathan Obar Dobhair
- Ground: Silversand Park, Aberdour
- League: National Division One
Home	Away

Aberdour Shinty Club is a shinty club which plays in Aberdour, Fife, Scotland. It is the only senior Shinty Club in Fife and was founded in 2001. In 2011, the club entered two teams into senior competition, its first team competing in the National Division, and its second team in South Division Two.

== Early history ==
Although shinty has an historical presence in Fife, it has not tended to be a hotbed of the game in recent times.

Jamieson records that the old name of shinty in Fife was "carrick", and that it was "still used in the eastern part of that county" in 1825.

However, the sport was played in Glenrothes in the 1970s and early 1980s, in Dunfermline in the early 1990s and St. Andrews University has had a team made up of students since the late 1960s. However, Aberdour is the first club to take a longer-term view of the sport in the Kingdom and have developed a strong junior setup to support the development of the senior team.

It was established in 2001 as a junior side by local Sports Science student Lisa Norman as part of a project at University and within a few years had successful teams playing at all levels from Under 10 to Under 17.

== Entry into senior competition ==
2005 saw their first entry into senior competition, playing in the Bullough Cup. In 2006 the decision was taken to make the step up to full-time competition, entering the senior leagues for the first time, although this was a challenge for a club with such a young squad.

The club finished bottom of South Division Two in its first season, 2006. The club recorded its first win in senior shinty with a 5–3 away win against Edinburgh East Lothian on 28 April 2007 but the club again finished bottom in its sophomore season. In June 2007, Aberdour's Under 17 team were runners up in the MacQuiston Cup.

2008 saw Aberdour begin to mature as a side and they recorded victories against Glasgow Mid Argyll and London Camanachd as well as having significantly improved performances against other teams in the league. The club finished the league second bottom but within three points of third place.

The club won its first national trophies in 2008 at youth level, winning the under-14 development trophy 5–1 against Strathglass on 13 September 2008 in Fort William and the National U-12 Sixes in Drumnadrochit on 29 November 2008.

In 2009, the club reached its first senior semi-final, in the Bullough Cup, where they lost 4–2 to South Division One Champions, Lochside Rovers.

The club's achievements since establishment have been rewarded with recognition of the most talented young players in the international set-up as well as various awards from local organisations.

== Advent of second team ==
In 2011, which will mark the club's tenth anniversary, the club will be running two teams, with the first team moving up into South Division One despite only finishing second in South Division Two and a second team taking its place in South Division Two. The club also competed in the Camanachd Cup for the first time. After a venue change from Cannich, the 'Dour succumbed 5–0 to their more experienced opponents but attracted a record crowd of 150 to Silversands.

The club is now technically, in terms of teams entered into competition, the largest club in shinty. The club held a gala day to celebrate 10 years of shinty in the village in 2011. The club reached the Bullough Cup Final in 2011 but lost to Lochside Rovers 5–0 at Silversands. The final was hosted by Aberdour with the Oban side's agreement after the original venue in Rothesay, Bute was considered unplayable.

The club had an ignoble double of finishing bottom of both leagues it played in during the 2011 season. This may have had implications for the second team's existence as Aberdour's first team would have been relegated to South Division Two, with no place for the second team to go. However, Oban Camanachd was relegated from the Premier Division then its second team, Lochside Rovers, was relegated instead.

== Recent seasons (2012–present) ==
Aberdour's first team have begun to make progress in league and cup competitions. A now established team, they attract players with experience from other clubs who have settled in Edinburgh and Fife. Aberdour also won the Fingal Memorial Shield at the St. Andrew's Sixes in 2013, 2015, 2016 and 2017, and the Rosedearn Shield at the Inverness sixes in 2016. They will play their first senior finale in the South of Scotland plate in 2014.

In 2019 Aberdour won its first silverware, after topping the tables in South Division 1. This has led to its promotion to the National League and is unprecedented for a club of such a young age.

== Women's teams ==
Aberdour had their own team ladies team, before a merger with Forth Camanachd resulted in the club expanding to two teams, with seasoned internationalists coming into the Aberdour set-up. The strengthened Aberdour first team reached the final of the Valerie Fraser Cup in 2011. In recent seasons the club has consolidated to one women's side. Ironically, despite setting up the club, Lisa Norman plays for Glasgow Mid-Argyll's ladies team.
