= Tayforth Camanachd =

- Full name: Tayforth Camanachd
- Founded: 1973
- Ground: Peffermill, Edinburgh
- League: South Division Two
- 2025: 5th
Home	Away

Tayforth Camanachd is a shinty team, based at the University of Edinburgh grounds at Peffermill Playing Fields.

== History ==
Formed in Perth in 1973 by Barry Nesbitt and Father Eugene O'Sullivan, the club drew upon the number of Highlanders living in the Central Belt as well as the Irish community in Perth. Willie Dowds was another player associated with the club who helped to expand the game locally.

Fr. Eugene O'Sullivan, nicknamed the "shinty priest", appeared on the front page of the Daily Record in 1970 after being sent off for punching an opponent, a Kyles Athletic player. At times during the late 1970s and early 1980s, Hugh O'Kane was also part of the team.

The club reached the Camanachd Cup semi-final in 1988 and won the national Aviemore sixes in 1990.

The club narrowly missed out on promotion to South Division One in 2011 after a winner-takes-all game with Strachur. Due to the poor state of the pitch at the North Inch during the 2011 season, many games were played at Edinburgh East Lothian's old park, Levenhall Links. Tayforth made a move to Levenhall on a more continuous basis for the 2012 season.

In September 2015, the club won the Bullough Cup, a competition for reserves in the South Division 2. They retained the trophy in 2016 and later that year, the club finished at the top of South Division Two.

In 2019, after a period playing out of Musselburgh, the club relocated to Peffermill, Edinburgh.
