= Runrig discography =

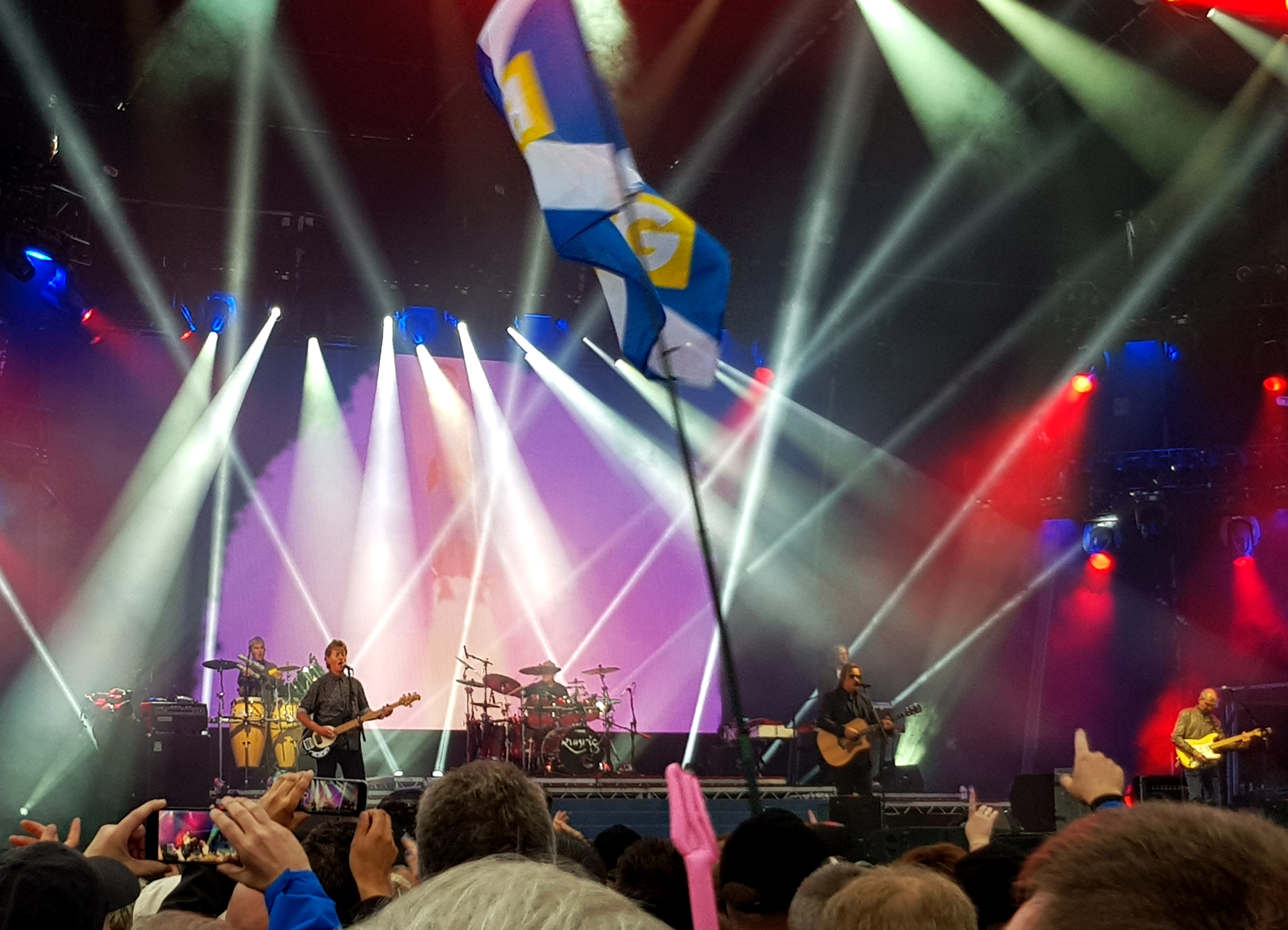
- Runrig performing live in Stirling, 2018
- Studio albums: 14
- Extended plays: 3
- Live albums: 8
- Compilation albums: 15
- Singles: 32
- Video albums: 10
- Box sets: 5

This is a comprehensive listing of the discography of Celtic rock group Runrig. They released their debut album, Play Gaelic, in April 1978, followed by the albums The Highland Connection (1979), Recovery (1981) and Heartland (1985). The band achieved moderate breakthrough commercial success in 1987 upon the release of The Cutter and the Clan, which yielded the singles "Worker for the Wind" / "Alba" and "Protect and Survive", which peaked just outside the Top 100 of the UK Singles Chart. "News from Heaven" was released as the lead single from their sixth album Searchlight (1989), which peaked at number ninety on the UK Singles Chart. Searchlight reached a peak of number eleven on the UK Albums Chart, and was certified Silver in the United Kingdom and marked the beginning of a period of commercial success for the band across Europe.

The early 1990s continued a period of success for the band, particularly in the British and German music markets. The Big Wheel (1991) and Amazing Things (1993) both reached the top five of the UK Albums Chart, whilst Amazing Things gave the band their debut appearance on the German Albums Chart following a peak position of number forty-seven. "Flower of the West" was released as the only single from The Big Wheel and peaked just outside the UK Top 40 Singles Chart, whilst "Wonderful" and "The Greatest Flame" which were the two singles to be released from Amazing Things gave the band their first appearance in the UK Top 40.

In 1996, Runrig released a cover version of "Rhythm of My Heart" by Rod Stewart which was included on their compilation album Long Distance. The single reached number twenty-four on the UK Singles Chart, and was followed by the release of a remixed version of "The Greatest Flame" which reached number thirty in the United Kingdom. Long Distance achieved considerable commercial success across Europe, reaching number thirteen in the United Kingdom, six in Denmark, sixty in Germany and number one in their native Scotland, whilst achieving both Gold certifications in the United Kingdom and Denmark. Their tenth studio album, In Search of Angels (1999), marked their final appearance in the UK Top 40 Albums Chart, peaking at number twenty-nine, until their fourteenth and final studio album, The Story (2016) peaked at number twenty-six. In 2007, a remixed version of "Loch Lomond" featuring the Tartan Army, entitled "Loch Lomond (Hampden Remix)" gave the band their only appearance in the Top 10 of the UK Singles Chart, peaking at number nine and achieving a Silver certification in the United Kingdom.

== Albums ==
=== Studio albums ===
Title	Album details	Peak chart positions						Certifications
Title	Album details	UK	UK Indie	DEN	GER	SCO	SWI	Certifications
Play Gaelic	Released: April 1978; Label: Neptune; Formats: LP, MC	—	—	—	—	—	—	
The Highland Connection	Released: 19 October 1979; Label: Ridge; Formats: LP, MC	—	—	—	—	—	—	
Recovery	Released: 1981; Label: Ridge; Formats: LP, MC	—	—	—	—	—	—	
Heartland	Released: 1985; Label: Ridge; Formats: CD, LP, MC	—	—	—	—	—	—	
The Cutter and the Clan	Released: 1 December 1987; Label: Ridge; Formats: CD, LP, MC	45 (Note: The Cutter and the Clan charted upon re-release in 1995.)	7	—	—	12 (Note: The Cutter and the Clan charted upon re-entry in 2024.)	—	UK: Silver
Searchlight	Released: 25 September 1989; Label: Chrysalis; Formats: CD, LP, MC	11	—	—	—	—	—	UK: Gold
The Big Wheel	Released: 10 June 1991; Label: Chrysalis; Formats: CD, LP, MC	4	—	—	—	—	—	UK: Gold
Amazing Things	Released: 15 March 1993; Label: Chrysalis; Formats: CD, LP, MC	2	—	—	47	—	—	UK: Silver
Mara	Released: 6 November 1995; Label: Chrysalis; Formats: CD, LP, MC	24	—	—	81	3	—	UK: Silver
In Search of Angels	Released: 1 March 1999; Label: Ridge; Formats: CD, MD	29	—	—	26	6	—	
The Stamping Ground	Released: 4 May 2001; Label: Ridge; Formats: CD	64	—	33	20	15	—	
Proterra (with Paul Mounsey)	Released: 25 August 2003; Label: Ridge; Formats: CD	84	—	16	10	12	—	
Everything You See	Released: 14 May 2007; Label: Ridge; Formats: CD	61	—	1	15	10	—	DEN: Platinum
The Story	Released: 29 January 2016; Label: Ridge; Formats: CD, 2xCD, 2xLP, digital download	26	4	2	6	4	51	
"—" denotes releases that did not chart or were not released in that territory.

=== Live albums ===
Title	Album details	Peak chart positions						Certifications
Title	Album details	UK	UK Indie	DEN	GER	SCO	SWI	Certifications
Once in a Lifetime	Released: 14 November 1988; Label: Chrysalis; Formats: CD, LP, MC	61	—	—	—	59 (Note: Once in a Lifetime charted on the Scottish Album Chart in 2004.)	—	UK: Gold
Transmitting Live	Released: 14 November 1994; Label: Chrysalis; Formats: CD, LP, MC	41	—	—	67	4	—	
Live at Celtic Connections 2000	Released: 28 August 2000; Label: Ridge; Formats: CD	168	—	—	48	43	—	
Day of Days	Released: 3 May 2004; Label: Ridge; Formats: CD	200	23	13	25	40	—	DEN: Gold
Year of the Flood	Released: May 2008; Label: Ridge; Formats: CD, CD+DVD	—	—	4	28	—	—	DEN: Gold
Party on the Moor	Released: 28 March 2014; Label: Ridge; Formats: 3xCD, 3xCD+2xDVD	51	10	4	6	6	—	
The Last Dance – Farewell Concert	Released: 16 August 2019; Label: RCA; Formats: 3xCD, 3xCD+2xDVD	27	—	7	1	1	—	
One Legend – Two Concerts Live at Rockpalast 1996 & 2001	Released: 30 October 2020; Label: MIG-Music; Formats: 4xCD+2xDVD	—	12	—	—	11	—	
"—" denotes releases that did not chart or were not released in that territory.

=== Compilation albums ===
Title	Album details	Peak chart positions					Certifications
Title	Album details	UK	UK Indie	DEN	GER	SCO	Certifications
Alba. The Best of Runrig	Released: June 1992; Label: Chrysalis; Formats: CD, MC	—	—	—	—	—	
The Best of Runrig – Long Distance	Released: 7 October 1996; Label: Chrysalis; Formats: CD, 2xCD, MC	13	—	6	60	1	UK: Gold; DEN: Gold
Beat the Drum	Released: 16 February 1998; Label: EMI Gold; Formats: CD, MC	—	—	—	—	93	
The Gaelic Collection (1973–1998)	Released: 11 May 1998; Label: Ridge; Formats: 2xCD	71	—	—	—	26	
The Runrig Collection	Released: January 1999; Label: EMI; Formats: CD	—	—	—	—	87	
Scotland's Pride – Runrig's Best	Released: 12 April 1999; Label: Chrysalis; Formats: CD	—	—	—	—	—	
BBC – The Archive Series	Released: 19 April 1999; Label: EMI; Formats: 2xCD	—	—	—	—	—	
Celtic Glory	Released: 25 October 1999; Label: Connoisseur Collection; Formats: CD	—	—	—	—	—	
Scotland's Glory – Runrig's Ballads	Released: 2000; Label: Ridge; Formats: CD	—	—	—	—	—	
30 Year Journey – The Best	Released: 29 March 2004; Label: Ridge; Formats: CD	—	—	1	38	67	DEN: Gold
The Essential	Released: 2007; Label: Capitol; Formats: CD	—	—	—	—	47	
The Collection	Released: February 2009; Label: EMI Gold; Formats: CD	—	—	—	—	—	
All the Best	Released: April 2012; Label: EMI; Formats: 2xCD	—	—	—	—	—	
Best of Rarities	Released: 1 June 2018; Label: RCA; Formats: 2xCD	—	—	—	—	67	
The Ones That Got Away	Released: 8 June 2018; Label: Ridge; Formats: CD	—	12	—	—	7	
"—" denotes releases that did not chart or were not released in that territory.

=== Box sets ===
Title	Album details	Peak chart positions				Certifications
Title	Album details	UK Indie	DEN	GER	SCO	Certifications
50 Great Songs	Released: November 2010; Label: Ridge; Formats: 3xCD+DVD	38	2	43	22	DEN: Gold
Stepping Down the Glory Road (The Chrysalis Years 1988–1996)	Released: July 2013; Label: Chrysalis; Formats: 6xCD	—	—	—	72	
Original Album Series	Released: 20 January 2014; Label: Chrysalis; Formats: 5xCD	—	—	—	—	
Rarities	Released: 1 June 2018; Label: RCA; Formats: 6xCD+3xDVD	—	—	—	—	
Original Album Classics	Released: 14 September 2018; Label: Sony Music; Formats: 5xCD	—	—	—	—	
"—" denotes releases that did not chart.

== EPs ==
Title	EP details	Peak chart positions
Title	EP details	UK
Capture the Heart	Released: September 1990; Label: Chrysalis; Formats: 10", 12", CD	49
Hearthammer	Released: 26 August 1991; Label: Chrysalis; Formats: 7",12", CD, MC	25
Flower of the West	Released: 28 October 1991; Label: Chrysalis; Formats: 12", CD	—
"—" denotes releases that did not chart.

== Singles ==
Title	Year	Peak chart positions			Certifications	Album
Title	Year	SCO	UK	GER	Certifications	Album
"Loch Lomond"	1982	—	86	—		Non-album single
"Dance Called America"	1984	—	—	—		Heartland
"Skye"	1984	—	108	—		Heartland
"The Work Song"	1986	—	—	—		Non-album single
"Worker for the Wind" / "Alba"	1987	—	—	—		The Cutter and the Clan
"Protect and Survive"	1988	—	110	—		The Cutter and the Clan
"News from Heaven"	1989	—	90	—		Searchlight
"Every River"	1989	—	129	—		Searchlight
"Flower of the West"	1991	—	43	—		The Big Wheel
"Wonderful"	1993	—	29	87		Amazing Things
"The Greatest Flame"	1993	—	36	—		Amazing Things
"Song of the Earth"	1993	—	—	—		Amazing Things
"This Time of Year"	1994	13	38	—		Non-album singles
"An Ubhal as Àirde (The Highest Apple)"	1995	3	18	—		Non-album singles
"Things That Are"	1995	9	40	—		Mara
"Rhythm of My Heart"	1996	10	24	—		The Best of Runrig – Long Distance
"The Greatest Flame" (remix)	1996	5	30	—		The Best of Runrig – Long Distance
"The Message"	1999	—	—	—		In Search of Angels
"Maymorning"	1999	47	90	—		In Search of Angels
"Big Sky"	1999	—	—	—		In Search of Angels
"This Is Not a Love Song"	1999	—	—	—		In Search of Angels
"Book of Golden Stories"	2001	—	191	—		The Stamping Ground
"Wall of China"	2001	—	—	—		The Stamping Ground
"Empty Glens"	2003	—	—	93		Proterra
"Clash of the Ash"	2007	—	110	—		Everything You See
"Loch Lomond" (Hampden remix; with the Tartan Army)	2007	1	9	—	UK: Silver	Non-album single
"Year of the Flood"	2008	—	—	—		Year of the Flood
"Road Trip"	2008	—	—	—		Year of the Flood
"And We'll Sing"	2013	—	—	—		Party on the Moor
"The Story"	2015	—	—	—		The Story
"The Years We Shared"	2016	—	—	—		The Story
"Somewhere" (featuring Julie Fowlis)	2018	—	—	—		The Ones That Got Away
"—" denotes releases that did not chart or were not released in that territory.

== Videos ==
Title	Album details	Peak chart positions	
Title	Album details	UK	SWI
City of Lights	Released: November 1990; Label: Chrysalis/PolyGram Video; Formats: VHS	7	—
Wheel in Motion	Released: 24 August 1992; Label: Picture Music International; Formats: VHS	1	—
Live at Stirling Castle – Donnie Munro's Farewell	Released: November 1997; Label: PolyGram Video; Formats: VHS	6	—
Live in Bonn	Released: 17 January 2000; Label: Ridge; Formats: VHS	28	—
Day of Days	Released: 3 May 2004; Label: Ridge; Formats: DVD	7	—
Air an Oir	Released: July 2005; Label: Ridge; Formats: DVD	—	—
Year of the Flood	Released: May 2008; Label: Ridge; Formats: DVD	1	—
Party on the Moor	Released: 28 March 2014; Label: Ridge; Formats: 2xDVD, Blu-ray	—	5
The Last Dance – Farewell Concert	Released: 16 August 2019; Label: RCA; Formats: 2xDVD, Blu-ray	1	2
There Must Be a Place	Released: 29 October 2021; Label: Sony Music; Formats: DVD & Blu-ray	2	—
"—" denotes releases that did not chart or were not released in that territory.

== Fan club releases ==
A series of Access All Areas releases of live and other archive material were available via the band's official fan club - these include both CD and DVD releases.

Year	Title	Format	Notes
2001	Access All Areas Volume 1	CD	
2002	Access All Areas Volume 2	CD	
2002	Access All Areas Volume 3	CD	
2003	Access All Areas Volume 4	CD	
2004	Access All Areas Volume 5	CD	
2004	Access All Areas Volume 6	DVD	Promo video collection and live tracks
2005	Access All Areas Volume 7	CD	
2006	Access All Areas Volume 8	DVD	"Mod for Rockers" - 1987 TV broadcast
2006	Access All Areas Volume 9	CD	
2008	Access All Areas Volume 10	CD	
2011	Access All Areas Volume 11	CD	
2012	Access All Areas Volume 12	DVD	Miscellaneous live tracks
