= List of Gaelic songs by Runrig =

Runrig was a six-piece folk rock band from Scotland. They sang about one quarter of their songs in Scottish Gaelic. Following is a list of these, by album.

== Play Gaelic ==
- Dùisg Mo Rùn
- Sguaban Arbhair
- Tillidh Mi
- Griogal Cridhe
- Nach Neònach Neisd a' tha E
- Sunndach
- Air an Tràigh
- Dè Nì Mi
- An Ròs
- Chì Mi'n Geamhradh
- Cum 'ur n'Aire

== The Highland Connection ==
- Gamhna Gealla
- Mairi
- Fichead Bliadhna
- Na H-uain A's T-earrach
- Foghar Nan Eilean
- Cearcal A' Chuain

== Recovery ==
- An Toll Dubh
- Rubh Nan Cudaigean
- 'Ic Iain 'Ic Sheumais
- Fuaim A' Bhlair
- Tir An Airm

== Heartland ==
- O Cho Meallt
- Air A' Chuan
- Cnoc Na Feille
- An Ataireachd Àrd

== The Cutter And The Clan ==
- Alba
- An Ubhal As Airde

== Searchlight ==
- Tir A' Mhurain
- Siol Ghoraidh

== The Big Wheel ==
- Abhainn An T-sluaigh
- An Cuibhle Mòr

== Amazing Things ==
- Pòg Aon Oidhche Earraich
- Sràidean Na Roinn-Eorpa
- Àrd

== Mara ==
- Meadhan Oidhche Air An Acairseid
- Thairis Air A' Ghleann

== In Search Of Angels ==
- Ribhinn Donn
- Da Mhile Bliadhna
- A' Dh'innse Na Firinn
- Cho Buidhe Is A' Bha I Riabh

== The Stamping Ground ==
- An Sabhal Aig Niall
- Oran Ailein
- Oran

== Proterra ==
- An Toll Dubh
- Faileas Air An Airigh
- A' Reiteach

== Everything You See ==
- An Dealachadh
- Sona

== The Story ==
- Onar
- An-Diugh Ghabh Mi Cuairt
