= Day of Days (album) =

Live album by Runrig
- Released: 3 May 2004
- Recorded: 23 August 2003
- Venue: Stirling Castle
- Genre: Celtic rock
- Length: 1:17:15
- Label: Ridge Records

Runrig chronology
Proterra (2003)	Day of Days (2004)	Everything You See (2007)

Day of Days is a live album by Scottish Celtic rock band Runrig. The event at Stirling Castle celebrated their 30th anniversary, the band having been formed in 1973.

== Track listing ==
1. "Going Home" – 1:49
2. "Hearthammer" – 5:09
3. "Protect and Survive" – 5:07
4. "Big Sky" – 7:41
5. "Hearts of Olden Glory" – 4:57
6. "Sìol Ghoraidh" (The Genealogy of Goraidh) – 5:53
7. "Proterra" – 5:26
8. "Running to the Light" – 5:02
9. "The Stamping Ground" – 5:49
10. "Maymorning" – 10:41
11. "Faileas air an Àirigh" (Shadow on the Shieling) – 4:41
12. "Book of Golden Stories" – 3:37
13. "Day of Days" – 3:18
14. "All the Miles" – 3:43
15. "A Rèiteach" (The Betrothal) – 4:30

The album includes tracks from seven different studio albums:

- The Highland Connection (1979): "Going Home"
- The Cutter and the Clan (1987): "Protect and Survive" and "Hearts of Olden Glory"
- Searchlight (1989): "Sìol Ghoraidh"
- The Big Wheel (1991): "Hearthammer"
- In Search of Angels (1999): "Big Sky" and "Maymorning"
- The Stamping Ground (2001): "Running to the Light", "The Stamping Ground", and "Book of Golden Stories"
- Proterra (2003): "Proterra", "Faileas air an Àirigh"', "Day of Days", "All the Miles", and "A Rèiteach"
