= Scottish music (1980–1989) =

During the 1980s, Scottish music featured post-punk bands exemplified by Simple Minds and Josef K, and bands like Runrig that remained closer to the Scottish dance music tradition. Folk rock or Celtic rock bands launched in the 1980s included The Waterboys and The Proclaimers. Among the folk singers of the time were Dick Gaughan and Bill Drummond, and Ewan MacColl who died in 1989.

== Recordings ==
- 1980 "Home Is Where the Van Is" (Battlefield Band)
- 1981 "Recovery" (Runrig)
- 1981 "Smiddyburn" (Dave Swarbrick)
- 1981 "Handful of Earth (Dick Gaughan)
- 1981 "All About You" (Scars)
- 1982 "The Story So Far" (Battlefield Band)
- 1982 "There's a Buzz" (Battlefield Band)
- 1982 "New Gold Dream 81-82-83-84 (Simple Minds)
- 1982 "The Missionary" (Josef K)
- 1982 "Time Bandits" Passionate Friends
- 1983 "Passionate Friends" Passionate Friends
- 1984 "Anthem for the Common Man" (Battlefield Band)
- 1985 "Heartland" (Runrig)
- 1985 "To Welcome Paddy Home" (The Boys of the Lough)
- 1985 "This Is the Sea" (The Waterboys)
- 1985 "Don't You (Forget About Me)" (Simple Minds)
- 1986 "On the Rise" (Battlefield Band)
- 1986 "The Man" Bill Drummond
- 1987 "The Cutter And The Clan (Runrig)
- 1987 "Farewell and Remember Me" (The Boys of the Lough)
- 1987 "Raintown" (Deacon Blue)
- 1987 "This Is the Story" (The Proclaimers)
- 1988 "Perfect" (Fairground Attraction)
- 1988 The First of a Million Kisses (Fairground Attraction)
- 1988 "Music in Trust Vol. 2" (Battlefield Band)
- 1988 "When the World Knows Your Name" (Deacon Blue)
- 1988 "Sunshine on Leith" (The Proclaimers)
- 1989 "Searchlight" (Runrig)
