= Once in a Lifetime (Runrig album) =

Live album by Runrig
- Released: 1988
- Recorded: 1988
- Genre: Celtic rock
- Length: 46:16
- Label: Chrysalis
- Producer: Chris Harley

Runrig chronology
The Cutter and the Clan (1987)	Once in a Lifetime (1988)	Searchlight (1989)

Professional ratings
Review scores
Source	Rating
AllMusic	link

Once in a Lifetime is a live album by Scottish Celtic rock band Runrig. It was released in 1988.

A review from AllMusic called it one of the best live albums ever: "Capturing the band in its best milieu – live – Once in a Lifetime is arguably one of the ten best live albums ever, if the test of a live album is the effect a band has on its audience that particular night. Alternately exhilarating and soul-stirring, its highlight is a rendition of "Loch Lomond" that has to be heard to be believed."

== Track listing ==
1. "Dance Called America" – 5:08
2. "Protect and Survive" – 4:16
3. "Chì Mi'n Geamhradh" ("I See The Winter") – 4:09
4. "Rocket to the Moon" – 5:01
5. "Going Home" – 4:20
6. "Cnoc Na Fèille" ("The Hill at the Market Stance") – 5:23
7. "'S Tu Mo Leannan" ("You Are My Love") / Nightfall on Marsco – 3:26
8. "Skye" – 6:03
9. "Loch Lomond" – 6:24
10. "Hearts of Olden Glory" – 2:14

== Personnel ==
- Iain Bayne – drums
- Malcolm Jones – electric guitar, vocals
- Calum MacDonald – percussion, vocals
- Rory Macdonald – bass guitar, vocals
- Donnie Munro – lead vocals, acoustic guitar
- Peter Wishart – keyboards
