= Maymorning =

Single by Runrig

from the album In Search of Angels
- B-side: "Rocket To The Moon (Live)"
- Released: 1999
- Studio: Castlesound Studios, Edinburgh, Scotland
- Label: Ridge Records (UK); Columbia Records (Europe)
- Songwriter(s): C. Macdonald; R. Macdonald
- Producer(s): Calum Malcolm

Runrig singles chronology
"The Message" (1999)	"Maymorning" (1999)	"Big Sky" (1999)

"Maymorning" is a 1999 single released by Scottish celtic rock band Runrig, released as the second single from their tenth studio album In Search of Angels (1999). Its release was preceded by the single "The Message". Written by Rory MacDonald and Calum MacDonald, it was released via Ridge Records in the United Kingdom, and by Columbia Records across continental Europe. The release of the single marked one of the first releases of new lead singer for the band, Bruce Guthro, following the departure of original lead singer Donnie Munro.

Commercially, "Maymorning" marked the last appearance of Runrig within the UK Top 100 Singles Charts for eight years, until the release of "Loch Lomond (Hampden Remix)" in 2007, which debuted at number one in their native Scotland, and number nine in the United Kingdom. "Maymorning" debuted at number ninety on the UK Singles Charts in May 1999, remaining on the charts in the United Kingdom for one week. It fared better in their native Scotland, debuting at number forty-seven on the Scottish Singles Charts.

== Background ==
"Maymorning" was written as an example of renewal and environmental consciousness, a common theme in Runrig songs with many featuring themes of agriculture, land conservation and religion. The following lyrics from "Maymorning" are credited as an example of land renewal and environmental consciousness.

I’m alive again on a Maymorning
Going to wipe the slate clean
Follow my dreams
All the yearning buds are here again
With the promise of a new life to come
Spring is here again

== Promotion ==
To promote the release of "Maymorning", Runrig appeared on Monikas Musikkrog to perform the song along with "This Is Not A Love Song". The band later performed the song during their Rockpalast appearance on 28 August 1999 in Rehinufer, Bonn, Germany, which was later released on VHS format entitled Live In Bonn.

== Track listing ==
=== CD single (UK) ===
1. "Maymorning" (edit) – 4:04
2. "Rocket to the Moon" (live) – 5:16
3. "Maymorning" (album version) – 5:44

=== CD single (Europe) ===
1. "Maymorning" (edit) – 4:04
2. "The Water Is Wide" (live) – 5:32
3. "Feasgar An Là" – 1:56
4. "Maymorning" (album version) – 5:44

== Chart performance ==
Chart (1999)	Peak position
Scotland (OCC)	47
UK Singles (OCC)	90
