= Live at Celtic Connections 2000 =

Live album by Runrig
- Released: 2000
- Recorded: 25 January 2000
- Venue: Glasgow Royal Concert Hall
- Genre: Celtic rock
- Length: 80:55
- Label: Ridge Records
- Producer: John Morrison, Anita Morrison

Runrig chronology
In Search of Angels (1999)	Live at Celtic Connections 2000 (2000)	The Stamping Ground (2001)

Live at Celtic Connections 2000 is a live album by Scottish Celtic rock band Runrig. It marked their first appearance at Celtic Connections, a Scottish music festival which takes place annually in Glasgow during the month of January.

== Track listing ==
1. "Rocket to the Moon" – 8:39
2. "Protect and Survive" – 4:18
3. "Big Sky" – 7:28
4. "Sìol Ghoraidh" ("The Genealogy of Goraidh") – 6:52
5. "The Only Rose" – 5:24
6. "A Dh'innse na Fìrinn" ("To Tell You the Truth") – 5:29
7. "Edge of the World" – 5:36
8. "Hearts of Olden Glory" – 4:45
9. "Rubh nan Cudaigean" ("Cuddy Point") / "The Middleton Mouse" – 3:17
10. "Maymorning" – 5:50
11. "The Message" – 5:32
12. "Cearcall a' Chuain" ("The Ocean Circle") – 3:14
13. "Pòg Aon Oidhche Earraich" ("A Kiss One Spring Evening") – 4:26
14. "Skye" – 10:05

== Personnel ==
Runrig

- Iain Bayne – drums
- Bruce Guthro – vocals, acoustic guitar
- Malcolm Jones – guitars, bagpipes, piano accordion, vocals
- Calum Macdonald – percussion, vocals
- Rory Macdonald – bass guitar, vocals, acoustic guitar
- Pete Wishart – keyboards

== Chart performance ==
Chart (2000)	Peak position
German Albums (Offizielle Top 100)	48
Scottish Albums (OCC)	43
