= Transmitting Live =

Live album by Runrig
- Released: 1994
- Recorded: 1993–1994
- Genre: Celtic rock
- Length: 60:08
- Label: Chrysalis

Runrig chronology
Amazing Things (1993)	Transmitting Live (1994)	Mara (1995)

Transmitting Live is a 1994 live album by the Scottish Celtic rock band Runrig.

== Track listing ==
1. "Ùrlar" (Floor) – 2:10
2. "Àrd" (High) – 6:11
3. "Edge of the World" – 5:13
4. "The Greatest Flame" – 6:18
5. "Harvest Moon" – 6:11
6. "The Wire" – 6:13
7. "Precious Years" – 2:36
8. "Every River" – 2:48
9. "Flower of the West" – 6:39
10. "Only the Brave" – 4:34
11. "Alba" (Scotland) – 6:17
12. "Pòg Aon Oidhche Earraich" (A Kiss One Spring Evening) – 5:04

== Charts ==
Chart performance for Transmitting Live
Chart (1994–1995)	Peak position
German Albums (Offizielle Top 100)	67
UK Albums (OCC)	41
