= Richard Cherns =

Richard Cherns is a Scottish musician, composer and music director. His work spans theatre, film and popular music, and he is best known for his involvement in Scottish rock and theatre music from the late 1970s to the 1990s. His credits include work as a composer, keyboardist and guitarist.

== Career ==
=== Early career ===
During the 1970s, Cherns composed music for theatre including the Clerwood Theatre Company and Theatre Workshop. He performed with The Medium Wave Band and other groups, including Finn MacCuill, establishing his early reputation as a performer and composer.

=== Runrig ===
From 1981 to 1986, Cherns was a member of the Scottish Celtic rock band Runrig, serving as the group’s keyboardist. During this period, he contributed to several recordings, including the album Heartland(1985). He left the band in 1986 after five years and was succeeded by Pete Wishart.

=== Theatre ===
In 1981, Cherns co-founded Theatre Alba with theatre director Charles Nowosielski. The Edinburgh based company, which dissolved in 2018, produced and promoted new Scottish plays by Scottish authors incorporating Scottish traditional music, staged plays in the Scots language and encouraged new Scottish writing. Cherns served as the company’s composer and musical director, writing and directing much of the music for its productions.

From 1986, Cherns worked with Nowosielski as resident musical director and composer at the Brunton Theatre in Musselburgh, contributing scores for a wide range of theatrical productions. In 1991, he took on the same roles at the Lyric Theatre in Belfast, where he worked until 1993.

=== Recorded works ===
In addition to his theatre work, Cherns has performed, arranged or composed music for a number of studio recordings, including:

- Rocky Roads by Avalon
- Coming Home by Fiona Kennedy
- On the West Side by Donnie Munro
- Garden Boy by Donnie Munro
- Heartland by Runrig
- The soundtrack to the 1997 film adaptation of Macbeth
