= 10 Great Songs =

10 Great Songs may refer to:

- 10 Great Songs, a 2009 compilation album by the musical artist Pat Benatar
- 10 Great Songs, a 2010 compilation album by the musical artist Jethro Tull
- 10 Great Songs, a 2011 compilation album by the musical artist Selena
- 10 Great Songs, a 2009 compilation album by The Beach Boys, later reissued under the 20th Century Masters album series

== See also ==
- 50 Great Songs
