= Màiri MacInnes (singer) =

Gaelic Singer

Màiri MacInnes (Scottish Gaelic: Màiri NicAonghais) is a Scottish vocalist who sings primarily in Scottish Gaelic. She was born in South Uist, an island in the Outer Hebrides of Scotland. Gaelic was only language she spoke at home, with MacInnes only learning English at school.

== Career ==
In 1982, MacInnes won the gold medal at the Royal National Mòd. and went on to win the 1983 Pan Celtic Festival in Killarney, Ireland. She sang Gaelic vocals on a track on Runrig's Heartland album in 1985 and appeared in the BBC adaptation of The Shutter Falls in 1986. Her debut album, Causeway, was released in 1989.

MacInnes has been a presenter on Gaelic television, working on programmes for BBC Scotland, STV, and Grampian Television. These have included Brag, Dotaman, Siudan, Trang-Trang, Na Daoine Beaga, and Orain 's Rannan.

MacInnes' second album, This Feeling Inside, was released in 1995 and featured the Llangwm Male Welsh Voice Choir. After the album's release, she performed with the choir and the BBC Philharmonic Orchestra at St David's Hall in Cardiff.

She sang William Jackson's "Land of Light," winning the Glasgow Herald's New Song for the Millennium competition, and performed it at the Edinburgh Military Tattoo in 2000. Her third album, Orosay, was released in 2001, followed by Tickettybo in 2002. MacInnes performed at the Celtic Connections music festival in 2011.

In 2015, she released her album Gràs and recorded the theme song for the film Whisky Galore! in the same year. MacInnes performed with the BBC Scottish Symphony Orchestra at Celtic Connections in 2019.

In 2018, she performed her composition Tha ar n-ainm ard air Meinhein as part of the show Far Far from Ypres, commemorating the centenary of the end of World War I. MacInnes was inducted into the Traditional Music Hall of Fame in 2019. In 2020, she featured in a BBC Alba documentary on Beethoven's links to Gaelic music. She also appeared in BBC Alba's Mòd coverage in 2023.

MacInnes teaches Gaelic song at the Royal Conservatoire of Scotland and has taught in Scotland, the United States, and Canada. She lives in Scotland.

== Discography ==
- Causeway (1989)
- This Feeling Inside (1995)
- Orosay (2001)
- Tickettyboo (2002)
- Gràs (2015)
