= The Cutter and the Clan =

Studio album by Runrig
- Released: 1 December 1987
- Recorded: REL / Palladium Studios, Edinburgh, Scotland
- Genre: Celtic rock
- Length: 37:32
- Label: Ridge / Chrysalis
- Producer: Chris Harley

Runrig chronology
Heartland (1985)	The Cutter and the Clan (1987)	Searchlight (1989)

The Cutter and the Clan is the fifth studio album by Scottish Celtic rock band Runrig. Released on 1 December 1987, it was the band's breakthrough album, taking them from cottage industry to the international stage. Initially, it peaked at number seven on the UK Independent Albums Chart in 1988, however, a re–release in 1995 saw it debut at number forty-five on the UK Albums Chart as well as a debut appearance of number thirty one on the Scottish Albums Chart. A further re–release in 2024 saw it reach a new peak in their native Scotland of number twelve.

It was also the first Runrig album to feature keyboard player Pete Wishart – forming the "classic" line-up of the band through what would be their most commercially successful period. A 1995 re–release produced the single "An Ubhal as Àirde (The Highest Apple)", which made history by becoming the first song to be performed in Scottish Gaelic to chart in the United Kingdom.

== Background and release ==
The Cutter and the Clan features Donnie Munro on lead vocals, Rory Macdonald providing additional vocals and harmonies, as well as bass, Calum Macdonald provides backing vocals and performs percussion, Malcolm Jones contributed guitars, bagpipes and mandolin to the arrangements, with Iain Bayne on drums and percussion and Peter Wishart on keyboards and additional backing vocals. The band were joined by several session musicians for the recording of the album, including additional backing vocals provided by Kim Beacon, Chris Harley and Ann Turner, with Dougie Stevenson being credited for pedal steel contributions, John Martin for fiddle and Rab Howatt for additional guitar contributions.

The bands first four albums – Play Gaelic (1978), The Highland Connection (1979), Recovery (1981) and Heartland (1985), failed to have any impact on national charts, leading the band to part ways with two record companies in the process – Neptune Records and Ridge Records. Eight out of the ten tracks on The Cutter and the Clan had lyrics in English, and the album had material dealing with Gaels who had moved away from Scotland to the new world.

Originally, The Cutter and the Clan was recorded on the band's own Ridge label, it was taken on board by Chrysalis Records as part of a 1987 major recording contract which heralded a string of hit albums that would last until the mid-1990s with singer Donnie Munro's departure from the band a decade later. The release of The Cutter and the Clan marked their first release by Chrysalis Records. It was later re–released in 2001 as part of a 3 CD box set, released by EMI Records, alongside The Big Wheel and Amazing Things, and again, this time part of a five CD box set in 2014. In 2024, The Cutter and the Clan the album was remastered, printed, and pressed entirely in Scotland, and released through original record label for its initial release, Chrysalis.

== Promotion ==
During the albums initial release period in 1987, Runrig appeared on Mod For Rockers which was broadcast on STV. The performance was recorded on 4 August 1987. Two singles were released from the album during its initial release in 1987 – "Worker for the Wind" / "Alba" (1987) and "Protect and Survive" which just missed the UK Top 100 by ten places. For the 1995 re–release and with their popularity growing, Runrig performed "An Ubhal An Airde" on Top of the Pops on BBC, broadcast on 4 May 1995. Additionally, the band appeared on The Rock That Doesn't Roll on STV, broadcast on 27 August 1995.

"Protect and Survive" was released in August 1988 as the second and final single from The Cutter and the Clan. It was released via the bands own independent record label, Ridge. Runrig featured on the Channel 4 programme Playing For Your Country on 4 January 1993. A spokesperson for the band claimed that the television exposure will hopefully gather new fans for the band, particularly in England, and upon hearing songs like "Protect and Survive" will then "become intrigued once they see and hear what Runrig are like". It peaked at 110 on the UK Singles Charts.

The 1995 re–release of The Cutter and the Clan was preceded by the release of "An Ubhal as Àirde (The Highest Apple)" in 1995, which was later to become the first and only Scottish Gaelic language song to reach the UK Top 20, reaching #18 in 1995, following its use in an advert for Carlsberg lager.

== Commercial performance ==
Upon its original release in 1987, the album followed a similar trend to the bands previous albums in which it failed to chart on any national albums chart. It did, however, peak at number seven on the Independent Albums Charts in the United Kingdom. In 1995, following its re–release on the back of the bands popularity, the album debuted at number forty-five on the UK Albums Charts, where it remained for two weeks. The Cutter and the Clan was certified Silver by the BPI in the United Kingdom in 1995, seven years following its original release. In their native Scotland, it reached a peak of thirty one on the Scottish Albums Charts, again, in 1995 upon its re–release. In August 2024, The Cutter and the Clan re–entered the albums charts in their native Scotland at number twelve.

== Track listing ==
All songs written by Calum Macdonald and Rory Macdonald.

1. "Alba" – 4:02
2. "The Cutter" – 3:51
3. "Hearts of Olden Glory" – 2:14
4. "Pride of the Summer" – 3:59
5. "Worker for the Wind" – 3:30
6. "Rocket to the Moon" – 4:59
7. "The Only Rose" – 3:51
8. "Protect and Survive" – 3:23
9. "Our Earth Was Once Green" – 4:01
10. "An Ubhal as Àirde (The Highest Apple)" – 3:47

== Chart performance ==
Chart (1988)	Peak position
UK Independent Albums (Official Charts)	7

Chart (1995)	Peak position
UK Albums (Official Charts)	45
Scottish Albums (Official Charts)	31

Chart (2024)	Peak position
Scottish Albums (Official Charts)	12
UK Independent Albums (Official Charts)	43

=== Certifications ===
- United Kingdom (BPI) – Silver

== Personnel ==
Runrig

- Iain Bayne – drums, percussion
- Malcolm Jones – guitars, pipes, mandolin
- Calum Macdonald – percussion
- Rory Macdonald – vocals, bass guitar, guitar, accordion
- Donnie Munro – lead vocals
- Peter Wishart – keyboards
