= The Band from Rockall =

Scottish Gaelic music band

- Origin: Scotland
- Genres: Rock, folk, Gaelic music
- Years active: 2012-present
- Label: Universal Music
- Members: Calum Macdonald; Rory Macdonald
- Website: www.thebandfromrockall.co.uk

The Band from Rockall is a Gaelic music band from the Scottish Hebrides, consisting of songwriters Calum and Rory Macdonald.

== History ==
The duo's name comes from Rockall, a remote rocky uninhabited islet in the North Atlantic Ocean, lying 300 miles west of the Scottish mainland. This was chosen by the Macdonald brothers as a point halfway between their native North Uist and the United States, representing both the Gaelic tradition and the rock and roll influence on their music. The Band from Rockall served as a side project during a break in the schedule of brothers' full time band Runrig.

They released the album The Band from Rockall: The Solo Project from Calum and Rory Macdonald in 2012, which reached no. 13 on the Danish album chart. The album contains both English and Gaelic lyrics.
