= Play Gaelic =

Studio album by Runrig
- Released: April 1978
- Recorded: May 1977
- Studio: Black Gold, Kirkintilloch
- Genre: Scottish folk
- Length: 47:15
- Language: Scottish Gaelic
- Label: Neptune
- Producer: Ken Andrew, Ian McCredie

Runrig chronology
Play Gaelic (1978)	The Highland Connection (1979)

Play Gaelic is the first album by the Scottish Celtic rock band Runrig. It was released in 1978 on LP and cassette tape by Neptune Records. The album was re-released in 1990 by Lismor Records, Neptune's parent company, with different cover art. This release included a CD version of the album for the first time.

The album is sung entirely in Scottish Gaelic and is notable as one of the first contemporary albums to use the language and as an early part of the late 20th century revival in Gaelic language and culture. It is considered important in the development of Gaelic contemporary music, opening the possibility of producing modern music entirely in the language. It is the only one of the band's studio albums to be written exclusively with Gaelic lyrics.

== Background ==
Although Runrig were formed in 1973, brothers Calum and Rory MacDonald had begun writing songs from as early as 1971. Initially their song writing was in English, but a performance by Gaelic vocalist Angus MacLeod in 1972 inspired Calum to write his first Gaelic composition, "Air an Traigh", a song which features on Play Gaelic. After first performing as a band with accordion player Blair Douglas at a Glasgow cèilidh in early 1973, the "Run-Rig Dance Band" began playing dances on Skye later in the year. Performing only in English at this point, the band played mainly "Scottish country dance tunes" interspersed with cover versions of songs such as "Whiskey in the Jar" and "Red River Rock".

Vocalist Donnie Munro joined the band, by then performing as Run Rig, the following summer, and when Blair Douglas left the band later in the year accordion player Robert MacDonald joined, playing with the band for the first time in December 1974. During 1975 and 1976 Campbell Gunn also sung with the band, sometimes replacing Munro during live performances.

Despite performing only in English, Calum continued to write some Gaelic lyrics. In October 1975 one of his compositions, "Sguaban Arbhair", won second place in a Gaelic songwriting competition organised by BBC Scotland, although the version performed at the contest by Mary Sandeman was markedly different to the original. The track appears on Play Gaelic, and Calum, now joined by Rory, began to write more Gaelic language material. A demo tape was sent to The Corries but was rejected before being accepted by Lismor Records, with a recording date set for May 1977. Gunn, who had had a contractual dispute with Lismor in the past, left the band before recording began.

== Style ==
The band's sound on the album is halfway between traditional cèilidh music and pastoral folk as opposed to the harder rock which would characterise their next album The Highland Connection. With all of the songs written in Scottish Gaelic, the playing on the album has been described as combining "plaintive accordion, jangly acoustic guitar and truly Marvinesque electric guitar", and as "gentle, folksy, [and] tentative". Despite lacking finesse in terms of both production and playing, the songs are considered to have "a real emotive power", with "memorable" melodies on songs such as the album's opening track "Dùisg Mo Rùn".

The album includes some traditional songs, including the historic "Criogal Cridhe" and a set of dance hall instrumental tunes named as "Ceòl an Dannsa", described on the album liner notes as "Friday night and the lights are on in the village hall". "Dè Nì Mi", written by Finlay Morrison, is described as a "a humorous puirt à beul from North Uist", and "An Ròs" is an adaptation of a poem by Mòrag Montgomery from A' Choille Chiar, a collection of poems Montgomery and her sister Catrìona published in 1974. Calum MacDonald's song writing on the album has been described as "excellent", with the album's final track "Cum 'ur n'Aire" described as "a hypnotic, orchestral whole" with layered vocal harmonies.

Several of the songs are now part of the Gaelic songbook: "Tillidh Mi" is a fixture at fèisean and has been recorded by bands such as Skipinnish and Mànran, "Air an Tràigh", which Calum MacDonald had considered offering to Na h-Òganaich during the 1970s, has been recorded by Trail West and is a staple of the band's live performances, "Cum 'ur n'Aire" is a favourite at the National Mòd, and "Chì Mi'n Geamhradh" was the title track of a 1991 Cathy-Ann MacPhee album and has been recorded by artists such as Rura, Duncan Chisholm, and, in Manx, by Ruth Keggin.

"Tillidh Mi" was a finalist in the Celtavision song contest at the 1977 Pan Celtic Festival in Killarney and Runrig performed some of material which would go on to feature on Play Gaelic on BBC One Scotland's Se Ur Beatha light entertainment programme during the same year. During 1978 and 1979 the band featured in Grampian Television children's series Cuir Car, playing a number of the songs from the album as well as other material and featuring in sketches. A version of "Dè Nì Mi" provided the opening theme music for Can Seo, a programme for Gaelic learners produced by BBC One Scotland in 1979.

== Recording ==
Lismor Records, which was run by Peter Hamilton, were known for recording traditional music and pipe bands. These records were usually produced quickly, often in a single day. Runrig were offered six days to record Play Gaelic but, after a series of difficult negotiations, this was increased to 12 days, the longest recording session Lismor had used to this point.

The album was recorded in May 1977 at Black Gold Studios in Kirkintilloch where it was produced by owners Ken Andrew and Ian McCredie, both members of Middle of the Road. The band had suggested that Chris Harley produce the album, but this was rejected by Lismor; Harley produced a number of the band's albums in the 1980s and 90s. The album was released the following April on Neptune Records, a subsidiary of Lismor.

== Critical reception ==
Runrig first played a number of the songs recorded for Play Gaelic during their summer 1977 concerts. Audiences, which had been used to the band playing dance music and cover versions, did not initially respond well to the Gaelic songs. Gradually the new songs grew more popular. The BBC had launched Radio Highland in 1976, broadcasting a series of opt-outs from BBC Radio Scotland aimed at both English and Gaelic language listeners. Play Gaelic was played regularly by the station, presenter Iain MacDonald recalling that "Runrig were the only people in [the Gaelic music] market who were appealing to anything like a youth audience" and that, as a result, the album "got battered to death", so much so that vinyl copies became unplayable.

Although the head of Radio Highland, Bill Kerracher, disliked the album, referring to it as "American music with Gaelic words", contemporary Scottish reviews of Play Gaelic were generally positive. Writing in The Scotsman, critic Alistair Clark felt the album provided an example of how Gaelic music could become contemporary "without losing either its significance or dignity" and found the album "irresistible". Aonghas MacNeacail of the West Highland Free Press gave the album a "rave review", writing that he felt the album "thoroughly contemporary" and the band "the first Gaelic rock band". Writing a year later in the Glasgow Herald, Douglas Lowe described the album simply as "good", although others, including Jim Hardie and Neil Campbell of The Electric Ceilidh Band, reacted less positively to the album.

Commercially Play Gaelic sold 6,000 copies, enough for the band to consider it a success, and retrospective views of it tend to focus on its importance as the first contemporary all-Gaelic album to be considered successful. It has been described as "seminal", and Iain MacDonald stresses the importance of the album in terms of making it possible to play contemporary music with Gaelic vocals, despite initial "real resistance ... from the Gaelic establishment". Broadcaster Martin MacDonald was "knocked sideways" by the album which he considers was "so completely and utterly different it was disturbing". In Tom Morton's opinion the album "doesn't sound like rock music at all" and lacks the attack provided by contemporary bands such as Horslips or Fairport Convention, but despite its "incredibly dated" sound, highlights the importance of the album and in particular the "power" of the album's closing track "Cum 'ur n'Aire" with its message about the importance of preserving identity.

Cum ur cum ur cum ur n'aire
Air an iar 's air an àite
a dh' fhàg sibh
'S cuimhnich cuimhnich
gu robh agaibh
Dualchas àraid agus luachmhor ann

Keep, keep your awareness
On the west and on the place
That raised you
Remember, remember. Never forget
That you left behind
A culture that was special and of worth

— "Cum 'ur n'aire", Calum and Rory MacDonald, Isa Music, 1978

The album's liner notes describe "Cum 'ur n'Aire" as the song that "probably sums up the whole point of the album", and the importance of the band singing in their own language and about their own identity is highlighted by Iain MacDonald who was of the view that the band became a "political instrument" due to their use of the language. A contemporary conversation with Martin MacDonald also stressed the political importance of using Gaelic lyrics, with MacDonald reported as saying that the band did not necessarily need to become overtly political as "you are political by the mere fact that you exist". The album was released at the start of what the Glasgow Herald later described as "the first true revival in Gaeldom since Culloden", with the band's music in the "forefront" of a "resurgence in Celtic awareness".

Play Gaelic's liner notes describe Runrig's members as having "always believed that the Gaelic language should progress from its traditional roots and develop like any other significant living tongue", a sentiment which the Glasgow Herald suggested in 1983 did not "mess about". The Scottish Traditional Music Hall of Fame considers Runrig "an inspiration to a generation of singers and musicians growing up in the Gàidhealtachd" and that their songs from this era provided music that "young Gaels could relate to", and when a Fringe event was added to the National Mòd in 1978 in an attempt to appeal to younger audiences, Runrig were one of the main attractions, with Calum MacDonald also included alongside journalists and writers on a literary panel. Reflecting on the album in 1983, however, Calum was of the view that because he was "refinding" his Gaelic, the lyrics on Play Gaelic were "not as good as [they] should be in a literary sense".

== Track listing ==
Side 1
No.	Title	Writer(s)	Length
1.	"Dùisg Mo Rùn" (Awaken my love)	Calum MacDonald	3:43
2.	"Sguaban Arbhair" (The sheaves of corn)	Calum MacDonald	4:05
3.	"Tillidh Mi" (I will return)	Calum MacDonald	3:36
4.	"Criogal Cridhe" (Beloved Gregor)	Traditional (arranged by Rory MacDonald)	4:37
5.	"Nach Neònach Neisd A Tha E" (Isn't it strange now)	Calum MacDonald	3:59
6.	"Sunndach" (Joyous)	Words: Calum MacDonald; Music: Rory MacDonald	3:46
Total length:			23:46

Side 2
No.	Title	Writer(s)	Length
1.	"Air an Tràigh" (On the strand)	Calum MacDonald	2:42
2.	"Dè Nì Mi and Puirt" (What will I do and Tunes)	Dè Nì Mi: Finlay Morrison; Puirt: Traditional (arranged by Rory MacDonald)	4:05
3.	"An Ròs" (The rose)	Words: Morag Montgomery; Music: Rory MacDonald	3:57
4.	"Ceòl an Dannsa" (Dance music) (a) "The Brolum" (b) "Irish Reel" (c) "Reel of Tulloch"	Traditional (arranged by Rory MacDonald)	2:34
5.	"Chì Mi'n Geamhradh" (I see the winter)	Words: Calum MacDonald; Music: Rory MacDonald	5:14
6.	"Cum 'ur n'Aire" (Keep aware (Note: The Glasgow Islay Gaelic Choir's recording of Cum 'ur n'Aire on their album Tribute to Runrig, translates the title as "Remember Your Roots". The liner notes for Play Gaelic add "never lose sight of your culture and identity" after the song's listing.))	Words: Calum MacDonald; Music: Rory MacDonald	6:11
Total length:			23:29

== Personnel ==
Runrig

- Donnie Munro – vocals, 12-string guitar
- Rory MacDonald – acoustic, electric and bass guitars, backing and harmony vocals (Note: On liner notes for the Neptune Records LP release, Rory MacDonald is also credited with having played piano accordion on the album. On Lismor Records versions of the liner notes he is not credited with having played the instrument on the album.)
- Robert MacDonald – piano accordion
- Calum MacDonald – drums

Following the release of the album, Robert MacDonald left the band, unwilling to commit to a more full-time approach. Blair Douglas rejoined for a time as the band's accordion player, although he left before the recording of The Highland Connection in 1979. Guitarist Malcolm Jones also joined the band, remaining in the line-up for the rest of Runrig's career.

== Bibliography ==
- Morton, Tom (1991) Going Home: the Runrig story. Edinburgh: Mainstream Publishing. ISBN 1-85158 411 0
