= Wheel in Motion =

Live concert video by the Scottish Celtic rock band Runrig

Wheel In Motion is a 1992 live concert video by the Scottish Celtic rock band Runrig. It shows footage from the 1991 Loch Lomond concert, and various others from the tour of the same year. Originally released on VHS in 1992, it was remastered onto DVD in 2000.

== Track listing ==
1. Always The Winner
2. Solus Na Madainn (The Morning Light)
3. Healer In Your Heart
4. Every River
5. Harvest Moon
6. Hearthammer
7. Abhainn An T-Sluaigh (The Crowded River)
8. Headlights
9. Edge Of The World
10. Alba (Scotland)
11. Instrumental
12. An Cuibhle Mòr (The Big Wheel)
13. I'll Keep Coming Home
14. Tear Down These Walls
15. Pride Of The Summer
16. Flower Of The West
17. Loch Lomond
18. This Beautiful Pain
