= Every River (Runrig song) =

Single by Runrig

from the album Searchlight
- B-side: "This Time Of Year"
- Released: 13 November 1989
- Studio: Castlesound Studios, Edinburgh, Scotland
- Label: Chrysalis – CHS 3451
- Producer(s): Richard Manwaring

Runrig singles chronology
"News from Heaven" (1988)	"Every River" (1989)	"Flower of the West" (1991)

"Every River" is a 1989 single released by Scottish celtic rock band Runrig, released on 13 November 1989 as the second and final single from their sixth studio album Searchlight (1989). It was released via Chrysalis.

It failed to match the commercial success of its predecessor "News from Heaven", missing the UK Top 100 Singles Charts, peaking at number one hundred and twenty-nine.

== Track listing ==
=== Vinyl, 7", 45 RPM, single (UK) ===
1. "Every River" (Producer – Richard Manwaring)
2. "This Time of Year" (Producer – Pete Wingfield)

=== CD single (UK) ===
1. "Every River" (Producer – Richard Manwaring)
2. "This Time of Year" (Producer – Pete Wingfield)
3. "Our Earth Was Once Green" (live)

== Chart performance ==
Chart (1989)	Peak position
UK Singles (OCC)	129
