= Year of the Flood =

2007 live concert album by Runrig

DVD cover

Year of the Flood is the DVD and CD of Runrig's Beat the Drum open air concert on 18 August 2007, filmed at Borlum Farm near Drumnadrochit on the shores of Loch Ness.

It was the band's flagship event of Highland 2007, a series of cultural events to celebrate Highland culture and also seen as the realisation of growing desires to play a large open-air show in the Highlands, somewhat in commemoration to the legendary Loch Lomond open air concert of 1991, one of the undisputed highlights of the band's career.

On the night before the concert, after a long period of dry weather, rain set in and lasted throughout the day, at times as torrential downpour. This transformed the festival grounds and its car park into a veritable mud hole, evoking memories of the famous Woodstock festival 38 years earlier, and ironically fitted the name "Year of the Flood" of the first song of Runrig's new studio album Everything You See, which had just been released in May. The festival started at around 1400 BST with supporting acts Vatersay Boys, Aberfeldy, Julie Fowlis, Great Big Sea, Wolfstone and the Red Hot Chilli Pipers. At around 2000 BST the audience of 17,000 people were asked to please drop their umbrellas so that the upcoming Runrig gig could be recorded for a DVD.

== Track listing ==
DVD

1. "Intro Music" (2:20)
2. "Year of the Flood" (4:21)
3. "Pride of the Summer" (4:22)
4. "Road Trip" (5:09)
5. "Proterra" (6:17)
6. "The Ocean Road" (6:27)
7. "An Toll Dubh" (2:45)
8. "Sona" (4:04)
9. "The Engine Room" (4:22)
10. "Every River" (5:21)
11. "A Reiteach/Drums" (6:10)
12. "In Scandinavia" (6:05)
13. "Clash of the Ash" (4:53)
14. "Skye" (8:40)
15. "Hearts of Olden Glory" (5:30)
16. "Something's Got to Give" (3:48)
17. "Protect and Survive" (5:39)
18. "On the Edge" (2:55)
19. "Loch Lomond" (7:36)

Credits: Book of Golden Stories/An Dealachadh (3:12)

CD

1. "Intro Music" (2:05)
2. "Year of the Flood" (4:21)
3. "Pride of the Summer" (4:22)
4. "Road Trip" (5:09)
5. "Proterra" (6:17)
6. "The Ocean Road" (6:27)
7. "Sona" (4:04)
8. "The Engine Room" (4:22)
9. "Every River" (5:21)
10. "In Scandinavia" (6:05)
11. "Clash of the Ash" (4:53)
12. "Hearts of Olden Glory" (5:30)
13. "Something's Got to Give" (3:48)
14. "Protect and Survive" (5:39)
