= Griogal Cridhe =

Griogal Cridhe (literally "Gregor of the Heart", or "Beloved Gregor") is a traditional Scottish lament and lullaby that was composed in Gaelic by Mór Chaimbeul ("Marion Campbell"), the widow of Griogair Ruadh Mac Griogair ("Gregor the Red MacGregor") (1541–1570), the chief of the Clan MacGregor of Glen Strae, who was executed at Taymouth Castle, Perthshire, on 7 April 1570.

== Lyrics ==
There are many versions of the lyrics (the untranslated words are vocables):

'S iomadh h-oidhche fhliuch is thioram
Sìde na seachd sian
Gheibheadh Griogal dhomhsa creagan
Ris an gabhainn dian

Chorus:
Obhan obhan obhan iri
Obhan iri, o!
Obhan obhan obhan iri
'S mór mo mhulad, 's mór

Dhìrich mi dh ´an t-seòmar mhullaich,
´S theirinn mi ´n tigh-làir,
´S cha d ´fhuair mise Griogal cridhe
´Na shuidhe mu ´n chlàr.

Eudail mhóir a shluaigh an Domhain,
Dhòirt iad d´ fhuil o ´n-dé,
´S chuir iad do cheann air stob daraich
Tacan beag bho d´ chré.

’S ged tha mi gun ubhlan agam,
’S ubhlan uil’ aig càch;
’S ann tha m’ ubhal cùbhraidh grinn,
'S cùl a chinn ri lar.

B ´annsa bhi le Griogal cridhe
Teàrnadh chruidh le gleann,
Na le Baran mór na Dalach,
Sìoda geal mu m´ cheann.

´Nuair a bhios mnàthan òg a´ bhaile,
´Nochd nan cadal sèimh,
´S ann bhios mis´ air bruaich do lice,
´Bualadh mo dhà làimh.

Many a night both wet and dry
Weather of the seven elements
Gregor would find for me a rocky shelter
Which I would take eagerly.

Chorus:
Obhan, Obhan, Obhan iri
Obhan iri O!
Obhan Obhan Obhan iri,
Great is my sorrow, great.

I climbed into the upper chamber
And lay upon the floor
And I would not find my dearest Gregor
At the table in his place.

Great darling of the World's people
They spilt your blood yesterday
And they put your head on an oaken stake
Near where your body lay.

Though now I have no apples,
And others have them all,
My own apple, fragrant, handsome –
And the back of his head on the ground.

I would be glad to be with dear Gregor
Guarding cattle in the glen
Instead of with the great Baron of Dalach,
White silk around my head.

While the young wives of the town
Serenely sleep tonight
I will be at the edge of your gravestone
Beating my two hands.
