= The Story (Runrig album) =

Studio album by Runrig
- Released: 29 January 2016
- Recorded: 2014 – 2015
- Studio: Glo-Worm recording (Glasgow, Scotland); The Old Mill (Strathaven, Scotland); Stirling Rock School (Stirling, Scotland)
- Genre: Celtic rock
- Length: 48:22
- Label: Ridge Records
- Producer: Brian Hurren

Runrig chronology
Everything You See (2007)	The Story (2016)

The Story is the fourteenth and final studio album by the Scottish rock band Runrig, released on 29 January 2016 on Ridge Records. The album spawned two singles – "The Story" and "The Years We Shared".

== Release and performance ==
The album was released on 29 January 2016 via Ridge Records in the United Kingdom, and via Sony Music Entertainment in Germany and REO in Denmark. Its highest charting position was in Denmark, where it reached number two on the Danish Albums Charts. In Germany, it also reached the top ten, peaking at number six on the German Albums Charts and spending a total of four weeks on the German charts. In their native Scotland, it debuted at number four on the Scottish Albums Chart, and debuted at number twenty-six in the United Kingdom. In Switzerland, it spent one week on the Swiss Albums Charts, peaking at number fifty one.

== Promotion ==
The lead single, also titled "The Story", was released in November 2015. To promote the release of the album, a sizeable UK and Europe-wide tour was announced including a trademark Edinburgh Castle summer concert along with headlining the 21st HebCelt Festival on the Isle of Lewis.

The release of The Story marked the final studio album released by the band, announcing that following the release of their fourteenth album, the band would disband to pursue other projects. They later stated that it "was not the end" for the band, later announcing a "farewell" tour, concluding in Stirling entitled The Last Dance in 2018.

== Composition ==
The final track, "Somewhere", includes a tribute to astronaut Laurel Clark, who died in the 2003 Space Shuttle Columbia disaster. The song ends with a recording of her voice. Clark was a Runrig fan and had a wake up call with Runrig's "Running to the Light". She took a copy of their album The Stamping Ground into space with her. When the shuttle exploded the CD was found back on Earth, and was presented to the band by her family.

== Track listing ==
No.	Title	Length
1.	"The Story"	5:24
2.	"Onar"	5:37
3.	"Rise and Fall"	6:07
4.	"Elegy"	1:26
5.	"Every Beating Heart"	3:51
6.	"The Years We Shared"	3:43
7.	"When the Beauty"	3:25
8.	"18 July"	5:26
9.	"An-Diugh Ghabh Mi Cuairt"	3:55
10.	"The Place Where the Rivers Run"	4:10
11.	"Somewhere"	5:18

== Charts ==
Chart (2016)	Peak position
Danish Albums (Hitlisten)	2
German Albums (Offizielle Top 100)	6
Swiss Albums (Schweizer Hitparade)	51
UK Albums (OCC)	26
UK Album Downloads (OCC)	24
UK Independent Albums (OCC)	4
Scottish Albums (OCC)	4
