= The Big Wheel (album) =

Studio album by Runrig
- Released: 10 June 1991
- Studios: Castlesound, Pencaitland, Scotland
- Genre: Celtic rock
- Length: 51:30
- Label: Chrysalis
- Producer: Chris Harley

Runrig chronology
| Searchlight (1989) | The Big Wheel (1991) | Amazing Things (1993) |

The Big Wheel is the seventh studio album by the Scottish Celtic rock band Runrig, released on 10 June 1991. The album peaked at No. 4 on the UK Albums Chart. It was certified Silver by the British Phonographic Industry (BPI), before being certified Gold on 1 September 1991, indicating record sales in excess of 100,000 copies. It spawned only one single, "Flower of the West", which reached number forty-three on the UK Singles Charts.

== Release and promotion ==
The album was released on 10 June 1991 via Chrysalis Records and was released in the United Kingdom, Greece, Canada, Japan as well as mainland continental Europe. In 2001, the album was re–released as part of a 3 CD boxset was released including The Cutter and the Clan and Amazing Things, and again as part of a 3 CD boxset alongside The Cutter and the Clan in 2002. In 2014, it was again re–released, this time as part of a five CD box set which included four other studio albums released by the band.

To promote the release of the album, the band appeared on Brag broadcast on BBC Two Scotland which documented the recording and rehearsal sessions of The Big Wheel. On 6 September 1991, Runrig performed "Hearthammer" on Top of the Pops on BBC One and their concert, Runrig On The Rock, was broadcast that same year on STV.

== Recording ==
During the recording sessions for The Big Wheel, the band were joined by several session musicians in the studio, mostly for backing vocals. Lorna Bannen, Ann Turner, Colin Chisholm, Patrick Logan and Chris Harley accompanied Runrig during the recording sessions for the album, providing backing vocal arrangements on several of the albums tracks.

== Critical reception ==
Professional ratings
Review scores
| Source | Rating |
|---|---|
| Calgary Herald | B |

The Kitchener-Waterloo Record wrote that "Donnie Munro's vocals drive the songs, but Iain Bayne's superbly produced drums power the band itself." The Calgary Herald labelled the album "an inoffensive, watered-down brand of Celtic rock... Uninspiring but professional."

== Track listing ==
All songs written by Calum Macdonald and Rory Macdonald.

1. "Headlights" - 5:09
2. "Healer in Your Heart" - 5:34
3. "Abhainn an t-Sluaigh" (The Crowded River) - 5:17
4. "Always the Winner" - 5:41
5. "This Beautiful Pain" - 4:15
6. "An Cuibhle Mòr" (The Big Wheel) - 6:07
7. "Edge of the World" - 5:00
8. "Hearthammer" - 4:27
9. "I'll Keep Coming Home" - 2:33
10. "Flower of the West" - 6:36

== Chart performance ==
=== Charts ===
| Chart (1991) | Peak position |
|---|---|
| UK Albums (Official Charts) | 4 |

=== Certifications ===
| Region | Certification | Certified units/sales |
|---|---|---|
| United Kingdom (BPI) | Gold | 100,000^{^} |
^{^} Shipments figures based on certification alone.

== Personnel ==
Runrig

- Iain Bayne - drums, percussion
- Malcolm Jones - guitars, banjo, accordion
- Calum Macdonald - percussion
- Rory Macdonald - bass guitar, vocals
- Donnie Munro - lead vocals
- Peter Wishart - keyboards

== Singles ==
=== "Flower of the West" ===
"Flower of the West"

Single by Runrig

from the album The Big Wheel
- B-side: "Ravenscaig"
- Released: 28 October 1991
- Studio: Castlesound, Edinburgh, Scotland
- Label: Chrysalis – CHS 3451
- Producer: Chris Harley

Runrig singles chronology
| "Every River" (1989) | "Flower of the West" (1991) | "Wonderful" (1993) |

"Flower of the West" is the only single from the album, released on 28 October 1991. It became the highest-charting entry for the band on the UK Singles Charts, following its peak at number forty-three.

"Flower of the West" features an "intensely emotional evocation of a micro-historical landscape", as described by the National Museums Scotland. AllMusic said that "Flower of the West concludes The Big Wheel "in typical grandiose Runrig fashion".

==== Commercial performance ====
The release of "Flower of the West" brought Runrig the closest they had been to entering the UK Top 40 Singles Charts, after the song debuted at number forty-three in the United Kingdom. It spent a total of two weeks within the UK Top 100 Singles Charts, falling to number forty-seven in its second and final week, before falling out of the chart.

==== Track listing ====
===== CD, EP, single (UK) =====
1. "Flower of the West" – 4:55
2. "Ravenscraig" – 4:30
3. "Chì Mi'n Geamhradh" (featuring Karen Matheson) – 4:12
4. "Harvest Moon" (Live at Loch Lomond)

===== Vinyl, 7", 45 RPM, single (Germany) =====
1. "Flower of the West" – 4:55
2. "Chì Mi'n Geamhradh" (featuring Karen Matheson) – 4:12
