= In Search of Angels =

Studio album by Runrig
- Released: 21 February 1999
- Recorded: CaVa Studios, Glasgow, Scotland
- Genre: Celtic rock
- Length: 55:08
- Label: Ridge
- Producer: Chris Harley

Runrig chronology
| Mara (1995) | In Search of Angels (1999) | The Stamping Ground (2001) |

In Search of Angels is the tenth studio album released by Scottish Celtic rock band Runrig. It was released on 1 March 1999 via Ridge Records, the first release by the band since leaving their previous record label Chrysalis. Additionally, the album marks the first release featuring new lead singer Bruce Guthro, following the departure of original lead vocalist Donnie Munro in 1997. The album spawned four singles – "The Message", "Maymorning", "Big Sky" and "This Is Not a Love Song".

== Background and release ==
The album marked the first album released and recorded by the band following the departure of longtime lead vocalist Donnie Munro who left Runrig in 1997 to pursue a career in politics. Canadian singer–songwriter Bruce Guthro replaced Munro and became lead vocalist in 1998 after the band searched for a new singer.

The album was released on 1 March 1999, becoming the first release by the band under their new record label, Ridge Records, following their departure from Chrysalis Records. It was released in the United Kingdom by Ridge, and by Columbia Records in mainland continental Europe and by CMC in Denmark. In 2018, Sony Music Entertainment re–released the album as part of a 5 CD boxset in Germany.

The album contains songs in both English and Gaelic, the latter being sung by the band's bassist Rory MacDonald as Guthro isn't a native Gaelic speaker.

== Recording ==
Bruce Guthro performed vocals for the first time during the recording sessions of In Search of Angels, after he joined Runrig the year previous, following the departure of Donnie Munro in 1997 who left the band in order to seek a career in politics. Guthro, aged 36 at the time of joining the band, was a country singer from Nova Scotia, as was spotted on video by the band's manager Marlene Ross's son. Her son was instantly impressed by Guthro's "Canadian style Celtic music" and voice, and upon returning to Scotland with the video, it was shown to his mother who began to advocate for Guthro becoming the new vocalist for the band.

The band made contact with Guthro in Canada to invite him to Scotland to perform with the band in order to get a better feel of Guthro and to make a decision whether he was right to join the band as lead vocalist. The band were impressed by Guthro, and later recruited him as lead vocalist for the band. Following the announcement, the band's manager said "I know I speak for all the band when I say how delighted and excited I am to have Bruce on board". She later claimed she "had been looking for someone very special, with a magical voice and charisma, and it was all there, albeit on the other side of the Atlantic". The band's manager said that "the searching process took longer than we had hoped, but we knew we had to find the best for our fans. I truly believe we have".

== Musicians ==
During the recording sessions for In Search of Angels, the band were joined by BT String Ensemble, conducted by Ross Campbell, with backing vocals provided by Holly Thomas, Brett Perkins, Colin Chisholm, Peter Rowan, Tom Urie, Marj Hogarth, Joanne Ramsay, Gordon McKeeve, Michel Bryne and Norman Mackinnon. Sando Cianco provided percussion, whilst both Chris Harley and Robin Rankin provided keyboards.

== Track listing ==
1. "Maymorning" - 5:44
2. "The Message" - 5:19
3. "Rìbhinn Donn" (Brown Haired Girl) - 3:58
4. "Big Sky" - 6:34
5. "Life Is - 4:01
6. "Dà Mhìle Bliadhna" (Two Thousand Years) - 4:40
7. "This Is Not a Love Song" - 5:25
8. "A Dh'innse na Fìrinn" (To Tell You the Truth) - 4:47
9. "All Things Must Change" - 4:15
10. "Cho Buidhe Is A Bha I Riabh" (As Yellow As It Ever Was) - 4:02
11. "Travellers" - 2:59
12. "In Search of Angels" - 3:32

== Chart performance ==
Chart performance for Amazing Things
| Chart (1999) | Peak position |
|---|---|
| German Albums (Offizielle Top 100) | 26 |
| UK Albums (OCC) | 29 |
| Scottish Albums (OCC) | 6 |

== Personnel ==
Runrig

- Iain Bayne - drums, percussion
- Bruce Guthro - lead vocals
- Malcolm Jones - guitars, accordion
- Calum Macdonald - percussion
- Rory Macdonald - vocals, bass guitar
- Peter Wishart - keyboards
