= Heartland (Runrig album) =

Studio album by Runrig
- Released: 1985
- Recorded: Castlesound Studios, Pencaitland, Scotland
- Genre: Celtic rock
- Length: 50:47
- Label: Ridge
- Producer: Chris Harley

Runrig chronology
Recovery (1981)	Heartland (1985)	The Cutter and the Clan (1987)

Heartland is the fourth album by Celtic rock band Runrig. It was released in 1985, and was their first output in which English songs exceeded the number of Gaelic ones.

It was the band's final album to feature keyboardist Richard Cherns, who would be replaced by Pete Wishart for the following album.

== Track listing ==
1. "O Cho Meallt" (Much Deception) – 3:04
2. "This Darkest Winter" – 4:29
3. "Lifeline" – 4:09
4. "Air a' Chuan" (On the Ocean) – 5:09
5. "Dance Called America" – 4:33
6. "The Everlasting Gun" – 4:26
7. "Skye" – 3:31
8. "Cnoc na Fèille" (The Hill at the Marketplace) – 4:40
9. "The Wire" – 5:28
10. "An Ataireachd Àrd" (The High Swell) – 4:30
11. "The Ferry" – 4:12
12. "Tuireadh Iain Ruaidh" (Lament for Red John) – 2:42

== Personnel ==
Runrig

- Iain Bayne – drums, percussion
- Richard Cherns – keyboards
- Malcolm Jones – guitars, mandolin, bass guitar, vocals
- Calum MacDonald – percussion
- Rory MacDonald – vocals, bass guitar, accordion, twelve-string guitar
- Donnie Munro – lead vocals

Guest artists

- Màiri MacInnes – Gaelic vocal
- Chris Harley – keyboards, harmonies
- Les Lavin – keyboards
