= The Highland Connection =

Studio album by Runrig
- Released: October 1979
- Recorded: June 1979
- Studio: Castlesound Studios, Edinburgh; Castlesound Studios, Pencaitland
- Genre: Scottish folk; Celtic rock
- Length: 42:18
- Language: Scottish Gaelic; English
- Label: Ridge
- Producer: Runrig

Runrig chronology
Play Gaelic (1978)	The Highland Connection (1979)	Recovery (1981)

Professional ratings
Review scores
Source	Rating
AllMusic	3/5 stars

The Highland Connection is the second album by Celtic rock band Runrig. It was released in 1979 on LP and cassette tape as the first release from Ridge Records, the record company set up by the band to release their material. A CD version of the album was released on the same label in 1989.

The majority of the album is sung in Scottish Gaelic, but it includes instrumentals and the first songs recorded by the band in English, including a version of "Loch Lomond", a song that became a live staple for the rest of the band's career.

== Background ==
Formed in 1973, Runrig had released their first album, Play Gaelic, in 1978. Despite an initial lack of enthusiasm amongst live audiences for the Gaelic language songs on the album, the album had received generally positive reviews and the band had been featured on Gaelic language television broadcasts, broadening their appeal. The "gentle, folksy" album had sold 6,000 copies by 1979, enough to convince the band that there was potential in continuing to produce music written mainly in Scottish Gaelic.

Following the release of Play Gaelic in April 1978, accordion player Robert MacDonald had left the band, unwilling to commit to a more full-time basis. He was replaced by Blair Douglas, a founder member of the band who had left in 1974 and had been playing accordion with The Electric Cèilidh Band. Guitarist Malcolm Jones, aged 17, also joined the band at this time. Douglas was a driving force within the band during the summer of 1978, helping with early arrangements for songs such as "What Time" and "Gamhna Gealla" which appear on The Highland Connection. Early demos were recorded at Ça Va Studios in Glasgow and the band played at the first National Mòd fringe in Oban later in the year, to "enthusiastic acceptance".

Ultimately Douglas left the band again in January 1979, although he returned occasionally and played as a guest musician on the band's next album Recovery. Runrig continued with four members, with a commitment being made to write and record another album. After their unsatisfactory experience recording Play Gaelic with Lismor Records, they borrowed £8,000 and founded their own record company, Ridge Records, in order to produce The Highland Connection.

== Recording ==
By the spring of 1979, the band's principle songwriters Calum and Rory MacDonald had written enough songs to begin to rehearse material for what was to become The Highland Connection. Guitarist Malcolm Jones contributed some instrumental numbers for the album, and, using the money they had borrowed, Runrig booked time at Castlesound Studios in Edinburgh for June. The studio's owner Calum Malcolm was unable to attend recording sessions as he was touring with his band The Headboys, and as a result the recordings were self-produced, with Castlesound's engineer Phil Yule providing technical advice.

Recording continued throughout the summer of 1979, moving to Castlesound's studio at Pencaitland, a studio which would later be used regularly by the band. The aim was to release the new record in time for the 1979 National Mòd which was to be held in October at Stornoway, the first time the event had been held in the Western Isles, a bastion of the Gaelic language. Runrig had been booked to play a series of shows at the Seaforth Hotel in the town and the Mòd, with its focus on Gaelic music and culture, was seen as the ideal venue at which to launch the new album. Working to a tight deadline, the album was released in October 1979, in time for their appearance at the Mòd. To save time, the cover photography was shot on Arthur's Seat in Edinburgh rather than in the Highlands.

== Track listing ==
Side 1
No.	Title	Writer(s)	Length
1.	"Gamhna Gealla" (White stirks)	Traditional (arranged by Runrig)	3:38
2.	"Màiri"	Calum MacDonald, Rory MacDonald	2:56
3.	"What Time"	Malcolm Jones	2:30
4.	"(a) Fichead Bliadhna (Twenty years) (Note: Fichead Bliadhna includes a narrated passage of the recollections of Catrìona Nic-a-Phì (English: Catherine MacPhee) of Aird Mhor, Iochdar on South Uist adapted from Carmina Gadelica, volume III collected by Alexander Carmichael.)" "(b) Na Luing air Seòladh (The ships having sailed)"	Calum MacDonald, Rory MacDonald; Malcolm Jones	5:23; 2:27
5.	"Loch Lomond"	Traditional (arranged by Runrig)	5:02
Total length:			21:56

Side 2
No.	Title	Writer(s)	Length
1.	"Na h-Uain a's t-Earrach" (The lambs in spring time)	Calum MacDonald, Rory MacDonald, Malcolm Jones	3:28
2.	"Foghar nan Eilean '78" (Island autumn)	Calum MacDonald, Rory MacDonald	3:15
3.	"The Twenty-Five Pounder"	Malcolm Jones	2:22
4.	"Going Home"	Calum MacDonald, Rory MacDonald	3:49
5.	"Morning Tide"	Calum MacDonald, Rory MacDonald	4:41
6.	"Cearcal a' Chuain" (The ocean's cycle)	Calum MacDonald, Rory MacDonald	2:47
Total length:			20:22

== Personnel ==
Runrig

- Donnie Munro – vocals
- Malcolm Jones – guitars, mandolin, highland bagpipes, the goose, percussion, harmony vocals
- Rory MacDonald – bass guitar, guitar, piano accordion, string machine, organ, vocals
- Calum MacDonald – drums, percussion, narration, backing vocals

Technical personnel

- Runrig – producers
- Phil Yule – engineer

== Bibliography ==
- Morton, Tom (1991) Going Home: the Runrig story. Edinburgh: Mainstream Publishing. ISBN 1-85158 411 0
