= Amazing Things (Runrig album) =

Studio album by Runrig
- Released: 15 March 1993
- Studio: Castlesound Studios, Pentcaitland, Scotland
- Genre: Celtic rock
- Length: 57:40
- Label: Chrysalis
- Producer: Chris Harley

Runrig chronology
The Big Wheel (1991)	Amazing Things (1993)	Mara (1995)

Amazing Things is the eighth studio album by the Scottish Celtic rock band Runrig, released on 11 March 1993 by Chrysalis Records. It spawned a total of three singles – "Wonderful", "The Greatest Flame" and "Song of the Earth".

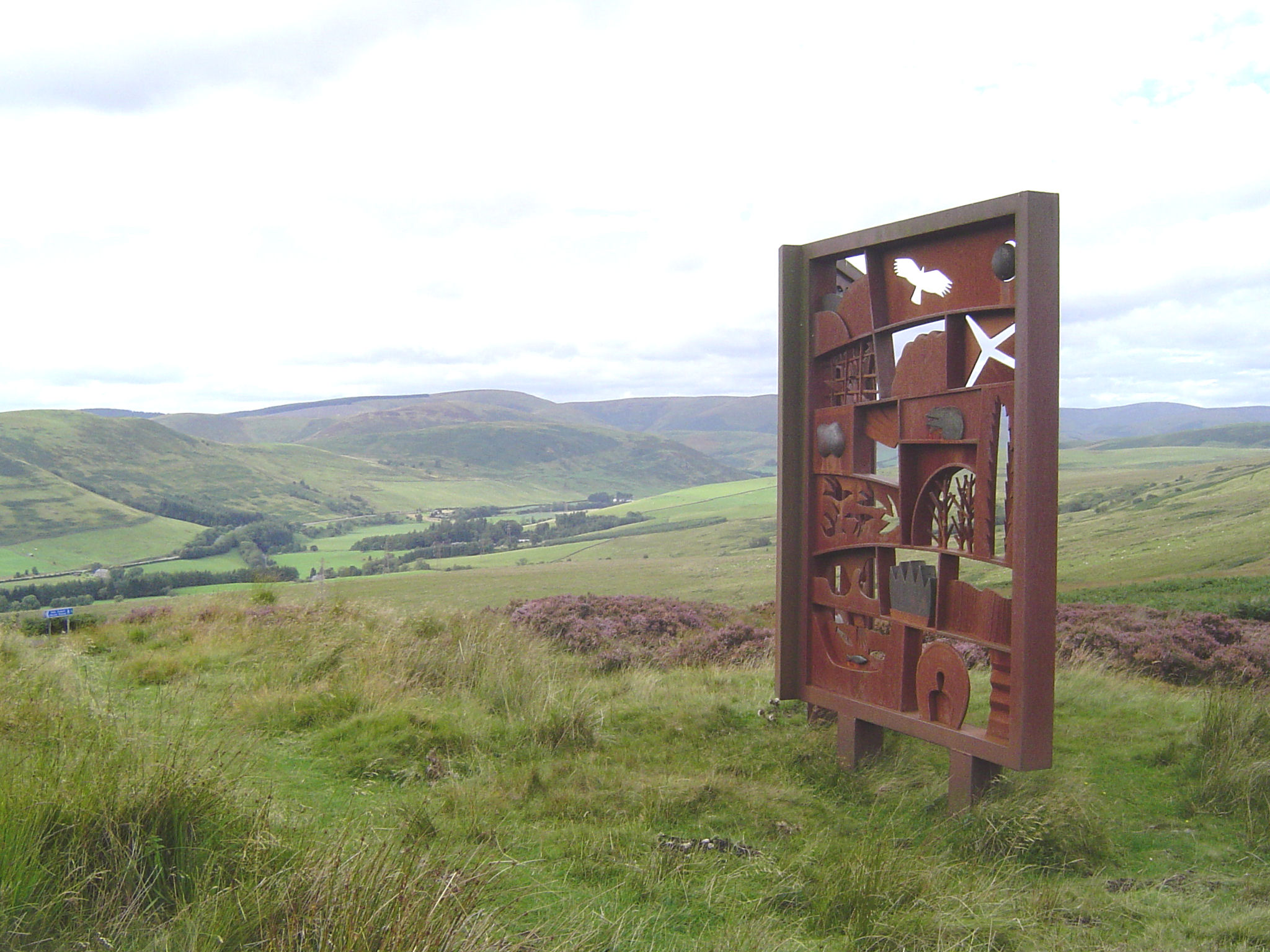
The cover features a close-up photo of the Hugh MacDiarmid Memorial near Langholm created by sculptor Jake Harvey.

== Release and promotion ==
The album Amazing Things was released on 11 March 1993 by Chrysalis Records. It was released by the record label in the United Kingdom, Japan and mainland continental Europe. In 2001, the album was re–released in a packaged 3 CD boxset alongside The Cutter and the Clan and The Big Wheel, and again in 2014 as part of a 5 CD boxset alongside four other studio albums released by the band.

Following its release, Amazing Things debuted at number two in the United Kingdom, behind only Their Greatest Hits by Hot Chocolate. It became the highest charting entry for Runrig in the United Kingdom. Additionally, it debuted at number forty-seven in Germany, remaining within the Top 100 of the German Albums Charts for a total of eleven weeks. It was later certified Silver by the British Phonographic Industry (BPI), indicating sales in excess of 60,000 copies.

== Recording ==
The album was recorded by the band at Castlesound Studios in Pentcaitland, Scotland. For the recording sessions of the album, Runrig was joined by a number of session musicians to accompany the band for the recording of the album. Singer Marie Brennan provided both vocals and backing vocals on the album, with further backing vocals provided by Dee Brennan, Bridin Brennan, Olie Brennan, Mary Kiani, Lorna Bannen, Martin Piggot and Chris Harley.

The band was also accompanied by The Glasgow Islay Gaelic Choir, conducted by Kirsteen Grant, alongside The Breakish Horns, who provided bass material during the recording sessions.

== Album cover ==
The cover features a close-up photo of the Hugh MacDiarmid Memorial, near Langholm, created by sculptor Jake Harvey.

== Critical reception ==
Professional ratings
Review scores
Source	Rating
AllMusic	3.5/5 stars
Calgary Herald	B
The Encyclopedia of Popular Music	3/5 stars

The Waterloo Region Record wrote that "Runrig is relentlessly serious, their music always skirting the edges of overkill." The Times opined that the band sounds "like a rockier version of Chris De Burgh on 'Dream Fields' and 'Move a Mountain'."

AllMusic noted that "the folk genre that dominated their early independent albums had virtually disappeared and had been replaced by an anthemic rock sound heavily influenced by their fellow Scots countrymen Big Country and Irish band U2."

== Track listing ==
1. "Amazing Things" – 4:18
2. "Wonderful" – 4:11
3. "The Greatest Flame" – 5:04
4. "Move a Mountain" – 5:13
5. "Pòg Aon Oidhche Earraich" (A Kiss One Spring Evening) – 3:38
6. "Dream Fields" – 5:54
7. "Song of the Earth" – 4:52
8. "Forever Eyes of Blue" – 4:09
9. "Sràidean na Roinn-Eòrpa" (Streets of Europe) – 5:24
10. "Canada" – 5:12
11. "Àrd" (High) – 6:00
12. "On the Edge" – 3:53

== Personnel ==
- Iain Bayne – drums, percussion
- Malcolm Jones – guitars, banjo, mandolin, accordion, pipes, bass guitar, backing vocals
- Calum Macdonald – percussion, spoken vocals
- Rory Macdonald – vocals, bass guitar, accordion
- Donnie Munro – lead vocals
- Peter Wishart – keyboards

== Singles ==
=== The Greatest Flame ===
"The Greatest Flame"

Single by Runrig

from the album Amazing Things and Long Distance
- B-side: "The Fisherman"
- Released: 1993
- Studio: Castlesound Studios, Edinburgh, Scotland
- Label: Chrysalis – CDCHS 3975
- Songwriters: C. Macdonald; R. Macdonald
- Producer: Chris Harley

Runrig singles chronology
"Wonderful" (1993)	"The Greatest Flame" (1993)	"Song of the Earth" (1993)

Alternative cover
- Cover of the 1996 re–release

"The Greatest Flame" is a 1993 single released by Runrig, released as the second single from Amazing Things. It was released by Chrysalis in the United Kingdom and across continental Europe. The song was re–released as a remixed version in 1996 alongside the release of the bands compilation album, The Best of Runrig – Long Distance (1996).

Like the original release in 1993, the re–released version was a commercial success in the United Kingdom, reaching number thirty on the UK Singles Charts, six places higher than the original release in 1993. The 1996 version spent a total of three weeks within the UK Top 100 Singles Charts. The remix version debuted at number five on the Scottish Singles Charts in January 1997.

==== Release and performance ====
Commercially, "The Greatest Flame" continued the period of commercial success for Runrig, becoming their second UK Top 40 single following the release of "Wonderful" earlier in 1993. "The Greatest Flame" peaked at number thirty-six on the UK Singles Charts in its second week, where it spent a total of three weeks. The song debuted at number thirty-seven in the United Kingdom on 9 May 1993, climbing one place in its second week to achieve its peak position, before falling to number fifty-seven in its third and final week. Runrig performed "The Greatest Flame" on the BBC programme Top of the Pops on 20 May 1993.

The 1996 remix which was released by the band to coincide with the release of Long Distance, their greatest hits album released the same year, was also a commercial success. Released on 30 December 1996, "The Greatest Flame" was in the running to be the first number one single of 1997. In their native Scotland, it debuted at number five on the Scottish Singles Charts, before falling to eighteen in its second week. In its third week, it had slipped to number twenty-nine on the Scottish Singles Charts. Runrig again appeared on Top of the Pops to perform the 1996 remix version in January 1997.

==== Critical reception ====
The original 1993 release was credited in Musicweek as seeing the band "continue to pursue a more mainstream audience", claiming that "The Greatest Flame" is a song which "is a power ballad that sweeps along majestically in a polished and highly commercial manner". Musicweek predicted that the song would become their first Top 40 success in the United Kingdom, resulting in "casual buyers then warming to its considerable charms".

==== Track listings ====
CD single 1 (UK):

1. "The Greatest Flame" (Radio Version) – 4:25
2. "Saint of the Soil" – 5:02
3. "An t-Iasgair (The Fisherman)" – 3:20
4. "Suilven" – 3:50

CD single 2 (UK):

1. "The Greatest Flame"
2. "The Fisherman"
3. "Morning Tide"
4. "Chi Mi'n Tir = I See the Land"

CD single (Netherlands):

1. "The Greatest Flame" (Radio Version)
2. "An t-Iasgair (The Fisherman)"
3. "Morning Tide"
4. "Chi M'in Tir (I See the Land)"

==== Charts ====
Chart (1993)	Peak position
UK Singles (OCC)	36

Chart (1996)	Peak position
Scotland Singles (OCC)	5
UK Singles (OCC)	30

=== Wonderful ===
"Wonderful"

Single by Runrig

from the album Amazing Things
- B-side: "Sraidean Na Roinn Eorpa (Streets Of Europe)"
- Released: 22 February 1993
- Studio: Castlesound Studios, Edinburgh, Scotland
- Label: Chrysalis – CDCHS 3952
- Songwriters: C. Macdonald; R. Macdonald
- Producer: Chris Harley

Runrig singles chronology
"Flower of the West" (1991)	"Wonderful" (1993)	"The Greatest Flame" (1993)

"Wonderful" is a 1993 single released by Runrig, which was released on 22 February 1993 as the lead single from Amazing Things. The release of "Wonderful" marked the first appearance of Runrig in the UK Top 40 Singles Chart, after the song debuted at number twenty-nine on the UK Singles Chart on 6 March 1993. It spent a total of three weeks on the UK Singles Chart before falling to number forty-three in its second week and number seventy in its third week.

==== Promotion ====
Runrig appeared on the 4 March 1993 broadcast of Top of the Pops on the BBC to perform "Wonderful". They also performed the song on the BBC television magazine programme Pebble Mill at One.

==== Track listing ====
CD single (UK):

1. "Wonderful" (written by C. Macdonald, R. Macdonald) – 3:57
2. "Sraidean Na Roinn Eorpa (Streets of Europe)" (written by C. Macdonald, R. Macdonald) – 5:11
3. "On the Edge" (written by M. Jones, P. Wishart) – 3:53

CD single (Europe):

1. "Wonderful" (written by C. Macdonald, R. Macdonald) – 3:57
2. "Sraidean Na Roinn Eorpa (Streets of Europe)" (written by C. Macdonald, R. Macdonald) – 5:11
3. "On the Edge" (written by M. Jones, P. Wishart) – 3:53

Vinyl, 7" (UK):

1. "Wonderful" – 3:46 (produced by Chris Harley, written by C. MacDonald, R. MacDonald)
2. "April Come She Will" – 2:24 (mixed by Calum Malcolm, written by Paul Simon)

==== Charts ====
Chart (1993)	Peak position
UK Singles (OCC)	29

== Chart performance ==
Chart performance for Amazing Things
Chart (1993)	Peak position
German Albums (Offizielle Top 100)	47
UK Albums (OCC)	2

=== Certifications ===
- United Kingdom (BPI) – Silver
