= The Stamping Ground =

Studio album by Runrig
- Released: 6 May 2001 (UK)
- Recorded: CaVa Studios, Glasgow, Scotland / Lundgaard Studios, Denmark / Junk!, São Paulo, Brazil
- Genre: Celtic rock
- Length: 56:39
- Label: Ridge
- Producer: Runrig, Kristian Gislason, Paul Mounsey

Runrig chronology
In Search of Angels (1999)	The Stamping Ground (2001)	Proterra (2003)

The Stamping Ground is the eleventh studio album by Scottish Celtic rock band Runrig, released on 6 May 2001 on Ridge Records. The album marks the final appearance of keyboardist Peter Wishart, who departed from the band to follow a career in politics.

A copy of the album was aboard STS-107, and it was among the personal effects that were recovered following the reentry destruction of Space Shuttle Columbia on 1 February 2003. The song "Running to the Light" had been used for astronaut Laurel Clark's wake-up call during the mission.

== Track listing ==
1. "Book of Golden Stories" – 3:52
2. "The Stamping Ground" – 5:25
3. "An Sabhal aig Nèill" (Neil's Barn) – 3:21
4. "Wall of China" / "One Man" – 3:49
5. "The Engine Room" – 3:23
6. "One Thing" – 5:01
7. "The Ship" – 6:05
8. "The Summer Walkers" – 4:50
9. "Running to the Light" – 5:00
10. "Òran Ailein" (Alan's Song) / "Leaving Strathconon" – 6:00
11. "Big Songs of Hope and Cheer" – 4:26
12. "Òran" (Song) – 5:31

=== CD single (UK) ===
1. "Book of Golden Stories"
2. "Big Songs of Hope and Cheer II"

=== CD single (Germany) ===
1. "Book of Golden Stories"
2. "Big Songs of Hope and Cheer II"

=== Promo single (Denmark) ===
1. "Book of Golden Stories"
2. "Big Songs of Hope and Cheer II"

== Personnel ==
Runrig

- Iain Bayne – drums, percussion
- Bruce Guthro – lead vocals
- Malcolm Jones – guitars, accordion
- Calum Macdonald – percussion
- Rory Macdonald – vocals, bass guitar
- Peter Wishart – keyboards

Additional musicians

- Jon Anderskou – cello
- Michael Bannister – mellotron
- Alyth MacCormack – vocals
- Aidan O'Rourke – fiddle
- Robin Rankin – keyboards
- Betina Stegmann – fiddle

== Singles ==
=== Book of Golden Stories ===
"Book of Golden Stories"

Single by Runrig

from the album The Stamping Ground
- B-side: "Big Songs Of Hope And Cheer II"
- Released: 2001
- Studio: Castlesound Studios, Edinburgh, Scotland
- Label: Ridge Records (UK); Columbia Records (Germany); RecArt Music (Denmark)
- Songwriters: C. Macdonald; R. Macdonald
- Producer: Calum Malcolm

Runrig singles chronology
"This Is Not a Love Song" (1999)	"Book of Golden Stories" (2001)	"Wall of China" (2001)

"Book of Golden Stories" is a 2001 single released by Runrig as the lead single of The Stamping Ground. The single failed to match the earlier success that the band had come to experience, particularly during the 1990s, charting outside the UK Top 100 Singles Charts at number one hundred and ninety one in May 2001 in the United Kingdom.

==== Promotion ====
Runrig appeared on the German game show Geld oder Liebe on 9 June 2001 to perform "Book of Golden Stories". on 15 December 2001, they performed the song as part of their setlist during their Rockpalast appearance in Germany. In 2002, shortly following the release of "Book of Golden Stories", Runrig performed at a tribute concert in memory of singer Stuart Adamson, lead singer of Big Country. Runrig member, Pete Wishart, was a former member of Big Country between 1981–1982 as the keyboardist.

The band performed "Book of Golden Stories" on their final concert tour, The Last Dance, and released an official video of their final performance of the song recorded in Stirling in 2018. Critically, the song has since been described as a "Runrig classic" since its original release, and has been included on the majority of the bands touring setlist since its release in 2001.

It was later included on the album release of the bands farewell concert, The Last Dance: Farewell Concert, which was released in September 2019.

==== Chart performance ====
Chart (2001)	Peak position
UK Singles (OCC)	191
