= Recovery (Runrig album) =

Studio album by Runrig
- Released: 1981
- Recorded: 1981
- Studio: Castesound Studios, Pencaitland
- Genre: Celtic rock
- Length: 44:50
- Language: Scottish Gaelic; English
- Label: Ridge
- Producer: Robert Bell

Runrig chronology
The Highland Connection (1979)	Recovery (1981)	Heartland (1985)

Recovery is the third album by Scottish Celtic rock band Runrig. It was released in on LP and cassette tape in 1981 on the band's own label, Ridge Records. A CD version of the album was released on the same label in 1989. The album deals with the social history of the Scottish Gàidhealtachd, mirroring a renewed sense of cultural and political identity within the Scottish Gaelic community.

Two of the tracks originally recorded for this album ("An Toll Dubh" and "The Old Boys") were re-recorded and released on Proterra in 2003.

== Track listing ==
Side 1
No.	Title	Writer(s)	Length
1.	"An Toll Dubh" (The Dungeon (literally, "The Black Hole"))	Calum MacDonald, Rory MacDonald	1:58
2.	"Rubh nan Cudaigean" (Cuddy Point)	Calum MacDonald	2:51
3.	"'Ic Iain 'ic Sheumais" (Son of Iain, son of James)	Traditional (arranged by Rory MacDonald)	6:05
4.	"Recovery"	Calum MacDonald, Rory MacDonald	5:50
5.	"Instrumental"	Malcolm Jones	3:58
Total length:			20:42

Side 2
No.	Title	Writer(s)	Length
1.	"'S tu mo leannan" (You are my love)/Nightfall on Marsco"	Calum MacDonald, Rory MacDonald	2:51
2.	"Breaking the Chains"	Malcolm Jones	1:53
3.	"Fuaim a' bhlàir" (The noise of battle)	Calum MacDonald, Rory MacDonald	4:55
4.	"Tìr an Airm" (Land of the army)	Calum MacDonald	4:22
5.	"The Old Boys"	Calum MacDonald (Note: The pipe air on "The Old Boys" is adapted from "Fàgail Viewfield" by Dougald C MacLeod.)	4:44
6.	"Dust"	Calum MacDonald	5:23
Total length:			24:08

== Personnel ==
- Donnie Munro – lead vocals (tracks 1, 2, 6, 8–11), backing vocals (tracks 1, 8, 11), percussion (track 1)
- Rory MacDonald – lead vocals (tracks 1, 3, 4, 9, 11), backing vocals (tracks 1, 6, 8, 11), percussion (track 1), bass (tracks 3, 6, 8, 11), acoustic guitar (tracks 4, 11), accordion (tracks 4, 11), harmony vocals (tracks 9, 10)
- Calum MacDonald – backing vocals (tracks 1, 11), percussion (track 1), lead vocals (track 11)
- Malcolm Jones – backing vocals (tracks 1, 6, 8, 11), percussion (track 1), electric guitar (tracks 2, 3, 5–9), acoustic guitar (track 2, 5, 7, 9, 11), bass (tracks 2, 7), acoustic bass (track 5), bagpipes (tracks 5, 7)
- Iain Bayne – drums (tracks 2, 3, 6–9, 11), congas (track 6), percussion (tracks 6, 7, 9), tympani (track 8), backing vocals (track 11)

Additional musicians

- Blair Douglas – organ (tracks 3, 9, 11), harmonium (track 10)
- Ronnie Gerrard – fiddle (track 4)
- John Martin – cello (track 10)
