= Searchlight (album) =

Studio album by Runrig
- Released: 1989
- Recorded: Castlesound Studios, Pentcaitland, Scotland / Great Linford Manor, Milton Keynes, England
- Genre: Celtic rock, pop
- Length: 49:12
- Label: Chrysalis
- Producer: Richard Mainwaring

Runrig chronology
The Cutter and the Clan (1987)	Searchlight (1989)	The Big Wheel (1991)

Professional ratings
Review scores
Source	Rating
Record Mirror	2.5/5 stars

Searchlight is the sixth studio album released by Scottish Celtic rock band Runrig. The album was released on 25 September 1989 by Chrysalis Records. It spawned one single, "News from Heaven", which reached number ninety on the UK Singles Charts.

== Release and promotion ==
The album was released on 25 September 1989 via Chrysalis in the United Kingdom, Germany and Spain. In 1990, Runrig performed the album's only single "News From Heaven" live on the BBC Children in Need broadcast. In 2014, Searchlight was included on a 5 CD Box released by the band under Chrysalis, along with four of the bands other studio albums – The Cutter and the Clan, The Big Wheel, Amazing Things and Mara.

Following its release, Searchlight was certified Silver by the British Phonographic Industry (BPI) on 12 October 1989. It was later awarded a Gold certification from the BPI, indicating sales of over 100,000 copies, on 1 January 1991.

== News from Heaven ==
"News from Heaven"

Single by Runrig

from the album Searchlight
- B-side: "Smalltown"
- Released: September 1989
- Studio: Castlesound Studios, Edinburgh, Scotland
- Label: Chrysalis – CHS 12 3404

Runrig singles chronology
"Protect and Survive" (1988)	"News from Heaven" (1989)	"Every River" (1989)

News from Heaven is a 1989 single released in September 1989 as the lead single from Searchlight. The single marked the second appearance of the band on the UK Top 100 Singles Charts following its peak at number ninety on the week of 16 September 1989. It remained on the UK Singles Charts for two weeks.

The release of "News from Heaven" marked one of the first releases by the band since they signed with new record label, Chrysalis Records. The bands spokesperson confirmed that Runrig were already in talks to sign with Chrysalis Records in late 1988 and early 1989 before Runrig were scheduled to appear on stage during Aural Sects Rock Week.

In 1990, Runrig performed "News from Heaven" on the television broadcast by the BBC for Children in Need. "News from Heaven" was added to the groups setlist for concerts in 1989, beginning with a concert at the Barrowland Ballroom in Glasgow on 27 September 1989. Part of the song served as the opening of the bands concert in November 1989 at Un Año De Rock Madrid, Spain.

== Track listing ==
=== Album ===
All songs written by Calum Macdonald and Rory Macdonald.

1. "News from Heaven" - 3:36
2. "Every River" - 4:46
3. "City of Lights" - 4:25
4. "Èirinn" (Ireland) - 4:55
5. "Tìr A' Mhurain" (Land of the Marram Grass) - 3:54
6. "World Appeal" - 2:20
7. "Tear Down These Walls" - 4:08
8. "Only the Brave" - 3:58
9. "Sìol Ghoraidh" (The Genealogy of Goraidh) - 5:21
10. "That Final Mile" - 3:07
11. "Smalltown" - 4:02
12. "Precious Years" - 4:46

=== Lead single ===
==== Vinyl, 12", single (UK) ====
1. "News from Heaven"
2. "Smalltown"
3. "Chi Mi'n Tir / I See the Land" (composed by D.J. McCuish)
4. "Times They Are A-Changin" (composed by Bob Dylan)

==== CD single (UK) ====
1. "News from Heaven"
2. "Smalltown"
3. "Chi Mi'n Tir / I See the Land" (composed by D.J. McCuish)
4. "Times They Are A-Changin" (Composed by Bob Dylan)

==== Vinyl, 7", 45 RPM (Australia) ====
1. "News from Heaven"
2. "Smalltown"

== Chart performance ==
=== Album charts ===
Chart (1989)	Peak position
UK Albums (OCC)	11

=== Singles charts ===
Chart (1989)	Peak position
UK Singles (OCC)	90

=== Certifications ===
Region	Certification	Certified units/sales
United Kingdom (BPI)	Gold	100,000^{^}
^{^} Shipments figures based on certification alone.

== Personnel ==
Runrig

- Iain Bayne - drums, percussion
- Malcolm Jones - guitars, mandolin, accordion
- Calum Macdonald - percussion
- Rory Macdonald - vocals, bass guitar
- Donnie Munro - lead vocals
- Peter Wishart - keyboards
