= Donnie Munro =

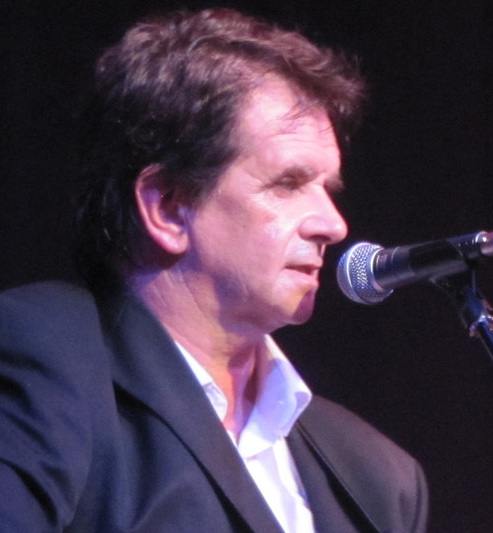
- Munro performing at Morecambe, February 2010

Background information
- Born: 2 August 1953 (age 73); Uig, Isle of Skye, Inverness-shire, Scotland
- Origin: Isle of Skye, Inverness-shire, Scotland
- Genres: Folk rock, celtic rock
- Occupations: Singer–songwriter, politician
- Instruments: Vocals, guitar
- Years active: 1973–present
- Label: Greentrax
- Website: www.donniemunro.co.uk

Donnie Munro (Scottish Gaelic: Donaidh Rothach /dɔnɪ rɔhəx/) (born 2 August 1953) is a Scottish musician and politician, best known as the former lead singer of the band Runrig. Munro served as the band's lead vocalist during their most commercially successful period, 1987–1995, particularly with the release of their album The Cutter and the Clan and the 1995 single "An Ubhal as Àirde (The Highest Apple)" which made chart history by becoming the first song to be performed in Scottish Gaelic to chart in the United Kingdom. Mara (1995) served as the last album released by Runrig to feature Munro on lead vocals, leaving the band in 1997 to pursue a career in politics.

Following his departure from Runrig, he turned down the opportunity to stand as the parliamentary candidate for Scottish Labour for the Glasgow Shettleston constituency, considered the "safest Labour seat in Scotland". He instead stood as the parliamentary candidate for the Ross, Skye and Inverness West constituency at the 1999 Scottish Parliament election, coming second to Liberal Democrat John Farquhar Munro. His 2006 solo album, Heart of America, won Album of the Year at the 2006 Scots Trad Music Awards. As a native speaker of Scottish Gaelic, much of his work is performed in the language.

== Early life ==
Munro was born in Uig, Isle of Skye, in the Inner Hebrides. He attended Gray's School of Art in Aberdeen and obtained a postgraduate degree in teaching from Moray House in Edinburgh.

== Career ==
=== Runrig (1973–1997) ===
He first witnessed a Runrig performance in 1973 and was approached a year later to join the band. As the lead singer of Runrig, Munro gained recognition as a prominent Gaelic music performer in the 1980s and 1990s. They released their debut album, Play Gaelic, in April 1978, followed by the albums The Highland Connection (1979), Recovery (1981) and Heartland (1985). The band achieved moderate breakthrough commercial success in 1987 upon the release of The Cutter and the Clan, which yielded the singles "Worker for the Wind" / "Alba" and "Protect and Survive", which peaked just outside the Top 100 of the UK Singles Chart. "News from Heaven" was released as the lead single from their sixth album Searchlight (1989), which peaked at number ninety on the UK Singles Chart. Searchlight reached a peak of number eleven on the UK Albums Chart, and was certified Silver in the United Kingdom and marked the beginning of a period of commercial success for the band across Europe.

The early 1990s continued a period of success for the band, particularly in the British and German music markets. The Big Wheel (1991) and Amazing Things (1993) both reached the top five of the UK Albums Chart, whilst Amazing Things gave the band their debut appearance on the German Albums Chart following a peak position of number forty-seven. "Flower of the West" was released as the only single from The Big Wheel and peaked just outside the UK Top 40 Singles Chart, whilst "Wonderful" and "The Greatest Flame" which were the two singles to be released from Amazing Things gave the band their first appearance in the UK Top 40.

In 1996, Runrig released a cover version of "Rhythm of My Heart" by Rod Stewart, which originally was intended in the music score of the 1996 movie Loch Ness, this was due to complications between the filmmakers and Rod Stewart that Runrig was given the job. But the filmmakers settled with Rod Stewart before release and ended up using the original song by Rod Stewart. The song was included on their compilation album Long Distance. The single reached number twenty-four on the UK Singles Chart, and was followed by the release of a remixed version of "The Greatest Flame" which reached number thirty in the United Kingdom. Long Distance achieved considerable commercial success across Europe, reaching number thirteen in the United Kingdom, six in Denmark, sixty in Germany and number one in their native Scotland, whilst achieving both Gold certifications in the United Kingdom and Denmark.

In 1997, Munro left Runrig to pursue a career in politics. His farewell concert took place at Stirling Castle on 29 August, marking his final performance with the band. Munro was replaced as lead singer of the band by Canadian musician Bruce Guthro in 1998.

=== Solo career (1999–present) ===
Munro released a solo album titled Heart of America, in collaboration with fellow Skye songwriters Blair Douglas and Richard Macintyre. The album won Album of the Year at the Scots Trad Music Awards in 2006. Currently, Munro holds the position of Director of Development at Sabhal Mòr Ostaig, Scotland's National Centre for the Gaelic Language and Culture, located on the Isle of Skye.

Munro completed a series of live shows titled 'An Turas – The Journey', featuring a forty-piece ensemble. Additionally, he is preparing for the release of a live album recorded at the Royal Concert Hall in Glasgow during Celtic Connections 2008.

For Runrig's 40th anniversary at the Black Isle show ground at Muir of Ord on 10 August 2013, Munro appeared as a special guest and performed three songs. For Runrig's farewell concert, "The Last Dance" in City Park, Stirling, on 18 August 2018, Munro appeared as a special guest, performing two songs.

=== Political career (1991–1999) ===
Munro was elected as Rector of the University of Edinburgh in 1991, a position he held until 1994. His political aspirations necessitated his leaving the band, which he did in 1997. His reasons for departure occasioned lengthy private discussion over a two-year period but were not made public. He contested the UK Parliamentary seat of Ross, Skye and Inverness West for Labour in the 1997 General Election but was defeated by Charles Kennedy (Liberal Democrat). He then contested the Scottish Parliament seat of Ross, Skye and Inverness West for Labour at the 1999 Scottish Parliament election but was defeated narrowly by John Farquhar Munro, also of the Liberal Democrats, in what was traditionally a Liberal Democrat stronghold. Munro was said to have rejected the offer of a 'safe' Labour seat in Central Scotland in the 1999 election as he had already been adopted as a candidate for his native Highland constituency.

== Solo discography ==
=== Studio albums ===
- On The West Side (1999)
- Across The City and the World (2002)
- Gaelic Heart (2003)
- Heart of America (Across The Great Divide) (2006)

=== Live albums ===
- Donnie Munro Live (2000)
- Donnie Munro And Friends (2006)
- Donnie Munro Live – An Turas (2008)
- Sweet Surrender – Live Acoustic (2015)

=== Compilation albums ===
- Fields of the Young (2004)
- Donnie Munro – Best Of (2005)

== Honours ==
In 1996 he gave the Sabhal Mòr Lecture. In 1998 Munro was elected as the first rector of the UHI Millennium Institute, a post that lasted 3 years.

Academic offices
Preceded by Muriel Gray	Rector of the University of Edinburgh; 1991–1994	Succeeded by Malcolm Macleod
Preceded by New position	Rector of the UHI Millennium Institute; 1998–2001	Succeeded by Sir Alistair MacFarlane
