= Calum MacDonald (musician) =

- Born: Calum MacDonald; 12 November 1953 (age 72); Lochmaddy, North Uist, Scotland
- Origin: Isle of Skye, Scotland
- Genres: Celtic rock
- Occupations: Teacher; Musician
- Instruments: Percussion; Drums; Vocals; Backing vocals; piano accordion
- Years active: 1973–present
- Labels: Neptune Records; Lismor Records; Ridge Records; Chrysalis Records
- Formerly of: Runrig; The Band from Rockall

Calum MacDonald (Scottish Gaelic: Calum Dòmhnallach /kalˠəm dɔ̃ːnəlˠəx/; born 12 November 1953) is a musician who was a founder member of and percussionist in the Scottish Celtic rock band Runrig. MacDonald was the band's primary songwriter with his older brother Rory MacDonald from 1973 to 2018. Generally, Rory wrote the melodies and Calum the lyrics.

== Early life ==
MacDonald was born in Lochmaddy, North Uist before moving to Portree, on the Isle of Skye, for secondary school. It was in Skye that MacDonald and his brother Rory formed Runrig along with Blair Douglas and subsequently Donnie Munro and Robert MacDonald.

He attended Jordanhill College and worked as a P.E. teacher at Lasswade High School and other schools in Lothian until 1983 when he became a professional musician.

== Later life ==
During the 1980s, MacDonald's Christian faith deepened and this influence began to be felt in his lyrical content, in both Gaelic and English. He was based in Edinburgh for the 1980s and early 1990s before relocating his young family to Contin in the Scottish Highlands. MacDonald has contributed main vocals to a handful of Runrig tunes, including Dust and Faileas air an Airigh.
