= Runrig =

Scottish Celtic rock band

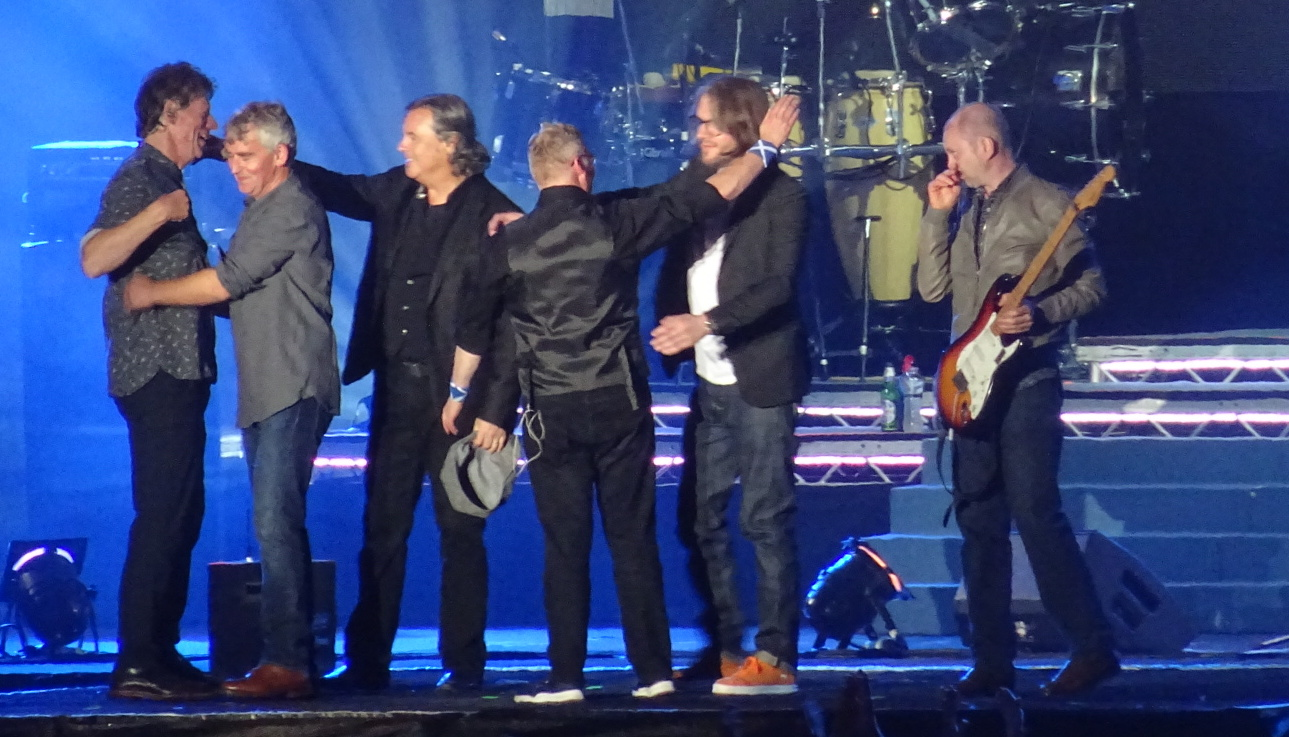
- Runrig at their final concert show, The Last Dance, Stirling, August 2018

Background information
- Also known as: The Run Rig Dance Band
- Origin: Isle of Skye, Scotland
- Genres: Celtic rock, folk rock
- Years active: 1973–2018
- Labels: Ridge Records, Chrysalis, Columbia
- Past members: Rory MacDonald; Calum MacDonald; Donnie Munro; Malcolm Jones; Iain Bayne; Pete Wishart; Bruce Guthro; Blair Douglas; Robert Macdonald; Campbell Gunn; Richard Cherns; Brian Hurren
- Website: www.runrig.co.uk

Runrig were a Scottish Celtic rock band formed on the Isle of Skye in 1973. From its inception, the band's line-up included brothers and songwriters Rory MacDonald (bass, vocals) and Calum MacDonald (percussion). The line-up during most of the 1980s and 1990s, which was the band's most successful period commercially, also included Donnie Munro (vocals), Malcolm Jones (guitar), Iain Bayne (drums), and Pete Wishart (keyboards).

At the height of their success during the 1980s and 1990s, Runrig were described by Billboard as one of the "most celebrated" Gaelic language bands in Scotland. Their 1995 single "An Ubhal as Àirde (The Highest Apple)" made history by becoming the first song to be sung in Scottish Gaelic to chart on the UK Singles Charts. In 2007, they re-released their 1983 debut single "Loch Lomond" with the Tartan Army, entitled "Loch Lomond (Hampden Remix)". It debuted at number one in their native Scotland, remaining on the top spot for four weeks, and in the United Kingdom, debuted at number nine, earning a Silver certification from the BPI.

In 2016, the band announced their retirement from recording and performing following the release of The Story, (2016) and announced their final tour The Final Mile in 2017. In August 2018, Runrig performed the final shows of their farewell tour, entitled The Last Dance, in Stirling City Park beneath the castle ramparts. An estimated 52,000 fans attended The Last Dance.

== History ==
=== Formation and early years (1973–1987) ===
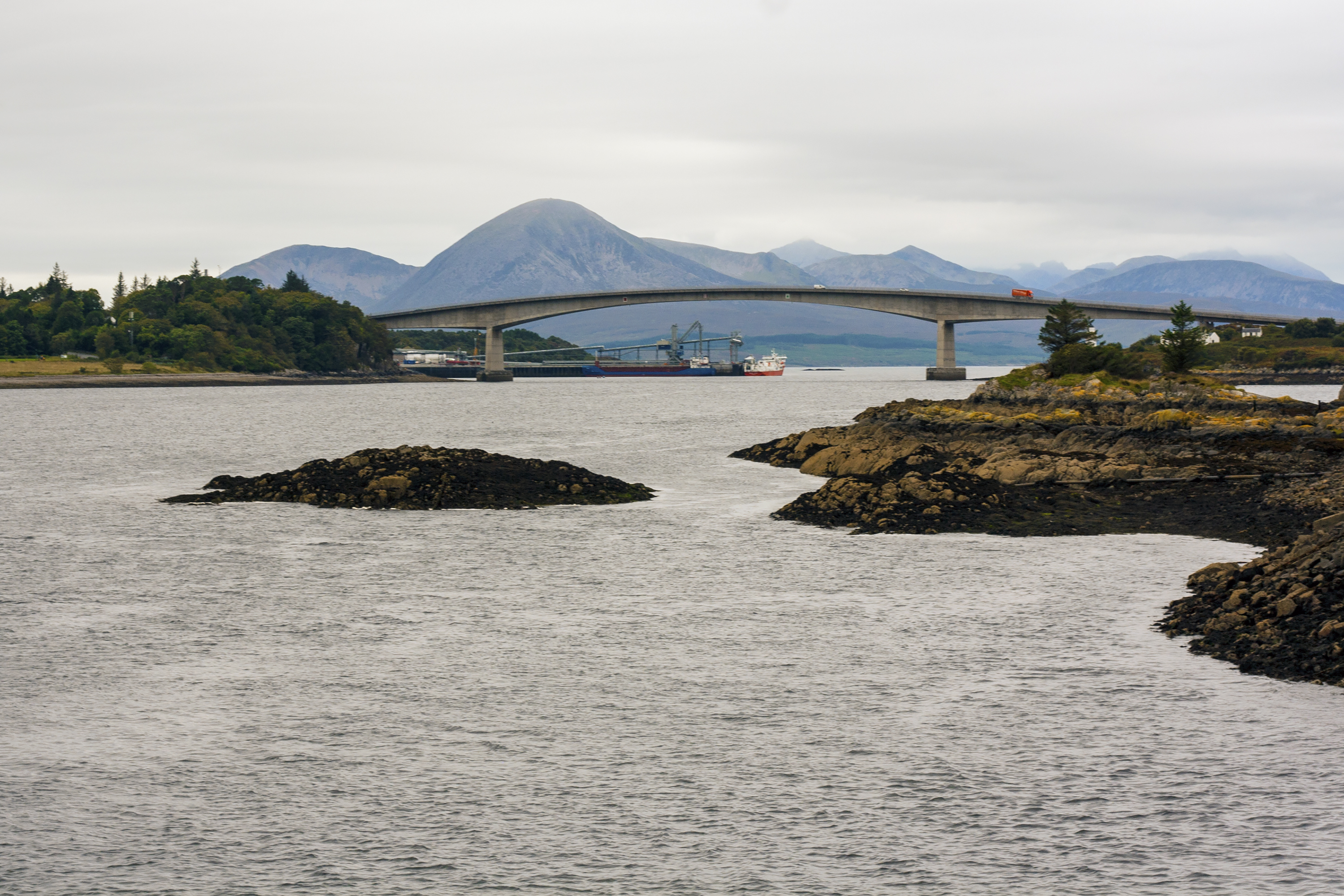
Runrig formed on the Isle of Skye in 1973

Initially formed as a three-piece dance band known as 'The Run Rig Dance Band', the band played several low key events, and has previously cited a ceilidh at Kelvin Hall, Glasgow as their first concert. The band was formed in 1973 with brothers Calum and Rory Macdonald and their friend Blair Douglas. Donnie Munro joined the following year and they started to expand outside their native Isle of Skye. Douglas left the band in late 1974 and was replaced by Robert Macdonald. This line-up continued until 1978, when Douglas re-joined and Malcolm Jones became guitarist, both displacing Robert Macdonald. In the same year, Runrig's first album, entitled Play Gaelic, was released. All the songs were in Gaelic. It was re-released in 1990 as Play Gaelic, the first legendary recording. In 1979, Blair Douglas left Runrig again to pursue a solo career. 1979 also saw the release of Runrig's second album, The Highland Connection on the band's own label, Ridge Records. A somewhat transitional album, it features wailing electric guitars and ballads. The album also included the original version of "Loch Lomond". A later version was to become their signature song and closing song at concerts.

The third Runrig album, Recovery (released in 1981), was a thematic record dealing with the rise and politics of Scotland's Gaelic community. 1980 saw the arrival of drummer Iain Bayne (from Scottish folk/rock band New Celeste) and keyboard player Richard Cherns. In 1982, Runrig re-recorded "Loch Lomond" as their first single. They signed to a small label called Simple Records in 1984, and two singles were released. The first was "Dance Called America". A longer version of the second single "Skye" appeared on the Alba Records compilation A Feast Of Scottish Folk Music, Volume One along with an early version of "Lifeline", both of which were previously unreleased on albums, and "Na h-Uain a's t-Earrach" which was the B-side to "Dance Called America".

The band then engaged the services of producer Chris Harley who brought to their recordings the benefit of his experience as a solo artist and a singer with The Alan Parsons Project and Camel. Runrig's fourth independent studio album, Heartland (released in 1985), combined Gaelic sounds with anthemic rock music. Richard Cherns left the band in February 1986 and was replaced by ex-Big Country member Pete Wishart.

=== Mainstream success and challenges (1987–2001) ===
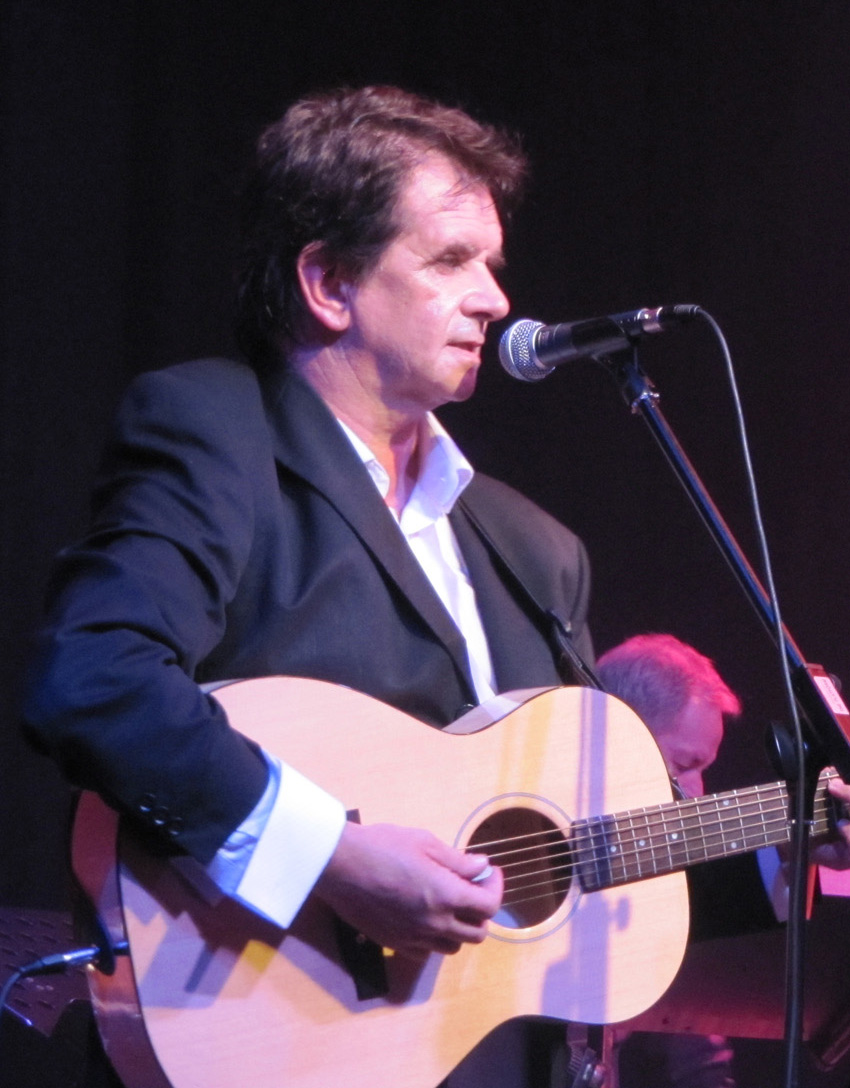
Original lead singer Donnie Munro left the band in 1997 to pursue a career in politics

The period from 1987 to 1997 marked Runrig's most successful run, during which they achieved placings in both the UK albums and singles charts, and toured extensively. With, for the first time, major-label support which was provided by Chrysalis, Runrig's fifth studio album, The Cutter and the Clan (1987), which had originally been released on the independent Ridge Records label before being re-released on Chrysalis, brought the band wider audiences in the United Kingdom, as well as in other parts of Europe. From 1987 to 1995, Runrig released a total of five studio albums through Chrysalis Records. Along with The Cutter and the Clan, the four albums released by the band under Chrysalis Records include Searchlight (1989), The Big Wheel (1991), Amazing Things (1993), and Mara (1995).

On 22 June 1991, the band attracted around 50,000 people to an outdoor concert held in Balloch Country Park, near Loch Lomond. This was the largest number of people to attend a Runrig concert. Following the release of Mara, lead singer Donnie Munro grew more involved in politics. In 1997, he left Runrig to stand for a seat in the House of Commons for the Labour Party. However, he was not elected.

Runrig began searching for a new frontman, and in 1998 they announced their selection of Bruce Guthro, a singer-songwriter from Nova Scotia. Runrig's tenth album, In Search Of Angels (1999), was released amidst some uncertainty about the band's future. Since their contract with Chrysalis had ended, Runrig chose to release In Search Of Angels on their own label, Ridge Records. As a result, the record received much less promotion than the previous five, and sales were considerably smaller. Runrig was also faced with the challenge of acclimatising their fans to a new lead vocalist. The band toured extensively in support of the record, and in 2000, they released a live album entitled Live at Celtic Connections 2000, allowing fans to hear songs previously sung by Donnie Munro by their new frontman, Bruce Guthro. At the end of 2000, the band released of an authorised songbook entitled Flower of the West – The Runrig Songbook which included lyrics, sheet music, photographs, and background information for 115 of Runrig's songs – nearly every album track and single from the band's first ten studio albums.

=== Renewed popularity (2001–2009) ===
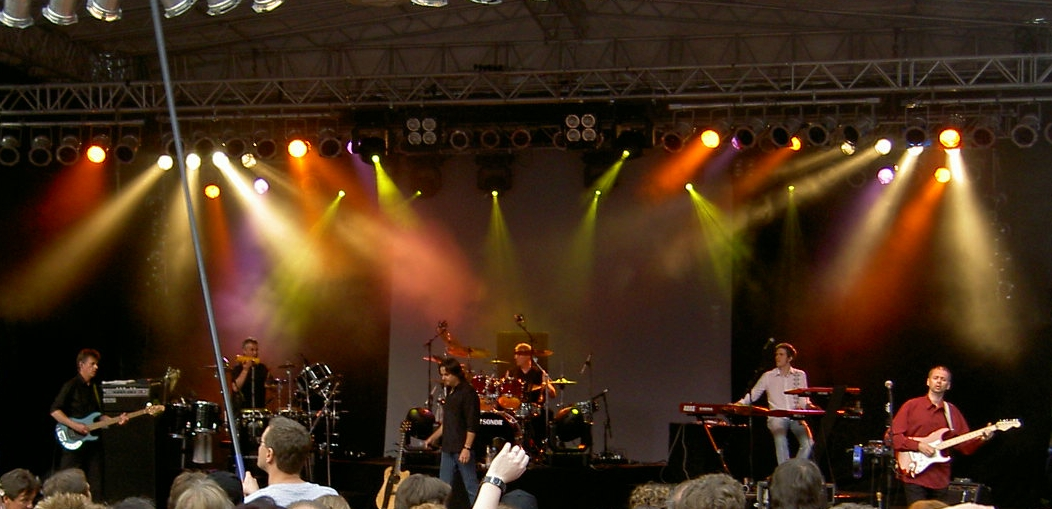
Runrig performing live in Germany, July 2004

Having established that they could continue without Donnie Munro, Runrig set to work on their eleventh studio album. Among their independently released studio albums, The Stamping Ground (2001) was Runrig's most successful. Moreover, critics who had given mixed reviews to In Search Of Angels, praised The Stamping Ground as the quintessential Runrig album. The band continued to enjoy support in the UK, Germany, and Denmark. However, with a Canadian frontman, Runrig began finding new fans in Canada and the United States. In 2001, Pete Wishart, the band's keyboard player, left after being elected Member of Parliament for the constituency of Tayside North for the Scottish National Party. In the 2005 election he was again elected, this time for the new constituency of Perth and North Perthshire and again for the SNP. Brian Hurren stepped in to take Wishart's place in the band. Wishart has been re-elected in each subsequent general election. The 2001 album The Stamping Ground was seen very much as a return to form after the lacklustre In Search Of Angels (1999), but 2003's Proterra divided opinion amongst music journalists and public alike.

In August 2003, Runrig played their 30th Anniversary concert on the esplanade at Stirling Castle, celebrating 30 years since the band's formation, and including visitors from previous line-ups, as well as guest artists including the Glasgow Islay Choir and Paul Mounsey. Runrig played their first U.S. concert, a benefit for the charity "Glasgow the Caring City", on 4 April 2006 at the Nokia Theatre in New York City. Founding member Blair Douglas joined the band onstage, playing accordion on several numbers. While the bulk of their 2007 tour was scheduled for Denmark, Germany, and England, an outdoor show, titled "Beat The Drum", was held at Loch Ness on 18 August 2007. It was staged at Borlum Farm, Drumnadrochit and attended by 18,500 people in heavy rain. Because of the unusually large number of support acts, it had been likened to an all-day music festival, Runrig being the headline act. This was the first in what was to become a staple for Runrig – annually staging big outdoor shows in Scotland in summer.

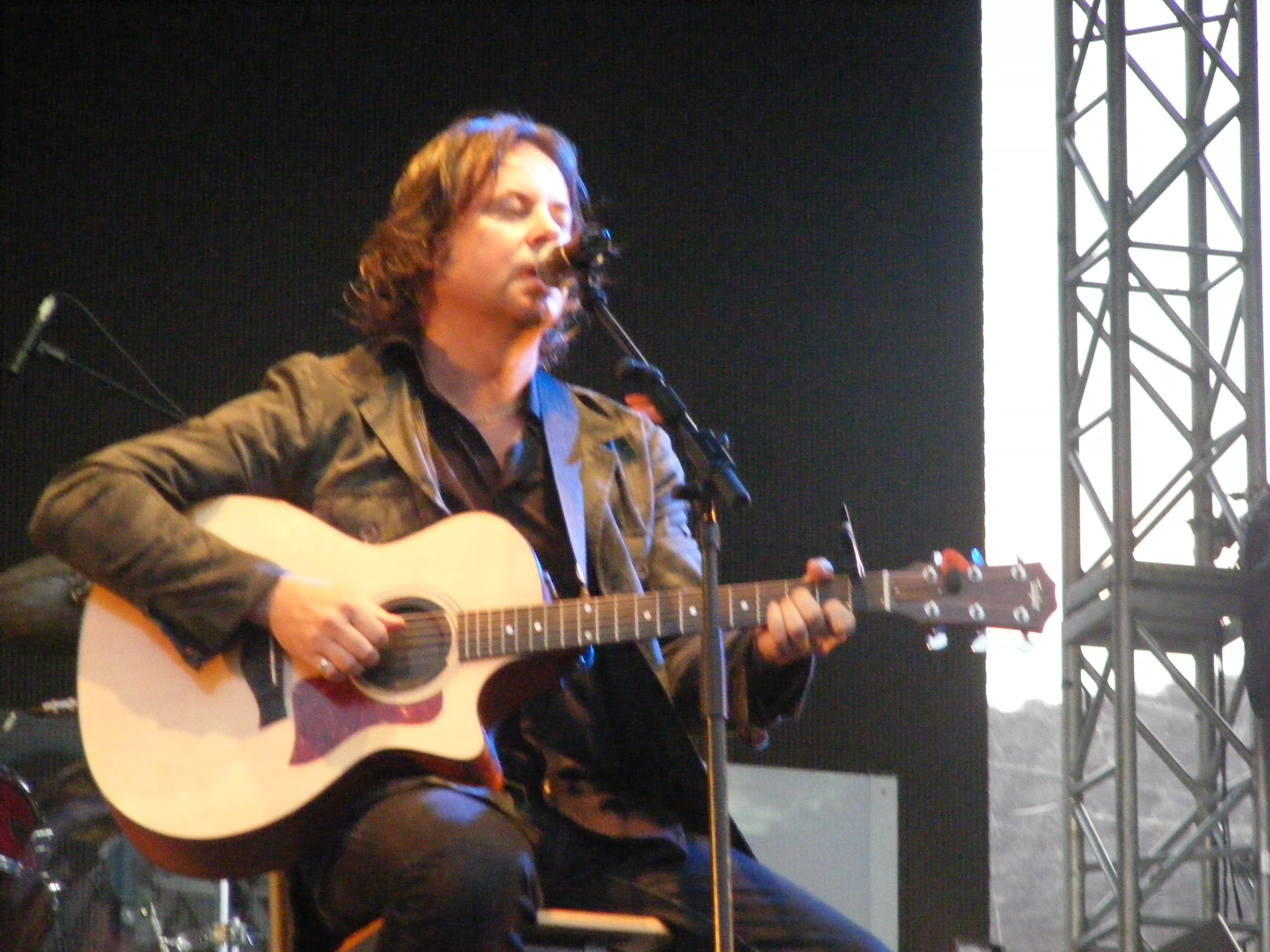
Bruce Guthro performing live with Runrig at Edinburgh Castle, 2008

Runrig re-recorded "Loch Lomond" and release it as "Loch Lomond (Hampden Remix)" to raise funds for the BBC's annual Children in Need appeal. The song was released on 12 November 2007, and includes the Tartan Army, the name used to refer to supports of the Scotland national football team, and including Rod Stewart, on backing vocals. It reached No. 9 in the UK Singles Chart. "Loch Lomond (Hampden Remix)" was named "The Best Scottish Song Of All Time" in November 2008. The band were presented the award by Lulu. On 5 December 2008, during the penultimate tour date at The Barrowlands, Glasgow, the band was inducted into the Scottish Traditional Music Hall Of Fame, by the Scottish Traditional Music Awards Director.

On 29 August 2009, Runrig performed at Scone Palace for their third annual outdoor summer show (the second being at Edinburgh Castle in 2008). They were supported by acts such as the Peatbog Faeries, piper Fred Morrison, King Creosote, Kathleen Macinnes, and Blair Douglas (a former member of the group) and his band. The show was part of Scotland's Year of Homecoming 2009. To underline this, First Minister Alex Salmond made an appearance on stage (introduced by his SNP colleague and former band member Pete Wishart), and launched an initiative called 'SconeStone.' This aims to promote Scotland as a kind and compassionate nation through the "journey of kindness" made by the SconeStone across the world. Its keepers, each holding it for a week before passing it on, are expected to undertake a good deed. Its first keeper was the Reverend Neil Galbraith, who was presented with the stone on the same day.

=== 50 Great Songs and break (2009–2012) ===
In March 2009, guitarist Malcolm Jones suffered a heart attack in Edinburgh whilst running to catch a train. This forced the band to cancel a sizable tour of Austria, Switzerland, Denmark and Germany. After undergoing minor surgery, he took to the stage with Runrig again in May of the same year. During a routine check up with his doctors in June 2009, he was strongly advised to have heart bypass surgery, which forced the band to cancel a tour of Denmark.

The operation was a success and, although the band was forced to cancel their show at the 35th Tønder Festival in Tønder, Denmark, Malcolm returned to the stage in late August 2009, at the band's big outdoor Scottish Homecoming show for 2009 at Scone Palace, Perthshire, Scotland. However, on 28 February 2010, just a week prior to an extensive German tour, it was announced that Malcolm would have to have yet another operation which in turn forced the band to cancel/postpone their Spring dates in Germany, due to start on 3 March 2010. In a statement released by the band on their official website they noted that Malcolm's health was "good" and that the problem was "purely a technical one". They also emphatically stated that "All other concerts planned for 2010 will go ahead."

It was announced that the winter tour scheduled for winter 2010 would be the last tour for a year with the band planning no concerts in 2011 so that they could focus on other projects. The final date for 2010 was in the Barrowland Ballroom, Glasgow which is traditionally where the band finishes their Scottish tours. In a statement released by the office, they promised it to be "quite a party". On 1 November 2010, the band released a four-disc compilation, entitled 50 Great Songs. The release includes both studio and live performances, focusing primarily upon Bruce Guthro's time within the band.

After the end of the 2010 tour the band collectively made the decision to take a year off. Calum and Rory had been concentrating on a long-gestating project outside of Runrig. The duo call themselves The Band from Rockall and released their debut album outside of Runrig at the end of April 2012. Keyboardist Brian Hurren also released his debut solo album, which he wrote, performed and produced himself, under the name A Hundred Thousand Welcomes, the inspiration for the name coming from Bruce Guthro shouting the Gaelic equivalent of the phrase during "Beat the Drum" at Loch Ness. Guthro released another solo album, while drummer Iain Bayne was appointed manager of English folk-rock band Coast. The band re-united as a six-piece again in the summer of 2012 for the Rewired Tour, with the big Scottish outdoor show held in August at the Northern Meeting Park in Inverness.

=== 40th anniversary and The Story (2013–2017) ===
In November 2012, ahead of their planned Rewired Tour, the band announced a special 40th Anniversary Concert at the Black Isle Show Ground in Muir of Ord, near Inverness. The 40th Anniversary show was a weekend of live entertainment featuring 'special guests', entitled "Party on the Moor". Shortly after that they announced another "special" concert at Edinburgh Castle in July, entitled "Celebration in the City". On 28 April 2013 (to mark Runrig's first ever concert 40 years earlier) Runrig released their first single in 5 years entitled "And We'll Sing". At Party on the Moor former members Donnie Munro and Pete Wishart performed onstage alongside the current lineup and Blair Douglas made an appearance via a short video highlighting the changes in the band's lineup since 1973. This was the first time Munro had performed with Runrig since 1997, and for many it was a powerful statement seeing Guthro and Munro singing together as there had been heated debates about who should be the band's frontman, and who was the better frontman among many fans and critics. The gig was hailed as a success by fans and critics many calling it one of the best concerts Runrig have ever staged. Bassist, Rory Macdonald said that "in many ways, it was the perfect Runrig gig" whilst drummer, Iain Bayne called it "the culmination of a lifetime's work".

In late 2013 it was announced that Runrig would embark on a Spring 2014 tour of England to continue the 40th Anniversary celebrations. Entitled "Party on the Tour" it would "draw inspiration" from the Party on the Moor show. Alongside the English dates, several European music festivals were announced for 2014. In December 2013 it was officially confirmed that Party on the Moor would be released on DVD. In January further details for the DVD were released. On 31 March 2014 Runrig released the full, uncut concert on both DVD, CD and, for the first time ever for Runrig, Blu-ray. The band announced in issue 74 of The Wire magazine and on their official Twitter feed that they had begun work on their 14th studio album. It was also announced (informally) that to accommodate for the time it takes to write, record and produce an album they would not be playing any further live shows in 2014 after the Tønder Festival, due to be held on 28 and 29 August 2014. In the summer 2015 issue of The Wire it was revealed that the album would be called The Story, and would be released in spring 2016.

On 12 November 2015 the title track, and lead single, received its first radio play on BBC Radio nan Gàidheal. During an interview with the show's host Derek Murray, Calum Macdonald said that the upcoming album would likely be the last studio album that the band would release, also confirming the album's release date as 29 January 2016. On 13 November 2015, the single was released in both CD and digital download form accompanied by a music video. Shortly after the single was released, the band announced that along with a sizeable tour of the UK and Europe in 2016 they would both be headlining the 21st HebCelt Festival on the Isle of Lewis and staging an outdoor show at Edinburgh Castle in July 2016.

=== The Last Dance and disbandment (2017–2018) ===
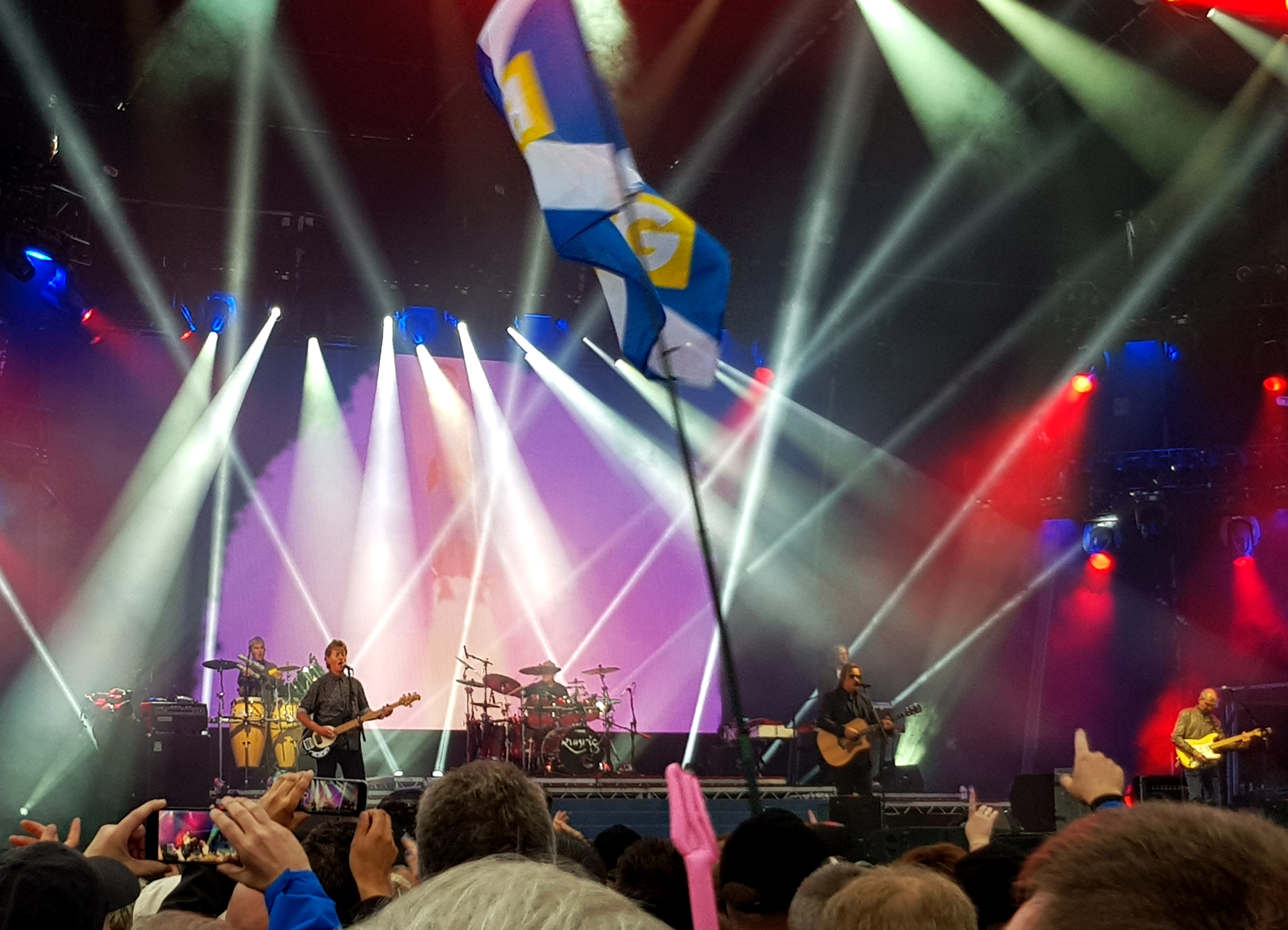
Runrig on stage during The Last Dance in Stirling, August 2018

On 26 September 2017, Runrig announced that after forty-five years they would be "pulling the curtain down" on both recording and performing. Following the announcement, the band announced a final concert tour entitled The Final Mile which would include dates in Germany, Denmark and the United Kingdom. The tour concluded with a final show in Stirling's City Park entitled The Last Dance which took place over two days and was attended by over 50,000 people over the course of the two dates. During the tour, all members of Runrig were given the opportunity to be "front and centre" for a period of time during the setlist, from a drum set which included Iain Bayne and Calum MacDonald and keyboardist Brian Hurren who performed vocals during "In Search of Angels".

Original lead singer of the band, Donnie Munro, who left in 1997 to pursue a career in politics, joined the band to perform "Cearcal a’ Chuain" and "Cum ‘Ur n’Aire" alongside the Glasgow Islay Gaelic Choir. To conclude the concert, Macdonald thanked fans for "45 years of memories you’ve given to us" and vowed that whilst the band "will not perform on stage as Runrig again, the music lives on".

=== Post–breakup (2018–present) ===
In September 2018, one month following their final performance in Stirling during The Last Dance, Sony Music released a box set compilation entitled Original Album Classics. In August 2019, the band announced the release of the concert on audio and film formats entitled The Last Dance – Farewell Concert. In 2021, BBC Alba broadcast The Last Dance from Stirling in April, marking the first time the performance had been broadcast on television, alongside other programmes devoted to the band over the course of the weekend spanning 2–4 April 2021.

Bruce Guthro, who joined the band in 1998 following the departure of original lead singer Donnie Munro, died on 5 September 2023 from cancer.

== Artistry ==
Runrig's music is often described as a blend of folk and rock music, with the band's lyrics often focusing upon locations, history, politics, and people that are unique to Scotland. Songs also make references to agriculture, land conservation and religion. Many of the band's songs include references to Scottish history or culture. These include the band's name itself – which is a reference to a pre–agricultural revolution farming practice, run rig.

== Membership ==
- Roderick "Rory" Macdonald (1973–2018)
  - Date of birth: 27 July 1949
  - Place of birth: Dornoch, Sutherland, Scotland
  - Instruments: bass, lead, backing and harmony vocals, electric and acoustic guitars, accordion
- Calum Macdonald (1973–2018)
  - Date of birth: 12 November 1953
  - Place of birth: Lochmaddy, North Uist, Scotland
  - Instruments: percussion, backing and occasional lead vocals
- Blair Douglas (1973–1974, 1978–1979)
  - Place of birth: Skye, Scotland
  - Instruments: accordion, keyboards
- Donnie Munro (1974–1997)
  - Date of birth: 2 August 1953
  - Place of birth: Uig, Skye, Scotland
  - Instruments: lead vocals, guitar
- Robert Macdonald (1974–1978)
  - Instruments: accordion
- Campbell Gunn (1975–1976)
  - Instruments: vocals
- Malcolm Jones (1978–2018)
  - Date of birth: 12 July 1959
  - Place of birth: Inverness, Scotland
  - Instruments: electric and acoustic guitars, pipes, accordion, occasional bass
- Iain Bayne (1980–2018)
  - Date of birth: 1 January 1960
  - Place of birth: St Andrews, Scotland
  - Instruments: drums, percussion, occasional backing vocals
- Richard Cherns (1981–1986)
  - Instruments: keyboards
- Pete Wishart (1986–2001)
  - Date of birth: 9 March 1962
  - Place of birth: Dunfermline, Scotland
  - Instruments: keyboards
- Bruce Guthro (1998–2018)
  - Date of birth: 31 August 1961
  - Place of birth: Cape Breton Island, Nova Scotia, Canada
  - Instruments: lead vocals, acoustic guitar
- Brian Hurren (2001–2018)
  - Date of birth: 9 October 1980
  - Place of birth: Falkirk, Scotland
  - Instruments: keyboards, vocals, accordion

== Discography ==
Studio albums

- Play Gaelic (1978)
- The Highland Connection (1979)
- Recovery (1981)
- Heartland (1985)
- The Cutter and the Clan (1987)
- Searchlight (1989)
- The Big Wheel (1991)
- Amazing Things (1993)
- Mara (1995)
- In Search of Angels (1999)
- The Stamping Ground (2001)
- Proterra (2003) (with Paul Mounsey)
- Everything You See (2007)
- The Story (2016)

== See also ==
- List of Runrig's Gaelic songs
