= Rory MacDonald (musician) =

- Born: Roderick MacDonald; 27 July 1949 (age 76); Dornoch, Sutherland, Scotland
- Origin: Isle of Skye, Scotland
- Genres: Celtic rock
- Occupations: Graphic designer; Musician
- Instruments: Bass; guitar; vocals; accordion
- Years active: 1965–1968; 1973–present
- Labels: Neptune Records; Lismor Records; Ridge Records; Chrysalis Records
- Formerly of: Runrig; The Band from Rockall; The Skyvers

Roderick "Rory" MacDonald (Scottish Gaelic: Ruaraidh Dòmhnallach /ruərɪ dɔ̃ːnəlˠəx/; born 27 July 1949) is a Scottish songwriter and musician. He was bassist, and a primary song writer, for Celtic rock band Runrig, alongside his younger brother, Calum MacDonald. Generally, Rory wrote the melodies, and Calum the lyrics. After former lead singer Donnie Munro left the band in 1997, Rory took lead vocal duties on songs in the band's catalogue written in the Scottish Gaelic language, as the band's new lead singer, Bruce Guthro, was not a Gaelic speaker.

MacDonald previously attended the Glasgow School of Art and had a promising career as a graphic designer until Runrig went 'professional'. Later putting these skills into practice, he designed the covers for Runrig's Recovery and Heartland albums.

== Early life ==
MacDonald was born at Dornoch in Sutherland. His father, Donald John MacDonald of North Uist in the Outer Hebrides, was a World War II veteran. The family moved to North Uist, when Rory was about four years old, living at Lochmaddy where his younger brother Calum was born. They moved to Portree on Skye when MacDonald was 12 years old.

During the Second World War, MacDonald's father and his unit were ambushed in Normandy. He witnessed the death of his best friend, Sandy MacIntyre. After this, Donald used to visit Sandy's family. On one such occasion, when Rory was eight, he was taken along to Sandy's old home. There, Sandy's parents gave him his old accordion. Back home, he began practising, playing at school concerts. On this accordion he wrote his first ever tune: a Scottish dance march called "Sandy MacIntyre". This experience partly inspired the 1985 song "The Everlasting Gun", featured on the Heartland album, along with news of the Falklands War.

In the mid to the late 1960s, MacDonald was a part of a band called The Skyvers.
