= Long Distance (Runrig album) =

Compilation album by Runrig
- Released: 7 October 1996
- Recorded: Various times
- Genre: Celtic rock
- Length: 1:18:12
- Label: Chrysalis Records
- Producer: Runrig

Runrig chronology
Mara (1995)	Long Distance (1996)	Beat the Drum (1998)

Long Distance (released as The Best of Runrig – Long Distance) is a 1996 compilation album released by the Scottish Celtic rock band Runrig on 7 October 1996 via Chrysalis Records. It is the second compilation album to be released by the band, following the release of Alba: The Best of Runrig (1992).

== Background and promotion ==
The compilation album covers releases by the band from the beginning of the release of The Cutter and the Clan (1987) to Mara (1995), with the live versions of "Loch Lomond" and "Skye" (both lifted from Once in a Lifetime (1988) also being included. Both songs in studio form had appeared on The Highland Connection (1979), and Heartland (1985), respectively.

Two singles were released from the album – a cover version of "Rhythm of My Heart" which reached number ten and number twenty four in Scotland and the United Kingdom respectively, and a remix version of "The Greatest Flame" which was originally released in 1993. The remix version of "The Greatest Flame" reached number five in Scotland, and number thirty in the United Kingdom.

To promote the album and the single "Rhythm of My Heart", Runrig appeared on British show GMTV to perform the song. The band also appeared on The Nicky Campbell Show performing "The Dancing Floor" and "Lighthouse" the same year, and the Gerry Kelly Show on 20 September 1996, broadcast on Ulster TV.

== Release ==
The deluxe version of the album released in 1996 contained a bonus CD, which featured tracks from the band's early output from 1978 to 1985. In 2018, Chrysalis Records released a 2LP reissue of the album.

Following its release on 7 October 1996, the album debuted atop the albums chart in their native Scotland on 13 October 1996. In the United Kingdom, it peaked at number thirteen on the UK Albums Charts in the same week, spending a total of sixteen weeks within the UK Top 100 albums chart. In Denmark, it reached number six on the albums chart and number sixty in Germany, spending six weeks within the German Top 100.

It was later certified Gold by the British Phonographic Industry (BPI) and Gold in Denmark.

== Track listing ==
1. "(Stepping Down The) Glory Road" – 3:25
2. "Alba" ("Scotland") – 4:00
3. "The Greatest Flame" – 4:25
4. "Rocket to the Moon" – 4:45
5. "Abhainn an t-Sluaigh" ("The Crowded River") – 5:20
6. "Protect and Survive" – 3:37
7. "Rhythm of My Heart" – 4:42
8. "Hearthammer" – 3:59
9. "An Ubhal as Àirde (The Highest Apple)" – 3:47
10. "Wonderful" – 3:55
11. "The Mighty Atlantic / Mara Theme" – 6:43
12. "Flower of the West" – 6:44
13. "Every River" – 4:03
14. "Sìol Ghoraidh" ("The Genealogy of Goraidh") – 5:21
15. "Hearts of Olden Glory" – 2:16
16. "Skye" – 5:07
17. "Loch Lomond" – 6:11

=== Bonus CD ===
1. "Saints of the Soil" 5:03
2. "Ravenscraig" – 4:33
3. "Solus na Madainn" – 3:38
4. "Chì Mi'n Geamhradh" – 4:18
5. "The Apple Came Down" – 3:21
6. "Chi Mi'n Tir" – 3:28
7. "Ribhinn o" – 5:39

== Chart performance ==
=== Charts ===
Chart (1996–2018)	Peak position
Danish Albums (Hitlisten)	6
German Albums (Offizielle Top 100)	60
UK Albums (OCC)	13
Scottish Albums (OCC)	1
UK Independent Albums (OCC)	38

=== Certifications ===
- United Kingdom (BPI) – Gold
- Denmark – Gold
