= Perth and North Perthshire =

UK Parliament constituency (2005–2024)

Coordinates: 56.395°N 3.435°W

- Former county constituency for the House of Commons
- Boundary of Perth and North Perthshire in Scotland
- Subdivision: Perth and Kinross
- Major settlements: Blair Atholl, Dunkeld and Birnam, Invergowrie, Perth, Pitlochry

2005–2024
- Created from: Perth (parts of), North Tayside (parts of)
- Replaced by: Perth and Kinross-shire

Perth and North Perthshire was a county constituency of the House of Commons of the Parliament of the United Kingdom. It elected one Member of Parliament (MP) by the first past the post system of election. The constituency was created in 2005.

Campaigns in the seat had resulted in a minimum of 30% of votes at each election consistently for the same two parties' choice for candidate, and the next lower-placed party's having fluctuated between 8.1% and 18.7% of the vote since its relatively recent creation. The seat attracted a record seven candidates in 2015 and had seen as few as four, in 2017.

Further to the completion of the 2023 Periodic Review of Westminster constituencies, the seat was abolished. Subject to boundary changes – entailing the transfer of "North Perthshire" to the new constituency of Angus and Perthshire Glens, offset by the addition of Strathearn, Almond and Earn and Kinross-shire from the abolished constituency of Ochil and South Perthshire – it was reformed as Perth and Kinross-shire, first contested at the 2024 general election.

== Boundaries ==
Map of boundaries 2005-2024

As a result of the Fifth Periodical Review of the Boundary Commission for Scotland, the constituency (seat) was created to cover northern parts of the Perth and Kinross council area, and first used in the 2005 general election. Ochil and South Perthshire was created, at the same time, to cover the rest of that council area and the Clackmannanshire council area.

Before the 2005 election, these combined council areas had been covered by Angus, Ochil, Perth and North Tayside seats. The Perth seat lay within the Perth and Kinross council area, North Tayside covered a northern portion of that council area and a northern portion of the Angus council area, Angus covered a small southeastern portion of the Perth and Kinross council area, a southern portion of its associated council area, and northern portions of the Dundee City council area, and Ochil covered another southeastern portion of the Perth and Kinross council area, the whole of the Clackmannanshire council area and a southeastern portion of the Stirling council area.

== Constituency profile ==
The seat's voters stretched across the north of the Perth and Kinross local council area in Scotland. It was an affluent, predominantly rural seat with notable livestock, salmon, fishing, hospitality, tourism and fruit-growing sectors. In its south, around the River Tay is Perth and its adjacent villages. Perth includes a mix of affluent middle-class suburbs to the south-west and more deprived areas around its north.

Notwithstanding the possibility of breakthrough national and local campaigns and developments, campaigns to date had produced a close-run two-candidate contest as to most of the votes between the Conservative and the Scottish National Parties' candidates. During the main forerunner seat's existence (Perth and East Perthshire, created in 1950), it returned MPs loyal to the Unionist Party and the Conservative and Unionist Party after the parties amalgamated in 1965.

The seat was one of eleven in Scotland to elect an SNP MP to Parliament at the 1974 October general election. With a rearrangement (redistribution) of seats in 1979 the successor seat of North Tayside went on to return Conservative candidate Bill Walker to Parliament until he was defeated by John Swinney of the SNP at the 1997 UK general election - from that point onwards the seat elected successive SNP members as its MP. The Conservatives narrowly missed out on gaining the seat at the 2005 UK general election: Douglas Taylor coming behind Pete Wishart by 1,521 votes. Wishart increased his majority such as with 9,641 votes clearance in 2015. The Conservative missed out on gaining the seat by 21 votes at the 2017 general election, the third-closest result in the nation after North East Fife and Kensington, but ahead of Kensington if ranked by percentage of the votes locally cast.

== Members of Parliament ==
Election	Member	Party
2005	Pete Wishart	SNP

== Elections ==
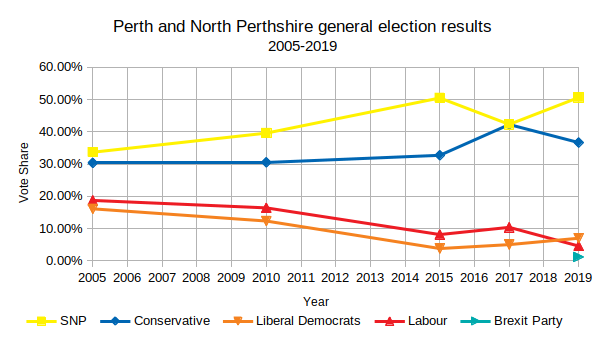
General election results of Perth and North Perthshire from 2005 to 2019

=== Elections in the 2010s ===
General election 2019: Perth and North Perthshire
Party	Candidate	Votes	%	±%
SNP	Pete Wishart	27,362	50.6	+8.3
Conservative	Angus Forbes	19,812	36.6	−5.7
Liberal Democrats	Peter Barrett	3,780	7.0	+2.0
Labour	Angela Bretherton	2,471	4.6	−5.8
Brexit Party	Stuart Powell	651	1.2	New
Majority		7,550	14.0	+14.0
Turnout		54,076	74.4	+2.6
SNP hold		Swing	+7.0	

Perth and North Perthshire was the third most marginal result in the United Kingdom and second most marginal result in Scotland at the 2017 general election, with incumbent SNP MP Pete Wishart seeing his majority cut from 9,641 votes (17.8%) to just 21 votes (0.0%) ahead of the Conservatives, although he did receive the highest number of votes for any SNP candidate.

General election 2017: Perth and North Perthshire
Party	Candidate	Votes	%	±%
SNP	Pete Wishart	21,804	42.32	−8.2
Conservative	Ian Duncan	21,783	42.28	+9.4
Labour	David Roemmele	5,349	10.4	+2.3
Liberal Democrats	Peter Barrett	2,589	5.0	+1.2
Majority		21	0.04	−17.76
Turnout		51,525	71.8	−3.0
SNP hold		Swing	-8.9	

General election 2015: Perth and North Perthshire
Party	Candidate	Votes	%	±%
SNP	Pete Wishart	27,379	50.5	+10.9
Conservative	Alexander Stewart	17,738	32.7	+2.2
Labour	Scott Nicholson	4,413	8.1	−8.3
Liberal Democrats	Peter Barrett	2,059	3.8	−8.5
Green	Louise Ramsay	1,146	2.1	New
UKIP	John Myles	1,110	2.0	New
Independent	Xander McDade	355	0.7	New
Majority		9,641	17.8	+8.7
Turnout		54,200	74.8	+7.9
SNP hold		Swing	+4.3	

General election 2010: Perth and North Perthshire
Party	Candidate	Votes	%	±%
SNP	Pete Wishart	19,118	39.6	+5.9
Conservative	Peter Lyburn	14,739	30.5	+0.1
Labour	Jamie Glackin	7,923	16.4	−2.3
Liberal Democrats	Peter Barrett	5,954	12.3	−3.8
Trust	Douglas Taylor	534	1.1	New
Majority		4,379	9.1	+5.8
Turnout		48,268	66.9	+2.1
SNP hold		Swing	+2.9	

=== Elections in the 2000s ===
General election 2005: Perth and North Perthshire
Party	Candidate	Votes	%	±%
SNP	Pete Wishart	15,469	33.7	−2.3
Conservative	Douglas Taylor	13,948	30.4	+5.4
Labour	Doug Maughan	8,601	18.7	−5.7
Liberal Democrats	Gordon Campbell	7,403	16.1	+4.0
Scottish Socialist	Philip Stott	509	1.1	−1.2
Majority		1,521	3.3	−7.7
Turnout		45,930	64.8	
SNP win (new seat)				
