= MP4 (disambiguation) =

MP4, formally MPEG-4 Part 14, is a digital multimedia format for storing video and audio.

MP4 may also refer to:

- Møller–Plesset perturbation theory of the fourth order in computational chemistry
- Mario Party 4, a 2002 video game for GameCube
- Metroid Prime 4: Beyond, an action-adventure video game for Nintendo Switch
- MP4 (band), a band made up of UK Members of Parliament
- Mammal Paleogene zone 4, a division of the Paleogene period
- McLaren MP4/1, the McLaren team's Formula One car
- MP4, a 2000 album by Michael Penn

== See also ==
- MP4 player, a marketing name for certain portable media players
