= Maastricht Rebels =

The Maastricht Rebels were British members of Parliament (MPs) belonging to the then governing Conservative Party who refused to support the government of Prime Minister John Major in a series of votes in the House of Commons on the issue of the implementation of the Maastricht Treaty (Treaty on European Union) in British law.

The Maastricht Rebellion was a major event of John Major's troubled second term as Prime Minister (1992–1997). Major's party had a small majority, thus giving the relatively small number of rebels disproportionate influence: for example, there were 22 rebels on the second reading of the European Communities (Amendment) Bill in May 1992, and the government's majority at the time was only 21.

The rebellion had the support of former Prime Minister Margaret Thatcher and former Party Chairman Norman Tebbit.

== Significant events in the rebellion ==
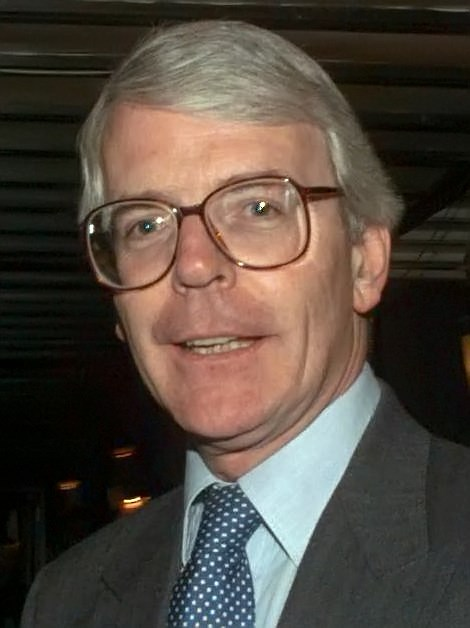
Prime Minister John Major fought for the ratification of the Maastricht Treaty.

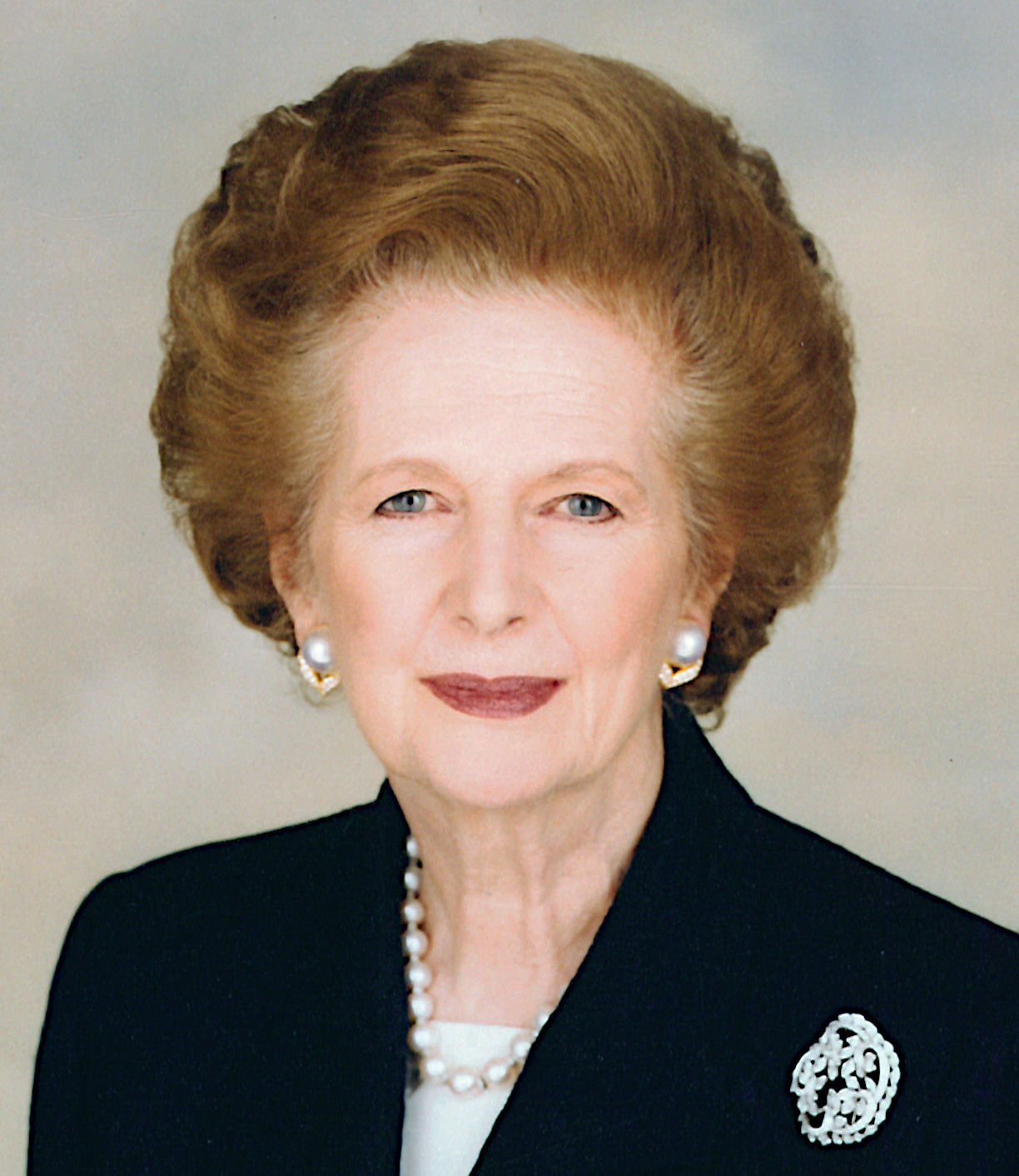
Margaret Thatcher actively opposed the Maastricht Treaty. She declared in a speech in the House of Lords that she "could never have signed that Treaty".

At the height of the rebellion, the 1993 Christchurch by-election was held, where a Conservative majority of 23,000 was turned into a Liberal Democrat majority of 16,000. Conservative showings in opinion polls were as low as 23%. John Major threatened the rebels with a general election (despite one only being held a year earlier).

The Labour Party brought in MPs who had just had surgery and others who had suffered heart attacks - a stretcher vote - to vote in the House of Commons, in an effort to bring the government down. The loyalists and rebels in the Conservative Party also brought in their own stretcher vote; for example, Bill Cash organised for one MP (Bill Walker), who was seriously ill, to fly from Scotland secretly, then hid him at the rebels' headquarters in Great College Street, before, with Labour connivance, hiding him in the family room of the Commons so that the Conservative whips would not know; the government consequently lost a vote.

At Third Reading, on 20 May 1993, the Labour whip was to abstain. Despite this, 66 Labour MPs chose to vote against the Bill, while five (Andrew Faulds, John Home Robertson, Calum MacDonald, Giles Radice and Brian Sedgemore) supported the Government. The Bill passed Third Reading 292–112.

On 22 July 1993, on a Labour amendment to postpone incorporation of the Treaty until the Government adopted the 27th Amendment thereto (the Protocol on Social Policy or "Social Chapter"), the government tied 317–317 against the combined forces of some of the rebels, the Labour Party, the Liberal Democrats and others. The tie was broken by Speaker Betty Boothroyd's casting a 'no' vote (the Speaker casting her vote in accordance with Speaker Denison's rule not to create a majority where none exists), though it later transpired that an extra 'aye' had been counted by mistake and both Boothroyd's and the erroneous vote were later expunged and the result deemed a 317-316 vote against. The remaining rebels (who had abstained on the amendment) then joined their colleagues to defeat the main take-note motion 324–316.

On the following day, it emerged, on inspection of the Division List, that the Government Whip and teller of the Opposition votes Irvine Patnick had failed to notice an overcount of one vote for the Labour amendment. Had he done so, it would have meant a clear win without a reliance being placed on the Speaker. On the next day (Friday) the government tabled a reworded motion to its predecessor, seeking the confidence of the House in their policy on the Social Chapter instead of merely "taking note" thereof. As a result, the Government easily won the substantive question by 339–299. Had the government lost this motion of confidence, a dissolution would have been requested and probably granted.

Bill Cash set-up the European Foundation to fund legal challenges to the government. Opposition to Maastricht led to the foundation of the Anti-Federalist League which ultimately led to the creation of the UK Independence Party (UKIP). Certain rebels later went on to join that political party, such as Christopher Gill and Richard Body, with Roger Knapman serving as their leader from 2002 to 2006.

The Maastricht rebels continued to harass the government on European issues, coming close to bringing the Government down three times. They repeatedly called Major's bluff on an early dissolution of Parliament. On 23 November 1994, Nicholas Budgen asked him whether he had spoken to the Queen about dissolving Parliament. On 25 November 1994, Christopher Gill stated he would sooner resign as a Conservative than vote for the Bill. All those Conservatives who rebelled over the EC Finance Bill on 28 November 1994 had the Conservative whip withdrawn.

Deselection was threatened, so those Conservative MPs would not be able to stand at the next election, although at that time it was mostly a decision for the party members in their Constituency Association. Budgen summed the attitude of the rebels up with this quote: "It would be my general feeling that the transference of power to Europe was so important a matter as to require a vote against any organisation and any party that wished to transfer that power." In 1995, Major called an early leadership election to attempt to reimpose his authority on the party, and won. However, the infighting continued, and the Conservatives were heavily defeated in the general election of May 1997.

== Rebels who had whip withdrawn ==
Those who had the whip withdrawn following the EC Finance Bill:

- Michael Carttiss (Great Yarmouth)
- Nicholas Budgen (Wolverhampton South West)
- Tony Marlow (Northampton North)
- John Wilkinson (Ruislip Northwood)
- Richard Shepherd (Aldridge-Brownhills)
- Teresa Gorman (Billericay)
- Christopher Gill (Ludlow)
- Teddy Taylor (Southend East)
- Richard Body (Holland with Boston) (resigned whip voluntarily following the withdrawal of the whip from the above eight)

Other MPs who had whip withdrawn for failure to support the government on a confidence issue related to Maastricht:

- Rupert Allason (Torbay)

== Rebels who also voted against the Government ==
- Bill Cash (Stafford)
- Nicholas Winterton (Macclesfield)
- Ann Winterton (Congleton)
- James Cran (Beverley)
- Michael Lord (Central Suffolk)
- John Biffen (North Shropshire)
- Bill Walker (North Tayside)
- Michael Spicer (South Worcestershire)
- George Gardiner (Reigate)
- Roger Knapman (Stroud)
- Peter Tapsell (East Lindsey)
- Walter Sweeney (Vale of Glamorgan)
- Sir Trevor Skeet (Bedfordshire North)
- Sir Ivan Lawrence (Burton)
- Toby Jessel (Twickenham)
- Andrew Hunter (Basingstoke)
- Warren Hawksley (Halesowen and Stourbridge)
- John Carlisle (Luton North)

== Rebels who abstained ==
- Iain Duncan Smith (Chingford)
- Nicholas Fairbairn (Perth & Kinross)
- Rhodes Boyson (Brent North)
- Bernard Jenkin (Colchester North)
- Kenneth Baker (Mole Valley)
- Vivian Bendall (Ilford North)
- Sir Nicholas Bonsor (Upminster)
- John Butcher (Coventry South West)
- Sir Peter Fry (Wellingborough)
- Sir Michael Grylls (North West Surrey)
- Roger Moate (Faversham)
- Barry Legg (Milton Keynes South West)
- David Porter (Waveney)
- John Townend (Bridlington)
- George Walden (Buckingham)
- John Whittingdale (South Colchester and Maldon)

== Other rebels ==
- Liam Fox (Woodspring) only signed 1st Early Day Motion against Maastricht
- Alan Duncan (Rutland and Melton) only signed 1st Early Day Motion against Maastricht
- David Willetts (Havant) only signed 1st Early Day Motion against Maastricht

== Changes to party rules since 1997 ==
Following the Conservatives' catastrophic defeat at the 1997 election, blamed in part on the embarrassment caused by the open rebelliousness and infighting of elements in the party, changes were made to the party's procedures to reduce the freedom of backbench MPs to rebel. Local constituency associations are now permitted to select as candidates only members of the approved party list or MPs with the whip.

The party leadership could therefore require a rebellious MP (or an MP involved in a scandal) to be deselected as a candidate by removing his or her name from the Candidates' List or by removing the whip as was done to Howard Flight at the 2005 general election. Local members who refuse to obey the instructions of Conservative Central Office can have their Association suspended (put on "Special Measures"), as was done to the Slough Association at that election when they refused to deselect their candidate.

== See also ==
- European Research Group – a group of Conservative MPs that rebelled against the Withdrawal Agreement of Theresa May in 2019.
