= MP4 (band) =

British rock band

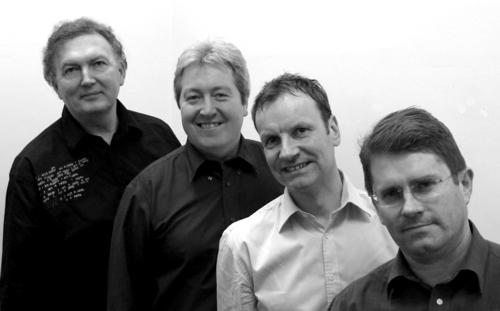
- Greg Knight, Ian Cawsey, Pete Wishart and Kevin Brennan in around 2008

Background information
- Also known as: MP3
- Origin: United Kingdom
- Genres: Rock; alternative rock; indie rock; pop rock
- Years active: 2004–present
- Members: Greg Knight; Ian Cawsey; Pete Wishart; Kevin Brennan

MP4 are a British rock band made up of four current and former British Members of Parliament.

== Members ==
The band was founded as MP3 in 2004 by Pete Wishart (Scottish National Party, Perth and North Perthshire) on keyboards, Ian Cawsey (Labour, Brigg and Goole) on bass guitar and vocals, and Sir Greg Knight (Conservative, East Yorkshire) on drums. They were later joined by Kevin Brennan (Labour, Cardiff West) on guitar, and changed the name to reflect this. Wishart was previously a keyboard player with Runrig and Big Country. Along with David Morris (Conservative, Morecambe and Lunesdale), Wishart is one of only two current MPs to have appeared on Top of the Pops.

The band first came to media attention in 2003, when the project was described as being in its "early stages".

Three of the four members were re-elected at the 2010 general election but Cawsey lost his seat and decided not to seek re-election again. He remains a band member however, and the group has indicated that they intend to continue with the same line-up.

Knight and Brennan stood down at the 2024 general election. Wishart was re-elected as the member for Perth and Kinross-shire.

== Recordings ==
In 2005, MP4 recorded an EP entitled House Music, which was initially released as a download by EMI, and later in CD format by Busy Bee Records. The EP has cover versions of the Beatles' "Can't Buy Me Love", Wilson Pickett's "In the Midnight Hour" and Steve Earle's "My Old Friend the Blues", along with the Brennan-written original "Foolish Game".

They recorded their first full album, Cross Party, produced by Robin Millar CBE, on Revolver Records. It was released in April 2010 and launched at the Speaker's House in Westminster. Eight tracks on the eleven-track album are original, with a bonus track remixed by Pete Waterman.

In November 2016, they recorded a single, "You Can't Always Get What You Want", with Ricky Wilson of the Kaiser Chiefs, KT Tunstall, David Gray, Steve Harley of Cockney Rebel and some members of the Parliamentary Choir under the name "Friends of Jo Cox" in tribute to the late MP who had been murdered earlier in the year. A 6-minute full version of the track and a 4-minute edit, together with a video, were released by Chrysalis Records on 16 December with all proceeds going to charity. In support of the initiative, the composers of the song, Mick Jagger and Keith Richards, waived their royalties. The single peaked at number 2 on the Official Independent Singles Breakers Chart.

In 2018, they finished recording a new mini-album with the producer Robin Millar, entitled MP4 - EP5. The album was released on 25 October by Revolver Records and is also available on iTunes.

In 2024, they returned to the recording studio and started work on a new, and as yet unnamed single, written by Kevin Brennan and arranged by the group. An early 2025 release date is anticipated.

== Appearances and achievements ==
In July 2007, the band backed Feargal Sharkey, formerly of the Undertones, in his first stage appearance in over 15 years, when he sang "Teenage Kicks" at the annual Rock The Boat party hosted by the British Phonographic Industry.

In 2008, MP4 was the subject of a special television short biography programme made by Sky and broadcast on the Sky Arts channel during the year.

In January 2009, MP4 made a guest appearance on the BBC1 TV programme Your Country Needs You with the winning UK Eurovision hopeful Jade Ewen and the other two finalist acts, the Twins and Mark Evans. MP4 gave Ewen some tips on "how to win votes".

In December 2009, they became the first rock group to play at the Palace of Westminster when they performed a sell-out concert on the terrace of the House of Commons. For an encore, they were joined once again on stage by Feargal Sharkey, who reprised his Undertones' hit "Teenage Kicks".

In September 2010, they performed at the Labour Party Conference in support of UK Music at a sell-out concert at the Night and Day Cafe in Manchester.

On New Year's Eve 2010, they performed at a sell-out concert for MPs, peers and their guests, once again on the Terrace of the House of Commons. They were introduced to the celebrity audience (including amongst others government ministers, the actor Ross Kemp and the Welsh singer Duffy) by the Speaker of the House of Commons, John Bercow MP.

In December 2011, they were recognised as the Alternative Parliamentary Entertainers of the Year at the fourth annual GovNet Awards held in the House of Lords.

In May 2012, MP4 became the first musicians to perform in the 900-year-old Westminster Hall. The oldest building on the UK Parliamentary estate, Westminster Hall has played a central role in British history, famously being the venue for the trial of King Charles I. On 24 May 2012, MP4 entertained an audience of approximately 1,000 including MPs, peers and parliamentary staff.

In March 2013, they appeared at a sell-out concert in central London organised to raise funds for Macmillan Cancer Support. During their set, they were joined on stage by the former Radio One DJ Mike Read, who performed the Cliff Richard hit "The Young Ones" with the group.

In March 2014, they performed a special 10th anniversary concert at The Bedford music venue in London. They were joined on stage by Tony Moore of the Cutting Crew who performed his group's million-selling hit "(I Just) Died in Your Arms" with MP4.

On 18 June 2014, at a band performance they were awarded a commemorative disc by the British music industry in recognition of their charitable fund raising, having raised over £1 million in the previous 10 years for numerous charitable causes including Macmillan Cancer Support. The award was presented to MP4 by Tony Wadsworth CBE and Geoff Taylor both of the British Phonographic Industry.

Commencing in September 2016, MP4 appeared as the regular house band on the satirical television show Unspun with Matt Forde, broadcast by Dave and starring the comedian Matt Forde. It is believed that this is the first time that a band of politicians has performed regularly for a television show.

On 25 October 2018, they launched an EP of original music, MP4 - EP5 with a concert in the State Rooms of the Speaker's House, as part of the Musicians Against Homelessness fundraising campaign.

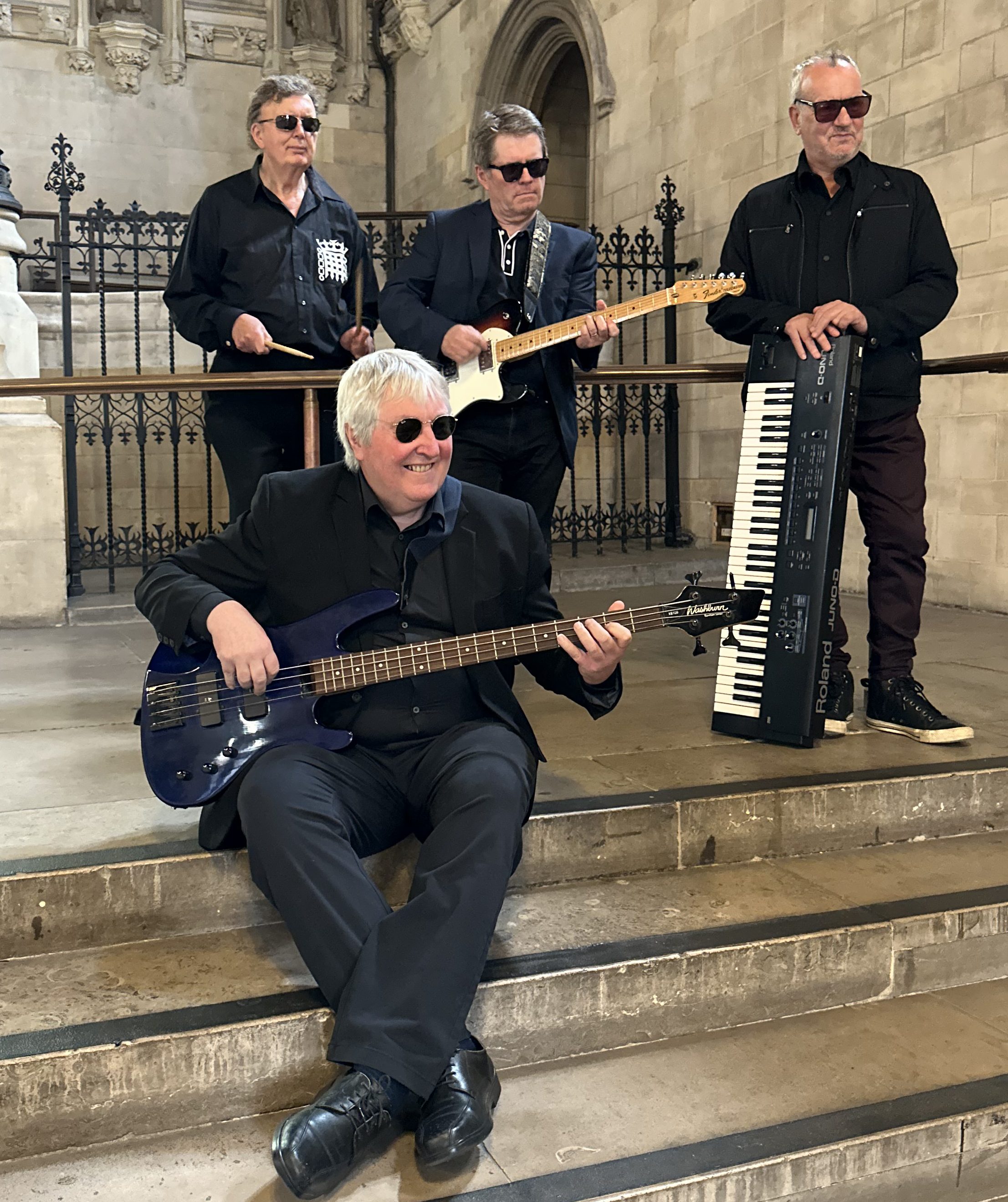
MP4 in Westminster Hall in 2023

On 14 November 2023, MP4 performed in the Speaker's State Rooms to a packed house of MPs, peers, ministers and invited guests to celebrate the 20th anniversary of their formation as a band. They were introduced by Feargal Sharkey.

== Discography ==
=== Albums ===
- House Music EP (2005) Busy Bee Records
- Cross Party (2010) Revolver Records
- MP4 - EP5 (2018) Revolver Records

=== Singles ===
- "You Can't Always Get What You Want" (2016) Chrysalis Records (track released under the artist title "The Friends of Jo Cox" and features MP4 with other artists)

== See also ==
- The Singing Senators
