= Norie-Miller baronets =

Extinct baronetcy in the Baronetage of the United Kingdom

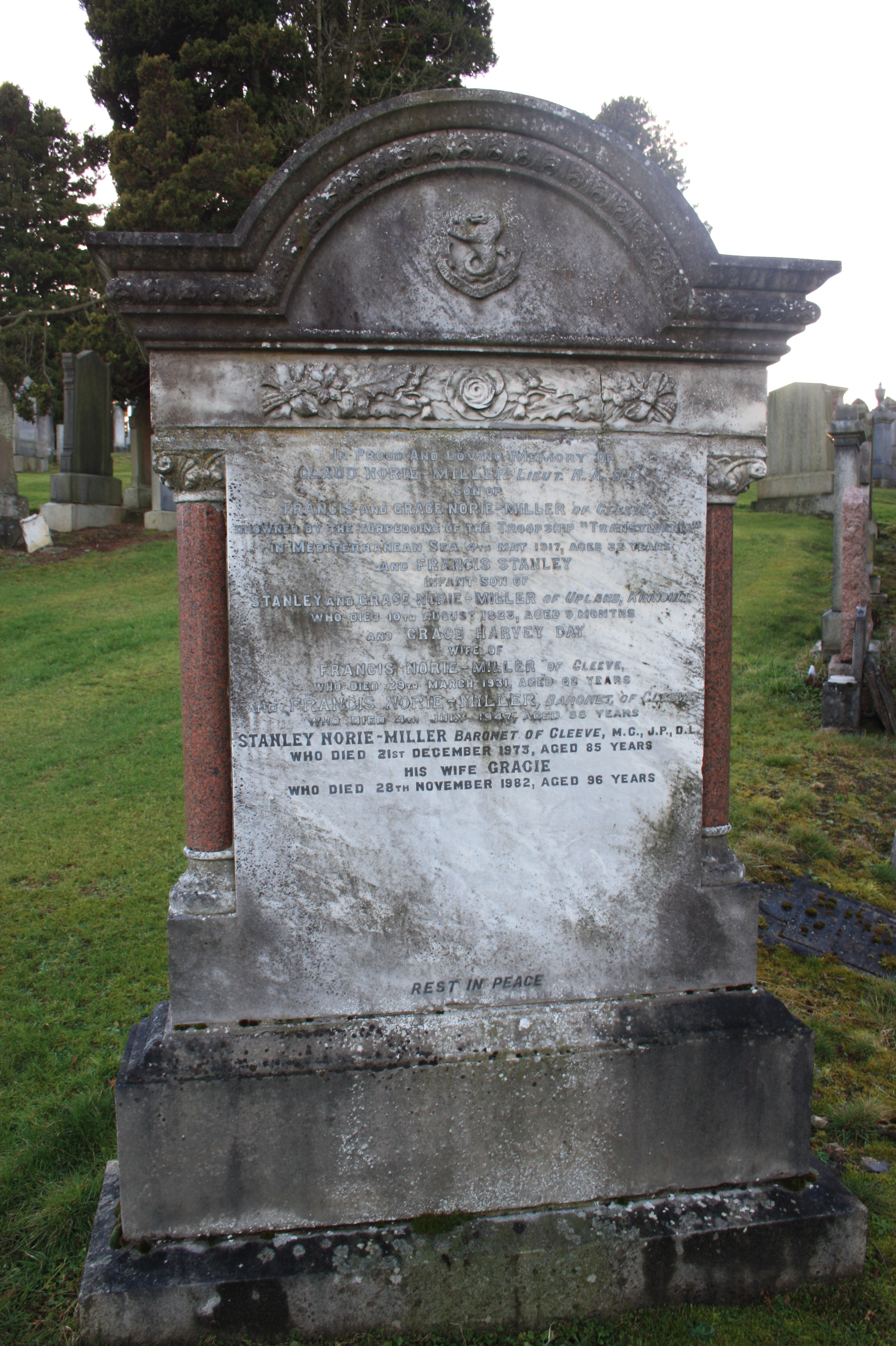
The Norie-Miller memorial, Wellshill Cemetery, Perth

The Norie-Miller Baronetcy, of Cleeve in the County of Perth, was a title in the Baronetage of the United Kingdom. It was created on 7 February 1936 for the insurance magnate and Liberal National politician Francis Norie-Miller. Claud Norie-Miller, the eldest son of Francis Norie-Miller, was killed on active service in the First World War in 1917 so the second Baronet was Francis' younger son, Stanley, who had followed him into the insurance business. Stanley inherited the title on his father's death on 4 July 1947 but, having no son, the baronetcy became extinct with his death in 1973.

== Norie-Miller baronets, of Cleeve (1936) ==
- Sir Francis Norie-Miller, 1st Baronet (1859–1947)
- Sir Stanley Norie-Miller, 2nd Baronet (1888–1973)

Both are buried together in Wellshill Cemetery in north Perth. The grave is on the eastern slope facing a north–south path.

Coat of arms of Norie-Miller of Cleeve
Crest A seal-lion Gules, supporting between the fins a maltese cross Or Escutcheon Azure, a saltire couped Argent, between two wolves heads erased in pale and as many garbs in fesse Or. Motto Fortiter ac fideliter

== See also ==
- Norie-Miller Walk
