= Pete Wishart =

Scottish politician

Pete Wishart MP
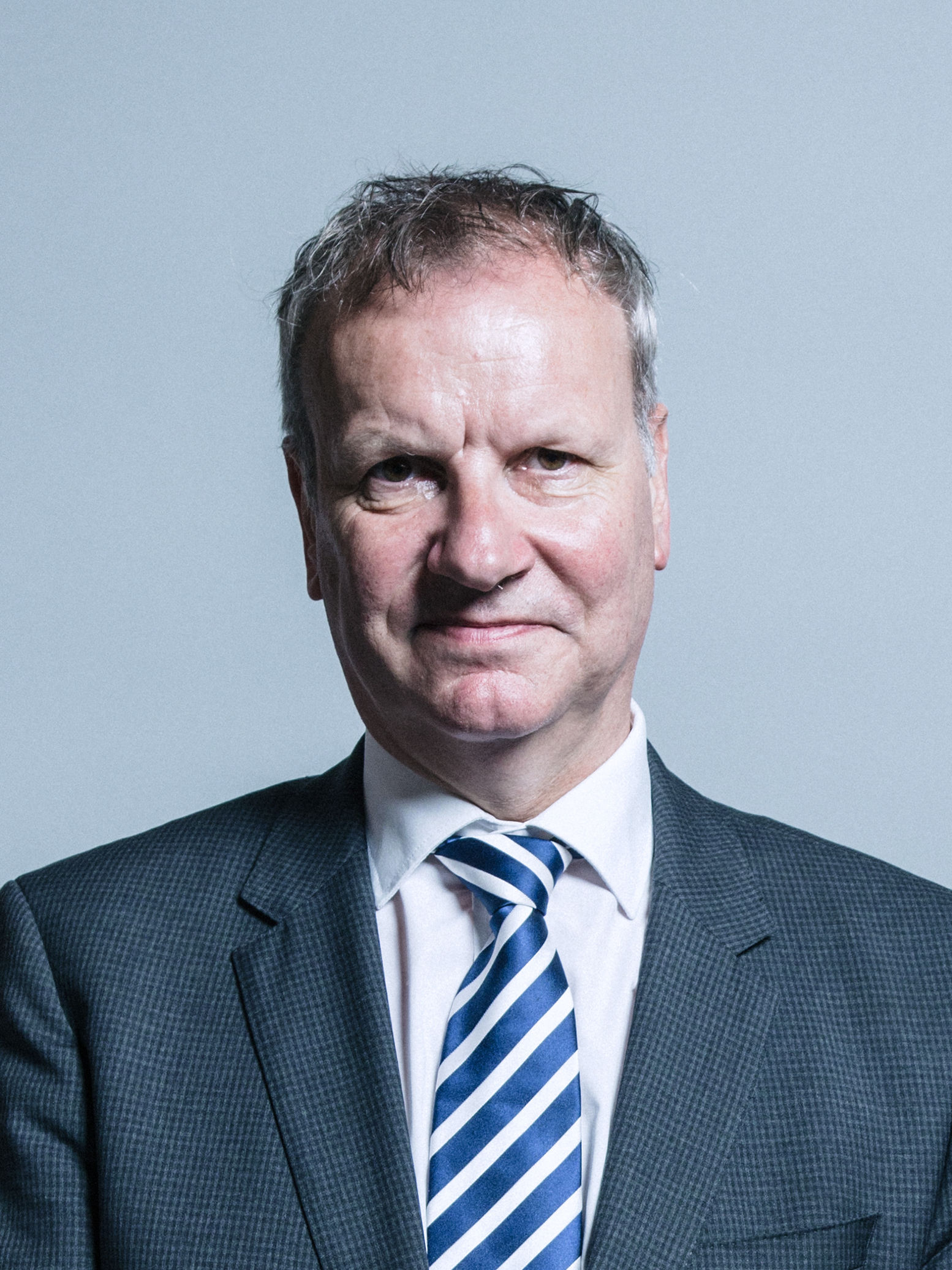
- Official portrait, 2017

Deputy Leader of the Scottish National Party in the House of Commons
- Incumbent
- Assumed office 10 July 2024
- Leader: Stephen Flynn; Dave Doogan
- Preceded by: Mhairi Black

Chair of the Scottish Affairs Select Committee
- In office 19 June 2015 – 30 May 2024
- Preceded by: Ian Davidson
- Succeeded by: Patricia Ferguson

Member of Parliament
- Incumbent
- Assumed office 7 June 2001
- Preceded by: John Swinney
- Constituency: North Tayside (2001–2005); Perth and North Perthshire (2005–2024); Perth and Kinross-shire (2024–present)
- Majority: 4,127 (8.2%)

Scottish National Party portfolios
- 2015–2020: Commons Business
- 2020–2021: Shadow Chancellor of the Duchy of Lancaster; Cabinet Office
- 2021–2022: Commons Business
- 2024–present: Constitution; Home Affairs

Personal details
- Born: 9 March 1962 (age 64) Dunfermline, Fife, Scotland
- Party: Scottish National Party
- Children: 1
- Education: Moray House College of Education
- Profession: Musician; community worker
- Website: www.petewishartmp.com
- Musical career
- Origin: Scotland
- Instrument: Keyboards
- Years active: 1981–present
- Formerly of: Big Country; Runrig; MP4

Peter Wishart (born 9 March 1962) is a Scottish National Party (SNP) politician and musician who has served as the Member of Parliament (MP) for Perth and Kinross-shire since 2024. He previously served as the MP for Perth and North Perthshire from 2005 to 2024 and North Tayside from 2001 to 2005.

Wishart is currently the SNP Shadow Leader of the House in the House of Commons and the chair of the Scottish Affairs Select Committee. He has previously served as the SNP's Westminster Spokesperson for the Constitution and for Culture and Sport and Chief Whip. He is also a former keyboard player of the Scottish Celtic rock bands Runrig and Big Country.

He is the longest currently-serving Scottish National Party MP, and the longest–serving of all time.

== Background ==
Born in Dunfermline in 1962, Wishart was educated at Queen Anne High School Dunfermline and Moray House College, Edinburgh. He now lives in Perth, has one son, and enjoys walking in the Perthshire hills. He is a trained community worker and has been a director of the Fast Forward charity that promotes healthy lifestyles for young people. He was a member of the Scotland Against Drugs Campaign Committee and has contributed to many national forums looking at the problem of drugs within Scottish society.

== Music ==
For 15 years Wishart was a member of the Scottish Celtic rock group Runrig.

His first major band was Big Country, which he joined in the early 1980s along with his brother Alan. He initially joined during a period when Big Country were a support act for Alice Cooper's tour. The main force behind Big Country was Stuart Adamson, himself from near Dunfermline. Adamson claimed that the early Big Country were thrown off the Alice Cooper tour for "being too weird".

In 1986 Wishart appeared on Kingfishers Catch Fire EP Radio Kampala with Clive Parker, playing on two songs, "Bella" and "Battle Scars".

After the departure of Richard Cherns in February 1986, Wishart joined Runrig. Wishart was a performer on seven of Runrig's studio albums, from The Cutter and the Clan (1987), to his last The Stamping Ground (2001). He also appears on several of Runrig's live albums. Wishart's tenure in the band coincided with their sign-up to the Chrysalis Records label, and their most successfully commercial period in the late 1980s and early 1990s. Wishart was not the only politically minded member of the band – former lead singer Donnie Munro became a Labour Party candidate.

Wishart is a founder member of the parliamentary rock group MP4. The other members are Ian Cawsey (bass guitar and vocals), Greg Knight (drums) and Kevin Brennan (lead guitar and vocals).

== House of Commons ==
He was first elected to the House of Commons at the 2001 general election, taking John Swinney's old seat of North Tayside. Since arriving at Westminster, he has served as the SNP's Chief Whip, in which role he has pressed the government for greater parliamentary rights, such as better representation on committees, for both the SNP and other minor political parties. He has also campaigned for copyright term extension and is a vice-chair of the All Party Parliamentary Intellectual Property Group.

In 2003, he voted against parliamentary approval for the invasion of Iraq.

In the light of the reduction in the number of Scottish MPs at Westminster, Wishart's former constituency was abolished in a radical boundary revision, and at the 2005 general election; he won the new constituency of Perth and North Perthshire for the SNP with a majority of 1,521 over Douglas Taylor of the Conservatives. The Perth and North Perthshire constituency was created after boundary changes in Scotland and takes in East and Highland Perthshire, the City of Perth and the Carse of Gowrie. Wishart sat on the Scottish Affairs Select Committee.

In November 2010, Wishart suggested that Scottish football referees should declare which club sides they support.

In August 2014, Wishart confidently predicted that Alex Salmond would beat Alistair Darling in a televised debate about Scottish independence, telling journalists that "the slaughter will be worse than the Bannockburn re-enactment". Salmond quizzed Darling, among other things, about alien invasion, while Darling questioned him about what currency an independent Scotland would use. An exit poll suggested most viewers thought Darling had won the debate and journalists panned Salmond's performance.

In January 2015, Wishart secured and started a debate on the reform of the House of Lords.

Politically, he is well known for campaigning to demolish the historic and listed Perth City Hall, dating from 1911, and replace it with an open square. He has described the building as "unused, unloved and increasingly unwelcome", "a building whose time has passed", and said that, "A city square will allow us to attract visitors, grow our café quarter, put on outdoor events and properly organise civic and community events. Every city needs civic space and we must ensure that we will soon have ours."

Following the 2015 general election, it was announced in June 2015 that he would chair the Scottish Affairs Select Committee, with his appointment formally announced on 19 June 2015. At the snap 2017 general election, he retained his seat by a very marginal majority, beating Conservative Ian Duncan by just 21 votes. The Daily Telegraph described Wishart's win as "a rare bright moment for the Nationalists" in an election that saw the SNP vote plummet and pro-Union parties gain 21 seats.

In 2016, Wishart suggested to the House of Commons the possibility of the Palace of Westminster being turned into a tourist attraction and for Parliament to move to a more modern building.

Wishart said publicly, in September 2017, that because voters were "weary of constitutional change" there should be no second referendum on Scottish independence for that parliament, but that the SNP should seek a mandate for a new one in the 2021 Scottish parliament election. In October 2017, Wishart told an Institute of Economic Affairs conference that federalism for the UK should be welcomed "as part of that conversation" in Scotland, although he stressed federalism would not see Scotland "equal to some region of England".

In January 2018, Wishart drew media attention for holding up a placard which read "nul points" in the House of Commons, after having asked Prime Minister Theresa May how she would rate her government's handling of Brexit from one to ten. After May had answered, Wishart received a warning by Speaker of the House John Bercow for the stunt.

In February 2018, he warned that the SNP risked alienating Scottish voters who had voted "Leave" in the 2016 referendum on European Union membership. In an article for The National, he wrote that his party had to "face up" to the reality that Scotland would be leaving the European Union, and made the case for an alternative vision of Scottish independence which involved a "graduated" re-entry to the European Union from "EEA, then EFTA then full EU membership", stressing that the final step of re-joining the EU should only be done with the "full consent of an independent Scottish Parliament". Later in February, he ruled himself out of the 2018 Scottish Depute Leadership election following the resignation of Angus Robertson. Wishart concluded that he did not have "sufficient support" to run for the Depute Leadership of the Scottish National Party.

In March 2024, he criticised Humza Yousaf's election strategy saying he won't use any "Tory-free rhetoric" in his campaign for the 2024 general election.

== Discography ==
=== Singles ===
Runrig

- "Alba / Worker for the Wind" (1987), Chrysalis Records
- "Protect and Survive" (1988), Chrysalis Records
- "News from Heaven" (1989), Chrysalis Records
- "Every River" (1989), Chrysalis Records
- "Flower of the West" (1991), Chrysalis Records
- "Wonderful"(1993), Chrysalis Records
- "The Greatest Flame" (1993), Chrysalis Records
- "Song of the Earth" (1993), Chrysalis Records
- "This Time of Year" (1994), Chrysalis Records
- "An Ubhal as Àirde (The Highest Apple)" (1995), Chrysalis Records
- "Things That Are" (1995), Chrysalis Records
- "Rhythm of My Heart" (1996), Chrysalis Records
- "The Greatest Flame (1996 remix)", Chrysalis Records
- "The Message" (1999), Chrysalis Records
- "Maymorning" (1999), Chrysalis Records
- "Big Sky" (1999), Chrysalis Records
- "This Is Not a Love Song" (1999), Chrysalis Records
- "Book of Golden Stories" (2001), Chrysalis Records

MP4

- "House Music" (2005), Busy Bee Records
- "You Can't Always Get What You Want" (2016) Chrysalis Records (track released under the artist title 'The Friends of Jo Cox' and features MP4 with other artists)

=== EPs ===
Kingfishers Catch Fire

- Radio Kampala (1986), Furry Records

Runrig

- Capture the Heart (1990), Chrysalis Records
- Hearthammer (1991), Chrysalis Records
- Flower of the West (1991), Chrysalis Records

=== Studio albums ===
Runrig

Year	Album	Peak chart positions			Certification	Notes
Year	Album	UK	DEN	GER	Certification	Notes
1987	The Cutter and the Clan	45	—	—	BPI: Silver	Original 1987 release on Ridge Records; re-released on Chrysalis 1988
1989	Searchlight	11	—	—	BPI: Gold	
1991	The Big Wheel	4	—	—	BPI: Gold	
1993	Amazing Things	2	—	47	BPI: Silver	
1995	Mara	24	—	81	BPI: Silver	
1999	In Search of Angels	29	—	26		
2001	The Stamping Ground	64	33	20		

MP4

- Cross Party (2010) Revolver Records

=== Live albums ===
Runrig

Year	Album	Peak positions			Certification	Notes
Year	Album	UK	DEN	GER	Certification	Notes
1988	Once in a Lifetime	61	—	—	BPI: Gold	
1994	Transmitting Live	41	—	67		
2000	Live at Celtic Connections 2000	168	—	48		
2020	One Legend – Two Concerts Live at Rockpalast 1996 & 2001	–	—	–		

Note: This table shows commercial live releases. Other live audio material has been released in the "Access All Areas" series for the official Runrig Fan Club.

=== Compilation albums and box sets ===
Big Country

- And in the Beginning (2012), Furry Records

Runrig

- Alba – The Best of Runrig (1992), Chrysalis Records
- Long Distance – The Best of Runrig (1996), Chrysalis Records
- Beat The Drum (1998), EMI Gold
- The Gaelic Collection (1998), Ridge Records
- The Runrig Collection (1998), EMI
- Scotland's Pride – Runrig's best (1999), Chrysalis Records
- BBC – The Archive Series (1999), EMI
- Celtic Glory (1999), Connoisseur Collection
- Scotland's Glory – Runrig's Ballads (2000), Ridge Records
- 30 Year Journey – The Best (2004), Ridge Records
- 50 Great Songs (2010), Ridge Records
- Stepping Down The Glory Road – The Chrysalis Years (2013), Chrysalis Records
- Rarities (2018), RCA

Parliament of the United Kingdom
Preceded by John Swinney	Member of Parliament for North Tayside; 2001–2005	Constituency abolished
Constituency established	Member of Parliament for Perth and North Perthshire; 2005–2024	Constituency abolished
Constituency established	Member of Parliament for Perth and Kinross-shire; 2024–present	Incumbent
