= Perth (UK Parliament constituency) =

UK Parliament constituency (1997–2005)

- Former county constituency for the House of Commons
- Boundary of Perth in Scotland for the 2001 general election
- Subdivision: Perth and Kinross

1997–2005
- Seats: One
- Created from: Perth and Kinross
- Replaced by: Ochil & South Perthshire; Perth & North Perthshire

1918–1950
- Seats: One
- Type of constituency: County constituency
- Created from: East Perthshire
- Replaced by: Perth and East Perthshire

1832–1918
- Seats: One
- Type of constituency: Burgh constituency
- Created from: Perthshire; Perth Burghs

Perth was a constituency of the House of Commons of the Parliament of the United Kingdom from 1832 to 1918, 1918 to 1950, and 1997 to 2005. From 1832 to 1918 it was a burgh constituency. From 1918 to 1950, and 1997 to 2005, it was a county constituency. During each of the three periods it elected one Member of Parliament (MP).

== Boundaries ==
=== Boundaries 1832 to 1918 ===
As created by the Representation of the People (Scotland) Act 1832, and first used in the 1832 general election, the constituency included the burgh of Perth and was one of two constituencies covering the county of Perth. The other was the Perthshire constituency (except that five detached parishes of the county were within the Clackmannanshire and Kinross-shire constituency).

The boundaries of the constituency, as set out in the Representation of the People (Scotland) Act 1832, were-

"From the North-western Corner of the North Inch, on the Right Bank of the River Tay, in a straight Line to the Bridge on the Mill Lead at the Boot of Balhousie; thence in a straight Line to the Bridge on the Glasgow Road over the Scouring Burn; thence in a straight Line to the Southern Corner of the Water Reservoir of the Dept; thence in a straight Line to the Southern Corner of the Friarton Pier on the River Tay; thence across the River Tay (passing to the South of the Friarton Island) to the Point at which the same is met by the Boundary of the respective Parishes of Kinfauns and Kinnoul; thence, Northward, along the Boundary of the Parish of Kinfauns to the Point at which the several Boundaries of the Properties of Kinfauns, Kinnoul, and Barnhill meet; thence in a straight Line to the North-eastern Corner of Lord Kinnoul's Lodge, at the Gate of Approach to Kinnoul Hill; thence in a straight Line to the North-eastern Corner of the Enclosure of the Lunatic Asylum; thence in a straight Line to the Point at which the Annatty Burn crosses the Blairgowrie Road; thence down the Annatty Burn to the Point at which the same joins the River Tay; thence in a straight Line to the Point first described."

Prior to the 1832 general election, the county (including the detached parishes) had been covered by the Perthshire constituency and Perth Burghs. Perth Burghs consisted of the burgh of Perth and burghs in the county of Fife and the county of Forfar.

The 1832 boundaries of the Perth constituency were used also in the general elections of 1835, 1837, 1841, 1847, 1852, 1857, 1859, 1865, 1868, 1874 and 1880.

The Redistribution of Seats Act 1885 divided the Perthshire constituency to create Eastern Perthshire and Western Perthshire. There was no change to the boundaries of the Perth constituency. Therefore, the 1832 boundaries of the Perth constituency were used again in the general elections of 1885, 1886, 1892, 1895, 1900, 1906, January 1910 and December 1910.

=== Boundaries 1918 to 1950 ===
By 1918 county boundaries had been redefined under the Local Government (Scotland) Act 1889 and, in creating new constituency boundaries, the Representation of the People Act 1918 took account of new local government boundaries. The Perth constituency became one of two county constituencies covering the county of Perth and the county of Kinross, and was first used as such in the 1918 general election. The other constituency was Kinross and West Perthshire.

The Perth constituency was defined as consisting of the burghs of Abernethy, Alyth, Blairgowrie, Coupar Angus, Perth, and Rattray in the county of Perth and the Blairgowrie and Perth districts of the county, and the same boundaries were used for the general elections of 1922, 1923, 1924, 1929, 1931, 1935 and 1945.

For the 1950 general election the constituency was replaced by the Perth and East Perthshire constituency, which was defined by the House of Commons (Redistribution of Seats) Act 1949 to have exactly the same boundaries as the former Perth constituency.

=== 1997 to 2005 ===
For the 1997 general election Perth was recreated, and was a constituency entirely within the Perth and Kinross council area, which had been established the year before, under the Local Government etc (Scotland) Act 1994. The council area was otherwise covered by North Tayside to the north, which also covered part of the Angus council area, Angus to the east, which also covered part of the Angus council area and part of the Dundee City council area, and Ochil to the south, which also covered the Clackmannanshire council area and part of the Stirling council area.

The same boundaries were used for the 2001 general election.

For the 2005 general election, the Perth constituency was largely replaced by Ochil and South Perthshire, covering the Clackmannanshire council area and a southern portion of the Perth and Kinross council area. Perth and North Perthshire was created to cover the rest of the Perth and Kinross council area.

== Members of Parliament ==
=== MPs 1832–1918 ===
Election	Member	Party
1832	Laurence Oliphant	Whig
1837	Arthur Kinnaird	Whig
1839 by-election	David Greig	Whig
1841	Hon. Fox Maule	Whig
1852 by-election	Arthur Kinnaird	Whig
1859	Arthur Kinnaird	Liberal
1878 by-election	Charles Stuart Parker	Liberal
1885	Charles Stuart Parker	Independent Liberal
1886	Charles Stuart Parker	Liberal
1892	William Whitelaw	Conservative
1895	Robert Wallace	Liberal
1907 by-election	Sir Robert Pullar	Liberal
1910 (January)	Frederick Whyte	Liberal
1918	Constituency abolished	

=== MPs 1918–1950 ===
Election	Member	Party	Notes
1918	William Young	Coalition Liberal	Member for East Perthshire (1910–18)
Jan 1922	William Young	National Liberal	
Nov 1922	Noel Skelton	Unionist	
1923	Robert Macgregor Mitchell	Liberal	
1924	Noel Skelton	Unionist	From 1931, MP for the Combined Scottish Universities
1931	Mungo Murray	Unionist	Later 7th Earl of Mansfield and Mansfield
1935 by-election	Francis Norie-Miller	National Liberal	
1935	Sir Thomas Hunter	Unionist	
1945	Alan Gomme-Duncan	Unionist	Contested Perth and East Perthshire following redistribution
1950	Constituency abolished		

=== MPs 1997–2005 ===
Election	Member	Party	Notes
1997	Roseanna Cunningham	Scottish National Party	previously MP for Perth and Kinross
2001	Annabelle Ewing	Scottish National Party	daughter of Winnie Ewing
2005	constituency abolished		

== Election results ==
=== 1832 to 1918 ===
General Election 1832: Perth
Party	Candidate	Votes	%
Whig	Laurence Oliphant	458	69.1
Whig	Patrick Crichton-Stuart	205	30.9
Majority		253	38.2
Turnout		663	85.0
Registered electors		780	
Whig win (new seat)			

General Election 1835: Perth
Party	Candidate	Votes	%
Whig	Laurence Oliphant	Unopposed	
Registered electors		874	
Whig hold			

General Election 1837: Perth
Party	Candidate	Votes	%
Whig	Arthur Kinnaird	355	65.4
Conservative	Patrick Murray Threipland	188	34.6
Majority		167	30.8
Turnout		543	60.3
Registered electors		900	
Whig hold			

Kinnaird's resignation caused a by-election.

By-election, 19 August 1839: Perth
Party	Candidate	Votes	%	±%
Whig	David Greig (MP)	9	100.0	N/A
Whig	Laurence Oliphant	0	0.0	N/A
Majority		9	100.0	+69.2
Turnout		9	c. 1.0	c. −59.3
Registered electors		c. 900		
Whig hold		Swing	N/A	

General Election 1841: Perth
Party	Candidate	Votes	%	±%
Whig	Fox Maule	356	61.1	−4.3
Conservative	William Fechney Black	227	38.9	+4.3
Majority		129	22.2	−8.6
Turnout		583	53.9	−6.4
Registered electors		1,082		
Whig hold		Swing	−4.3	

Maule was appointed Secretary at War, requiring a by-election.

By-election, 11 July 1846: Perth
Party	Candidate	Votes	%	±%
Whig	Fox Maule	Unopposed		
Whig hold				

General Election 1847: Perth
Party	Candidate	Votes	%	±%
Whig	Fox Maule	Unopposed		
Registered electors		1,030		
Whig hold				

Maule was appointed President of the Board of Control, requiring a by-election.

By-election, 9 February 1852: Perth
Party	Candidate	Votes	%	±%
Whig	Fox Maule	Unopposed		
Whig hold				

Maule succeeded to the peerage, becoming Lord Panmure and causing a by-election.

By-election, 15 May 1852: Perth
Party	Candidate	Votes	%	±%
Whig	Arthur Kinnaird	325	59.1	N/A
Radical	Charles Gilpin	225	40.9	N/A
Majority		100	18.2	N/A
Turnout		550	53.2	N/A
Registered electors		1,034		
Whig hold		Swing	N/A	

General election 1852: Perth
Party	Candidate	Votes	%	±%
Whig	Arthur Kinnaird	Unopposed		
Registered electors		1,034		
Whig hold				

General election 1857: Perth
Party	Candidate	Votes	%	±%
Whig	Arthur Kinnaird	Unopposed		
Registered electors		947		
Whig hold				

General election 1859: Perth
Party	Candidate	Votes	%	±%
Liberal	Arthur Kinnaird	Unopposed		
Registered electors		966		
Liberal hold				

General election 1865: Perth
Party	Candidate	Votes	%	±%
Liberal	Arthur Kinnaird	Unopposed		
Registered electors		982		
Liberal hold				

General election 1868: Perth
Party	Candidate	Votes	%	±%
Liberal	Arthur Kinnaird	Unopposed		
Registered electors		2,801		
Liberal hold				

General election 1874: Perth
Party	Candidate	Votes	%	±%
Liberal	Arthur Kinnaird	1,648	63.7	N/A
Conservative	Charles Scott	940	36.3	New
Majority		708	27.4	N/A
Turnout		2,588	67.0	N/A
Registered electors		3,863		
Liberal hold		Swing	N/A	

Kinnaird succeeded to the peerage, becoming Lord Kinnaird.

By-election, 29 Jan 1878: Perth
Party	Candidate	Votes	%	±%
Liberal	Charles Stuart Parker	2,206	72.1	+8.4
Conservative	Alexander Mackie	855	27.9	−8.4
Majority		1,351	44.2	+16.8
Turnout		3,061	72.5	+5.5
Registered electors		4,224		
Liberal hold		Swing	+8.4	

General election 1880: Perth
Party	Candidate	Votes	%	±%
Liberal	Charles Stuart Parker	2,315	74.9	+11.2
Conservative	David Robertson Williamson	774	25.1	−11.2
Majority		1,541	49.8	+22.4
Turnout		3,089	77.2	+10.2
Registered electors		4,000		
Liberal hold		Swing	+11.2	

General election 1885: Perth
Party	Candidate	Votes	%	±%
Independent Liberal	Charles Stuart Parker	1,652	44.4	−30.5
Conservative	John Chisholm	1,099	29.6	+4.5
Liberal	Alexander Macdougall junior	967	26.0	−48.9
Majority		553	14.8	N/A
Turnout		3,718	85.1	+7.9
Registered electors		4,369		
Independent Liberal gain from Liberal		Swing		

General election 1886: Perth
Party	Candidate	Votes	%	±%
Liberal	Charles Stuart Parker	1,573	58.4	+32.4
Liberal Unionist	William Fowler	1,120	41.6	+12.0
Majority		453	16.8	N/A
Turnout		2,693	61.6	−23.5
Registered electors		4,369		
Liberal gain from Independent Liberal		Swing		

General election 1892: Perth
Party	Candidate	Votes	%	±%
Conservative	William Whitelaw	1,398	40.2	−1.4
Liberal	Charles Stuart Parker	1,171	33.7	−24.7
Perth Liberal and Radical Association	James Woollen	907	26.1	New
Majority		227	6.5	N/A
Turnout		3,476	81.3	+19.7
Registered electors		4,274		
Conservative gain from Liberal		Swing	+11.7	

General election 1895: Perth
Party	Candidate	Votes	%	±%
Liberal	Robert Wallace	2,137	54.8	+21.1
Conservative	William Whitelaw	1,763	45.2	+5.0
Majority		374	9.6	N/A
Turnout		3,900	87.5	+6.2
Registered electors		4,456		
Liberal gain from Conservative		Swing	+8.1	

Wallace

General election 1900: Perth
Party	Candidate	Votes	%	±%
Liberal	Robert Wallace	2,171	54.3	−0.5
Conservative	William Whitelaw	1,827	45.7	+0.5
Majority		344	8.6	−1.0
Turnout		3,998	82.0	−5.5
Registered electors		4,873		
Liberal hold		Swing	−0.5	

General election 1906: Perth
Party	Candidate	Votes	%	±%
Liberal	Robert Wallace	2,875	60.6	+6.3
Conservative	Samuel Chapman	1,867	39.4	−6.3
Majority		1,008	21.2	+12.6
Turnout		4,742	87.8	+5.8
Registered electors		5,398		
Liberal hold		Swing	+6.3	

By-election, Perth 1907
Party	Candidate	Votes	%	±%
Liberal	Robert Pullar	Unopposed		
Liberal hold				

General election January 1910: Perth
Party	Candidate	Votes	%	±%
Liberal	Frederick Whyte	2,841	57.5	−3.1
Conservative	Samuel Chapman	2,103	42.5	+3.1
Majority		738	15.0	−6.2
Turnout		4,944	91.0	+3.2
Registered electors		5,433		
Liberal hold		Swing	−3.1	

General election December 1910: Perth
Party	Candidate	Votes	%	±%
Liberal	Frederick Whyte	2,852	60.3	+2.8
Conservative	Charles Telfer-Smollett	1,878	39.7	−2.8
Majority		974	20.6	+5.6
Turnout		4,730	85.8	−5.2
Registered electors		5,514		
Liberal hold		Swing	+2.8	

=== 1918 to 1930 ===
William Young

General election 1918: Perth
Party		Candidate	Votes	%
C	National Liberal	William Young	Unopposed	
	National Liberal win (new boundaries)			
C indicates candidate endorsed by the coalition government.

General election 1922: Perth
Party	Candidate	Votes	%	±%
Unionist	Noel Skelton	11,387	46.3	New
Liberal	William Henderson	5,874	23.9	N/A
Labour	William Westwood	4,651	18.9	New
National Liberal	William Robert Gourlay	2,689	10.9	N/A
Majority		5,513	22.4	N/A
Turnout		24,601	71.1	N/A
Registered electors		34,590		
Unionist gain from National Liberal		Swing	N/A	

General election 1923: Perth
Party	Candidate	Votes	%	±%
Liberal	Robert MacGregor Mitchell	12,655	53.2	+29.3
Unionist	Noel Skelton	11,134	46.8	+0.5
Majority		1,521	6.4	N/A
Turnout		23,789	68.7	−2.4
Registered electors		34,635		
Liberal gain from Unionist		Swing	+14.4	

General election 1924: Perth
Party	Candidate	Votes	%	±%
Unionist	Noel Skelton	13,022	49.4	+2.6
Liberal	Robert MacGregor Mitchell	7,998	30.4	−22.8
Labour	Cameron Roberts	5,316	20.2	New
Majority		5,024	19.0	N/A
Turnout		26,336	75.3	+6.6
Registered electors		34,992		
Unionist gain from Liberal		Swing	+12.7	

General election 1929: Perth
Party	Candidate	Votes	%	±%
Unionist	Noel Skelton	14,229	40.4	−9.0
Liberal	Francis Norie-Miller	12,699	36.1	+5.7
Labour	Helen Gault	8,291	23.5	+3.3
Majority		1,530	4.3	−14.7
Turnout		35,219	76.7	+1.4
Registered electors		45,923		
Unionist hold		Swing	−7.4	

=== 1930s ===
General election 1931: Perth
Party	Candidate	Votes	%	±%
Unionist	Mungo Murray	19,254	50.2	+9.8
Liberal	Francis Norie-Miller	15,396	40.1	+4.0
Labour	Helen E Gault	3,705	9.7	−14.2
Majority		3,858	10.1	+5.8
Turnout		38,355	81.4	+4.7
Unionist hold		Swing		

1935 Perth by-election
Party	Candidate	Votes	%	±%
National Liberal	Francis Norie-Miller	17,516	68.7	+18.5
Labour	Adam McKinlay	7,984	31.3	+21.6
Majority		9,532	37.4	N/A
Turnout		25,500		
National Liberal gain from Unionist		Swing		

General election 1935: Perth
Party	Candidate	Votes	%	±%
Unionist	Thomas Hunter	23,011	73.7	+23.5
Labour	Robert Gunn	8,209	26.3	+16.6
Majority		14,802	47.4	+37.3
Turnout		31,220	64.1	−17.3
Unionist gain from National Liberal		Swing		

=== 1940s ===
General election 1945: Perth
Party	Candidate	Votes	%	±%
Unionist	Alan Gomme-Duncan	22,484	63.1	−10.6
Labour	William Hughes	11,617	32.6	+6.3
SNP	James Blair Brown	1,547	4.3	New
Majority		10,867	30.5	−16.9
Turnout		35,648	65.7	+1.6
Unionist hold		Swing	-8.5	

=== 1997 to 2005 ===
General election 1997: Perth
Party	Candidate	Votes	%	±%
SNP	Roseanna Cunningham	16,209	36.4	
Conservative	John Godfrey	13,068	29.3	
Labour	Douglas Alexander	11,036	24.8	
Liberal Democrats	Chic Brodie	3,583	8.0	
Referendum	Robert McAuley	366	0.8	
UKIP	Matthew Henderson	289	0.6	
Majority		3,141	7.1	
Turnout		44,551	73.9	
SNP win (new seat)				

General election 2001: Perth
Party	Candidate	Votes	%	±%
SNP	Annabelle Ewing	11,237	29.7	−6.7
Conservative	Liz Smith	11,189	29.6	+0.3
Labour	Marion Dingwall	9,638	25.5	+0.7
Liberal Democrats	Vicki Harris	4,853	12.8	+4.8
Scottish Socialist	Frank Byrne	899	2.4	New
Majority		48	0.1	−7.0
Turnout		37,816	61.5	−12.4
SNP hold		Swing	-7.0	
