= Mara (album) =

Studio album by Runrig
- Released: 6 November 1995
- Genre: Celtic rock
- Length: 48:29
- Label: Chrysalis
- Producer: Runrig, Brian Young

Runrig chronology
Amazing Things (1993)	Mara (1995)	In Search of Angels (1999)

Mara is the ninth album by Scottish Celtic rock group Runrig, released on 6 November 1995 by Chrysalis Records. It spawned only one single "Things That Are", which reached the top ten in their native Scotland, and number forty in the United Kingdom.

== Release and promotion ==
The title of the album, Mara, comes from the Scottish Gaelic name, meaning "of the sea". In keeping with this title, much of the album has a broadly maritime theme. The album serves as the final album to feature lead singer Donnie Munro on vocals. Munro would leave Runrig in 1997 to pursue a career in politics.

Mara was released by Chrysalis Records in the United Kingdom and Germany, and by Avalanche in the United States. In 2014, it was re–released in a repackaged box set containing four other studio albums released by the band during their tenure with Chrysalis. The album was the fifth album to be released by the band under Chrysalis, and became their final album to be released by the label.

The album debuted at number twenty-four in the United Kingdom, spending a total of six weeks within the UK Top 100. In their native Scotland, it peaked at number three on the Scottish Albums Chart, and eighty one in Germany, spending a total of seven weeks within the Top 100 of the German Albums Chart.

Mara was certified Silver by the British Phonographic Industry (BPI) in 2013, indicating sales in excess of 60,000 copies.

== Recording ==
During the recording sessions for Mara, the band were joined by various sessions musicians to provide music and instrumentals to the albums tracks. Andy Shephard joined the band during the recording sessions, providing soprano saxophone alongside Joe Locke who provided vibes. Backing vocals were provided by Lorna Bannon, Billy Rankin and Amanda Lyon, with Lisa Sinclair providing additional lead vocals alongside Donnie Munro. Additionally, The Royal Scottish National Orchestra provided string sections, arranged by Eddie MacGuire, and The Glasgow Hebridean Gaelic Choir, conducted by Raibert McCallum, once again joined the band as they had done with their previous studio album.

== Singles ==
=== Things That Are ===
"Things That Are"

Single by Runrig

from the album Mara
- B-side: "Amazing Things (Remix)"
- Released: 1995
- Studio: Castlesound Studios, Edinburgh, Scotland
- Label: Chrysalis – CDCHS 5018
- Songwriter(s): C. Macdonald; R. Macdonald
- Producer(s): Calum Malcolm

Runrig singles chronology
"An Ubhal as Àirde (The Highest Apple)" (1995)	"Things That Are" (1995)	"Rhythm of My Heart" (1996)

"Things That Are" is a 1995 single released by Runrig, released as the lead and only single from the album. A commercial success for the band in their native Scotland, it debuted at number nine on the Scottish Singles Chart. It debuted at number forty in the United Kingdom where it remained for two weeks before falling to number sixty-eight in its second and final week.

== Track listing ==
1. "Day in a Boat" - 2:56
2. "Nothing but the Sun" - 7:15
3. "The Mighty Atlantic" / "Mara Theme" - 6:43
4. "Things That Are" - 4:55
5. "Road and the River" - 4:29
6. "Meadhan Oidhche air an Acairseid" (Midnight on the Harbour) - 4:53
7. "The Wedding" - 4:11
8. "The Dancing Floor" - 5:29
9. "Thairis air a' Ghleann" (Beyond the Glen) - 3:48
10. "Lighthouse" - 3:50

=== CD single (UK) ===
1. "Things That Are" – 4:25
2. "Amazing Things" (Remix) – 4:37
3. "That Other Landscape" – 3:45
4. "An Ubhal as Àirde (The Highest Apple)" – 3:46

=== 7" vinyl (UK) ===
1. "Things That Are"
2. "Amazing Things" (Remix)

== Chart performance ==
=== Album ===
Chart performance for Amazing Things
Chart (1993)	Peak position
German Albums (Offizielle Top 100)	81
UK Albums (OCC)	24
Scottish Albums (OCC)	3

==== Certifications ====
- United Kingdom (BPI) – Silver

=== Single ===
Chart (1995)	Peak position
Scotland (OCC)	9
UK Singles (OCC)	40

== Personnel ==
Runrig

- Iain Bayne - drums, percussion
- Malcolm Jones - guitars, hurdy-gurdy, accordion
- Calum Macdonald - percussion
- Rory Macdonald - vocals, bass guitar
- Donnie Munro - lead vocals
- Peter Wishart - keyboards
