= Ian Cawsey =

British Labour Party politician

Member of Parliament for Brigg and Goole
- In office 1 May 1997 – 12 April 2010
- Preceded by: Constituency Created
- Succeeded by: Andrew Percy

Personal details
- Born: 14 April 1960 (age 66) Grimsby, Lincolnshire, England
- Party: Labour
- Website: http://www.iancawsey.co.uk/

Ian Arthur Cawsey (born 14 April 1960) is a British Labour Party politician who was the Member of Parliament (MP) for Brigg and Goole from 1997 until his defeat at the 2010 general election.

== Early life and career ==
He went to Welholme Primary School on Heneage Road, then Wintringham School on Weelsby Avenue in Grimsby. He stood for Great Grimsby Borough Council unsuccessfully in Wellow ward in 1983, Gilbey ward in 1984 (losing by just 27 votes) and Wintringham ward in 1987. He was later elected a county councillor for the Ashby division in Scunthorpe on the former Humberside County Council from 1989 until its abolition in 1996.

He stood in the 1992 election for the seat of Brigg & Cleethorpes and came second. From 1996 to 1997, he was leader of North Lincolnshire Council and was the Chair of the Humberside Police Authority Chair from December 1994 to 1997. From 1977 until 1987, he worked in computing for Imperial Foods (now known as Young's Bluecrest) in Grimsby and Seven Seas Health Care (owned by Merck KGaA) on Hedon Road in Hull.

In the 1990s he lived on Glover Road South.

== Family ==
He married Linda Mary Kirman in July 1987. They have three children, including Jake Cawsey, a professional footballer. They live in Winterton..

== Parliamentary career ==
He was first elected at the 1997 election, and was seen as a strong supporter of Tony Blair and New Labour. He served on the Home Affairs Select Committee, the Universities, Innovation, Science & Skills Select Committee and the Science & Technology Select Committee.

He chaired the Associate Parliamentary group for Animal Welfare and was twice voted by MPs and Peers of all parties as the Dods Charity Champion for Animal Welfare.

He served as Parliamentary Private Secretary (PPS) to Lord Williams of Mostyn from 2001 to 2002. He then became PPS to David Miliband at the Department for Education and Skills and then the Cabinet Office. After the 2005 general election he was made a Government whip.

On taking office Gordon Brown appointed Cawsey to be a Vice-Chair of the Labour Party with responsibility for animal welfare.

== Personal life ==
He is a musician and has performed in local bands such as Mandrake, Sneaky Feet, Brix & Chinese Whispers and he sings and plays bass guitar in the rock group MP4, which is composed of four MPs, Cawsey, Peter Wishart MP, Greg Knight and Kevin Brennan.

He played from 1990 to 1997 in a well known local 60s covers band, The Moggies, the band reformed in 2011 and have established a popular local following once more.

He was treated successfully for cancer. He had collapsed at home in March 1998, being taken to Scunthorpe General Hospital, with Hodgkin lymphoma. A six month cancer treatment began on Wednesday 22 April 1998, whereby he lost his hair. After a liver biopsy in September 1998, he suffered internal bleeding.

Since leaving parliament he has worked for the World Society for the Protection of Animals, firstly on their successful UK campaign to stop a large mega-dairy being built in Nocton, Lincolnshire, he was briefly their Chief of Staff running the Office of the Chief Executive before being promoted to be their Director of Policy & External Affairs in 2012.

He is a Winterton Town Councillor and an after dinner speaker. He is the Secretary of the Jerry Green Dog Rescue Trust and a member of the Winterton & District Lions (President 2011–2013).
