= Unspun with Matt Forde =

- Also known as: Unspun XL with Matt Forde (extended version)
- Presented by: Matt Forde
- Composer: Dobs Vye
- Country of origin: United Kingdom
- No. of series: 4
- No. of episodes: 27

Production
- Executive producers: Jon Thoday; Richard Allen Turner
- Producers: Robyn O'Brien (Series 1); Mark Iddon (Series 2–4)
- Production location: ITV Studios
- Running time: 60 minutes (inc. adverts) (Series 1–2, XL); 30 minutes (inc. adverts) (Series 3–4)
- Production company: Avalon

Original release
- Network: Dave
- Release: 14 September 2016 – 18 March 2018

Unspun with Matt Forde is a British political satire television series hosted by comedian Matt Forde. The first series was broadcast from 14 September to 19 October 2016 on Dave.

The show features a house band, MP4, a rock band composed of British politicians.

Unspun began its second series on 1 March 2017, which concluded on 5 April 2017. The third series started on 17 May 2017, and ended on 7 June 2017. The fourth series started on 28 January 2018, and ended on 18 March 2018.

== Episodes ==
=== Series overview ===
Season	Episodes	Originally released	
Season	Episodes	First released	Last released
1	6	September 14, 2016	October 19, 2016
2	6	March 1, 2017	April 5, 2017
3	7	May 17, 2017	June 7, 2017
4	8	January 28, 2018	March 18, 2018

=== Series 1 (2016) ===
No. overall	No. in series	Guest	Directed by	Original release date
1	1	Alan Johnson	Peter Orton	September 14, 2016
2	2	Anna Soubry	Peter Orton	September 21, 2016
3	3	Nick Clegg	Peter Orton	September 28, 2016
4	4	Chuka Umunna	Peter Orton	October 5, 2016
5	5	Ruth Davidson	Peter Orton	October 12, 2016
6	6	Angus Robertson	Peter Orton	October 19, 2016

=== Series 2 (2017) ===
No. overall	No. in series	Guest	Directed by	Original release date
7	1	Tim Farron	Peter Orton	1 March 2017
8	2	Michael Fabricant	Peter Orton	8 March 2017
9	3	Harriet Harman	Peter Orton	15 March 2017
10	4	Jess Phillips	Peter Orton	23 March 2017 (Note: Originally scheduled to air on 22 March 2017 but delayed due to the Westminster attack earlier in the day.)
11	5	Nicky Morgan	Peter Orton	29 March 2017
12	6	Tony Blair	Peter Orton	5 April 2017

=== Series 3 (2017) ===
No. overall	No. in series	Guest	Directed by	Original release date
13	1	John Woodcock	Peter Orton	17 May 2017
14	2	Sayeeda Warsi	Peter Orton	21 May 2017
15	3	Jacqui Smith	Peter Orton	24 May 2017
16	4	Suzanne Evans	Peter Orton	28 May 2017
17	5	Chris Huhne	Peter Orton	31 May 2017
18	6	Douglas Carswell	Peter Orton	4 June 2017
19	7	Ann Widdecombe	Peter Orton	7 June 2017

=== Series 4 (2018) ===
No. overall	No. in series	Guest	Directed by	Original release date
20	1	Nadine Dorries; XL: Andrew Maxwell	Peter Orton	28 January 2018; 31 January 2018 (XL)
21	2	Lord Andrew Adonis; XL: Angela Barnes	Peter Orton	4 February 2018; 7 February 2018 (XL)
22	3	Vince Cable; XL: Richard Herring	Peter Orton	11 February 2018; 14 February 2018 (XL)
23	4	Alastair Campbell; XL: Jason Byrne	Peter Orton	18 February 2018; 21 February 2018 (XL)
24	5	Yvette Cooper; XL: Daliso Chaponda	Peter Orton	25 February 2018; 28 February 2018 (XL)
25	6	Justine Greening; XL: Rose Matafeo	Peter Orton	4 March 2018; 7 March 2018 (XL)
26	7	Tom Watson; XL: Mae Martin	Peter Orton	11 March 2018; 14 March 2018 (XL)
27	8	Anthony Scaramucci; XL: Iain Stirling	Peter Orton	18 March 2018; 21 March 2018 (XL)
