= Douglas Crawford =

Scottish politician and journalist

Member of Parliament for Perth and East Perthshire
- In office 10 October 1974 – 7 April 1979
- Preceded by: Ian MacArthur
- Succeeded by: Bill Walker

Personal details
- Born: 1 November 1939
- Died: 17 April 2002 (aged 62) Campbeltown, Scotland, United Kingdom
- Party: Scottish National Party (SNP)

George Douglas Crawford (1 November 1939 – 17 April 2002) was a Scottish politician and journalist who served as Member of Parliament (MP) for Perth and East Perthshire from 1974 to 1979.

Crawford was educated at Glasgow Academy and St Catharine's College, Cambridge, before working as a journalist in London. He was an Industrial Correspondent for the Glasgow Herald newspaper from 1963 to 1966, and then worked as Head of Publications for the Scottish Council for Development and Industry.

A convinced believer in the benefits of Scottish independence, he worked unofficially as an adviser and researcher to Winnie Ewing whilst she was the sole Scottish National Party parliamentarian from 1967 till 1970. He also served as SNP Director of Communications in the late 1960s before becoming a Vice-Chairman of the party in the early 1970s.

He was elected as Member of Parliament (MP) for Perth and East Perthshire at the October 1974 election as the party increased its number of representatives from 7 to 11. Elected with a majority of 793, he was given the financial portfolio in the SNP Parliamentary grouping, but lost his seat at the 1979 general election along with 8 of his colleagues. Although he garnered only 287 fewer votes than he had when he was elected, the Conservatives increased their vote by 3,609 to leave Crawford trailing by 3,103 votes.

Not long after his defeat he suffered a cerebral haemorrhage from which he recovered to contest the Perth and Kinross constituency in the 1983 election, but lost to Nicholas Fairbairn, the Conservative incumbent MP, who won with a 6,733 majority.

Crawford died in 2002 in Campbeltown. He married (and later divorced) journalist Joan Burnie, with whom he had two children. His son, Ewan, at one stage worked for former SNP leader John Swinney.

Parliament of the United Kingdom
Preceded by Ian MacArthur	Member of Parliament for Perth & East Perthshire; October 1974 – 1979	Succeeded by Bill Walker
Party political offices
Preceded by Isobel Lindsay	Scottish National Party Vice Chair (Publicity); 1974–1975	Succeeded by Janette Jones
