= 1878 Perth by-election =

UK parliamentary by-election

The 1878 Perth by-election was fought on 29 January 1878. The by-election was fought due to the succession to a peerage of the incumbent Liberal MP, Arthur Kinnaird. It was won by the Liberal candidate Charles Stuart Parker.
