= Thomas Hunter (Scottish politician) =

Sir Thomas Hunter (2 October 1872 – 19 March 1953) was a Scottish Unionist Party politician who served as the Member of Parliament (MP) for Perth. He was one of the leading campaigners against Jews from Germany being allowed to enter the United Kingdom.

Hunter was elected for the Perth seat at the 1935 general election, and held it until he stood down from the House of Commons at the 1945 general election.

Parliament of the United Kingdom
Preceded by Francis Norie-Miller	Member of Parliament for Perth; 1935 – 1945	Succeeded by Alan Gomme-Duncan
