= Andrew Percy =

British Conservative politician

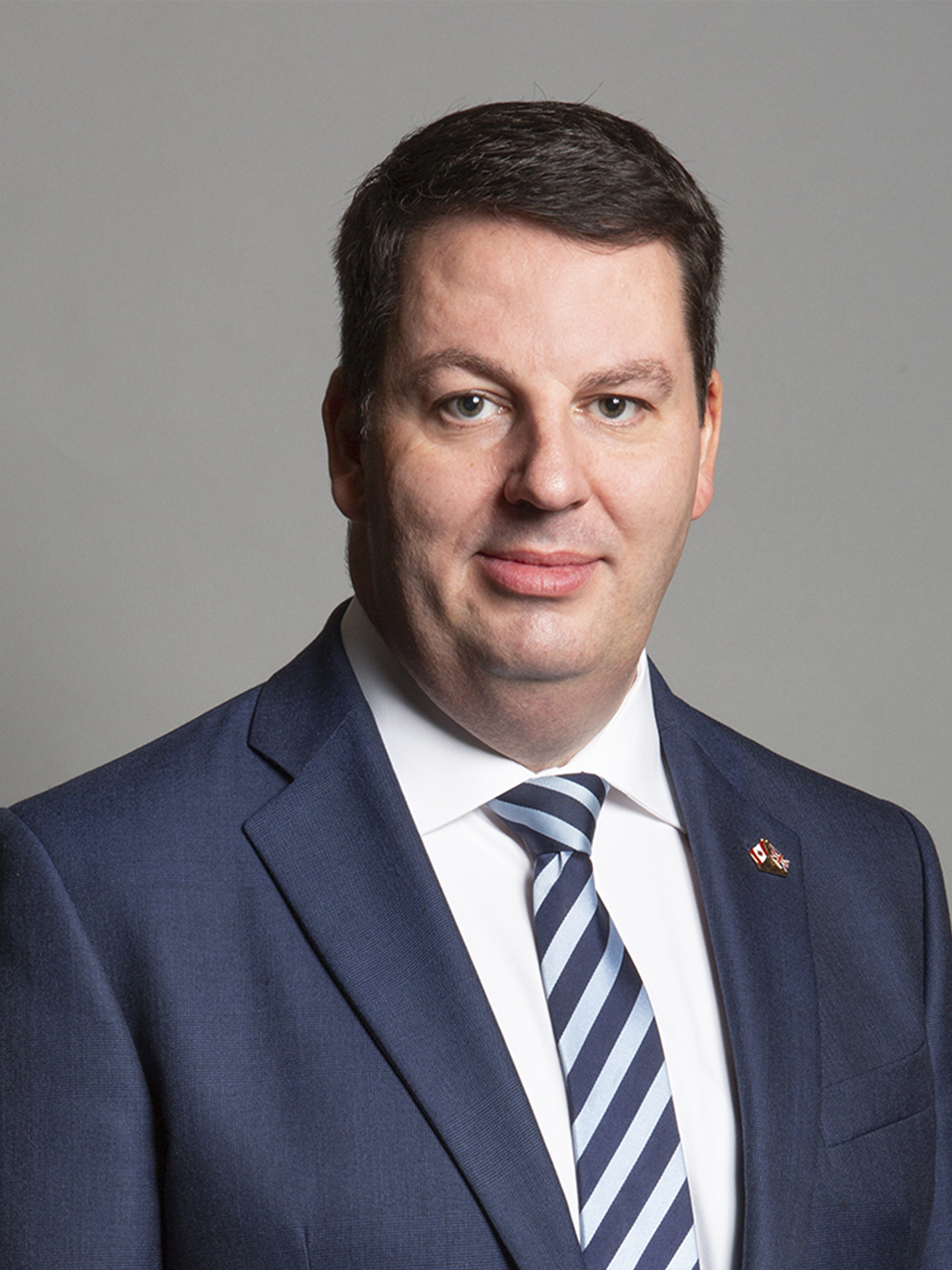
- Official portrait, 2019

Parliamentary Under-Secretary of State for Local Growth and Northern Powerhouse
- In office 17 July 2016 – 14 June 2017
- Prime Minister: Theresa May
- Preceded by: The Baroness Williams of Trafford; James Wharton
- Succeeded by: Jake Berry

Member of Parliament for Brigg and Goole
- In office 6 May 2010 – 30 May 2024
- Preceded by: Ian Cawsey
- Succeeded by: Constituency abolished

Personal details
- Born: 18 September 1977 (age 49) Kingston upon Hull, Humberside, England
- Party: Conservative
- Education: University of York; University of Leeds
- Website: www.andrewpercy.org

Andrew Theakstone Percy (born 18 September 1977) is a British Conservative Party politician who served as the Member of Parliament (MP) for Brigg and Goole from 2010 to 2024. He was an active member of many groups in Parliament, including All-Party Parliamentary Groups on Financial Education for Young People and Yorkshire and Northern Lincolnshire, as well as the anti-European Union Better Off Out Group.

== Early life ==
Percy was born in Hull and brought up in Humberside, the son of a foundry worker (later a market gardener) and a school secretary; he has an older sister. He attended the all-boys (11–16) comprehensive William Gee School (now part of Endeavour High School) and is a politics graduate of the University of York and studied at Leeds University on a law conversion course He then worked as a secondary school history teacher in several schools, including in the United States and Canada. He was subsequently a teacher at an infant school in Scunthorpe.

Before being elected to Parliament at the 2010 general election, he served as a parish councillor for Airmyn, near Goole, and from 2000 to 2010, as a councillor for the Bricknell ward on Hull City Council alongside Cllr. John Fareham. During his time on the City Council Percy served as Chairman of the Licensing Committee, overseeing the transfer of liquor licensing from the Magistrates' Court to the council. He also served as a Director of Kingstown Works Ltd. He contested the Yorkshire seat of Normanton in 2005, but was ultimately unsuccessful in defeating the Labour candidate, Ed Balls.

== Parliamentary career ==
Percy was elected to the House of Commons as Member of Parliament for Brigg and Goole in the 2010 general election by a majority of 5,147. In the 2015 general election he increased his majority to 11,176, receiving 53 per cent of the vote.

Percy is rated as one of the Conservatives' most rebellious MPs, and has voted with Labour on key issues such as loan sharking, Education Maintenance Allowance and student tuition fees.

Percy is the Vice chair of the Conservative Friends of Israel group and has been part of a number of delegations to Israel on behalf of the group, including during the Operation Defensive Shield conflict when he visited for an Israeli military briefing on the Iron Dome defence system. He defended Israel's actions in the conflict, saying "Israel acts as we would", in relation to the provocation faced from Hamas.

In the 2010 Parliament, Percy served on the Health Select Committee, Regulatory Reform Committee and Northern Ireland Committee.

In 2011, Percy called for a referendum on bringing back the death penalty.

=== Second term (2015–2017) ===
Percy was re-elected at the 2015 general election. In the same year, he was also re-elected to the Health and Regulatory Reform committees in the 2015 Parliament. He also served as chairman of the All Party Yorkshire and North Lincs Group and as an officer of a number of other All Party Parliamentary groups, including Financial Education for Young People, The Commonwealth and on Global Education. He is a member of the All Party Parliamentary Group on British Jews.

Percy was elected to the UK Commonwealth Parliamentary Association Executive in 2015 and was also appointed to the Speaker's Panel of Chairs.

At a sitting in the House of Commons in April 2016, he asked Conservative Leader of the House, Chris Grayling if he agreed that the government should bring forward proposals to ensure ex-police officers standing as police and crime commissioner (PCC) candidates should be required to make their public service records available for public scrutiny. Although Percy did not identify any individual PCC candidate, Grayling did in his reply. He said: "My Honourable Friend makes an important point. I am aware of allegations about the Labour PCC candidate in Humberside. If the stories alleged about that candidate are true, he is unfit for public office, and it is a matter of public interest that the truth should be known before election day." Percy and Grayling subsequently refused to elaborate on the content of any such allegations. Percy quit Twitter several days later, citing "bullies", "trolls", "nastiness" and "aggression" as reasons for doing so.

After Theresa May became Prime Minister in 2016, Percy was appointed to be the Parliamentary Undersecretary of State and Minister for Local Growth and the Northern Powerhouse.

=== Third term ===
Following the general election held on 8 June 2017, Percy was, again, re-elected as the Member of Parliament for Brigg and Goole with an increased majority of 12,363, an increase from 2015 of 7.4%. Percy announced that he would not return as Parliamentary Undersecretary of State and Minister for Local Growth and the Northern Powerhouse, stating that he wished to return to the backbenches.

It was announced in September 2017 that Percy would be the Prime Minister's Trade Envoy to Canada, a newly created role.

On 22 July 2019, Percy resigned from the Trade Envoy role in protest over Liam Fox's planned no-deal Brexit policy that he believed would threaten the UK's annual £800 million business with Canada, criticising what he called the "cack-handed" proposal to scrap or slash tariffs on almost all imports – blaming it for Ottawa's refusal to give the UK its existing deal with the EU.

=== Fourth term ===
On 13 May 2020, Percy was absent from a vote on Agriculture Bill — New Clause 2 — International trade Agreements: Agricultural and Food Products — Compliance with UK and Word Trade Organisation Standards. When challenged by a member of his constituency he reportedly said: "There was no particular reason for not voting on that amendment". When pressed for an explanation from his farming constituent, Percy declined to expand. Percy participated in three other votes on the same day.

On 15 September 2020 he was one of two Conservative MPs (together with Roger Gale) who voted against the UK Internal Market Bill at second reading.

Percy stood down at the 2024 general election.

== Personal life ==
Percy converted to Judaism in March 2017, having been baptised into the Church of England. He has identified with the Jewish community since primary school.

Parliament of the United Kingdom
Preceded by Ian Cawsey	Member of Parliament for Brigg and Goole; 2010–2024	Constituency abolished
