= Francis Norie-Miller =

British insurance company manager director

Norie-Miller in 1939

Sir Francis Norie-Miller, 1st Baronet (11 March 1859 – 4 July 1947) was a British insurance company manager director. He was also a Liberal and later Liberal National politician. Although he was born in England, his chief associations were with Scotland and in particular the city of Perth. In 1936, he was created a Baronet with the title of Norie-Miller of Cleeve in the New Year's Honours List for political and public service in the County of Perth and for his local philanthropy.

== Family and education ==
Norie-Miller was born at Cheshunt in Hertfordshire, the son of Henry Miller, the Chief Statistical Officer for HM Customs and his wife Anne Norrie. Norie-Miller was educated privately and then trained for the law but he never practised and began a career in insurance instead. In 1884 he married Grace Harvey Day, the daughter of the vicar of Cheshunt. They had two sons, Claud, who was killed on active service in 1917 and Stanley who went on to succeed his father in the baronetcy and in business. They also had a daughter, Elwena. Norie-Miller's first wife died in 1931 and three years later he married his secretary Florence Jean Belfrage McKim, of Scone in Perthshire.

== Career ==
Norie-Miller began his insurance career in London, then moved to Glasgow and for practically the next sixty years he was a chief officer of a number of insurance companies. He was particularly associated with the General Accident, Fire and Life Assurance Association, which he joined soon after it was incorporated in 1885. He played a crucial role in developing its business base in the United Kingdom and later was central in the company's expansion overseas, most notably in the USA. Under his dynamic direction the company built up a worldwide business. He went on to be its chairman and managing director. The portrait of Norie-Miller which hung in the company board room in Perth bore the legend "Founder of the Company". One historian of the insurance industry has described Norie-Miller as one of ‘the great insurance autocrats of the late nineteenth and early twentieth centuries’. Although Norie Miller based his business in Scotland it would appear that he didn't recognise Scotland as a nation. Advertising posters for his company would read Perth, N.B. i.e. North Britain.

== Public service ==
Norie-Miller was intimately involved with the civic life of Perth for many years. He was a Justice of the Peace for the county of Perthshire for nearly 50 years. For over 21 years he was Chairman of the School Board of Perth or of Perth County Education Authority and he was for 32 years Director (15 years chairman) Perth Royal Infirmary. In 1907 he was made an honorary fellow of the Educational Institute of Scotland and in 1933 he became a freeman of the city of Perth.

== Politics ==
Norie-Miller contested Perth as a Liberal at the 1931 general election. The Liberal Party, led by Sir Herbert Samuel had agreed to support the National Government of Ramsay MacDonald at the 1931 general election, with some reservations over the traditional Liberal policy of free trade and Norie-Miller fought the election publicly supporting the government . However the Conservatives also supported the National Government and neither party therefore had a clear advantage with the electorate in terms of identification with the National Government.

General election 1931: Perth
Party	Candidate	Votes	%	±%
Conservative	Lord Scone	19,254	50.2	
Liberal	Francis Norie-Miller	15,396	40.1	
Labour	Helen Gault	3,705	9.7	
Majority		3,858		

Norie-Miller then stood down as prospective Liberal candidate for Perth and in 1934 the local Liberal Association selected James Scott, the former Liberal MP for Kincardine and Aberdeenshire West as their new representative. In 1935, when Lord Scone succeeded his father as Earl of Mansfield and Mansfield and went to the House of Lords, a by-election was called for Perth. However, instead of adopting James Scott as their Parliamentary candidate, the Perth Liberals invited Norie-Miller to fight the election as they learned that Perth Conservatives were willing not to oppose him at the by-election providing he stood as a National candidate. Scott was known as a strong supporter of Free Trade whereas Norie-Miller favoured tariffs and protectionism. In a straight fight with the Labour candidate the former MP Adam McKinley, Norie-Miller won the by-election on 16 April 1935 by a majority of 9,532.

By-election of 16 April 1935: Perth
Party	Candidate	Votes	%	±%
National Liberal	Francis Norie-Miller	17,516	68.7	
Labour	A McKinley	7,984	31.3	
Majority		9,532		

Whether Norie-Miller simply did not take to political life, or found it clashed too greatly with his business responsibilities or if he just felt he was too old at 76 to give Parliament its proper attention, he decided not to contest the 1935 general election in November that year. There had clearly been some confusion about his candidacy and its joint support by local Liberal and Conservative Associations. Shortly before the election, a Captain Harry Houldsworth, looked set to contest the seat as a National Conservative but suddenly withdrew claiming he had misunderstood the local position and in the belief that Norie-Miller wished to continue. There was division in the Conservative ranks about whether to renew support for Norie-Miller. On 26 October, Norie-Miller did withdraw from the electoral race, citing medical reasons and the confusion of the position but the Unionists did not re-select Captain Houldsworth as their man, turning instead to Thomas Hunter, who was described in The Times newspaper as the Lord Provost of Perth and who could also rely on Liberal support. So no Liberal candidate of any stripe contested the 1935 general election in Perth which was won by the Unionists in a straight fight with Labour.

== Death ==
Norie-Miller remained active in the insurance business until the time of his death, as chairman of General Accident until 1944 and as its honorary governor from 1938 until his death in 1947. He died at his home at Cleeve, Cherrybank, near Perth, on 4 July 1947, aged 88 years, and was buried at St Ninian's Cathedral, Perth where he had been a worshipper.

== See also ==
- List of United Kingdom MPs with the shortest service

Parliament of the United Kingdom
Preceded by Mungo Murray	Member of Parliament for Perth; April 1935 – November 1935	Succeeded by Thomas Hunter
Baronetage of the United Kingdom
New creation	Baronet (of Cleeve); 1936–1947	Succeeded by Stanley Norie-Miller
