= Ian MacArthur =

British politician

Ian MacArthur (17 May 1925 – 30 November 2007) was a British Conservative Party politician who served as Member of Parliament for Perth and East Perthshire from 1959 until 1974.

== Early life ==
MacArthur was born on 17 May 1925. He was the younger son of Lieutenant-General Sir William MacArthur. He was educated at Cheltenham College and Queen's College, Oxford. He worked as an associate director of a marketing and advertising company.

== Political career ==
MacArthur contested Greenock twice as a Unionist in 1955, in the general election and a by-election. He was Member of Parliament for Perth and East Perthshire from 1959 until his defeat at the October 1974 general election, when he lost by 793 votes to Douglas Crawford of the Scottish National Party.

In the House of Commons he was a whip 1963–65, as a Lord Commissioner of the Treasury 1963–64. He then became an opposition Scottish affairs spokesman.

== Personal life ==
He married Judith Miller in 1957 and had 7 children, including Niall MacArthur, founder of Eat.

Parliament of the United Kingdom
Preceded by Sir Alan Gomme-Duncan	Member of Parliament for Perth & East Perthshire; 1959 – October 1974	Succeeded by Douglas Crawford
