= Alan Gomme-Duncan =

Colonel Sir Alan Gomme Gomme-Duncan MC FSA Scot
- Born: Alan Gomme Duncan; 5 July 1893
- Died: 13 December 1963 (aged 70)
- Military career
- Allegiance: United Kingdom
- Branch: British Army
- Rank: Colonel
- Unit: Black Watch
- Conflicts: First World War; Second World War
- Awards: Military Cross
- Other work: Member of Parliament

Colonel Sir Alan Gomme Gomme-Duncan MC FSA Scot (5 July 1893 – 13 December 1963), born Alan Gomme Duncan, was a British Army officer who served in both World Wars; he was recalled to the army at the age of 45 in advance of World War II. In a brief break in his career he was Inspector of Prisons for Scotland. After the liberation of Europe he went into politics and served for fourteen years as a Unionist Party Member of Parliament (MP) in Scotland, becoming known for humorous remarks combined with a lively partisanship.

== Early life and First World War ==
Alan Gomme Duncan was the only son of Alfred Edward Duncan, and was sent to Merchant Taylors' School. At the outbreak of the First World War, Duncan joined the London Scottish, serving in France and Belgium. At the beginning of January 1917, while holding the rank of lieutenant (and temporary Captain), he was awarded the Military Cross. He was later transferred to the Black Watch for whom he served in Germany after the armistice and into 1919. During the war, Duncan was twice Mentioned in Despatches, and was also wounded in action. He ended the war with the substantive rank of captain.

== Inter-war army career ==
After the end of the war, Duncan formed a business partnership with his father, who was a produce broker in the City of London. He married Mary Bourne on 2 April 1919 at Leavesden, Hertfordshire. However, Duncan, still an officer in the Black Watch, was posted to India later in 1919; he decided to remain in the army and not to pursue his business, and so the partnership with his father was dissolved on 1 July 1921.

In India, Duncan was a staff officer with the Western Command in Quetta from 1923 to 1927. He returned to Britain in 1927, and was a staff officer on the Northern Command based in York from 1929 to 1933. He returned to India in 1933 for four more years with the Black Watch, before retiring from the army, with the rank of major, in 1937. He moved to Bridge of Earn in Perthshire, and in 1938 he assumed by Authority the surname of Gomme-Duncan instead of Duncan.

== Recall to the colours ==
On 1 November 1938 it was announced that Gomme-Duncan had been appointed HM Inspector of Prisons for Scotland. This was to be a brief appointment, for Gomme-Duncan was "recalled to the Colours" as a reservist in June 1939. He was appointed Deputy Assistant Adjutant-General at the War Office.

1940 saw Gomme-Duncan placed in command of the 70th Battalion of the Black Watch. In 1941 he was attached to the Royal Air Force, and in 1942 he became assistant adjutant-general at the War Office. Preparing for the invasion of France, Gomme-Duncan commanded 101 Reinforcement Group within 21 Army Group from 1943 to 1944; he went across to France with the Second Army, where he held a command in Normandy and also served in Belgium and the Netherlands. He finally left the army, as a colonel, in 1945.

== Political career ==
For the 1945 general election, Gomme-Duncan was chosen as the Unionist Party candidate for Perth, which included his home at Bridge of Earn, and where the sitting member was retiring. Gomme-Duncan easily won election to the House of Commons, obtaining a majority of 10,867.

In November 1945 Gomme-Duncan seconded a motion calling on the Government to withdraw a proposal to build a hydro-electric scheme on a particularly picturesque highland lake; he asserted that Parliament should not be led by the Electricity Commissioners in deciding which schemes to progress, and urged the government to consult the people of Scotland. He opposed the Civil Aviation Bill, arguing that it abrogated the Treaty of Union which guaranteed Scotland freedom of navigation in England.

== Indian independence ==
Gomme-Duncan spoke from experience in late 1946 when he opposed independence for India, contending that the Congress Party consisted of "moneylenders and landlords" who did not recognise their responsibilities to the peasants, while the British were the only people for 200 years who protected the "toiling masses". He also defended the landlord and tenant system in Scotland. He succeeded in May 1948 in getting a pledge from Secretary of State for War Emanuel Shinwell that the Highland regiments would once again be supplied with kilts.

He was a critic of the Government's policy in Palestine when the British mandate was surrendered, arguing that the withdrawal of British troops had been mishandled and that the Government's orders had favoured Jews over Arabs. On 30 November Gomme-Duncan presented a petition signed by 530,000 housewives who called on the Government to provide a fuller ration of fresh and varied meat, and a larger share of unrationed meat. In addition to serious points, however, Gomme-Duncan became known for making humorous remarks in Parliament, frequently provoking laughter.

== Scotland within the United Kingdom ==
At the 1950 general election, Gomme-Duncan's constituency was subjected to boundary changes and renamed Perth and East Perthshire. Gomme-Duncan increased his majority to 13,144, although the constituency saw the Scottish National Party obtain its highest vote of that election.

Gomme-Duncan was gratified by the overall electoral failure of the SNP but urged that the signing of the Covenant by a million people be recognised as a sign of dissatisfaction and a commission established to look at the facts and figures. When the Stone of Scone was recovered after its kidnap by Scottish nationalists, he called for a tactful response including leaving the stone in Scotland; when it was eventually returned to Westminster Abbey, he voiced his opposition.

== Political partisanship ==
In September 1950 Gomme-Duncan was made a delegate to the conference of the Commonwealth Parliamentary Association in New Zealand. After the Conservatives returned to power in the 1951 general election, he asserted that there was a serious lessening in the high reputation of the House of Commons due to the "factious opposition". He good-humouredly suggested sending Hewlett Johnson, the "Red" Dean of Canterbury, to a psychiatrist when the Dean circulated Communist propaganda.

Gomme-Duncan ran into controversy in late 1952, when he claimed that the chairman of British European Airways, Lord Douglas of Kirtleside, had made a political speech to BEA workers claiming that a Labour government would increase their wages. Lord Douglas denied making any such speech and the Minister of Civil Aviation Alan Lennox-Boyd accepted his denial and issued a statement of confidence. Gomme-Duncan was obliged to withdraw his remarks. However his popularity did not suffer and soon after he was elected a vice-chairman of the 1922 Committee.

He returned to the issue of hydroelectricity in early 1953, moving to cancel a project in Breadalbane, Perthshire. He was re-elected in the 1955 general election with a majority of 13,721 over the Scottish National Party candidate, the party's former MP Dr Robert McIntyre. In the new Parliament he opposed proposals to increase the school leaving age to 16, saying it would, without qualification, be a disaster.

== Political and lodge honours ==
In the 1956 New Year Honours list, Gomme-Duncan was created a Knight Bachelor "for political and public services". He was "staunchly" loyal to the Government over the Suez Crisis, complaining at the outset that some broadcasts by the BBC to Egypt contained "complete nonsense" in presenting the British case.

After the invasion, he supported a motion critical of United States policy towards Suez for endangering the Atlantic alliance. He was appointed a Senior Grand Deacon in the United Grand Lodge of Freemasons in April 1956.

== Retirement ==
At the beginning of 1957, just after Sir Anthony Eden resigned as prime minister, Gomme-Duncan announced that he would retire at the end of the Parliament. Given the high political tension, the chairman of the Perth and East Perthshire Unionist Association stressed that there was no connection between the two events, and when Gomme-Duncan next spoke it was to attack the Labour MP Edith Summerskill for remarks which Gomme-Duncan asserted had disparaged British troops. He got into a shouting match with the Labour spokesman George Brown who defended Summerskill and disputed that she had made any such remarks. Gomme-Duncan duly retired at the 1959 general election.

In Scotland, Gomme-Duncan held several positions of honour, including membership of the Royal Company of Archers (the Sovereign's Bodyguard in Scotland); he was a Fellow of the Society of Antiquaries of Scotland. Gomme-Duncan was president of the Perthshire Musical Festival Association and vice-president of Perthshire Agricultural Society and of the Boy Scouts in Perth District.

Parliament of the United Kingdom
Preceded by Sir Thomas Hunter	Member of Parliament for Perth; 1945 – 1950	Constituency abolished
New constituency	Member of Parliament for Perth & East Perthshire; 1950 – 1959	Succeeded by Ian MacArthur
