= 1935 Perth by-election =

1935 UK parliamentary by-election

The 1935 Perth by-election was held on 16 April 1935. The by-election was held due to the succession to the peerage of the incumbent Unionist MP, Mungo Murray, Lord Scone. It was won by the Liberal National candidate Francis Norie-Miller.

Norie-Miller contested Perth as a Liberal at the 1931 general election. The Liberal Party, led by Sir Herbert Samuel had agreed to support the National Government of Ramsay MacDonald at the 1931 general election, with some reservations over the traditional Liberal policy of free trade and Norie-Miller fought the election publicly supporting the government . However the Conservatives also supported the National Government and neither party therefore had a clear advantage with the electorate in terms of identification with the National Government.

== Previous election ==
General election 1931: Perth
Party	Candidate	Votes	%	±%
Conservative	Mungo Murray	19,254	50.2	+9.8
Liberal	Francis Norie-Miller	15,396	40.1	+4.0
Labour	Helen Gault	3,705	9.7	−14.2
Majority		3,858	10.1	+5.8
Turnout		38,355	81.4	+4.7
Conservative hold		Swing		

Norie-Miller then stood down as prospective Liberal candidate for Perth and in 1934 the local Liberal Association selected James Scott, the former Liberal MP for Kincardine and Aberdeenshire West as their new representative. In 1935, when Lord Scone succeeded his father as Earl of Mansfield and Mansfield and went to the House of Lords, a by-election was called for Perth. However, instead of adopting James Scott as their Parliamentary candidate, the Perth Liberals invited Norie-Miller to fight the election as they learned that Perth Conservatives were willing not to oppose him at the by-election providing he stood as a National candidate. Scott was known as a strong supporter of Free Trade whereas Norie-Miller favoured tariffs and protectionism. In a straight fight with the Labour candidate the former MP Adam McKinlay, Norie-Miller won the by-election on 16 April 1935 by a majority of 9,532.

== Result ==
1935 Perth by-election
Party	Candidate	Votes	%	±%
Liberal National	Francis Norie-Miller	17,516	68.7	N/A
Labour	Adam McKinlay	7,984	31.3	+21.6
Majority		9,532	37.4	N/A
Turnout		25,500		
Liberal National gain from Unionist		Swing		

Norie-Miller decided not to contest the 1935 general election in November that year.
