= Norie-Miller Walk =

Park in Perth, Scotland

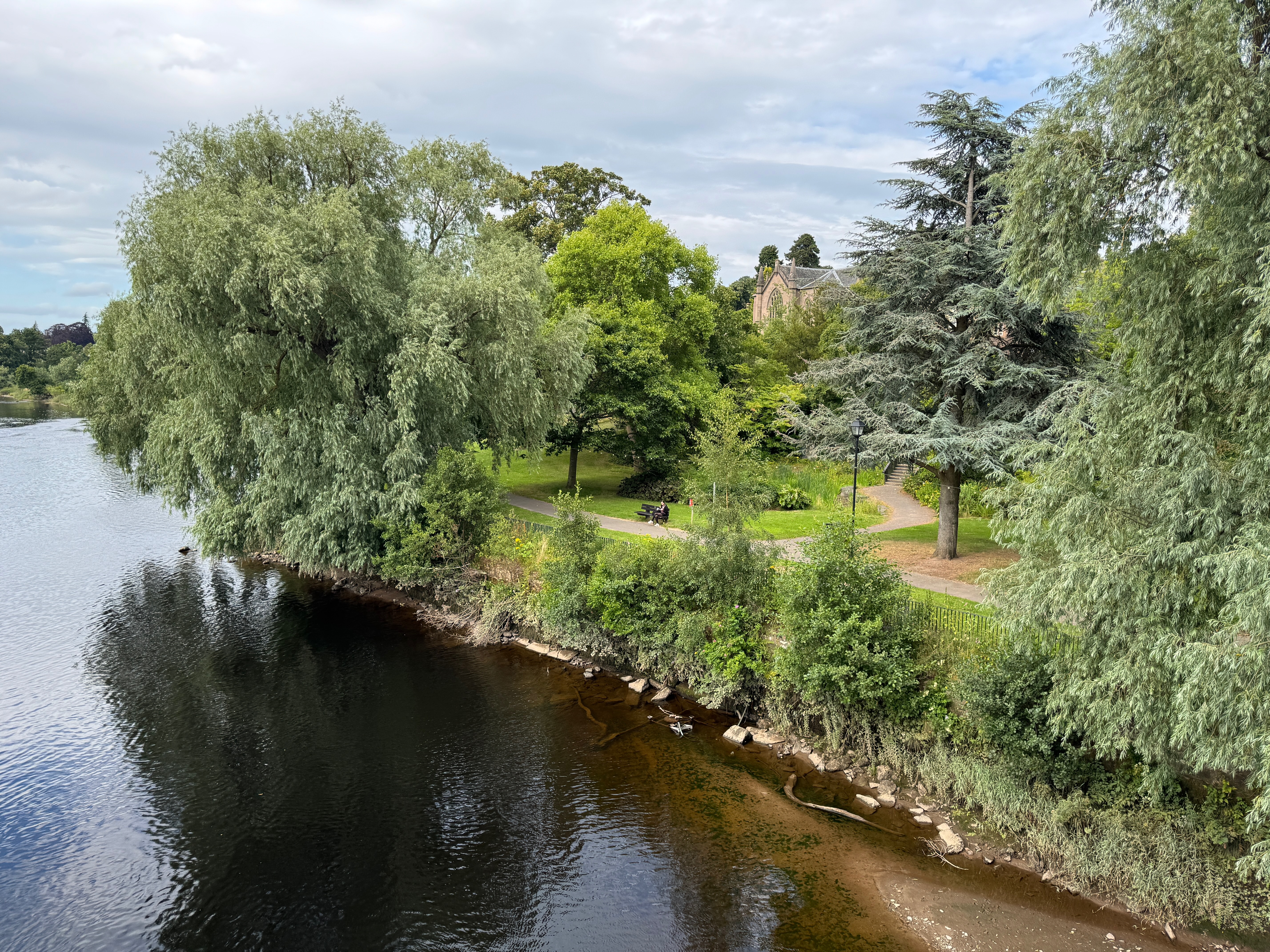
- The park viewed from Queen's Bridge in 2024

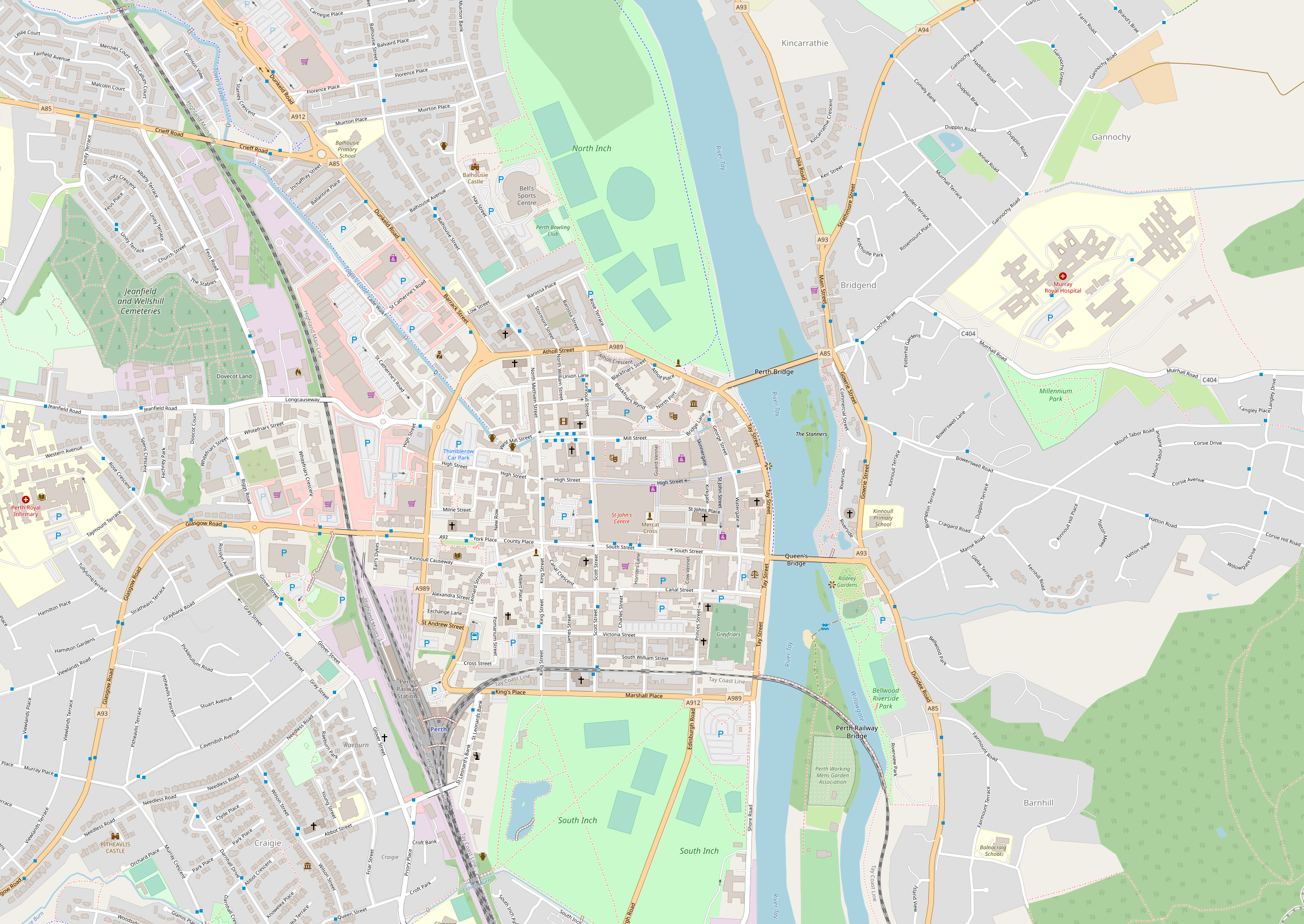
- Location within Perth
- Type: Urban park
- Location: Perth, Scotland
- Coordinates: 56.395615°N 3.4231382°W
- Owner: Perth and Kinross Council
- Operator: Perth and Kinross Council

Norie-Miller Walk is an urban park in the Scottish city of Perth, on the eastern banks of the River Tay. Named for Sir Stanley Norie-Miller, Bt, MC, DL, JP (1888–1973) it is situated between Smeaton's Bridge to the north and Queen's Bridge immediately to the south, and behind Kinnoull Parish Church.

In 2017, the park was lit up, in an event known as Light Nights, for a celebration in honour of Robert Burns.
