= Bill Walker (Scottish Conservative politician) =

Scottish Conservative politician (1929–2017)

Bill Walker OBE

Member of Parliament for Tayside North Perth and East Perthshire (1979–1983)
- In office 3 May 1979 – 8 April 1997
- Preceded by: Douglas Crawford
- Succeeded by: John Swinney

Personal details
- Born: 20 February 1929
- Died: 6 June 2017 (aged 88)
- Party: Conservative
- Spouse: Mavis Lambert (m. 1956)
- Relations: 6 grandchildren
- Children: 3 daughters

William Connoll Walker OBE (20 February 1929 – 6 June 2017), known as Bill Walker, was a British Conservative Party politician who served as Deputy Chairman of the Scottish Conservative Party from 2000 until 2008. He was Member of Parliament (MP) for Perth and East Perthshire later Tayside North from 1979 to 1997. He never held any office in government and was one of the Maastricht Rebels against the embattled administration of John Major during the mid-1990s.

== Air Cadets ==
Walker began his cadet career in 1942 with 1707 (Dundee) Squadron of the Air Training Corps (ATC). Joining the organisation just a year after its inception, he continued his affinity with the air cadets ever since. He went on to spend a total of nine years in full-time regular RAF service, doing National Service including tours in the Middle East and later started the new Central Gliding School as a flight lieutenant. He has since held several different roles, many of which featured within the Air Cadet gliding fraternity, the largest gliding organisation in the world, culminating in his appointment in the 1990s as President of Air Cadet Gliding and in 2011 becoming the first officer of the RAFVR(T) to be appointed to the rank of group captain.

== Parliamentary career ==
Walker stood at Dundee East in the October 1974 general election, coming third.

He was first elected in the 1979 general election as the Member of Parliament for Perth and East Perthshire. In 1983, he became MP for the newly formed Tayside North.

Walker enjoyed wearing the kilt, and he was one of two MPs who deliberately wore it in Parliament one day in July 1982 to mark the 200th anniversary of the lifting of the ban on wearing tartan, imposed after the 1745 Jacobite rising. He was a staunch Eurosceptic who resigned as vice chair of the Scottish Conservatives in 1992 to vote against the Government's attempts to implement the Maastricht Treaty. He became one of the Maastricht Rebels who repeatedly voted against the Government's attempts to ratify the treaty. In July 1993, despite being seriously ill, he flew down to London for a key vote on Maastricht and was kept hidden from the Government whips until the vote took place; his vote helped to inflict a defeat upon the Government.

In 1994, Walker was implicated in the Cash for Questions scandal that involved other Conservative MPs such as Neil Hamilton and Tim Smith. However, in Walker's case the matter was not taken further when it emerged that he had given the cash to charity.

During his years in Parliament, Walker managed to get five Private Member's Bills passed, including the bill which became the Scotch Whisky Act 1988, which gave a boost to the Scottish whisky industry.

Walker lost Tayside North when he was defeated by the SNP's John Swinney in 1997. He was elected Deputy Chairman of the Scottish Conservatives in June 2000. He was reelected in 2006, serving until 2008.

He died on 6 June 2017 at the age of 88. He was survived by his widow Mavis (née Lambert), who he married in 1956, as well as their three daughters (Clova, Fiona and Justine) and six grandchildren.

== Publications ==
- Scotland and Unionism - The Way Forward, by Bill Walker, M.P., & Dr. Mark Mayall, [Conservative Parliamentary Candidate for Livingston (UK Parliament constituency) in 1987], Conservative Monday Club Policy Paper, May 1988.
- Scotland - Reversing the Tory Decline, by Dr. Mark Mayall (Monday Club Chairman), Foreword by Bill Walker, M.P. Monday Club Policy Paper, February 1991.

Parliament of the United Kingdom
Preceded by Douglas Crawford	Member of Parliament for Perth & East Perthshire; 1979 – 1983	Constituency abolished
New constituency	Member of Parliament for North Tayside; 1983 – 1997	Succeeded by John Swinney
