= Perth and East Perthshire =

Parliamentary constituency in the United Kingdom, 1950–1983

- Former county constituency for the House of Commons
- Major settlements: Perth

1950–1983
- Seats: One
- Created from: Perth
- Replaced by: Perth & Kinross and Tayside North

Perth and East Perthshire was a county constituency of the House of Commons of the Parliament of the United Kingdom from 1950 to 1983. It elected one Member of Parliament (MP) by the first past the post system of election.

== Boundaries ==
The constituency was defined by the House of Commons (Redistribution of Seats) Act 1949 and first used in the 1950 general election. The boundaries were exactly those of the preceding Perth constituency, and it was one of two constituencies covering the county of Perth and the county of Kinross. The other was Kinross and West Perthshire.

The Perth and East Perthshire constituency was defined as covering the burghs of Abernethy, Alyth, Blairgowrie, Coupar Angus, Perth, and Rattray in the county of Perth and the Blairgowrie, and Perth districts of the county.

1950 boundaries were used also for the general elections of 1951, 1955, 1959, 1964, 1966 and 1970.

For the February 1974 general election, the results of the Second Periodical Review of the Boundary Commission were implemented, and there was a minor change to the boundaries of Perth and East Perthshire. It was redefined as covering the burghs of Abernethy, Alyth, Blairgowrie and Rattray (now a single burgh), Coupar Angus, and Perth in the county of Perth, and the Eastern, and Perth districts of the county.

February 1974 boundaries were used also in the general elections of October 1974 and 1979.

In 1975, under the Local Government (Scotland) Act 1973, counties and burghs throughout Scotland had been abolished in favour of regions and districts and islands council areas. The county of Kinross and most of the county of Perth had been merged into the Tayside region. The burghs of Callander, Doune, and Dunblane in the county of Perth, the Perth parish of Muckhart and the Western district of the county (except the electoral division of Ardoch) had been merged into the Central region.

New constituency boundaries, taking account of new local government boundaries, were adopted for the 1983 general election. Constituencies defined to cover the Tayside region included Perth and Kinross.

== Members of Parliament ==
Election	Member	Party	Notes
1950	Sir Alan Gomme-Duncan	Unionist	previously MP for Perth
1959	Ian MacArthur	Unionist	
Oct 1974	Douglas Crawford	SNP	
1979	Bill Walker	Conservative	
1983	constituency abolished: see Perth and Kinross		

== Election results ==
=== Elections in the 1950s ===
General election 1950: Perth and East Perthshire
Party	Candidate	Votes	%	±%
Unionist	Alan Gomme-Duncan	24,850	56.1	
Labour	William Hughes	11,706	26.4	
SNP	Donald Stewart	4,118	9.3	
Liberal	John Lamont Wilson	3,623	8.2	
Majority		13,144	29.7	
Turnout		44,297	81.6	
Unionist win (new seat)				

General election 1951: Perth and East Perthshire
Party	Candidate	Votes	%	±%
Unionist	Alan Gomme-Duncan	25,798	50.4	−5.7
Labour	Neil McBride	11,167	25.7	−0.7
SNP	Robert McIntyre	6,479	14.9	+5.6
Majority		14,631	33.7	+4.0
Turnout		43,444		
Unionist hold		Swing		

General election 1955: Perth and East Perthshire
Party	Candidate	Votes	%	±%
Unionist	Alan Gomme-Duncan	22,948	56.7	+6.3
SNP	Robert McIntyre	9,227	22.8	+7.9
Labour	John B Urquhart	8,313	20.5	−5.2
Majority		13,721	33.9	+0.2
Turnout		40,488		
Unionist hold		Swing		

General election 1959: Perth and East Perthshire
Party	Candidate	Votes	%	±%
Unionist	Ian MacArthur	24,217	58.2	+1.5
SNP	Robert McIntyre	9,637	23.1	+0.3
Labour	Thomas W Moore	7,781	18.7	−1.8
Majority		14,580	35.1	+1.2
Turnout		41,635	75.6	
Unionist hold		Swing		

=== Elections in the 1960s ===
General election 1964: Perth and East Perthshire
Party	Candidate	Votes	%	±%
Unionist	Ian MacArthur	23,912	57.9	−0.3
Labour	Frederick L Forrester	10,184	24.7	+6.0
SNP	Robert McIntyre	7,186	17.4	−5.7
Majority		13,728	33.2	−1.8
Turnout		41,282	75.6	0.0
Unionist hold		Swing		

General election 1966: Perth and East Perthshire
Party	Candidate	Votes	%	±%
Conservative	Ian MacArthur	22,129	56.5	−1.4
Labour	James Jennings	10,911	27.9	+3.2
SNP	Malcolm B Shaw	6,128	15.6	−1.8
Majority		11,218	28.6	−4.6
Turnout		39,168	72.3	−3.3
Conservative hold		Swing	-2.3	

=== Elections in the 1970s ===
General election 1970: Perth and East Perthshire
Party	Candidate	Votes	%	±%
Conservative	Ian MacArthur	21,860	52.1	−4.4
Labour	Valerie A. Friel	9,972	23.8	−4.1
SNP	Duncan C. Murray	7,112	17.0	+1.4
Liberal	Richard Livsey	3,011	7.2	New
Majority		11,888	28.3	−0.3
Turnout		41,955	73.5	+1.2
Conservative hold		Swing	-0.2	

General election February 1974: Perth and East Perthshire
Party	Candidate	Votes	%	±%
Conservative	Ian MacArthur	21,167	47.3	−4.8
SNP	Douglas Crawford	12,192	27.2	+3.4
Labour	Valerie A. Friel	6,784	15.2	−8.6
Liberal	K. Smith	4,644	10.4	+3.2
Majority		8,975	20.1	−8.2
Turnout		44,787	78.3	+4.8
Conservative hold		Swing		

General election October 1974: Perth and East Perthshire
Party	Candidate	Votes	%	±%
SNP	Douglas Crawford	17,337	40.8	+13.6
Conservative	Ian MacArthur	16,544	38.9	−8.4
Labour	J. White	5,805	13.7	−1.5
Liberal	R. Duncan	2,851	6.7	−3.7
Majority		793	1.9	N/A
Turnout		42,537	73.8	−4.5
SNP gain from Conservative		Swing	+11.0	

General election 1979: Perth and East Perthshire
Party	Candidate	Votes	%	±%
Conservative	William Connoll Walker	20,153	42.0	+3.1
SNP	Douglas Crawford	17,050	35.5	−5.3
Labour	W.F. McKenzie	6,432	13.4	−0.3
Liberal	B. Goudie	4,410	9.2	+2.5
Majority		3,103	6.5	N/A
Turnout		48,045	77.3	+3.5
Conservative gain from SNP		Swing	+4.2	
