= Brigg and Goole =

UK Parliament constituency (1997–2024)

- Former county constituency for the House of Commons
- 2010–2024 boundary of Brigg and Goole in the former county of Humberside

- Location of the former county of Humberside within England
- County: North Lincolnshire, East Riding of Yorkshire
- Population: 86,706 (2011 census)
- Electorate: 64,365 (December 2019)
- Major settlements: Brigg, Goole

1997–2024
- Seats: One
- Created from: Boothferry; Glanford & Scunthorpe; Brigg & Cleethorpes
- Replaced by: Goole and Pocklington; Doncaster East & the Isle of Axholme; Brigg and Immingham; Scunthorpe

Brigg and Goole was a constituency in Yorkshire and Lincolnshire (Note: A county constituency (for the purposes of election expenses and type of returning officer))It existed from 1997 to 2024. (Note: As with all constituencies, the constituency elects one Member of Parliament (MP) by the first past the post system of election at least every five years.)

The constituency was among a small minority of constituencies that span two ceremonial counties, in this case Lincolnshire and the East Riding of Yorkshire.

The industrial port of Goole was the biggest settlement in the constituency. There were over 70 towns and villages in the constituency, including the Lodge Moor and Skippingdale areas of Scunthorpe. The constituency also included part of the Scunthorpe Steel Works and the Scunthorpe United football ground, as well as the Isle of Axholme.

The constituency was split across North Lincolnshire and the East Riding of Yorkshire and borders South Yorkshire, North Yorkshire, Nottinghamshire and Lincolnshire.

The seat was abolished for the 2024 general election.

== History ==
Brigg and Goole constituency was created for the 1997 general election from parts of the seats of Boothferry, Glanford & Scunthorpe and Brigg & Cleethorpes.

In the 2007 local elections the Conservatives won 12 of the Council seats in the constituency compared to 6 for Labour, 2 for the Liberal Democrats and 1 Independent. (Note: Conservatives gained Wards including: Burringham and Gunness and the Snaith, Airmyn, Rawcliffe and The Marshlands in the 2007 elections.)

In 2010 Andrew Percy won the Brigg and Goole constituency for the first time at the 2010 general election, ending 13 years of representation by the Labour Party. The Liberal Democrats amassed their largest share of the vote since the seat's creation in 1997.

In the 2011 local elections the Conservatives made further progress, winning 3 seats from Labour and one from the Independents. The Conservatives now have 15 councillors, compared to 5 for Labour (2 gains from the Liberal Dems) and one Independent. The Conservatives also increased their share of vote compared to 2007.

In the 2015 general election, the Conservatives received their highest vote ever in the constituency, with Labour receiving their lowest number of votes. Following the council elections held on the same day, the Conservatives now have 16 Councillors in this constituency, 14 on North Lincs Council and 2 on the East Riding of Yorkshire Council. Labour have a record low 4 Councillors and there is 1 Independent.

At the 2017 general election, the Conservatives again recorded a swing towards them from Labour, against both the regional and national swings.

In the 2019 local Council elections Labour lost all of their Council seats in the constituency with the Conservatives gaining 3 Council seats. Currently there are 19 Conservative Councillors in the constituency (15 sitting on North Lincs Council and 4 sitting on the East Riding of Yorkshire Council) and 2 Independent Councillors. Incumbent MP Andrew Percy got re-elected with 71.3% of the vote, making it one of the safer Conservative seats in all of Britain in spite of having been held by Labour merely ten years before.

== Boundaries ==
Map of boundaries 1997–2024

The Borough of North Lincolnshire wards of Axholme Central, Axholme North, Axholme South, Brigg and Wolds, Broughton and Appleby, Burringham and Gunness, and Burton upon Stather and Winterton, and the District of East Riding of Yorkshire wards of Goole North, Goole South, and Snaith, Airmyn, Rawcliffe and Marshland.

== Members of Parliament ==
Elections	Member	Party
1997	Ian Cawsey	Labour
2010	Andrew Percy	Conservative
2024	Constituency abolished	

== Election results 1997–2024 ==
=== Elections in the 1990s ===
1992 notional result
Party	Vote	
Conservative	25,499	49.8
Labour	18,258	35.7
Liberal Democrats	7,406	14.5
Turnout	48,089	81.2
Electorate	63,013	

General election 1997: Brigg and Goole
Party	Candidate	Votes	%	±%
Labour	Ian Cawsey	23,493	50.2	+14.5
Conservative	Donald M. Stewart	17,104	36.5	−13.3
Liberal Democrats	Mary-Rose Hardy	4,692	10.0	−4.5
Referendum	Derek M. Rigby	1,513	3.2	New
Majority		6,389	13.7	N/A
Turnout		46,802	73.5	−7.7
Registered electors		63,648		
Labour win (new seat)				

=== Elections in the 2000s ===
General election 2001: Brigg and Goole
Party	Candidate	Votes	%	±%
Labour	Ian Cawsey	20,066	48.9	−1.3
Conservative	Donald M. Stewart	16,105	39.2	+2.7
Liberal Democrats	David P. Nolan	3,796	9.2	−0.8
UKIP	Godfrey Bloom	688	1.7	New
Socialist Labour	Michael A. Kenny	399	1.0	New
Majority		3,961	9.7	−4.0
Turnout		41,054	63.5	−8.9
Registered electors		63,536		
Labour hold		Swing	−2.0	

General election 2005: Brigg and Goole
Party	Candidate	Votes	%	±%
Labour	Ian Cawsey	19,257	45.2	−3.7
Conservative	Matthew Bean	16,363	38.4	−0.8
Liberal Democrats	Gary Johnson	5,690	13.4	+4.2
UKIP	Stephen Martin	1,268	3.0	+1.3
Majority		2,894	6.8	−2.9
Turnout		42,578	63.2	−0.3
Registered electors		67,364		
Labour hold		Swing	−1.5	

2005 notional result
Party	Vote	%
Labour	18,895	45.8
Conservative	15,659	38.0
Liberal Democrats	5,461	13.2
Others	1,225	3.0
Turnout	41,240	63.2
Electorate	65,248	

=== Elections in the 2010s ===
General election 2010: Brigg and Goole
Party	Candidate	Votes	%	±%
Conservative	Andrew Percy	19,680	44.9	+6.9
Labour	Ian Cawsey	14,533	33.1	−12.7
Liberal Democrats	Richard Nixon	6,414	14.6	+1.4
UKIP	Nigel Wright	1,749	4.0	+1.0
BNP	Steve Ward	1,498	3.4	New
Majority		5,147	11.8	N/A
Turnout		43,875	65.1	+1.9
Registered electors		67,345		
Conservative gain from Labour		Swing	+9.8	

General election 2015: Brigg and Goole
Party	Candidate	Votes	%	±%
Conservative	Andrew Percy	22,946	53.0	+8.1
Labour	Jacky Crawford	11,770	27.2	−5.9
UKIP	David Jeffreys	6,694	15.5	+11.5
Green	Natalie Hurst	915	2.1	New
Liberal Democrats	Liz Leffman	764	1.8	−12.8
Independent	Trevor Dixon	153	0.4	New
An Independence from Europe	Ray Spalding	28	0.1	New
Majority		11,176	25.8	+14.0
Turnout		43,270	63.2	−1.9
Registered electors		68,486		
Conservative hold		Swing	+7.1	

General election 2017: Brigg and Goole
Party	Candidate	Votes	%	±%
Conservative	Andrew Percy	27,219	60.4	+7.4
Labour	Terence Smith	14,856	33.0	+5.8
UKIP	David Jeffreys	1,596	3.5	−12.0
Liberal Democrats	Jerry Lonsdale	836	1.9	+0.1
Green	Isabel Pires	550	1.2	−0.9
Majority		12,363	27.4	+1.6
Turnout		45,057	68.2	+5.0
Registered electors		66,069		
Conservative hold		Swing	+0.8	

General election 2019: Brigg and Goole
Party	Candidate	Votes	%	±%
Conservative	Andrew Percy	30,941	71.3	+10.9
Labour	Majid Khan	9,000	20.7	−12.3
Liberal Democrats	David Dobbie	2,180	5.0	+3.1
Green	Jo Baker	1,281	3.0	+1.8
Majority		21,941	50.6	+23.2
Turnout		43,402	65.8	−2.4
Registered electors		65,939		
Conservative hold		Swing	+11.6	

== See also ==
- List of parliamentary constituencies in Humberside
