= North Tayside (UK Parliament constituency) =

UK Parliament constituency (1983–2005)

- Former county constituency for the House of Commons
- Boundary of North Tayside in Scotland for the 2001 general election
- Subdivisions of Scotland: Tayside

1983–2005
- Seats: One
- Created from: Perth & East Perthshire, Angus South and Kinross & West Perthshire
- Replaced by: Angus; Perth & North Perthshire

North Tayside was a county constituency represented in the House of Commons of the Parliament of the United Kingdom from 1983 until 2005. It elected one Member of Parliament (MP) by the first-past-the-post voting system.

The constituency was abolished for the 2005 general election, after which the area was represented by the constituencies of Angus and Perth and North Perthshire. Since the 2024 general election, the area has been covered by Angus and Perthshire Glens, in accordance with the 2023 review of Westminster constituencies, of which the boundaries are very similar to the old North Tayside.

The Scottish Parliament constituency of North Tayside, which covered the same area, was in existence from 1999 to 2011. The Angus and Perthshire Glens constituency created in 2024 has near identical boundaries to the old North Tayside seat.

== Boundaries ==
1983–1997: The Angus District electoral divisions of Forfar East and Dunnichen, Forfar West and Strathmore, Kirriemuir, and Western Glens, and the Perth and Kinross District electoral divisions of Atholl, Breadalbane and Rannoch; St Martin's; Strathardle; Strathisla; and Strathtay.

1997–2005: The Angus District electoral divisions of Brechin and Eastern Glens, Forfar East, Forfar West, and Kirriemuir and Western Glens; and the Perth and Kinross District electoral divisions of Alyth and Coupar Angus; Blairgowrie and Glenshee; Dunkeld and Strathtay; Pitlochry, Aberfeldy and Rannoch; and Scone and St Martin's.

== Members of Parliament ==
Election	Member	Party
1983	Bill Walker	Conservative
1997	John Swinney	SNP
2001	Pete Wishart	SNP
2005	constituency abolished	

== Election results ==
=== Elections of the 1980s ===
General election 1983: North Tayside
Party	Candidate	Votes	%	±%
Conservative	Bill Walker	19,269	51.0	+4.5
SNP	Alasdair Morgan	9,170	24.3	−17.4
Liberal	Danus Skene	7,255	19.2	+11.0
Labour	Noel Wylie	2,057	5.5	+1.9
Majority		10,099	26.7	+21.9
Turnout		37,751	72.6	
Conservative win (new seat)				

General election 1987: North Tayside
Party	Candidate	Votes	%	±%
Conservative	Bill Walker	18,307	45.4	−5.6
SNP	Kenneth Guild	13,291	32.9	+8.6
Liberal	Peter Regent	5,201	12.9	−6.3
Labour	James Whytock	3,550	8.8	+3.3
Majority		5,016	12.5	−14.2
Turnout		40,349	74.7	+2.1
Conservative hold		Swing	−7.1	

=== Elections of the 1990s ===
General election 1992: North Tayside
Party	Candidate	Votes	%	±%
Conservative	Bill Walker	20,283	46.7	+1.3
SNP	John Swinney	16,288	37.5	+4.6
Liberal Democrats	Simon Horner	3,791	8.7	−4.2
Labour	Thomas Maclennan	3,094	7.1	−1.7
Majority		3,995	9.2	−3.3
Turnout		43,456	77.6	+2.9
Conservative hold		Swing	−0.7	

General election 1997: North Tayside
Party	Candidate	Votes	%	±%
SNP	John Swinney	20,447	44.8	+6.1
Conservative	Bill Walker	16,287	35.7	−10.6
Labour	Ian McFatridge	5,141	11.3	+4.3
Liberal Democrats	Peter Regent	3,716	8.2	+0.3
Majority		4,160	9.1	N/A
Turnout		45,591	74.3	−3.3
SNP gain from Conservative		Swing	+8.4	

=== Elections of the 2000s ===
General election 2001: North Tayside
Party	Candidate	Votes	%	±%
SNP	Pete Wishart	15,441	40.1	−4.7
Conservative	Murdo Fraser	12,158	31.6	−4.1
Labour	Thomas Docherty	5,715	14.8	+3.5
Liberal Democrats	Julia Robertson	4,365	11.3	+3.1
Scottish Socialist	Rosie Adams	620	1.6	New
Independent	Tina MacDonald	220	0.6	New
Majority		3,283	8.5	−0.6
Turnout		38,519	62.5	−11.8
SNP hold		Swing		
