= An Ubhal as Àirde (The Highest Apple) =

Single by Runrig

from the album The Cutter and the Clan
- B-side: "Abhainn An T-Sluaigh"
- Released: 1995
- Studio: Castlesound Studios, Edinburgh, Scotland
- Label: Chrysalis – CDCHS 5018
- Songwriter(s): C. Macdonald; R. Macdonald
- Producer(s): Calum Malcolm

Runrig singles chronology
"This Time of Year" (1994)	"An Ubhal as Àirde (The Highest Apple)" (1995)	"Things That Are" (1995)

"An Ubhal as Àirde (The Highest Apple)" is a 1995 single released by Scottish celtic rock band Runrig, which first appeared on their album The Cutter and the Clan (1987). The song was released as a single in 1995, eight years following the release of its accompanying album, following its popularity after being used in television advertisement for Carlsberg.

The song gave Runrig their highest placing to date on the UK Singles Charts, becoming their first UK Top 20, debuting at number eighteen in May 1995. The song made history when it came the first song to be sung in Scottish Gaelic to chart on the UK Singles Chart.

== Release and performance ==
The song was released in 1995, and marked the second stand alone single to be released by the band. Upon its release, Billboard claimed that the song was aiming for "major chart success" in the United Kingdom, primarily as a result of its use in a television advert for Carlsberg lagger. During the period of promotion for the song, Runrig were the special guests at a concert held by singer Rod Stewart at the Pittodrie Stadium on 8 June 1995. During this period, Billboard described Runrig as one of the "most celebrated" Gaelic language bands in Scotland.

It debuted at number eighteen on the UK Singles Charts, the bands highest performance on the UK Singles Charts and would remain so until the re–release of "Loch Lomond" in 2007 with the Tartan Army, known as "Loch Lomond (Hampden Remix)" debuted at number nine on the UK Singles Charts. "An Ubhal as Àirde (The Highest Apple)" remained at number eighteen in the United Kingdom in its second week, before falling to number thirty in its third week. By the fourth week of its appearance on the UK Singles Charts, it had fallen out the UK Top 40 to number forty-nine, before slipping to number seventy-four in its fifth and final week.

In their native Scotland, its performance fared better, following its debut at number three on the Scottish Singles Charts in May 1995. In its second and third week, it remained in the Scottish Top 10 Singles Charts, dropping to number five and then number nine respectively. By its fourth week, it had dropped to number twenty-four, before falling into the Top 30 of the Scottish Singles Charts in its fifth week.

== Promotion ==
Runrig performed the song on Top of the Pops, broadcast by the BBC on 4 May 1995.

== Track listing ==
=== CD single (UK) ===
1. "An Ubhal As Airde (The Highest Apple)" (Engineer – Beeg Al, Keith Mitchell)
2. "Abhainn An T-Sluaigh" (Mixed by Calum Malcolm, Chris Harley)
3. "The Greatest Flame" (Engineer – Calum Malcolm)
4. "Flower of the West" (Mixed by Calum Malcolm)

=== Cassette (UK) ===
1. "An Ubhal As Airde (The Highest Apple)"
2. "Abhainn An T - Sluaigh"
3. "The Greatest Flame"

== Chart performance ==
Chart (1995)	Peak position
Scotland (OCC)	3
UK Singles (OCC)	18
