= Big Burns Supper Festival =

Scottish music festival

Big Burns Supper
- Genre: Performing Arts Festival, Scottish Music Festival
- Locations: Dumfries, Scotland
- Years active: 2012–present
- Founders: Graham Main

The Big Burns Supper Festival (Big Burns Supper) is an international Scottish music festival and performing arts festival of music, theatre, comedy and cabaret which takes place annually in Dumfries in south Scotland every January.

The eleven-day festival celebrates Burns Night (Scots: Burns Nicht) which is one of Scotland's key national events celebrating the life of Robert Burns through a gathering of friends and family which is known as a Burns Supper. A Burns Supper is part of Scottish Culture dating back to the 17th Century.

The festival in Dumfries is thought to be the largest event of its type in the world attracting over 26,000 people per year and takes place at the festival village which includes the Famous Spiegeltent. The festival is the birthplace of Le Haggis, a Cabaret show, was created in 2013 as a way to modernise Burns Supper's and has included guest appearances from Ursula Martinez, Miss Behave, Jess Robinson, Talisk, and other Celtic music bands.

== History ==
Big Burns Supper was founded by Graham Main in 2011, who celebrated Burns Night with friends across the world and invited them to his hometown Dumfries on 25 January 2010, only to discover that there were no events that local people or visitors could take part in. He spotted an opportunity and created the Charity Trust that would take forward the idea alongside partners The Holywood Trust whose Trustees include the late Charles Jencks and EventScotland.

The first festival opened on 25 January 2012 with a community theatre performance which included four characters that had been trapped in time which was presented on four giant screens. Eddi Reader played a concert at DG One, and Frisky & Mannish presented a comedy show at Theatre Royal, Dumfries.

The festival opened a building in the centre of Dumfries called Electric Theatre Workshop which accommodated year-round community arts, including Dumfries Community Choir and Dumfries Youth Theatre. The building was officially opened by Countess Wessex on 9 May 2014.

In the second festival in 2013, a Spiegeltent was introduced to the programme which would become the festival hub and include different performances, many of which were created at the Electric Theatre Workshop. Deacon Blue made their first appearance in the South of Scotland, Manu Delago and Anda Union performed in the Spiegeltent, the festival's mascot Hamish the Haggis was also created.

Between 2014 and 2016, the festival continued to grow, presenting artists like Black Grape, Red Bastard, Andrew Maxwell and Nassim Soleimanpour. Hextor Bizerk played a gig in Dumfries Prison. A debate was motioned in the Scottish Parliament about the festival by Joan McAlpine MSP.

In 2017 the festival moved to a temporary base at The Crichton and created the festival village. This wasn't accepted by the festival fans who started a campaign, ‘nae-Spiegel nae-party’ to protest over the move. Festival organisers confirmed that they would be relocating the Spiegeltent back to the centre of Dumfries for the 2018 programme.

2018 was the festivals biggest programme, and also included the development of the Container Theatre which was adapted from old shipping containers. Bill Bailey, KT Tunstall, Frank Turner and Donovan all performed in the Spiegeltent.

In 2020, due to the COVID-19 pandemic, the festival presented free content on its Facebook and YouTube channels through a Lockdown Festival between April and May, and Dumfries TV which ran for six episodes between August and October.

== Artists ==
Artists that have appeared at the festival include: Frank Turner, Keb Mo, Eddi Reader, Vicky Butterfly, The Dubliners, KT Tunstall, Deacon Blue, Bill Bailey, Ed Byrne, Public Service Broadcasting, Manu Delago, Turin Brakes, Morcheeba, Seth Lakeman, Camille O’Sullivan, Dervish, Hazel O'Connor, London Community Gospel Choir, Skerryvore, Jason Byrne and the Peatbog Faeries, Ocean Wisdom, Bay City Rollers, Dangleberries, Worbey & Farrell, Badly Drawn Boy, We Banjo 3, Trumpageddon, Donovan, Marcel Lucont, Hope and Social, Soul Nation Choir, Brian Molley Quartet, Dougie MacLean and Monski Mouse, Peatbog Faeries, Colonel Mustard and the Dijon 5, Bombskare, London Community Gospel Choir, Birds of Chicago, Baby Love Disco, Hardeep Singh Kohli, Hans Like a German, Hebrides Ensemble, Frank Turner, Jock Tamson's Bairns, Ed Byrne, Craig Charles Funk and Soul, Brainiac Live, Talisk, Tide Lines, Bootleg Beatles, Alabama 3, The Troggs, The Complete Stone Roses, Manran, Turbyne, Vishten, Calan, Absolute Elvis, Keb' Mo', The Strange Doors, The Kingdom Choir, Gary Stewart's Graceland, Newton Faulkner, Band of Burns, Rura, Turbyne, The Lutras, Claire Hastings, Smith & McClennan, The Felice Brothers, Hue and Cry, Turin Brakes, Mr B the Gentleman Rhymer, Morcheeba, ONR, Hardwicke Circus, Skerryvore, Glenn Miller Orchestra, Elephant Sessions, Electric Swing Circus, Peat & Diesel, Nicola Benedetti, Craig Hill, Hector Bizerk, Charlie Landsborough, King Creosote, Ukulele Orchestra of Great Britain.

== See also ==
- Edinburgh Festival
- List of Celtic festivals
