= Ímar (band) =

Folk band from the British Isles

Background information
- Origin: Glasgow, Scotland
- Genres: Celtic music, English folk music, Scottish folk music, Manx folk music
- Years active: 2016–present
- Labels: Big Mann Records
- Members: Adam Brown; Ryan Murphy; Tomás Callister; Adam Rhodes; Mohsen Amini
- Website: www.imarband.com

Ímar are a folk band from Britain and Ireland, founded in 2016 in Glasgow, Scotland. They won the Horizon Award for Best Emerging Act at the 2018 BBC Radio 2 Folk Awards.

== History ==
The members of Ímar first met as teenagers through the Comhaltas Ceoltóirí Éireann tutoring program. They reunited in Glasgow and formed the band in 2016, naming it after the Viking warlord Ímar. The profile of the band rose quickly, bolstered by their individual reputations as members of several prominent ensembles. In 2018, the band won the Horizon Award for Best Emerging Act at the BBC Radio 2 Folk Awards.

== Musical style ==
Ímar are a purely instrumental band. Their musical style is derived from the folk music traditions of the nations of each member – Brown is English, Murphy is Irish, Callister and Rhodes are Manx, and Amini is Scottish. Murphy notes that their style is "more of a pure-drop trad sound than most of the other bands we’re involved in". In a review, Johnny Whalley of Folk Radio UK notes that "while the general description 'Celtic' might be appropriate, their music, in fact, derives firmly from the Irish tradition with polkas and slides interspersed with the more generic jigs and reels". He highlights the "intensity, energy and, above all, precision" of their sets. Mike Wade of IOM Today describes their work as "fast, driving tunes, bouncing, infectious reels and slow, beautiful melodic numbers, highlighting individual skills of each player".

== Band members ==
- Adam Brown – Bodhrán
- Ryan Murphy – Flute, tin whistle, and uilleann pipes
- Tomás Callister – Fiddle
- Adam Rhodes – Bouzouki
- Mohsen Amini – Concertina

== Discography ==
- Afterlight (2017)
- Avalanche (2018)
- Awakening (2023)

== See also ==
- Mànran
- RURA
- Barrule
- Talisk
- Jamie Smith's Mabon
