= Ewen Henderson (musician) =

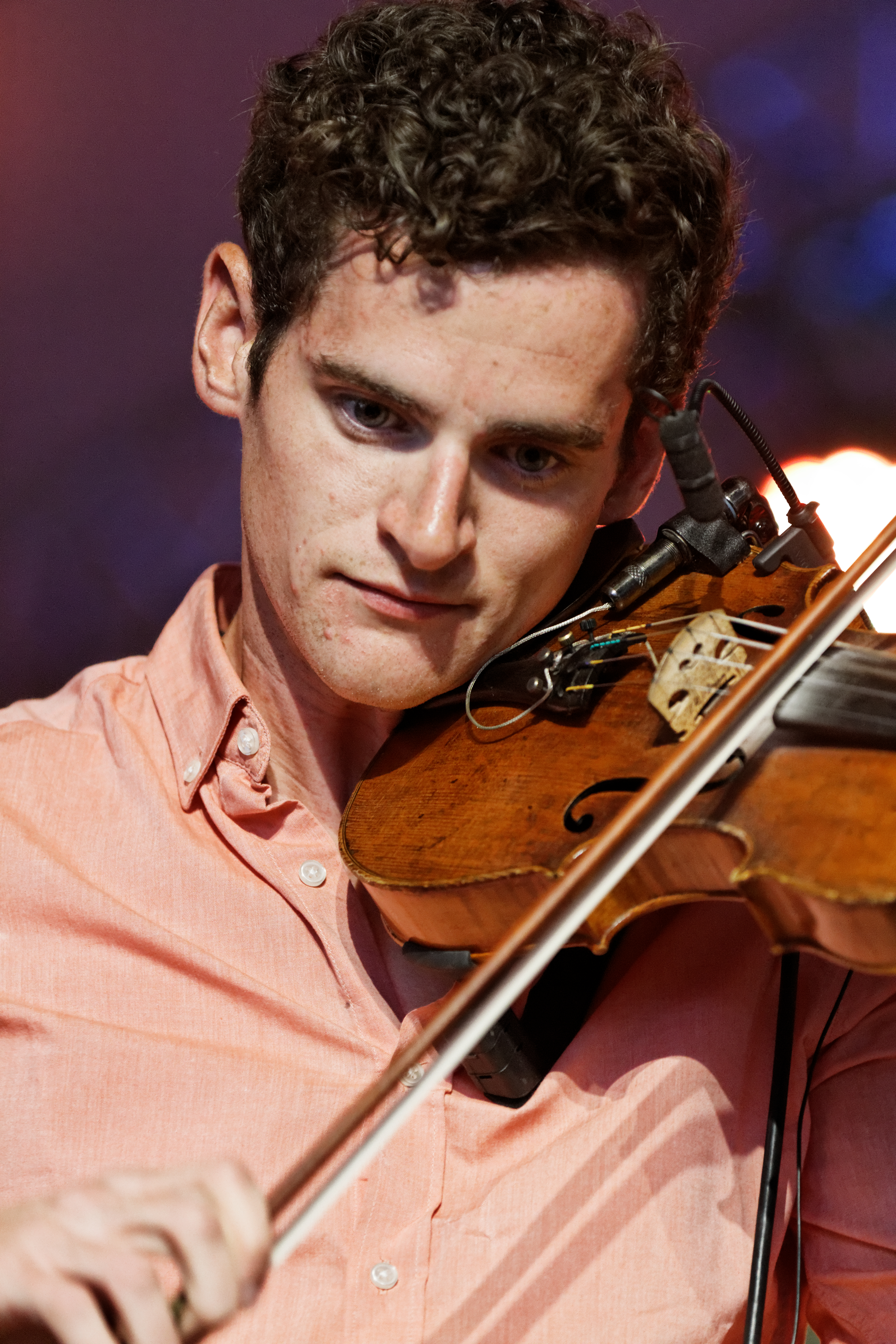
- Henderson in 2013

Background information
- Born: Ewen Alistair Henderson; 1987 (age 38–39); Fort William, Inverness-shire, Scotland
- Genres: Folk; folk rock; Gaelic; world music
- Occupation: Musician
- Instruments: Fiddle; bagpipe; penny whistle; piano; vocals
- Member of: Mànran
- Website: ewen-henderson.com

Ewen Alistair Henderson (born 1987; Scottish Gaelic: Eòghann Mac Eunraig) is a Scottish multi-instrumentalist folk musician and a member of Scottish musical group Mànran.

== Musical career ==
Henderson comes from a musical family, with his sisters Megan (of Breabach) and Ingrid (of Glenfinnan Ceilidh Band) and brother Allan (formerly of Blazin' Fiddles) in particular being musicians of renown. He started learning the fiddle at the age of five under the tutelage of Aonghas Grant Snr, the left handed fiddler of Lochaber, who gave Henderson the iconic "Red Tassel".

Besides fiddle, Ewen regularly performs on bagpipe, penny whistle and piano. He is also fluent in Scottish Gaelic and sings in the language.

He has been a member of Battlefield Band (2010–2014), the Pneumatic Drills and Skipinnish but is currently most often found performing with Mànran, the band he helped found in 2010 alongside Gary Innes host of "Take The Floor" on BBC Radio Scotland. His Scottish Gaelic singing has been aired on BBC Alba broadcasts. Since 2015, Ewen has also performed regularly with World music pioneers the Afro Celt Sound System.

Henderson is in high demand as a composer and created the soundtrack to the 2016 BBC Alba documentary "The Wee Govan Gadgies/ Pìobairean Beaga Bhaile Ghobhainn". and was involved in the soundtrack for ITV drama Sanditon. He has also worked regularly as a Musical Director, including "Strì is Buaidh: Strife and Success" at 2017's Celtic Connections festival, a show covering Gaelic political music over the last 600 years, several series' of BBC Alba's Alleluia! and the opening concert of the 2022 Royal National Mòd

Since 2021, Henderson has also been working as a broadcaster, notably on BBC Radio Scotland's Piping Sounds programme and BBC Radio nan Gàidheal's Crùnluath. These shows won the award for Trad Music in the Media at the 2024 Scots Trad Music Awards.

Henderson's 2024 solo album, Lèirsinn - Perception was named one of the best folk albums of 2024 by The Scotsman newspaper.

== Personal life ==
Married to Maria in 2019, the couple have three children together.

A keen follower of the sport shinty, he has played for Glasgow University Shinty Club.

== Discography ==
=== With Mànran ===
- 2011: Latha Math (Single)
- 2011: Mànran
- 2013: The Test
- 2017: An Dà Là / The Two Days
- 2021: Ùrar

=== With Battlefield Band ===
- 2011: Line-up
- 2013: Room Enough For All

=== With The Donnchadh Bàn Boys ===
- 2014: Mìorbhail nam Beann

=== With Afro Celt Sound System ===
- 2016: The Source

=== Solo ===
- 2020: Steall
- 2024: Lèirsinn - Perception
