= Òran na Cloiche =

Song by Donald MacIntyre

Òran na Cloiche ("Song of the Stone") is a Scottish Gaelic song, written by poet Donald MacIntyre (Scottish Gaelic: Dòmhnall Mac an t-Saoir), also known as the Paisley Bard (Scottish Gaelic: Bàrd Phàislig). It celebrates the return of the Stone of Destiny to Scotland, which was retrieved from Westminster Abbey on Christmas Day, 1950 by students. A fierce lifetime supporter of the nationalist cause, the bard wrote the 25 verse song in a single sitting immediately upon hearing the news of the stone's return, and some of the students involved visited him at his home to congratulate him on the song's composition in the weeks following. While Òran na Cloiche is sung to the tune of a fast reel (occasionally performed as an instrumental reel, including by Michael McGoldrick as the "Stone of Destiny Reel"), and is celebratory and exhilaratory in tone; upon hearing the news of the stone's return to England, the bard composed an accompanying lament, titled "Nuair Chaidh a' Chlach a Thilleadh" ("When the Stone Was Returned") to express his disgust.

The full text of the poem was included in a posthumous collection of the bard's work, titled Sporan Dhòmhnaill - Gaelic Poems and Songs by the late Donald Macintyre, the Paisley Bard, published by Scottish Academic Press for the Scottish Gaelic Text Society in Edinburgh in 1968. Abridged versions have been more recently performed by Gaelic singer Kathleen MacInnes on her Òg-Mhadainn Shamhraidh album, Scottish folk band Mànran from their eponymous debut album, and Gaelic metalcore band Gun Ghaol from their debut album.
