= Mànran (album) =

Studio album by Mànran
- Released: 15 July 2011 (UK)
- Recorded: Castlesound Studio, Pencaitland, Scotland
- Genre: Celtic rock
- Length: 48:06
- Label: Mànran
- Producer: Phil Cunningham

Mànran is a 2011 album, the debut LP by Scottish Celtic rock band Mànran. It includes their download single "Latha Math".

It won the award for "Album of the Year" at the 2011 Scots Trad Music Awards.

== Track listing ==
1. Fingal's Cave - 3:00
2. Reels - 3:33
3. Glaodh an Iar - 3:51
4. Oran na Cloiche - 3:05
5. Speybay Switch - 5:56
6. Maraiche nan Aigh - 4:45
7. The Open Door - 3:47
8. Latha Math - 3:31
9. Scottische - 5:04
10. An Eala Bhàn - 4:49
11. Chasing Daylight - 3:11
12. Puirt - 3:34

== Personnel ==
- Scott MacKay: drums, percussion
- Norrie MacIver: lead vocals
- Gary Innes: accordion keyboard
- Calum Stewart: flute, small pipes
- Ewen Henderson: bagpipes, fiddle
- Ross Saunders: bass

=== Additional musicians ===
- Phil Cunningham
