= Mabon =

Mabon may refer to:

== Culture ==
- Mabon, the name of the autumnal equinox in some versions of the Wheel of the Year
- Mabon ap Modron, a figure in Welsh Arthurian legend
- Maponos, a pre-Christian Celtic god
- Mabyn or Mabon, an early Cornish saint
- Jamie Smith's Mabon, a Welsh folk band active from 1998 to 2020

== People ==
- Willie Mabon (1925–1985), American singer and songwriter
- Dickson Mabon (1925–2008), Scottish politician
- William Abraham (trade unionist), also known as Mabon (1842-1922), Welsh politician

== Places ==
- Lochmaben, Scotland
- Lochmaben Stone, Scotland
- St Mabyn, Cornwall
- Llanfabon, Caerphilly, Wales
- Rhiwabon, Wrexham, Wales
