= Day of Days =

Day of Days may refer to:

== Film and television ==
- The Day of Days (film), a lost 1914 American adaptation of Louis Joseph Vance's novel (see below)
- Day of Days (film), a 2016 American film starring Tom Skerritt
- The Day of Days (TV series), a 2013 Hong Kong drama series
- "Day of Days" (Band of Brothers), a television episode
- "Day of Days" (WWII in HD), a television episode

== Literature ==
- "A Day of Days", an 1866 short story by Henry James
- The Day of Days, a 1913 novel by Louis Joseph Vance

== Music ==
- Day of Days (album), by Runrig, 2004
- "Day of Days", a song by Runrig from Proterra, 2003
- "Day of Days", a song by Ben Onono, 2008

== Sport ==
- Day of days is sometimes used to refer to May 25, 1935, when Jesse Owens established six athletics world records in just 45 minutes.

== See also ==
- D-Day (military term), the day on which a combat attack or operation is to be initiated
