= BBC Radio 2 Folk Awards =

Annual folk music award by BBC Radio 2

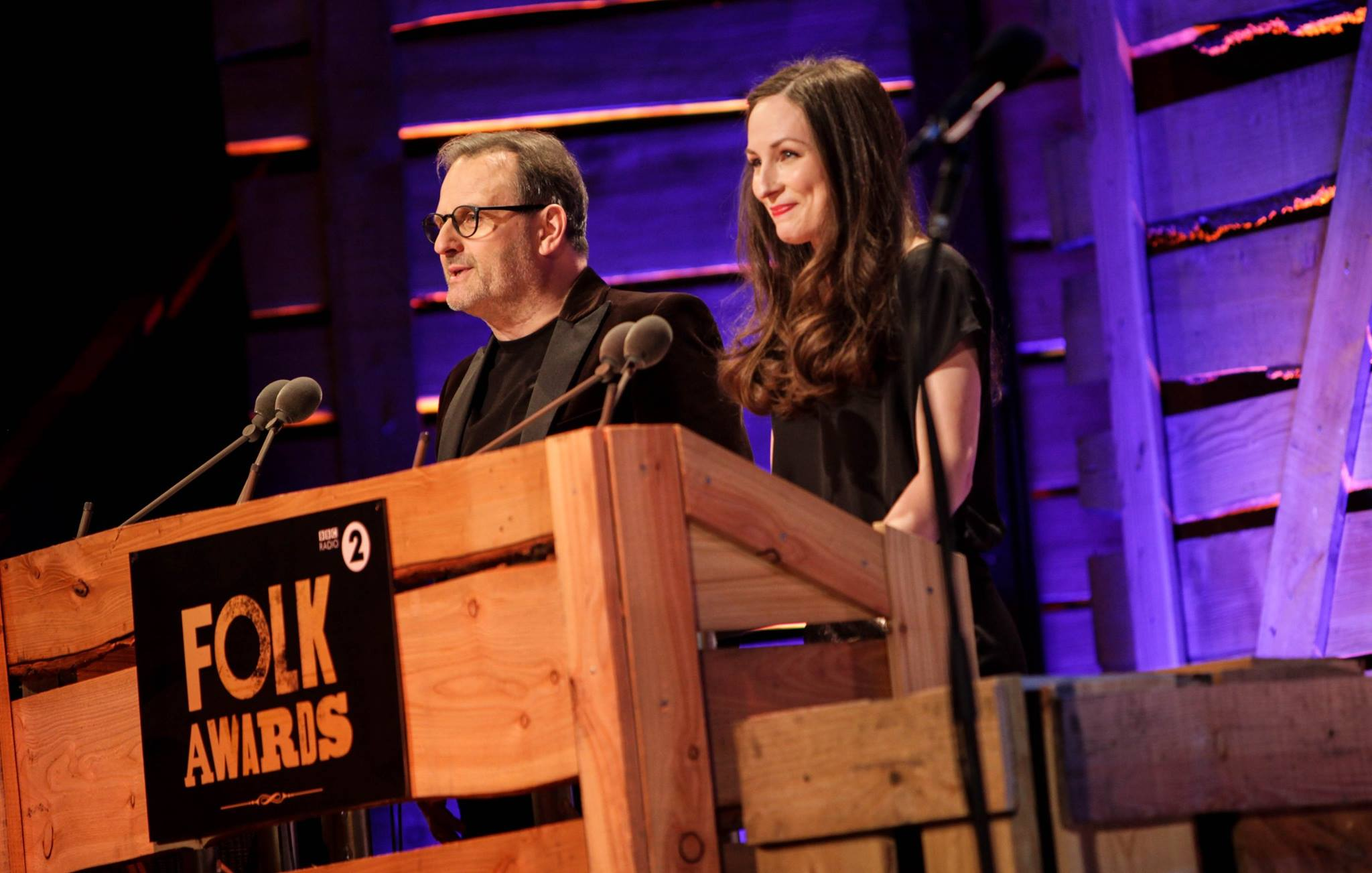
- Event hosts, Mark Radcliffe and Julie Fowlis
- Awarded for: Outstanding achievements in folk music
- Country: United Kingdom
- Presented by: BBC Radio 2
- First award: 2000; 26 years ago
- Final award: 2019; 7 years ago
- Website: bbc.co.uk/folkawards

Television/radio coverage
- Network: BBC

The BBC Radio 2 Folk Awards celebrate outstanding achievement during the previous year within the field of folk music, with the aim of raising the profile of folk and acoustic music. The awards have been given annually since 2000 by British radio station BBC Radio 2.

Award recipients have included Joan Baez, Cat Stevens, John Martyn, Steve Earle, The Dubliners, Martin Carthy, Billy Bragg, Shirley Collins, Kate Rusby, Cara Dillon, Eliza Carthy, Bellowhead, June Tabor, Oysterband, Aly Bain, Richard Thompson, Nancy Kerr, Seth Lakeman, Show of Hands, Lau, Tom Paxton, Don McLean, Ramblin' Jack Elliott, Nic Jones, Bella Hardy, Rhiannon Giddens, Norma Waterson, The Chieftains, Joan Armatrading and James Taylor.

== History ==
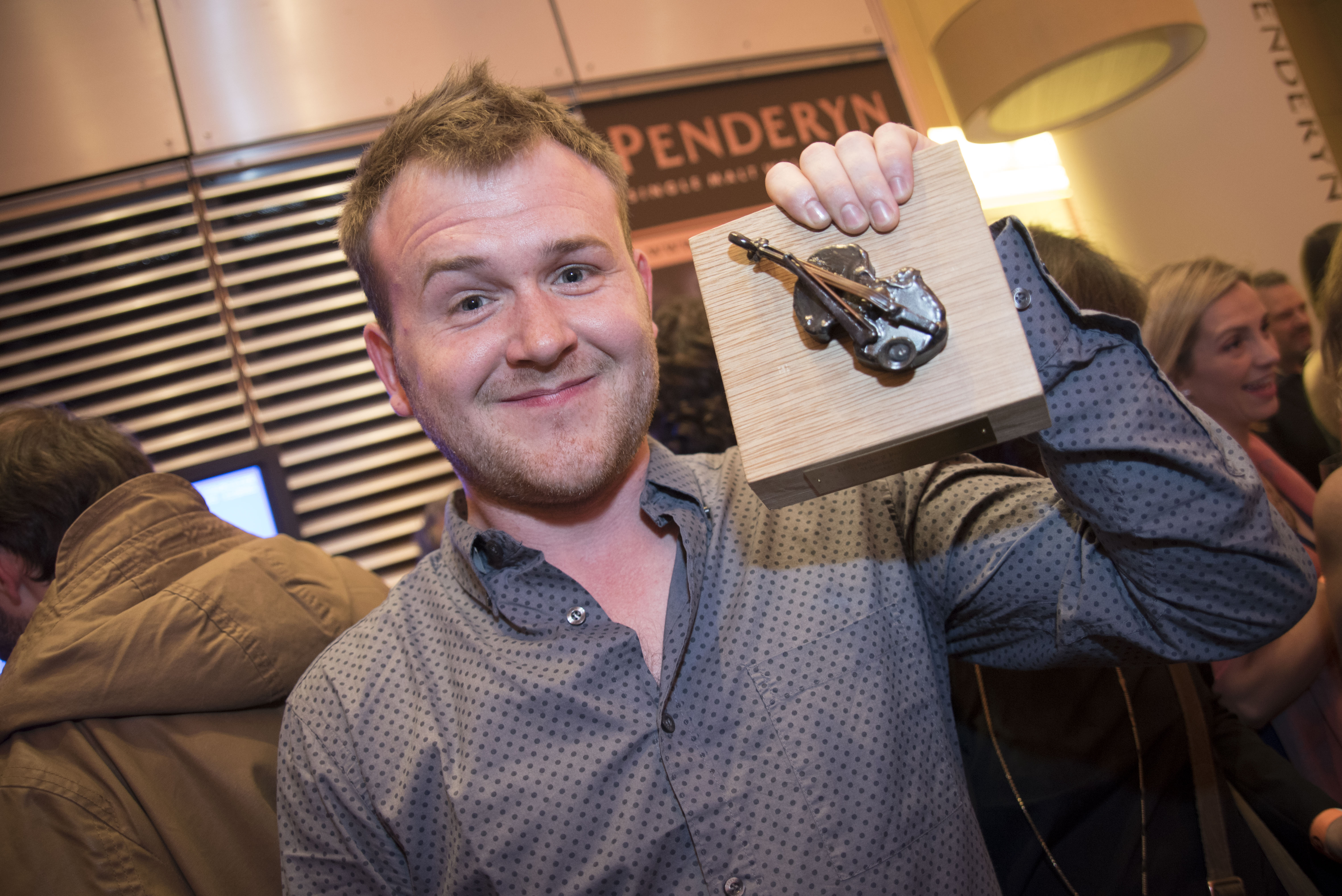
Sam Sweeney at the BBC Radio 2 Folk Awards 2015

The awards are managed by independent production company Smooth Operations, now part of 7digital. Kellie While of Smooth Operations has stated that the idea of the BBC Radio 2 Folk Awards was conceived by the company in 1999, inspired by the Country Music Awards, and brought to the BBC, and The Guardian has attributed their creation to John Leonard, who formed Smooth Operations in 1995.

The awards event has been staged in different regions of the United Kingdom, including The Brewery in London, The Lowry theatre in Salford, the Glasgow Royal Concert Hall during the 2013 Celtic Connections festival, the Bridgewater Hall during the 2019 Manchester Folk Festival, the Wales Millennium Centre, Cardiff in 2015, and the Belfast Waterfront in 2018. In 2014, 2016 and 2017, the event was held at the Royal Albert Hall in London. Reviewing the 2014 Royal Albert Hall event, Colin Irwin remarked on how much more glamorous it had become since the first event fifteen years earlier.

Between 2000 and 2012 the Folk Awards were hosted by Mike Harding, and broadcast on BBC Radio 2. Mark Radcliffe and Scottish Gaelic singer Julie Fowlis took over presenting the ceremony in 2013. In 2004 the awards were shown on television for the first time, on BBC Four. The event has been streamed live in audio and video on the BBC Radio 2 website, the BBC iPlayer and/or the BBC Red Button TV service.

The BBC Radio 2 Young Folk Award has been included in the award event since 2011, having previously been awarded in a separate ceremony, but its selection process remains independent.

In 2016, Rhiannon Giddens became the first non-British winner of the 'Folk Singer of the Year' award.

In 2020, there was no award ceremony due to the COVID-19 pandemic.

== Selection ==
The controlling body is the Folk Awards Committee, comprising two BBC staff, two from the production company 7digital Creative, and one external expert. Two Nominated Representatives, one from 7digital and one from the BBC oversee the process. The Folk Awards Committee selects a panel of 150 representatives from the British folk world, including broadcasters, journalists, record producers, festival organisers, venue bookers, record company directors, agents and promoters. The panellists vary slightly from year to year, with new panellists being invited (or self-applying) each year.

The nominations in most categories are made by the panel. The four most-nominated artists go through to the second round. The winner is then selected from the nominees by a second vote among the same panellists. Since 2013, following criticism of the lack of transparency of the selection process, there have been some exceptions to this general process. The second round of the "Best Album" category is determined by a public vote, hosted on the BBC website. The two track categories, "Best Original Track" and "Best Traditional Track" were removed from the main panel. They are now voted by a much smaller specialist panel of judges, appointed by the Folk Awards committee, whose identities are published.

Broader categories, including the "Lifetime Achievement Award" and the "Good Tradition Award" are chosen by two rounds of votes by the Folk Awards committee only. These may not be awarded every year.

The BBC Radio 2 Young Folk Award, although presented at the Folk Awards ceremony since 2011, has its own independent selection process.

The selection process has been the subject of criticism, with accusations of bias, cronyism, and lack of transparency. In 2012 The Independent reported that there had been at least two Freedom of Information requests to identify the panellists, which have been rejected by the BBC. The BBC and 7digital have responded that the panellists are kept secret to avoid lobbying and bribery.

== Compilation album ==
A Folk Awards double-album, featuring music by most of the nominees, was released annually by the event's producers in collaboration with BBC Radio 2 and the record label and distribution company, Proper Music.

== Hall of Fame ==
In 2014, a posthumous award was introduced to celebrate the contribution of significant figures in folk music's past.

- 2019 inductee: Leonard Cohen (with tribute performance by Thea Gilmore)
- 2018 inductee: Nick Drake (with tribute performance by Olivia Chaney)
- 2017 inductee: Woody Guthrie (with tribute performance by Billy Bragg)
- 2016 inductee: Sandy Denny (with tribute performance by Rufus Wainwright and original members of Fairport Convention)
- 2015 inductee: Ewan MacColl (with tribute performance by Guy Garvey and the MacColl family)
- 2014 inductee: Cecil Sharp

== Award winners ==
=== 2019 ===
- Folk Singer of the Year: Ríoghnach Connolly
- Best Duo / Group: Catrin Finch & Seckou Keita
- Horizon Award: Brìghde Chaimbeul
- Best Traditional Track: The Foggy Dew - Ye Vagabonds
- Best Original Track: I Burn but I Am Not Consumed - Karine Polwart
- Best Album: Hide and Hair - The Trials of Cato
- Musician of the Year: Seckou Keita
- Young Folk Award: Maddie Morris
- Lifetime Achievement Awards: Dervish and Wizz Jones
- Hall of Fame: Leonard Cohen

Presenter Mark Radcliffe was also presented with a special Folk Award to celebrate his 40 years in radio.

Venue: Bridgewater Hall, Manchester

=== 2018 ===
- Folk Singer of the Year: Karine Polwart
- Best Duo: Chris Stout & Catriona McKay
- Best Group: Lankum
- Best Album: Strangers - The Young'uns
- Horizon Award: Ímar
- Musician of the Year: Mohsen Amini
- Young Folk Award: Mera Royle
- Best Original Song: The Granite Gaze - Lankum
- Best Traditional Track: Banks of Newfoundland - Siobhan Miller
- Lifetime Achievement Award: Dónal Lunny
- Hall of Fame: Nick Drake
- Good Tradition: Armagh Pipers Club

Venue: Belfast Waterfront

=== 2017 ===
- Folk Singer of the Year: Kris Drever
- Best Duo: Ross Ainslie & Ali Hutton
- Best Group: The Furrow Collective
- Best Album: Songs of Separation - Songs of Separation
- Horizon Award: Daoirí Farrell
- Musician of the Year: Rachel Newton
- Young Folk Award: Josie Duncan & Pablo Lafuente
- Best Original Song: If Wishes Were Horses - Kris Drever
- Best Traditional Track: Van Diemen's Land - Daoirí Farrell
- Lifetime Achievement Awards: Al Stewart and Ry Cooder
- Hall of Fame: Woody Guthrie

Venue: Royal Albert Hall, London

=== 2016 ===
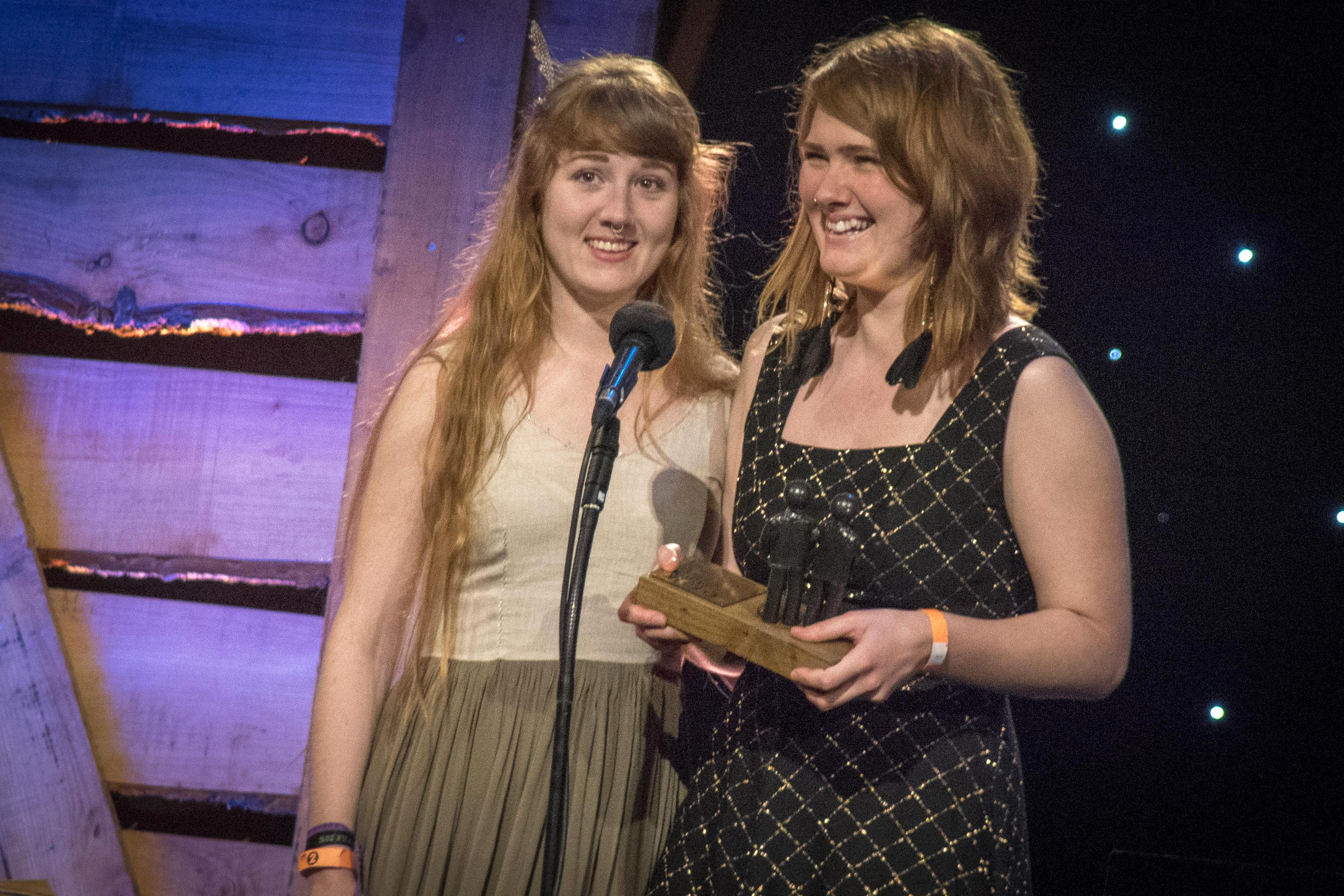
2016 Best original track: The Rheingans Sisters

- Folk Singer of the Year: Rhiannon Giddens
- Best Duo: Kathryn Roberts and Sean Lakeman
- Best Group: The Young'uns
- Best Album: Mount the Air - The Unthanks
- Horizon Award: Sam Kelly
- Musician of the Year: Andy Cutting
- Young Folk Award: Brìghde Chaimbeul
- Best Original Song: Mackerel - The Rheingans Sisters
- Best Traditional Track: Lovely Molly - Sam Lee
- Lifetime Achievement Awards: Joan Armatrading and Norma Waterson
- Good Tradition Award: John McCusker
- Hall of Fame: Sandy Denny

Venue: Royal Albert Hall, London

=== 2015 ===
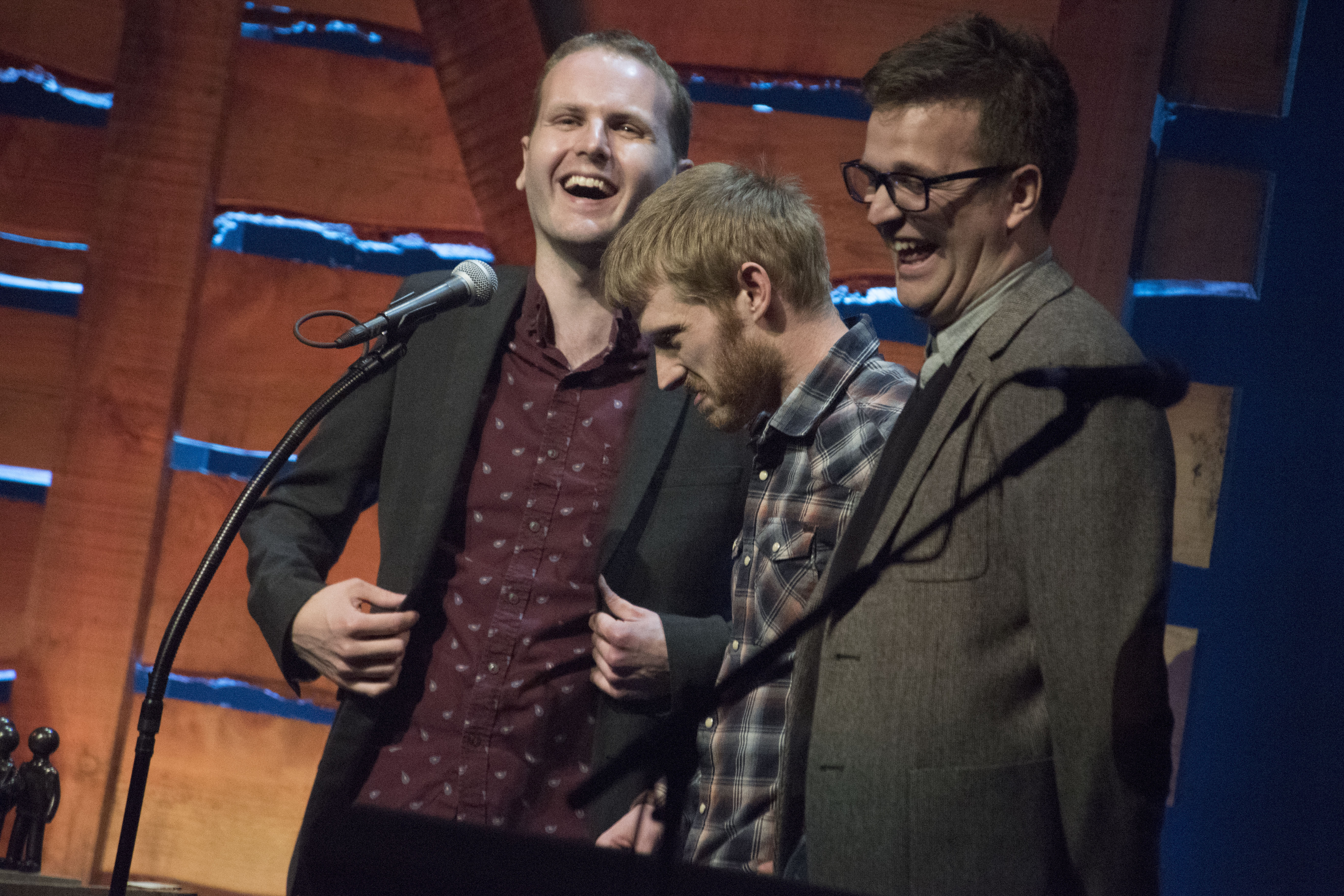
2015 Best group: The Young'Uns

- Folk Singer of the Year: Nancy Kerr
- Best Duo: Josienne Clarke & Ben Walker
- Best Group: The Young'uns
- Best Album: Tincian - 9Bach
- Horizon Award: The Rails
- Musician of the Year: Sam Sweeney
- Young Folk Award: Talisk
- Best Original Song: Swim to the Star - Peggy Seeger/Calum MacColl
- Best Traditional Track: Samhradh Samhradh - The Gloaming
- Lifetime Achievement Awards: Yusuf Islam/Cat Stevens and Loudon Wainwright III
- Good Tradition Award: Meredydd Evans
- Hall of Fame: Ewan MacColl

Venue: Millennium Centre, Cardiff

=== 2014 ===
- Folk Singer of the Year: Bella Hardy
- Best Duo: Phillip Henry & Hannah Martin
- Best Group: The Full English
- Best Album: The Full English - The Full English
- Horizon Award: Greg Russell and Ciaran Algar
- Musician of the Year: Aidan O'Rourke
- Young Folk Award: The Mischa Macpherson Trio
- Best Original Song: Two Ravens - Lisa Knapp
- Best Traditional Track: Willie of Winsbury - Anaïs Mitchell and Jefferson Hamer
- Lifetime Achievement Awards: Clannad and Martin Carthy
- Good Tradition Award: Cambridge Folk Festival
- Hall of Fame: Cecil Sharp

Venue: Royal Albert Hall, London

=== 2013 ===
- Folk singer of the year: Nic Jones
- Best Duo: Kathryn Roberts and Sean Lakeman
- Best Group: Lau
- Best Album: Broadside - Bellowhead
- Horizon Award: Blair Dunlop
- Musician of the year: Kathryn Tickell
- Young Folk Award: Greg Russell and Ciaran Algar
- Best Original Song: Hatchlings - Emily Portman
- Best Traditional Track: Lord Douglas - Jim Moray
- Lifetime achievement awards: Aly Bain and Roy Harper
- Lifetime achievement award for contribution to songwriting: Dougie MacLean
- Roots Award: Billy Bragg

Venue: Glasgow Royal Concert Hall

=== 2012 ===
- Folk Singer of the year: June Tabor
- Best Duo: Tim Edey & Brendan Power
- Best Traditional Track: Bonny Bunch of Roses - June Tabor & Oysterband
- Best Group: June Tabor & Oysterband
- Young Folk Award: Ioscaid
- Musician of the year: Tim Edey
- Best Original Song: The Herring Girl - Bella Hardy and The Reckoning – Steve Tilston
- Horizon Award: Lucy Ward
- Best Album: Ragged Kingdom – June Tabor & Oysterband
- Lifetime achievement awards: The Dubliners and Don McLean
- Best Live Act: The Home Service
- Good Tradition Award: Ian Campbell and Bill Leader
- Roots Award: Malcolm Taylor

Venue: The Lowry, Salford

=== 2011 ===
- Folk Singer of the year: Chris Wood
- Best Duo: Nancy Kerr & James Fagan
- Best Traditional Track: Poor Wayfaring Stranger - Eliza Carthy & Norma Waterson
- Best Group: Bellowhead
- Young Folk Award: Moore Moss Rutter
- Musician of the year: Andy Cutting
- Best Original Song: Hollow Point - Chris Wood
- Horizon Award: Ewan McLennan
- Best Album: Gift – Eliza Carthy & Norma Waterson
- Lifetime achievement award: Donovan
- Best Live Act: Bellowhead
- Good Tradition Award: Fisherman's Friends
- Roots Award: Levellers

Venue: The Brewery, London

=== 2010 ===
- Folk Singer of the Year: Jon Boden
- Best Duo: Show of Hands
- Best Group: Lau
- Best Album: Hill of Thieves by Cara Dillon
- Best Original Song: Arrogance Ignorance and Greed by Steve Knightley (performed by Show of Hands)
- Best Traditional Track: Sir Patrick Spens by Martin Simpson
- Horizon Award: Sam Carter
- Musician of the Year: John Kirkpatrick
- Best Live Act: Bellowhead
- Lifetime Achievement Award: Nanci Griffith
- Lifetime Achievement Award: Dick Gaughan
- Folk Club Award: The Magpies Nest
- Good Tradition Award: Transatlantic Sessions

=== 2009 ===
- Folk Singer of the Year: Chris Wood
- Best Duo: Chris While and Julie Matthews
- Best Group: Lau
- Best Album: Trespasser by Chris Wood
- Best Original Song: All You Pretty Girls by Andy Partridge (performed by Jim Moray)
- Best Traditional Track: The Lark in the Morning by Jackie Oates
- Horizon Award: Jackie Oates
- Musician of the Year: Tom McConville
- Best Live Act: The Demon Barbers
- Lifetime Achievement Award: James Taylor
- Lifetime Achievement Award: Judy Collins
- Folk Club Award: Black Swan Folk Club, York

=== 2008 ===
- Folk Singer of the Year: Julie Fowlis
- Best Duo: John Tams and Barry Coope
- Best Group: Lau
- Best Album: Prodigal Son by Martin Simpson
- Best Original Song: Never Any Good by Martin Simpson
- Best Traditional Track: Cold Haily Rainy Night by The Imagined Village
- Horizon Award: Rachel Unthank and the Winterset
- Musician of the Year: Andy Cutting
- Best Live Act: Bellowhead
- Lifetime Achievement Award: John Martyn
- Good Tradition Award: Shirley Collins
- Folk Club Award: Dartford Folk Club

=== 2007 ===
- Folk Singer of the Year: Seth Lakeman
- Best Duo: Martin Carthy and Dave Swarbrick
- Best Group: Bellowhead
- Best Album: Freedom Fields by Seth Lakeman
- Best Original Song: Daisy by Karine Polwart
- Best Traditional Track: Barleycorn (performed by Tim van Eyken)
- Musician of the Year: Chris Thile
- Horizon Award: Kris Drever
- Best Live Act: Bellowhead
- Lifetime Achievement Award: Pentangle
- Lifetime Achievement Award: Danny Thompson
- Good Tradition Award: Nic Jones
- Folk Club Award: The Ram Club
- Favourite Folk Track Award (public vote): Who Knows Where The Time Goes (performed by Sandy Denny / Fairport Convention)

=== 2006 ===
- Folk Singer of the Year: John Tams
- Best Duo: John Spiers and Jon Boden
- Best Group: Flook
- Best Album: The Reckoning by John Tams
- Best Original Song: One In A Million by Chris Wood and Hugh Lupton
- Best Traditional Track: Bitter Withy (performed by John Tams)
- Horizon Award: Julie Fowlis
- Musician of the Year: Michael McGoldrick
- Lifetime Achievement Award: Paul Brady
- Lifetime Achievement Award: Richard Thompson
- Best Live Act: Kate Rusby
- Good Tradition Award: Ashley Hutchings
- Folk Club Award: Red Lion, Birmingham
- Most Influential Folk Album of All Time (public vote): Liege and Lief by Fairport Convention

=== 2005 ===
- Folk Singer of the Year: Martin Carthy
- Best Duo: Aly Bain and Phil Cunningham
- Best Group: Oysterband The Big Session
- Best Album: Faultlines by Karine Polwart
- Best Original Song: The Sun's Comin' Over The Hill by Karine Polwart
- Best Traditional Track: Famous Flower Of Serving Men (performed by Martin Carthy)
- Horizon Award: Karine Polwart
- Musician of the Year: Kathryn Tickell
- Lifetime Achievement Award: Ramblin' Jack Elliott
- Lifetime Achievement Award (Songwriting): Tom Paxton
- Best Live Act: Bellowhead
- Best Dance Band: Whapweasel
- Good Tradition Award: Steeleye Span
- Folk Club Award: Hitchin Folk Club

=== 2004 ===
- Folk Singer of the Year: June Tabor
- Best Duo: John Spiers and Jon Boden
- Best Group: Danú
- Best Album: Sweet England by Jim Moray
- Best Original Song: Co. Down by Tommy Sands (performed by Danú)
- Best Traditional Track: Hughie Graeme (performed by June Tabor)
- Horizon Award: Jim Moray
- Musician of the Year: Martin Simpson
- Lifetime Achievement Award: Dave Swarbrick
- Lifetime Achievement Award (Songwriting): Steve Earle
- Best Live Act: Show of Hands
- Good Tradition Award: Celtic Connections
- Folk Club Award: Rockingham Arms, Wentworth

=== 2003 ===
- Folk Singer of the Year: Eliza Carthy
- Best Duo: Nancy Kerr and James Fagan
- Best Group: Altan
- Best Album: Anglicana by Eliza Carthy
- Best Original Song: No Telling performed by Linda Thompson
- Best Traditional Track: Worcester City performed by Eliza Carthy
- Horizon Award: John Spiers and Jon Boden
- Instrumentalist of the Year: John McCusker
- Lifetime Achievement Award: Christy Moore
- Lifetime Achievement Award (Songwriting): John Prine
- Best Live Act: Roy Bailey and Tony Benn
- Good Tradition Award: Oysterband
- Folk Club Award: Edinburgh

=== 2002 ===
- Folk Singer of the Year: Martin Carthy
- Best Album: The Bramble Briar by Martin Simpson
- Best Original Song: Lullabye by Kate Rusby
- Best Traditional Track: Black Is the Color performed by Cara Dillon
- Best Group: Cherish the Ladies
- Horizon Award: Cara Dillon
- Instrumentalist of the Year: Martin Simpson
- Lifetime Achievement Award: The Chieftains
- Lifetime Achievement Award (Songwriting): Ralph McTell
- Lifetime Achievement Award: Fairport Convention
- Folk Club Award: Nettlebed
- Best Live Act: Rory McLeod

=== 2001 ===
- Folk Singer of the Year: Norma Waterson
- Best Album: Unity by John Tams
- Best Original Song: Harry Stone (Hearts of Coal) by John Tams
- Best Group: Danú
- Horizon Award: Bill Jones
- Instrumentalist of the Year: Michael McGoldrick
- Lifetime Achievement Award: Bert Jansch
- Radio 2 Special Roots Award: Taj Mahal
- Good Tradition Award: Bob Copper
- Folk Club Award: The Davy Lamp
- Best Live Act: Vin Garbutt

=== 2000 ===
- Folk Singer of the Year: Kate Rusby
- Best Album: Sleepless by Kate Rusby
- Best Original Song: A Place Called England by Maggie Holland
- Best Traditional Track: Raggle Taggle Gypsy performed by Waterson–Carthy
- Best Group: Waterson–Carthy
- Horizon Award: Nancy Kerr and James Fagan
- Instrumentalist of the Year: Martin Hayes
- Radio 2 Special Award: Joan Baez
- Radio 2 Special Roots Award: Youssou N'Dour
- Andy Kershaw Roots Award: Joe Boyd and Lucy Durán
- Good Tradition Award: Topic Records
- Folk Club Award: Westhoughton
- Best Live Act: La Bottine Souriante

== See also ==
- Scots Trad Music Awards
