= The Ram Folk Club =

Coordinates: 51.3823°N 0.3414°W

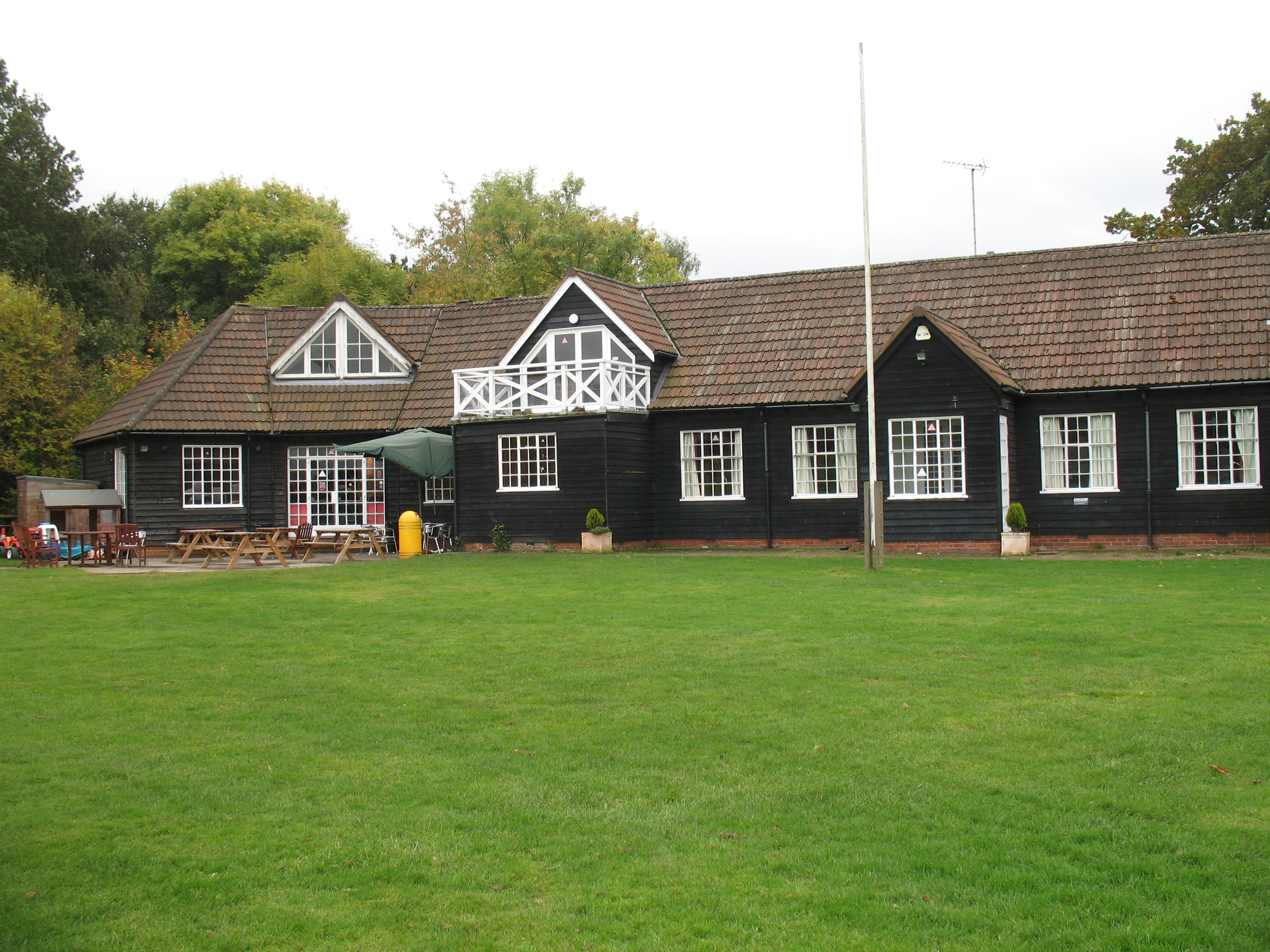
The Old Cranleighan Sports Club, the Ram Folk Club's final venue

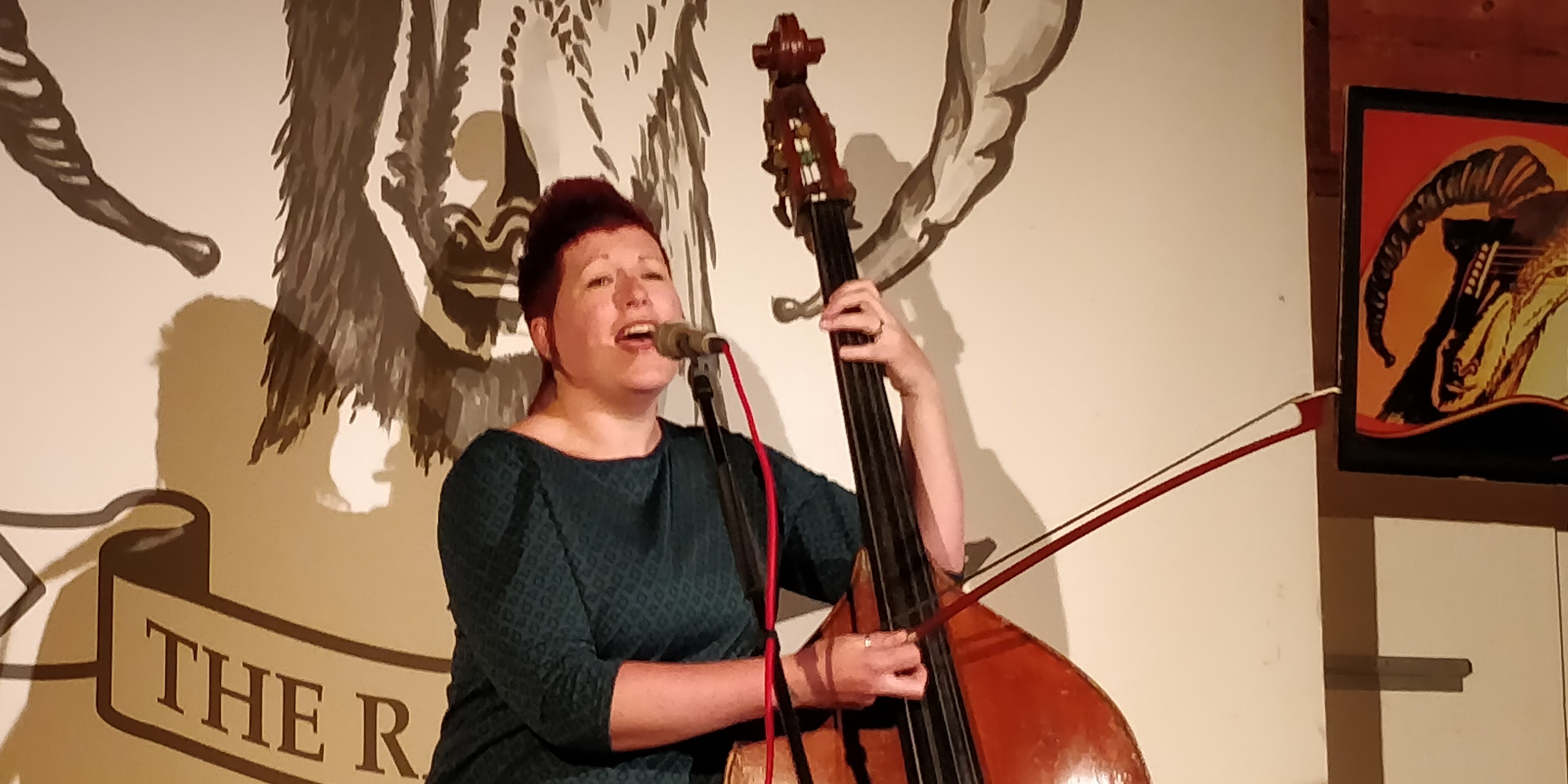
Miranda Sykes performing at the club on 26 April 2019

The Ram Folk Club was a folk club in the borough of Elmbridge in suburban north Surrey, one of only a few folk clubs in the Home Counties close to London. Established in October 1983, it operated on Friday evenings and featured music by folk and acoustic artists and bands. It was run by a small group of regular musicians and fans and was not for profit. The evening usually consisted of a main 'guest' preceded by several floor spots. In 2007, the club received the BBC Radio 2 Folk Club of the Year award. In March 2021, having not operated throughout the COVID-19 pandemic, it announced its permanent closure.

== Performances ==
The club had a wide variety of guests, from local bands to national or international musicians. They included Phil Beer, Archie Fisher, Martin Carthy and John Kirkpatrick.

== Venues ==
Originally known as the Greyhound Folk Club, the club's first events were held at a pub in Weston Green. The club moved in 1985 to a pub in Weybridge and became the Hand and Spear Folk Club. It took on The Ram Club name when it moved in 1987 to a Young's Brewery pub in Claygate.

From 2009 the Ram Folk Club held its folk music events at the Old Cranleighan Sports Club in Thames Ditton, midway between Kingston upon Thames, London and Walton on Thames. This was the club's fourth venue in Elmbridge and is only 0.5 miles (0.80 km) from the original venue in Weston Green.

In March 2021, having not operated throughout the COVID-19 pandemic, the club announced its permanent closure.
