= Proterra (album) =

Studio album by Runrig
- Released: 17 August 2003 (UK)
- Genre: Celtic rock
- Length: 56:01
- Label: Ridge
- Producer: Runrig, Paul Mounsey

Runrig chronology
The Stamping Ground (2001)	Proterra (2003)	Everything You See (2007)

Proterra is the twelfth album by the Scottish Celtic rock band Runrig, with Paul Mounsey.

== Track listing ==
1. "The Old Boys" - 5:16
2. "Proterra" - 5:35
3. "Day of Days" - 3:38
4. "Empty Glens" - 3:51
5. "Gabriel's Sword" - 4:57
6. "From the North" - 5:28
7. "An Toll Dubh" (The Dungeon) - 2:28
8. "There's a Need" - 3:34
9. "Faileas air an Àirigh" (Shadow on the Sheiling) - 4:06
10. "Heading to Acadia" - 4:16
11. "All the Miles" - 4:16
12. "A Rèiteach" (The Betrothal) - 5:19
13. "Angels from the Ashes" - 3:25

== Personnel ==
Runrig

- Iain Bayne - drums, percussion
- Bruce Guthro - lead vocals
- Brian Hurren - keyboards, vocals
- Malcolm Jones - guitars, accordion, vocals, pipes
- Calum Macdonald - percussion, vocals
- Rory Macdonald - vocals, bass guitar

== Singles ==
=== Empty Glens ===
"Empty Glens"

Single by Runrig

from the album Proterra
- B-side: "Running To The Light"
- Released: 2003
- Studio: Castlesound Studios, Edinburgh, Scotland
- Label: Ridge Records (UK); Columbia Records (Germany)
- Songwriter(s): C. Macdonald; R. Macdonald
- Producer(s): Calum Malcolm

Runrig singles chronology
"Wall of China" (2001)	"Empty Glens" (2003)	"Clash of the Ash" (2007)

"Empty Glens" is a 2003 single released, released as the lead and only single from Proterra (2003). It was released via Ridge Records in the United Kingdom and by Columbia Records in Germany, where it achieved moderate commercial success, debuting at number ninety-three on the German Singles Charts in August 2003. "Empty Glens" lyrically focuses on the transition away from churches and religion, and the reduced significance and role that religion has in the modern word. It notes that with the decline in religion and churches, the world appears to be moving "towards a more scientific world".

Ultimate Guitar reviewed "Empty Glens", citing it as one of the "good songs" on the Proterra album, alongside "Proterra" and "Day Of Days". The review further commented that "Empty Glens", together with "Proterra" and "Day of Days" are "all alive with the sound of Runrig".

Commercially, "Empty Glens" received moderate success in Germany, where it debuted at number ninety-three and stayed on the German Singles Charts for one week.

==== CD single (Europe) ====
1. "Empty Glens" (Radio Remix) – 3:31
2. "Empty Glens" (Album Version) – 3:49
3. "Running to the Light" (Radio Edit) – 3:26
4. "Wall of China" (Live Version) – 4:42

==== CD single (UK) ====
1. "Empty Glens" (Radio Remix) – 3:29
2. "The Old Boys" – 5:13
3. "Wall of China" (Live Version) – 4:41

==== CD single (Germany) ====
1. "Empty Glens" (Radio Remix) – 3:31
2. "Empty Glens" (Album Version) – 3:49
3. "Running to the Light" (Radio Edit) – 3:26
4. "Wall of China" (Live Version) – 4:42
