= Everything You See =

Studio album by Runrig
- Released: 14 May 2007 (UK)
- Recorded: Cromarty, Scotland, October 2006 – February 2007
- Genre: Celtic rock
- Length: 49:03
- Label: Ridge
- Producer: Runrig, Kristian Gislason

Runrig chronology
Proterra (2003)	Everything You See (2007)	The Story (2016)

Everything You See is the thirteenth album by the Scottish Celtic rock band Runrig, released by Ridge Records in the United Kingdom on 14 May 2007. All songs were written by band members Calum and Rory MacDonald, except for "Sona" and "And the Accordions Played", which they co-wrote with fellow band members Malcolm Jones and Brian Hurren, respectively. As on all Runrig albums, several songs are written and performed in Scottish Gaelic, underlining the band's heritage.

The album cover features shinty player Gary Innes wearing a Taynuilt Shinty Club strip about to strike the ball. The album features a song about shinty, "Clash of the Ash". Innes, who is a professional piano accordion player, joined the band on stage a number of times when they performed the song.

In Summer 2007, the band went on their Everything You See tour, promoting their newest album as well as older songs. The tour's main focus was Denmark (the track "In Scandinavia" commemorates the links between Denmark and Scotland), Germany, and England; originally only one concert was scheduled to be held in Scotland at Drumnadrochit by Loch Ness. The tour was later extended to include several Scottish dates. The Loch Ness concert, entitled Beat the Drum after the chorus to the song "Pride of the Summer", was released on DVD and CD as Year of the Flood in 2008.

== Track listing ==
1. "Year of the Flood" - 4:10
2. "Road Trip" - 4:24
3. "Clash of the Ash" - 3:16
4. "The Ocean Road" - 6:32
5. "Atoms" - 4:51
6. "An Dealachadh" (The Parting) - 3:08
7. "This Day" - 4:22
8. "Sona" (Joyful) - 4:55
9. "Something's Got to Give" - 3:21
10. "And the Accordions Played" - 4:58
11. "In Scandinavia" - 4:54

== Personnel ==
Runrig

- Iain Bayne - drums
- Bruce Guthro - lead vocals
- Brian Hurren - keyboards, vocals
- Malcolm Jones - guitars, bouzouki, pipes, accordion, mandolin
- Calum MacDonald - percussion
- Rory MacDonald - vocals, bass guitar, accordion
