= Benedict Morris =

Benedict Morris is a Scottish fiddler and musician from Glasgow, Scotland. He was introduced to traditional music at five years of age. A graduate of the Royal Conservatoire of Scotland, he won the BBC Radio Scotland Young Traditional Musician award in 2019.

He released his debut album, 'Wavelength', in autumn 2018 with guitarist Cormac Crummey. Its most-played track, Velocity, has 75k+ plays on Spotify as of October 2026.

In September 2021, he joined the folk band Talisk, replacing founding member Hayley Keenan two days after she announced her departure.
