= Bill Jones (musician) =

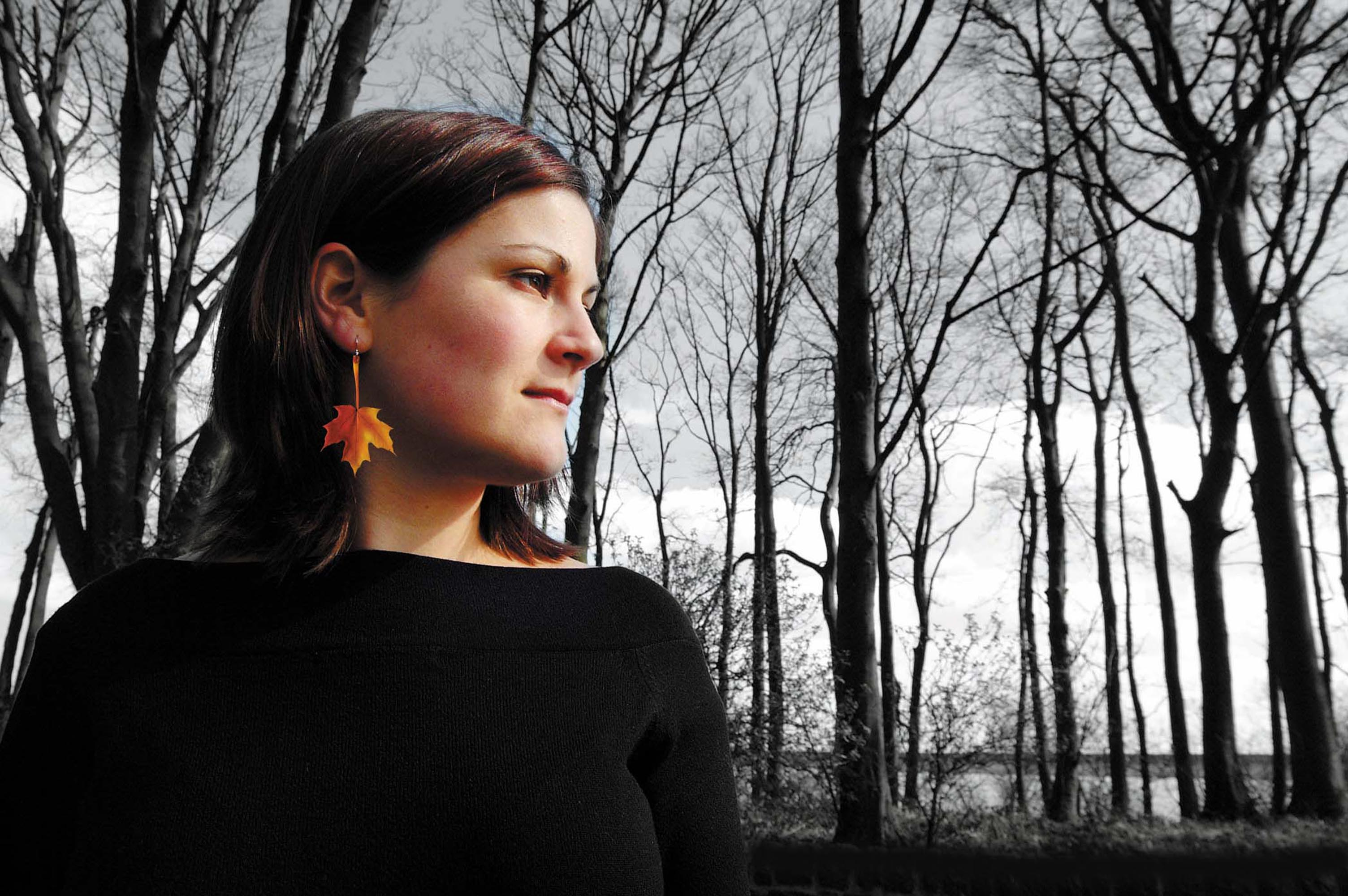
- Jones in 2003

Background information
- Also known as: Belinda Jones
- Origin: Staffordshire, England
- Genres: Folk
- Years active: 2000–present
- Labels: Brick Wall Music
- Website: https://www.brickwallmusic.com

Bill Jones (born Belinda Jones in Staffordshire, England) is an English folk singer/songwriter. Jones won the BBC Folk Award in 2001.

== Discography ==
- Turn to Me (Boing, 2000)
- Panchpuran (Brick Wall Music, 2001)
- Bits & Pieces EP (Brick Wall Music, 2001)
- Live at The Live (Brick Wall Music, 2002)
- Two Year Winter (Brick Wall Music, 2003)
- Wonderful Fairytale (Brick Wall Music, 2019)
