= Mohsen Amini =

Scottish concertinist

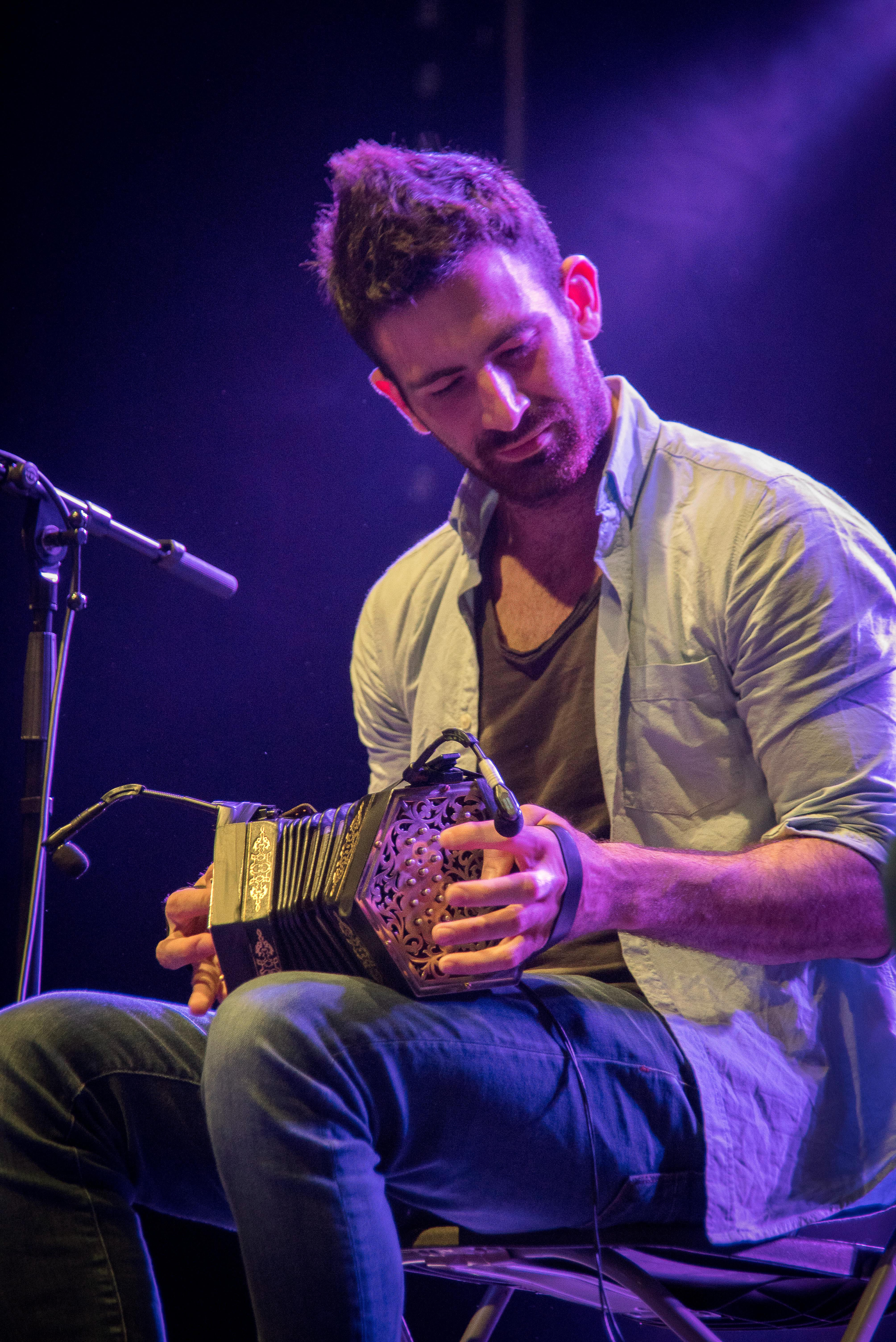
- Mohsen Amini at the Underneath the Stars festival in 2016

Background information
- Born: 1993 (age 32–33); Glasgow, Scotland
- Origin: Scotland
- Genre: Folk
- Instrument: Concertina
- Years active: c. 2003–present
- Website: mohsenamini.com

Mohsen Amini (born 1993) is a Scottish concertinist. He is a co-founder and member of the folk trio Talisk and the folk band Ímar.

== Early life ==
Amini was born in Glasgow, Scotland, to an English mother and an Iranian father.

He began playing the concertina when he was around 10 years old, and was tutored by the folk musicians Mairi Campbell and Catriona McArdle but largely taught himself. He attended Strathclyde University to study chemical engineering but dropped out to pursue his musical career.

== Career ==
Amini co-founded Talisk in 2014 and Ímar in 2016. He plays a 120-year-old concertina that cost £7,000.

In 2016, he won the BBC Radio Scotland's Young Traditional Musician award, the first concertinist to do so. At the 2018 BBC Radio 2 Folk Awards, he was named Musician of the Year, the youngest ever holder of the title.

A profile in The Herald described Amini as a "young international virtuoso of the concertina". An interview with Spiral Earth described Amini as "a flamboyant force of nature and a natural showman – with eye defying, quick-fire concertina skills and a never failing bonhomie." He told The Economist that he experiments with technology like multi-sample pads and expression pedals in his spare time.
