= Gary Innes =

Scottish musician and shinty player

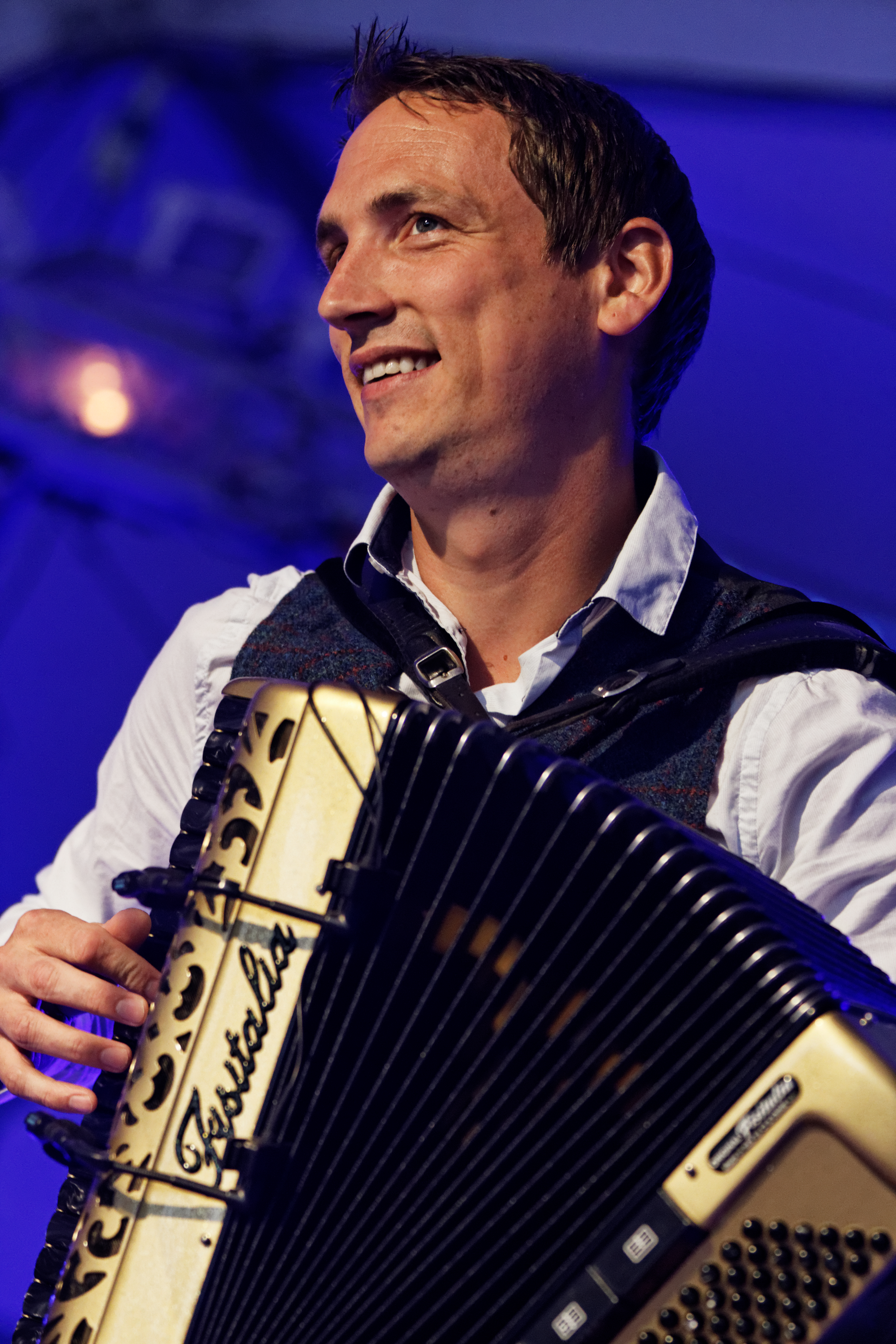
- Innes with Mànran in Quimper, France in 2013

Background information
- Born: 13 December 1980 (age 45)
- Origin: Spean Bridge, Inverness-shire, Scotland
- Genres: Folk; folk-rock; Gaelic; Scottish folk
- Occupations: Musician; shinty player; broadcaster; first responder; firefighter
- Instrument: Piano accordion
- Years active: 2003–present
- Member of: Mànran
- Spouse: Hannah Matheson (m. 2017)

Gary Innes (born 13 December 1980) is a Scottish musician, shinty player, composer and broadcaster. He is a founding member of Scottish folk-rock band Mànran.

== Music ==
Innes has had a professional career playing the piano accordion since 2003, and is noted for his distinctive purple accordion.

He joined Runrig on stage at their concert Beat the Drum in Drumnadrochit on 18 August 2007 where he played to an audience of 17,500 and continued to join the band on Clash of the Ash at many of their open air shows. This included joining Runrig for their farewell concerts at Stirling Castle on 17 and 18 August 2018 to over 50,000 people.

In 2010, Innes formed Mànran who aimed to become the first band since Capercaillie to enter a Scottish Gaelic song into the UK Top 40 when they released their first single, "Latha Math" on 17 January 2011. With a midweek high of no. 29 it fell short, finishing the week in 61st place, however they managed no. 1 in the UK singer/songwriter charts, no. 6 in the Scottish charts, and no. 6 in the Radio 1 indie charts.

Together with Mànran and Pop Idol winner Michelle McManus, Innes created the official 2012 STV Children's Appeal charity single "Take You There" and performed it live on the show. The appeal raised two million pounds for under-privileged children in Scotland.

Innes was musical director of the BBC ALBA Hogmanay show in 2011, 2012, 2013, 2014.

In 2015 Innes created Scotland's first collaborative charity folk single with a piece of music he composed called "Our Heroes". This commemorated the centenary of the Battle of Festubert and included a performance on the set of bagpipes that were being played by Lance Corporal Donald Patterson when he fell in battle on 18 May 1915, 100 years to the day. All proceeds were donated to Scotland's veterans charity Erskine.

Innes was awarded "Instrumentalist of the Year" at the 2017 MG Alba Scots Trad Music Awards.

== Shinty ==
Innes started playing shinty at a young age, playing for Kilmonivaig Primary and then local side Lochaber. When their youth team folded, he moved to Fort William Shinty Club, where he developed into one of the leading players of the 2000s. He usually played at wing centre and wing forward in his formative years.

He was captain and man of the match for their famous victory in the 2005 Camanachd Cup final over local rivals Kilmallie and part of the team in the club's historic league championship in 2006.

He has also featured for fourteen years in the Composite Rules Shinty/Hurling International for Scotland. For the 2009/10 Shinty/Hurling International, Innes was named captain of the Scotland team. Ireland's All Star Tommy Walsh broke Innes's nose in the opening minutes of the 2010 International at Croke Park however Innes continued and scored 7 points for Scotland eventually beating the Irish 22–21.

He has reached iconic status in the game of shinty, an image of him playing the sport being used by Runrig on the cover of their 2007 album, Everything You See.

Innes wore his No. 9 Scotland captain's jersey on stage during Runrig's final two concerts at Stirling Castle in 2018 and then auctioned off the signed strip to raise money for youth development within the sport. The shirt sold for £4591.

In 2010 Innes was named Marine Harvest and National "Player of the Year" and for his shinty and musical talent was invited to the Queen's garden party at Holyrood.

Transworld Sport filmed a programme on Innes which was broadcast in 2010.

Innes double career as a high-profile shinty player and musician has resulted in a lot of attention. In March 2009 Innes claimed that he knew a rival team had deliberately targeted him for injury due to his musical prowess.

On 15 May 2010 in a game against Premier Division strugglers GMA, Innes scored 9 goals in a 14–0 victory. Innes claimed he was denied a record 10 by the referee didn't notice the ball returning out of the goal after hitting the back stanchion. This would have given him the record for most goals scored in one single game.

On 18 September 2010, Innes scored 2 out of 3 Fort's goals against Kingussie in the 103rd Camanachd Cup final at Bught Park in Inverness. The win against Kingussie put the team's name on the trophy for the 4th year running. Innes's performance also claimed the Albert Smith Medal for the second time, having previously won it in 2005.

Innes retired on a high at the end of the 2014 season, restoring Fort William to the Premier Division and earning his final cap for Scotland. This was due to increased musical commitments.

On 30 March 2019, Innes was named by the Camanachd Association as their first ever ambassador of The Camanachd Cup.

In June 2022, Innes returned to play for the newly formed Cruachanside.

== Broadcasting ==
From the start of the 2010 season, Innes wrote a weekly blog for bbc.co.uk and when he is not himself playing, he is often involved in summarising for the BBC in front of camera or from the commentary box.

In 2014 BBC ALBA filmed Innes and Mànran for a one-hour documentary as the band toured across Australia, America and the UK.

On 24 September 2016 Innes took over from Robbie Shepherd as presenter of Take the Floor. Since 5 April 2020 Innes has also presented a Sunday show on BBC Radio Scotland called Take the Floor - Your Requests later renamed to Your Requests with Gary Innes.

Innes alongside BBC Radio Scotland presenter Bryan Burnett co-hosted BBC Radio Scotland's 40th anniversary celebrations for radio and television from the Glasgow Barrowland Ballroom on 4 November 2018.

== Events ==
Alongside his music and broadcasting career, Innes founded An Aird Events, a Scottish events company specialising in the promotion of live music and cultural events centred on Scottish traditional music. Through the company, he launched Hoolie in the Hydro in 2022, an arena concert celebrating Scottish traditional music at Glasgow's OVO Hydro. The Sunday Post described the inaugural concert as the first event promoted by an individual in a UK arena dedicated entirely to traditional music. Innes has discussed his hopes that it would “pave the way” for traditional music on larger stages. Following the success of the inaugural year, Hoolie in the Hydro became an annual event. The 2023 concert paid tribute to the Scottish band Runrig to mark the band's 50^{th} anniversary, with ticket sales surpassing those of the inaugural year. The 2024 edition celebrated 100 years of Scottish music, bringing together a line-up of artists whose combined milestone anniversaries totalled a century. In 2025, the concert returned for its fourth iteration which featured a tribute to the life and legacy of Scottish comedian Sir Billy Connolly. The event is scheduled to return to the OVO Hydro for its fifth edition in December 2026.

Building on the success of Hoolie in the Hydro, An Aird Events expanded internationally in April 2025, with Scotland's Hoolie in New York, presented at Carnegie Hall during NYC Tartan Week. Hosted by Alan Cumming, the concert featured performances from leading Scottish artists including Mànran, Julie Fowlis and Dougie MacLean, alongside performers from the Royal Edinburgh Military Tattoo and the Oban High School Pipe Band. The event also featured an appearance of the historic Gregg fiddle, an 18^{th}-century instrument closely associated with Scottish poet Robert Burns and believed to have been played by his dancing master William Gregg. Its appearance formed part of a partnership with the National Trust for Scotland.

In addition to the Hoolie concerts, An Aird Events revived the Lochaber Live festival in Fort William in 2024, after a hiatus of approximately 30 years. Speaking about the festival's return, Innes said he hoped to restore his hometown festival “to its former glory” and reflect Scotland's thriving traditional music scene.

Innes won ‘Industry Person of the Year’ at the MG Alba Scots Trad Music Awards in 2024.

== Personal life ==
Innes was a part-time fire-fighter in the Scottish Fire & Rescue Service in Spean Bridge from 1999 to 2015 and a First Responder from 2007 to 2016.

On 8 April 2017, Innes married Hannah Matheson, niece of Karen Matheson of Capercaillie, in a marquee on the Taynuilt shinty field. They have two daughters.

== Discography ==
- How's the Craic? (2005)
- Era (2017)
- Imminent (2019)

With Box Club

- Box Club (2008)

With Ewan Robertson

- Shouts (2009)

With Mànran

- Latha Math (2011)
- Mànran (2011)
- The Test (2013)
- An Dà Là - The Two Days (2017)
- When You Go (2018)
- ÙRAR (2021)
- To the Wind (2025)
