= The Full English (folk music archive) =

Digital archive of English folk song

The Full English launched in 2013 and is an ongoing English Folk Dance and Song Society (EFDSS) project to create a searchable digital archive of English folk song collections from the early 20th century, thereby preserving and improving the accessibility of these resources. The project is supported by the Heritage Lottery Fund, The Folklore Society, the National Folk Music Fund and the English Miscellany Folk Dance Group. An offshoot of the archive, also in 2013, was an album and concert tour under The Full English name by a collective of UK folk singers.

== Archive ==
Launched in June 2013, The Full English is a folk archive of 44,000 records and over 58,000 digitised images; it is the world's biggest digital archive of traditional music and dance tunes. The archive brings together 19 collections from noted archivists, including Lucy Broadwood, Percy Grainger, Cecil Sharp and Ralph Vaughan Williams.

The project has been divided into two parts. The first part of the project involved making manuscript collections available to the public in a searchable online database. The second part, still ongoing, is to improve accessibility by supplying transcripts of musical notation and texts, as well as audio recordings of the tunes. The archive can be searched by various criteria including title, collector, subject, original singer or location they were collected from.

It is estimated the project overall will involve around 15,000 people by the time it is completed, including children learning traditional folk songs and dances and audiences at live gigs.

== Musical collaboration ==
Folk singer and scholar Fay Hield was commissioned by the EFDSS to create new musical arrangements, drawing on the archive material, to accompany the project. She assembled a collective of musicians to perform at the launch party in June 2013, but after creating a set the musicians decided to extend the collaboration by producing an album and touring under The Full English name in order to promote the archive. The tour visited 11 English towns and cities in autumn 2013. Alongside Hield, other musicians involved included Seth Lakeman, Martin Simpson, Nancy Kerr, Sam Sweeney, Rob Harbron and Ben Nicholls.

On the tour, The Full English group performed folk songs from the archive and other traditional sources. They subsequently won two awards at the 2014 BBC Radio 2 Folk Awards for best group and best album.
