= Craig Irving =

Scottish guitarist and singer

Craig Irving is a Scottish musician from Inverness, Scotland.

He was formerly a guitarist and singer with Gaelic folk band Mànran and formerly of BBC Radio 2 Folk Award-winning trio, Talisk.

== Background ==
Irving began playing the guitar at the age of 15 whilst living in Australia.

Upon his return to Scotland, he studied music at Lews Castle College in Benbecula in 2012 and at the Royal Conservatoire of Scotland in Glasgow from 2013 to 2016, though was forced to leave before the completion of his studies due to touring commitments with Mànran.

== Music ==
In August 2014, Irving formed the trio, Talisk, alongside concertina player Mohsen Amini and fiddler Hayley Keenan. A few months later, the group won the 2015 BBC Radio 2 Young Folk Award, and a Celtic Connections Danny Kyle Award. The group were then nominated for Up and Coming Artist of the Year at the 2015 Scots Trad Music Awards. The group's debut album, Abyss, also received a nomination for Album of the Year at the 2016 Scots Trad Music Awards.

He joined Gaelic folk rock band, Mànran, in February 2016 and has performed with the group throughout the world, including notable tours and performances in Australia, Denmark, Spain, Germany, Belgium, Ireland and Switzerland. The group released their third studio album in January 2017.

== Discography ==
With Talisk

- 2015 Pinnacle 67 EP
- 2016 Abyss

With Mànran

- 2017 An Dà Là/The Two Days
