= Baby Loves Disco =

Nightclub business for children

Baby Loves Disco was a business, the purpose of which was to connect children and their parents with other children and parents in a nightclub environment. The dance parties featuring music spun and mixed by real disk jockeys blending classic disco tunes.

== History ==
Baby Loves Disco was created in Philadelphia by professional dancer and mother Heather Murphy. All events are held in a nightclub during the afternoon hours and include a disc jockey, emcee, classic disco and 80's tunes, a full spread of healthy snacks, a chill-out zone with books and toys, and a vast menu of other "extras" such as face painting, balloons, bubbles, mommy massages, and more. The community aspect of the event is a focus, and local businesses in each location are involved as sponsors, contributing to the atmosphere of the party by providing samples and activities. “The idea was to create an alternative to the pre-packaged world of entertainment for young kids.” Ropeadope Records founder and father of three, Andy Hurwitz, soon took notice and joined forces with Heather to help spread the Baby Loves Disco event across the United States.

By the fall of 2006 Baby Loves Disco had spread coast to coast and now takes place in over 21 cities – all without any traditional advertising, marketing or publicity as word of mouth spread through the parental grapevine quickly. The events spread to roughly three dozen major United States cities, including Atlanta, metro New York City, Chicago, Boston, Washington, D.C., greater Los Angeles, and Houston. International events were held in Australia, Japan, Hong Kong, Poland, the United Kingdom and Dubai. New Zealand has been running them since 2010.

The event gained press coverage, including a segment on ABC's Nightline.

Baby Loves Disco was featured on season 4 episode 9 of Shark Tank. They were not offered any deals.

== Changes ==
As of December 2009, Baby Loves Disco has announced a change in the structure of the events, in the form of a National Tour in 2010. This tour will hit 45 cities across the United States, setting up mobile dance parties in nightclubs, hospitals, preschools and open spaces. The tour will benefit the national children's charity, Project Sunshine.

Baby Loves Disco partnered with retailer H&M to present their "Super Heroes Tour," featuring kids in costume. Twelve of the 2011 family dance parties took place at Loews Hotels locations around the United States.

The Baby Loves disco Facebook page has had no activity from the company since May of 2016. As of April of 2017, the website babylovesdisco.com was no longer active.
