= Worbey & Farrell =

British musical comedy duo

Worbey & Farrell, previously known as Katzenjammer, are a British piano musical comedy duo comprising Steven Worbey and Kevin Farrell. The word Katzenjammer is German, meaning "discordant sound" and is also sometimes used to indicate a general state of depression or bewilderment. It's sometimes used in reference to a hangover. The literal translation is "cat's wail". The duo changed its name in February 2011 to Worbey & Farrell.

Worbey and Farrell are a four hands, one piano cabaret act that have performed throughout the UK and Europe in hundreds of theatres and festivals. They have appeared numerous times on television in the UK, Portugal, Germany and Austria. They are regulars on BBC Radio, in particular BBC Radio 3. Their 2015 show Worbey and Farrell's House Party at the Assembly Rooms, Edinburgh was named amongst the top ten shows to see by Time Out (out of 3,300 shows at the Edinburgh Festival). They were one of the few headline acts to perform on the maiden voyages of all three Cunard liners – Queen Mary 2, Queen Elizabeth and Queen Victoria. Worbey and Farrell are Steinway Artists.

Their shows feature a wide range of music presented in a comedic manner and include a TV screen where the audience can see the choreography of their hands and their technical showmanship. Their original arrangements cover a myriad of styles including classical, jazz, boogie woogie, pop, rap and showtunes. Some of their comedic routines have been compared to the likes of Victor Borge.

== History ==
The pair met whilst studying at the Royal College of Music. Although pursuing separate careers, they met regularly to rehearse for a year and the act came together, fusing their personalities and skills. As Steven reflects, "It just clicked – the humour, the synchronisation, the improvised sense of fun. We discovered that we played the piano together in a way that had never been played before. We spend months on each arrangement, contorting ourselves into odd positions to create orchestral sounds from the piano. We like to think of the piano as our very own orchestra".

"Katzenjammer" was conceived in Summer 2003 over several bottles of Chardonnay by Royal College of Music graduates Worbey and Farrell. Their unique performance twist of both playing the same piano at the same time was, in part, due to the simple financial constraints of student life. The luxury of two pianos (and even two piano stools) being beyond their means.

Their first gig was at The Royal Opera House in Covent Garden, which led to a flood of offers across the world.

Their mix of comedy and musical virtuosity has made them a global hit and gained them a dedicated following. From Papua, New Guinea to Berwick upon Tweed (literally on consecutive nights) they have performed in over 120 countries. They were once flown to Chicago to perform with Mickey Rooney for his 89th birthday concert, "That was a bizarre and wonderful weekend", says Worbey. "It was such an honour performing with a legend".

The duo have played the Royal Opera House, the Royal Festival Hall and Blackpool Grand Theatre and also appear regularly on Queen Elizabeth 2 and Queen Mary 2. They have also appeared five times to critical acclaim at the world-famous Edinburgh Festival Fringe.

== Performance style ==
The Katzenjammer act has been compared to Victor Borge, as the pair often use their own comic compositions as well as parody a wide range of musical styles from The Spice Girls to ragtime. A key part of their live show is a projected close-up image of the piano keyboard so the audience can see the tangle of hands and arms during their performance.

== Individual biographies ==
=== Kevin Farrell ===
After graduating from the Royal College of Music in 1992, Farrell went on to work on the Emmy award winning show Concerto with Dudley Moore. He toured with the English National Ballet and was then commissioned to write the music for the Jiving Lindy Hoppers' jazz ballet, Jungles of the Cities. As a composer he has written a children's ballet The Water Babies and the music for the notorious play The Dead Monkey starring David Soul. He has also written music for over 80 documentaries and 4 feature films including Death of a Son starring Lynn Redgrave and Never Play with the Dead. He has regularly appeared on Liberty Radio, LBC radio and BBC London.

=== Steven Worbey ===
Worbey studied piano performance at the Royal College of Music between 1990 and 1995 with Phyllis Sellick and Yonty Solomon. During this time he won a scholarship to study at Post-graduate level with the pianist Peter Katin (with whom he performed in a series of piano duet concerts at the Fairfield Halls, Croydon). Since graduating, Steven toured extensively throughout the UK giving piano recitals and chamber music concerts. Having always been interested in theatre, Steven has appeared in various theatre and television roles, including When Pigs Fly (Arts Theatre) and You Couldn't Make it Up (2002 Edinburgh Festival Fringe). He is also the voice of Pod in the children's cartoon Pod's Mission for the BBC.

== Repertoire ==
Composer	Work (all arrangements by Worbey & Farrell)	Notes & References
Richard Addinsell	Warsaw Concerto (1941), Arr. for 4 hands, 1 piano	
Malcolm Arnold	Concerto for Two Pianos (Three Hands) (1969), Arr. for 4 hands, 1 piano	
Johann Sebastian Bach / Charles Gounod	Ave Maria (Bach/Gounod) (1853), Arr. for 4 hands, 1 piano	
Johann Sebastian Bach	Toccata and Fugue in D minor (c. 1740s), Transcription for 4 hands, 1 piano	
Ludwig van Beethoven	Bagatelle No. 25 in A minor (Für Elise) (1810), Arr. for 4 hands, 1 piano	
Edward Elgar	Pomp and Circumstance March No. 1 (1901), Arr. for 4 hands, 1 piano	
George Gershwin	Rhapsody in Blue (1924), Arr. for 4 hands, 1 piano	
Aram Khachaturian	Sabre Dance (1942), Arr. for 4 hands, 1 piano	
Niccolò Paganini	Deviations on a Caprice, (based on Variations) Arr. for 4 hands, 1 piano	
Astor Piazzolla	Libertango (1974), Arr. for 4 hands, 1 piano	
Sergei Prokofiev	Peter and the Wolf (1936), Arr. for 4 hands, 1 piano	
Queen	Bohemian Rhapsody (1975), Arr. for 4 hands, 1 piano	
Camille Saint-Saëns	The Carnival of the Animals (1886), Arr. for 4 hands	
Pyotr Ilyich Tchaikovsky	1812 Overture (1880), Arr. for 4 hands, 1 piano	
Charles-Marie Widor	Toccata from Symphony for Organ No. 5 (1879), Arr. for 4 hands, 1 piano	

== Trivia ==
- Farrell & Worbey have a pet dog named Margaret, who featured in a silent-movie parody called Margaret come home shown during some of their theatre performances in 2006.
