= Talisk =

Scottish folk band

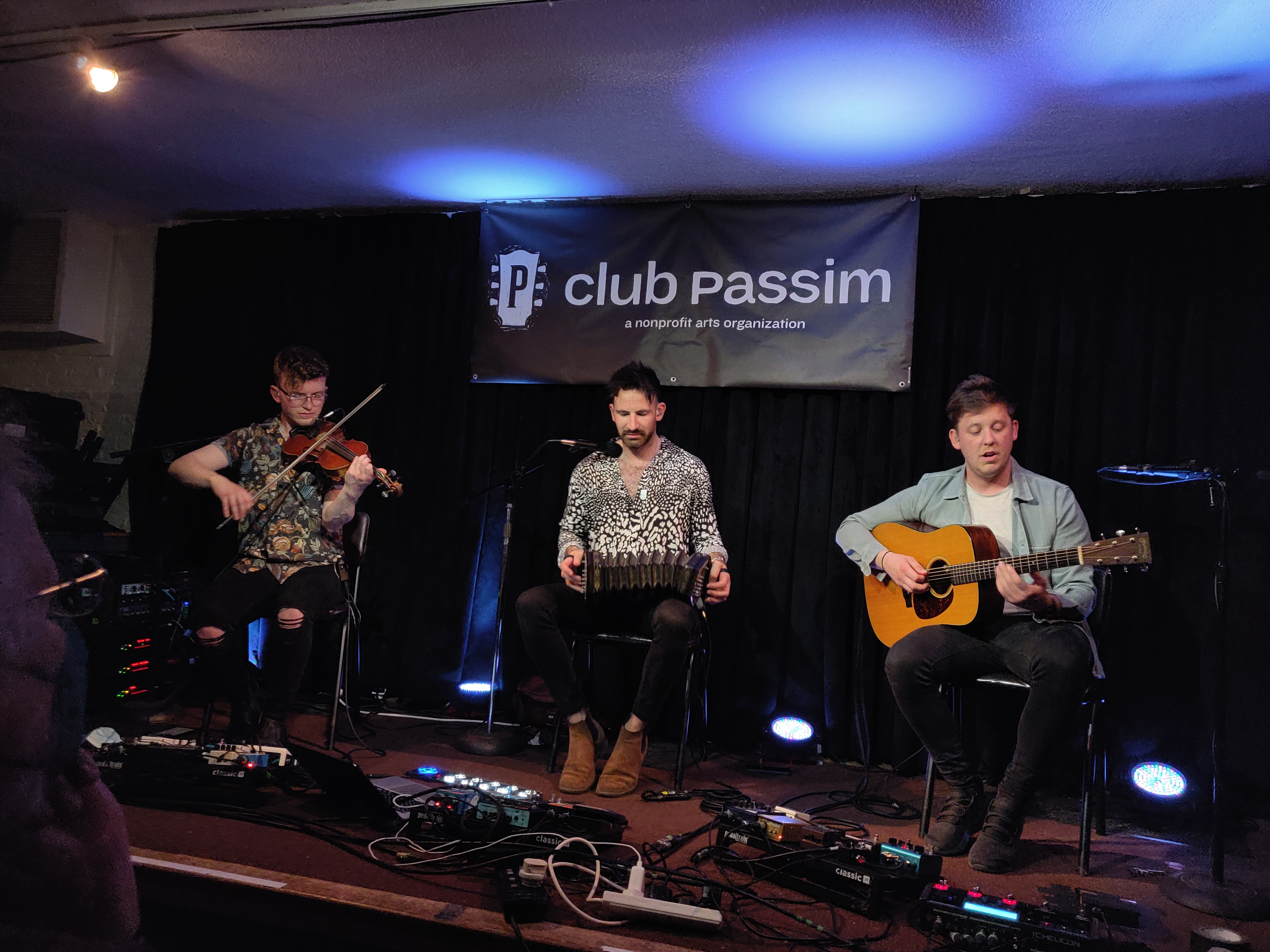
- Talisk performing in 2022

Background information
- Origin: Glasgow, Scotland
- Genres: Celtic music, Scottish folk music
- Years active: 2015–present
- Label: Talisk Records
- Members: Mohsen Amini; Benedict Morris; Charlie Galloway
- Past members: Craig Irving; Hayley Keenan; Graeme Armstrong
- Website: www.talisk.co.uk

Talisk are a Scottish folk band composed of Mohsen Amini, Benedict Morris, and Charlie Galloway. The band rose to prominence after winning the 2015 BBC Radio 2 Young Folk Award and the MG Alba Scots Trad Music Awards "Folk Band of the Year" category in 2017.

== History ==
Logo

Talisk were formed in 2015 with Mohsen Amini, Hayley Keenan, and Craig Irving. Irving left to join Mànran, and was replaced on the guitar by Graeme Armstrong. That year the band won the BBC Radio 2 Young Folk Award. Following this Amini became the 2016 BBC Radio Scotland Young Traditional Musician. The success of the band continued to grow into 2017 where they were awarded "Folk Band of the Year" at the MG Alba Scots Trad Music Awards. Amini then followed to be named the 2018 "Musician of the Year" at the BBC Radio 2 Folk Awards. Their debut album, Abyss, was released in 2016, and their second album, Beyond, was released in 2018. That same year, they received the Belhaven Bursary for Innovation in Scottish Music, the largest music prize in Scotland.

In September 2021, Hayley Keenan announced her departure from Talisk to return to classroom music education. She was replaced two days later by fiddler Benedict Morris, who was BBC Radio Scotland Young Traditional Musician in 2019. In November 2023, Armstrong left and was replaced by Charlie Galloway.

== Musical style ==
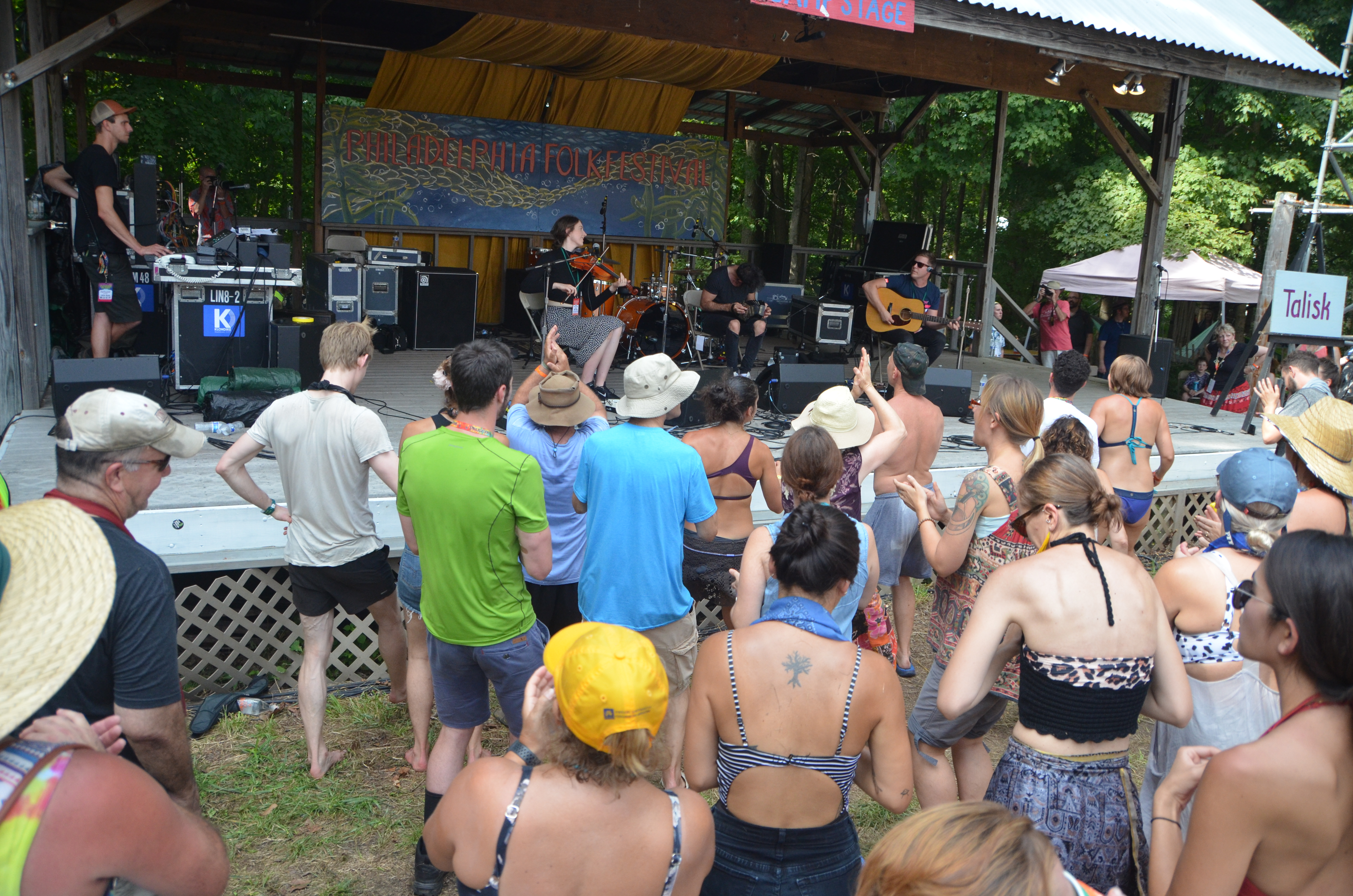
Talisk at the 2019 Philadelphia Folk Festival

Neil McFadyen of Folk Radio UK described their music in a review as having a "driving, fiery" sound. "It's hard to think of [another] band that has achieved so much and made such an impact on the trad music scene in their first three years," he wrote. "They just keep piling the energy into the music, and it's energy that sweeps their audience right along with them."

A 2015 article on the same site by Johnny Whalley noted that "their music draws on the Irish as well as the Scottish tradition and generally cracks along at a lively pace with concertina and fiddle vying for the lead, driven by Craig's guitar. The musicianship is phenomenal, the enthusiasm infectious and guaranteed to put a smile on your face."

Talisk are a purely instrumental band. Rob Adams of the Herald Scotland noted in a review that "in the absence of songs to vary the mood and tempo, they employ passages of reflection and trance-like motifs or offer a quiet melodic introduction."

== Band members ==
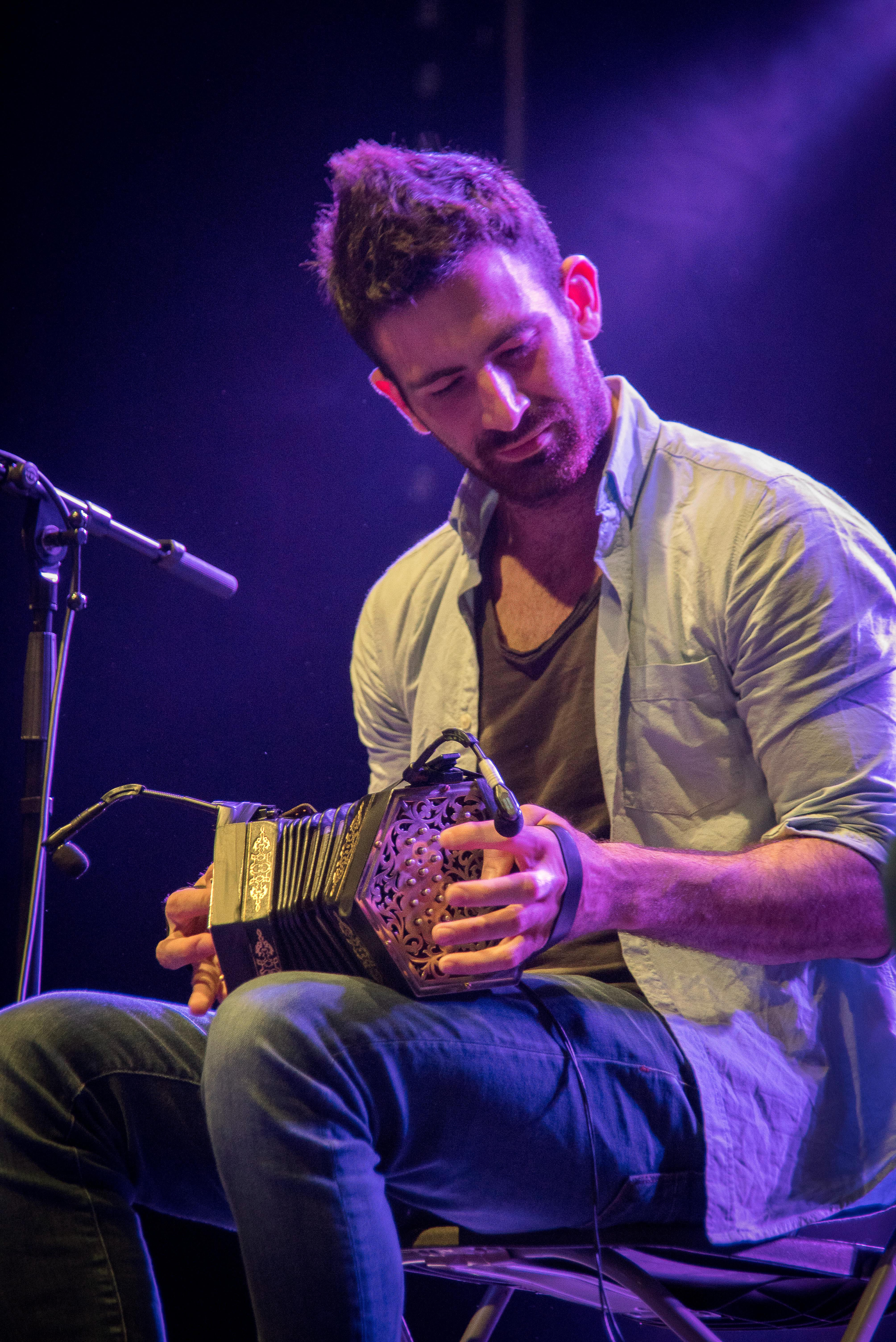
Concertinist Amini at the Underneath the Stars festival in 2016

=== Present ===
- Mohsen Amini – Concertina
- Benedict Morris – Fiddle
- Charlie Galloway – Guitar

=== Past ===
- Hayley Keenan – Fiddle
- Craig Irving – Guitar
- Graeme Armstrong – Guitar

== Discography ==
=== Albums ===
- Abyss (2016)
- Beyond (2018)
- Dawn (2022)
- stems from this (2026)

=== Live Albums ===
- Live at the Barrowlands (2024)

=== Singles ===
- Aura (2021)
- Echo 22 (2022)
- Dystopia, Pt. 2 (2022)
- Maverick (2024)
- Yellowstone (2025)
- Ember (2025)
- Venom (2025)

=== Compilations ===
- BBC Radio 2 Folk Awards 2015 (2015)
- The Mark Radcliffe Folk Sessions (2015)
- BBC Radio 2 Folk Awards 2017 (2017)
- Celtic Colours Live, Vol.5 (2017)
- The Rough Guide to Scottish Folk (2018)
