= Jamie Smith's Mabon =

Welsh folk band

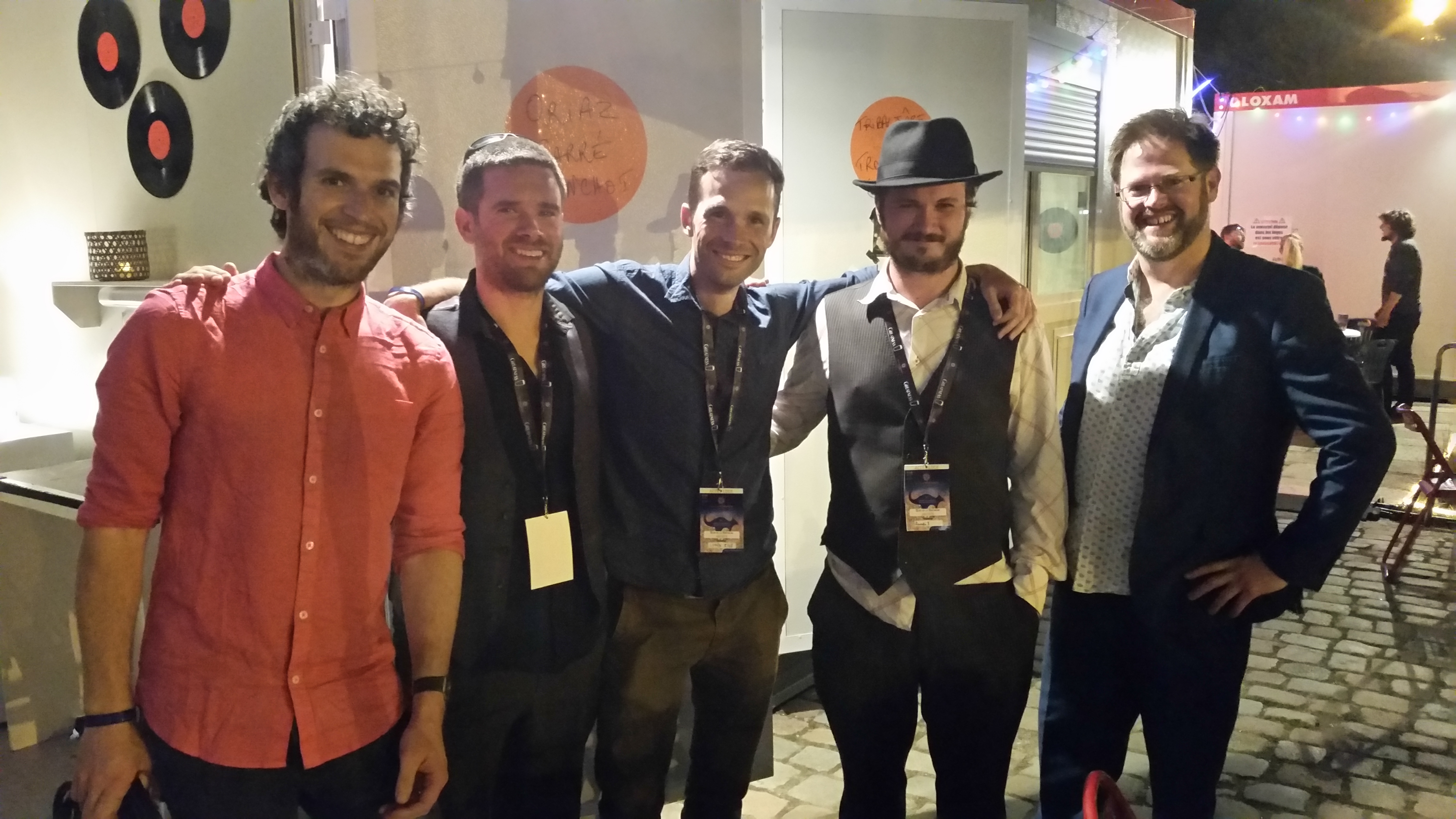
- Jamie Smith's Mabon in 2016

Background information
- Origin: Wales
- Genres: Folk music, Folk rock, Indie folk
- Years active: 1998–2020
- Members: Jamie Smith – accordion and voice Oli Wilson-Dickson – fiddle Paul Rogers – guitar Matt Downer – bass Iolo Whelan – drums and percussion
- Past members: Tom Callister; Callum Stewart; Adam Rhodes; Dylan Fowler; Will Lang
- Website: https://www.jamiesmithsmabon.com/

Jamie Smith's Mabon were a Welsh folk band renowned for their live performances and their seven albums released between 2001 and 2018. Founded in 1998, the band disbanded in 2020.

== History ==
Founded as 'Mabon' in 1998, the group initially predominantly played Welsh folk tunes, but they soon emerged to develop a more contemporary sound, calling on wide-ranging influences reaching far beyond the traditional canon. Starting with Lumps of Mabon in 2001, the group released four albums as 'Mabon' before re-branding as 'Jamie Smith's Mabon' in 2011. After the next two albums, Windblown (2012) and The Space Between (2015), with winning the 'Best Group' in the 2014 Spiral Earth Awards and the 2015 Eiserner Eversteiner Award in between, the group marked their 20th anniversary in 2019 with a live album and a worldwide tour.

Renowned for their live performances, Jamie Smith's Mabon took on many world tours and performed well over 1,000 gigs in four continents by 2018 alone. Notable festivals the group have performed at include: Festival Interceltique de Lorient (2010, 2012, 2013, 2014, 2016, 2018); Celtic Connections (2011, 2015, 2019); the Rain Forest World Music Festival in Borneo (being the first Welsh band to perform here); WOMAD UK (2011 and 2017); WOMAD Australia (2019); WOMAD New Zealand; Musicport Festival (2017); Cambridge Folk Festival (2013 and 2017); Sidmouth Folkweek (2017); National Eisteddfod of Wales (2019); Fairport's Cropredy Convention (2011) and Cwlwm Celtaidd (2016).

Musicians who have recorded, performed or collaborated with Jamie Smith's Mabon include: Tomas Callister, Callum Stewart, Adam Rhodes, Dylan Fowler, Will Lang

The group announced their amicable disbanding with a farewell tour for autumn 2020. Although the final date of the tour was planned to be in June 2020, coronavirus cut the tour months short.

== Musical style ==
Jamie Smith's Mabon predominantly performed purely instrumental music, although they also had many songs with vocals. Nearly all of their music was their own composition, predominantly created by Jamie Smith and reflecting their varied interests and influences based in traditional or contemporary Celtic music, but also reaching into world music and beyond. Their ability to seamlessly blur "the boundaries between the heritage of a traditional Celtic legacy and a more contemporary sound" has been noted, as has their "wide dynamic range, from quiet, reflective melodies and songs to loud and exciting music." Amongst the latter are tunes such as "The Accordionist's Despair", an incredibly difficult piece, described as "... an unholy union of Bach and Metallica."

At the time of the release of Windblown in 2017, folk radio said, "One of the attractions of Mabon’s music is its untethered nature: traditionally inspired but all original. Rather than create boundaries and confines to work within they also take influences from other folk traditions and beyond."

== Band members ==
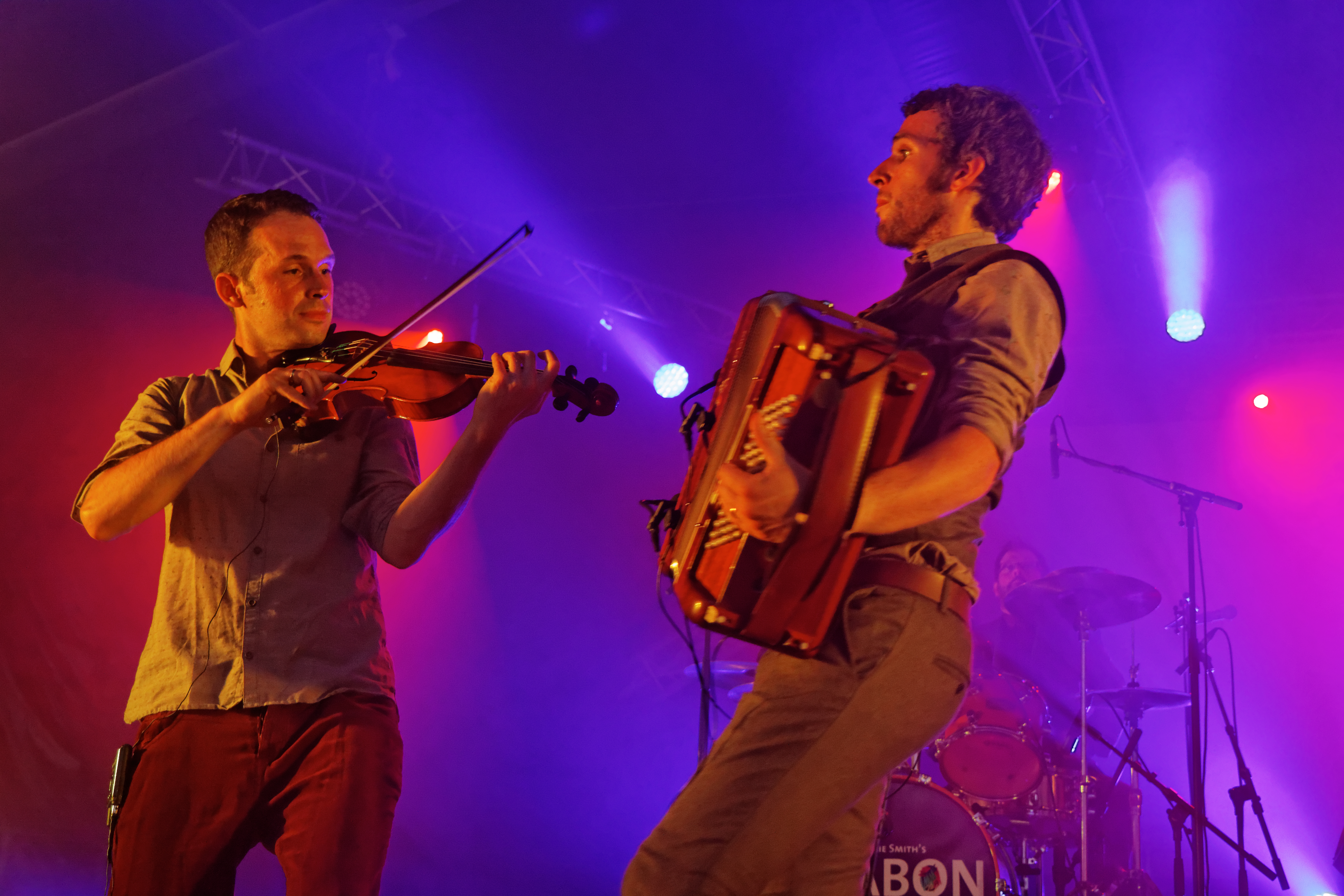
Jamie Smith's Mabon at the Festival de Cornouaille, 2014

- Jamie Smith – accordion and vocals
- Oli Wilson-Dickson – fiddle
- Paul Rogers – guitar
- Matt Downer – bass
- Iolo Whelan – drums and percussion

Previous members: Derek Smith (guitar), Gareth Whelan (fiddle), Jason Rogers (bass guitar), David Killgallon (fiddle), Calum Stewart (flute, uilleann pipes), Ruth Angell (fiddle), Tomas Callister (fiddle), Adam Rhodes (bouzouki), and Ronald Jappy (guitar).

== Discography ==
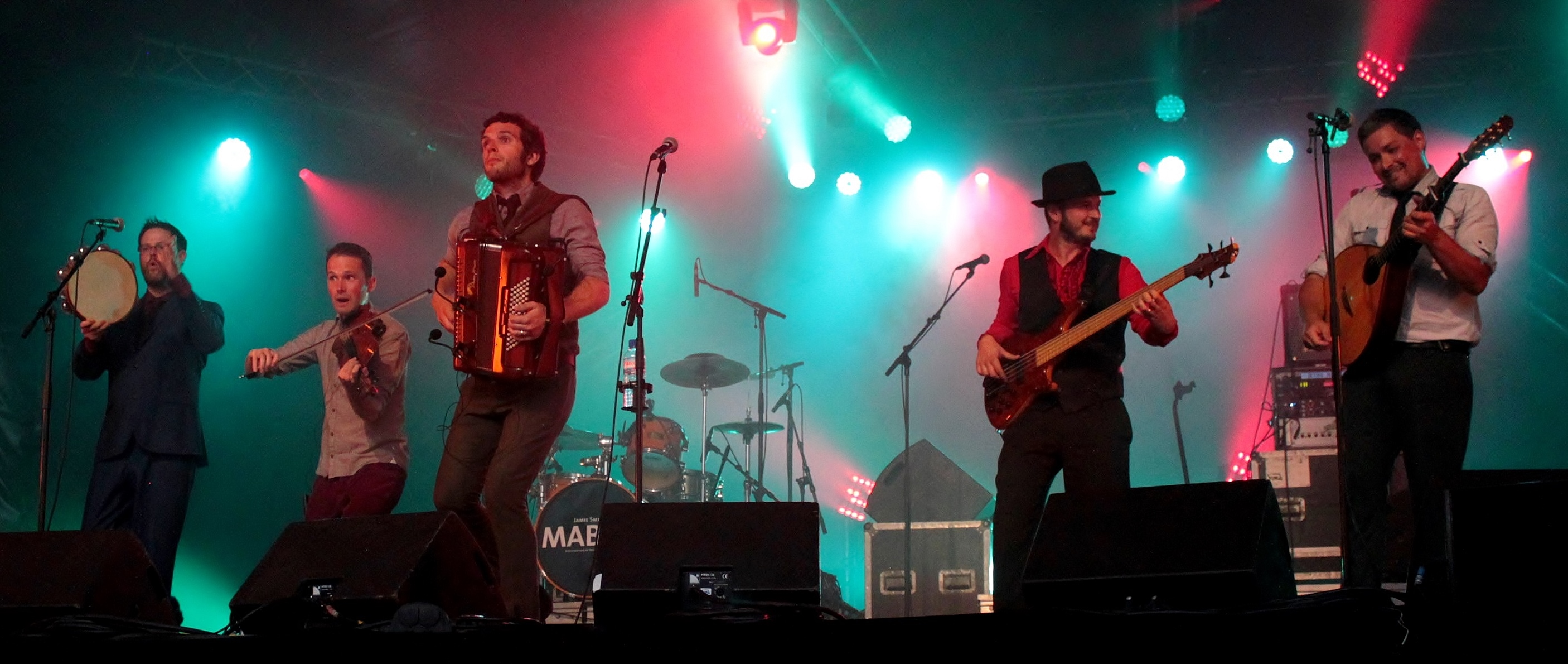
Jamie Smith's Mabon performing live

- Lumps of Mabon (2001)
- Ridiculous Thinkers (2004)
- OK Pewter (2007)
- Live at the Grand Pavilion (2010)
- Windblown (2012)
- The Space Between (2015)
- Twenty - Live! (2018)

== Related ensembles ==
Jamie Smith's Mabon members have performed with other ensembles, including:

- Barrule
- Ímar
- Scran
- Alaw
- Skeeal
