= Barrule (band) =

Manx folk band

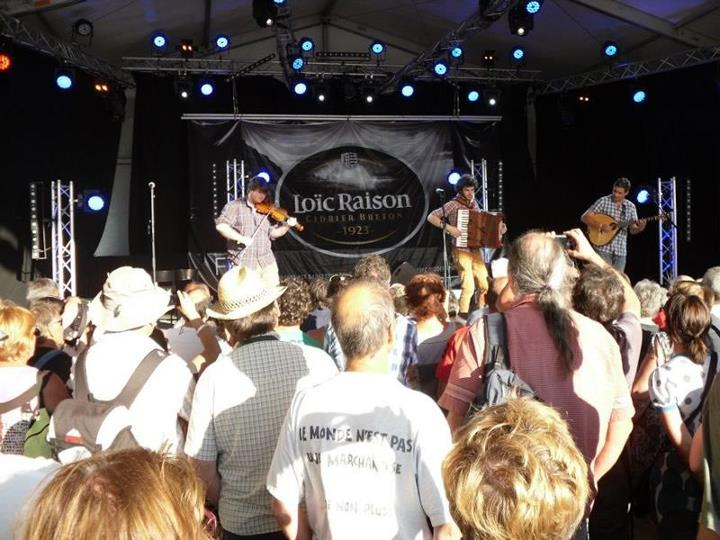
- Barrule; Manx trio Barrule performing at the Festival Interceltique de Lorient in 2012.

Background information
- Origin: Isle of Man
- Genres: Celtic, Folk, Indie Rock
- Years active: 2012-2017
- Label: Easy on the Record
- Members: Tom Callister; Adam Rhodes; Jamie Smith
- Website: www.barruletrio.com

Barrule was a Celtic and folk trio from the Isle of Man. The band's three members were: Tomas Callister (fiddle), Jamie Smith (accordion) and Adam Rhodes (bouzouki). Barrule's discography included both original and traditional Manx language songs.

In 2014, the trio won "Best Debut" in the Spiral Earth awards and have since performed major festivals including Celtic Connections, WOMAD Charlton Park, Sidmouth, Festival Interceltique de Lorient (where they won the prestigious Trophée Loic Raison), Lowender Peran Festival, Cornwall, and the National Celtic Festival in Melbourne.

Barrule's name paid tribute to the Manx summit and Celtic God Manannán mac Lir who made his home there.

The band's website states that they are no longer active as a band.

== Discography ==
Title	Release
Barrule (self titled)	2014
Manannan's Cloak	2015
