= Clash of the Ash =

Single by Runrig

from the album Everything You See
- Released: 14 May 2007
- Recorded: Cromarty, 2007
- Genre: Celtic rock
- Length: 4:50
- Label: Ridge Records
- Songwriter: Calum MacDonald/Rory MacDonald
- Producer: Runrig

Runrig singles chronology
"Empty Glens" (2003)	"Clash of the Ash" (2007)	"Loch Lomond (Hampden Remix)" (2007)

"Clash of the Ash" is the first single from the Scottish Celtic rock band Runrig's thirteenth studio album Everything You See, which was released as a single in 2007. The song is about the sport of shinty and has become an anthem for the sport. Runrig have previously referenced shinty in the songs "Pride of the Summer" from The Cutter and the Clan and "Recovery" from the album of the same name. The song also appeared on the 2013 compilation album Larry Kirwan's Celtic Invasion.

== Background and writing ==
The song is about the sport of shinty and the first verse revolves around a team making their way to an away game, through "straths and glens". Prominent throughout the song is the use of nicknames, which are a common element.

The second verse is a portrayal of a game against Kinlochshiel, the only shinty team named in the song in the line: But if we do all that and there’s no-one spare
Tell me who’s gonna mark the Kinlochshiel Bear. This verse refers to various positions on the shinty park as well as the sawdust, a reference to the penalty box a.k.a. the "D" which is often marked out with sawdust instead of paint.

The final verse references shinty's long history (shared with hurling) which stretches back to ancient Celtic history:
'And for every fighting Highland man
Stand by your brother, die for the clan.

The song also praises the amateur status of those who play the sport:
These shinty boys shine like the sun.
We don’t play for fame, we don’t play for cash
We just play for the glory, and the clash of the ash.

== Live performance history ==
"Clash of the Ash" was played live at the "Year of the Flood" concert in 2007 featuring Gary Innes. It is usually played towards the end of a concert, it was played live at the "Party on the Moor" concert in 2013 as the 27th song.

== Track listing ==
=== CD single (Netherlands) ===
1. "Clash of the Ash" (Fiddle – Adam Sutherland, written by Calum Macdonald, Rory Macdonald) – 2:40
2. "Sona" (written by Calum Macdonald, Malcolm Jones and Rory Macdonald) – 3:25

=== CD single (UK and Denmark) ===
1. "Clash of the Ash" (Fiddle – Adam Sutherland, written by Calum Macdonald, Rory Macdonald) – 2:40

== Chart performance ==
Chart (2007)	Peak position
UK Singles (OCC)	110
