= Latha Math =

Single by Mànran
- Released: 17 January 2011
- Recorded: 2010
- Genre: Folk rock
- Length: 3:27
- Label: Mànran Records
- Songwriter: Norrie MacIver

Mànran singles chronology
"Latha Math" (2011)	"Take You There" (2012)

"Latha Math" (English: Good day or Greetings) is a single from the Scottish Gaelic group Mànran. The song was written by Norrie MacIver, who was the band's singer until he left in December 2015. The single was released in the United Kingdom on 17 January 2011 as a digital download. The band were aiming to be the first Gaelic song in the Top 40 for the 21st Century. While the song achieved Number 29 by mid-week, they slipped out of the Top 40 to Number 61 for the official chart on Sunday 23 January 2011. However, they did secure Number 6 in both the UK Indie Chart and the Scottish Singles Chart.

== Music video ==
A music video to accompany the release of "Latha Math" was first released onto YouTube on 19 January 2011; at a total length of three minutes and thirty-four seconds, it was directed by Rachel Hendry.

== Track listing ==
Digital download
No.	Title	Length
1.	"Latha Math"	3:27

== Chart performance ==
Chart (2011)	Peak position
Scotland Singles (OCC)	6
UK Indie (OCC)	6
UK Singles (The Official Charts Company)	61

== Release history ==
Country	Date	Format	Label
United Kingdom	17 January 2011	Digital download	Mànran Records
