= Mànran =

Scottish folk band

- Mànran performing in Germany, 2022

Background information
- Origin: Glasgow, Scotland
- Genres: Gaelic; Scottish folk; rock
- Years active: 2010–present
- Members: Ewen Henderson; Gary Innes; Ryan Murphy; Marcus Cordock; Mark Scobbie; Kim Carnie; Aidan Moodie
- Past members: Norrie MacIver; Scott Mackay; Calum Stewart; Craig Irving; Ross Saunders
- Website: manran.co.uk

Mànran are a Scottish folk band established in Inverness in June 2010. The band performs in both Scottish Gaelic and English and currently consists of seven members; including vocalist Kim Carnie, multi-instrumentalist Ewen Henderson and accordionist Gary Innes. The band's name is taken from a Scottish Gaelic word for a melodic sound or a sweet tone.

Since their 2010 formation, Mànran have performed in over thirty countries, including at several international folk and world music festivals. Their 2013 tour of America was the subject of a documentary by BBC Alba.

== Career ==
=== 2010-2011: Formation and breakthrough ===
Friends and fellow musicians Gary Innes and Ewen Henderson first discussed the idea of a band in the Inverness Aquadome, with the aim of "getting a Gaelic song into the UK Top 40." The two then added Norrie MacIver and Calum Stewart to the band; Ross Saunders and Scott Mackay then joined through mutual friends in the Glasgow music community. However, Stewart left the band in 2012 due to family commitments; Irish musician Ryan Murphy subsequently joined after graduating from university.

On 17 January 2011, the band released their first single "Latha Math" and were aiming to be the first Gaelic song in the 21st century to make the Top 40. While the band reached 29 mid-week, they slipped out of the top 40 to Number 61 for the official chart on Sunday 23 January 2011. However, they did secure Number 6 in both the UK Indie Chart and the Scottish Singles Chart. In August 2012 they released "Take You There" with Michelle McManus to raise money for the STV Appeal 2012. Mànran and Michelle McManus performed the song live on 7 September 2012 on the STV Appeal show.

=== 2012–present ===
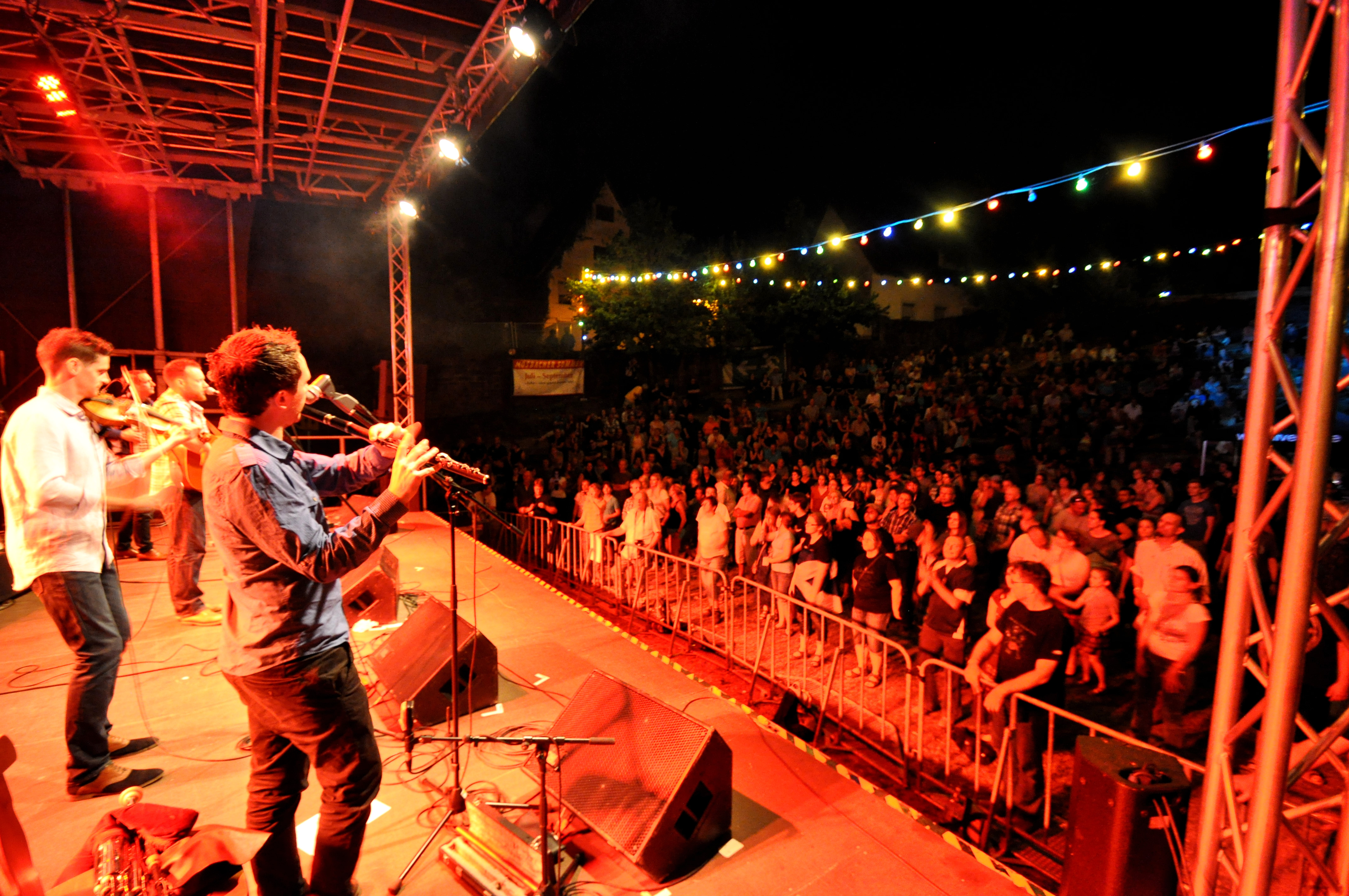
Mànran on stage at the "Folk am Neckar" festival 2015 in Mosbach (Germany)

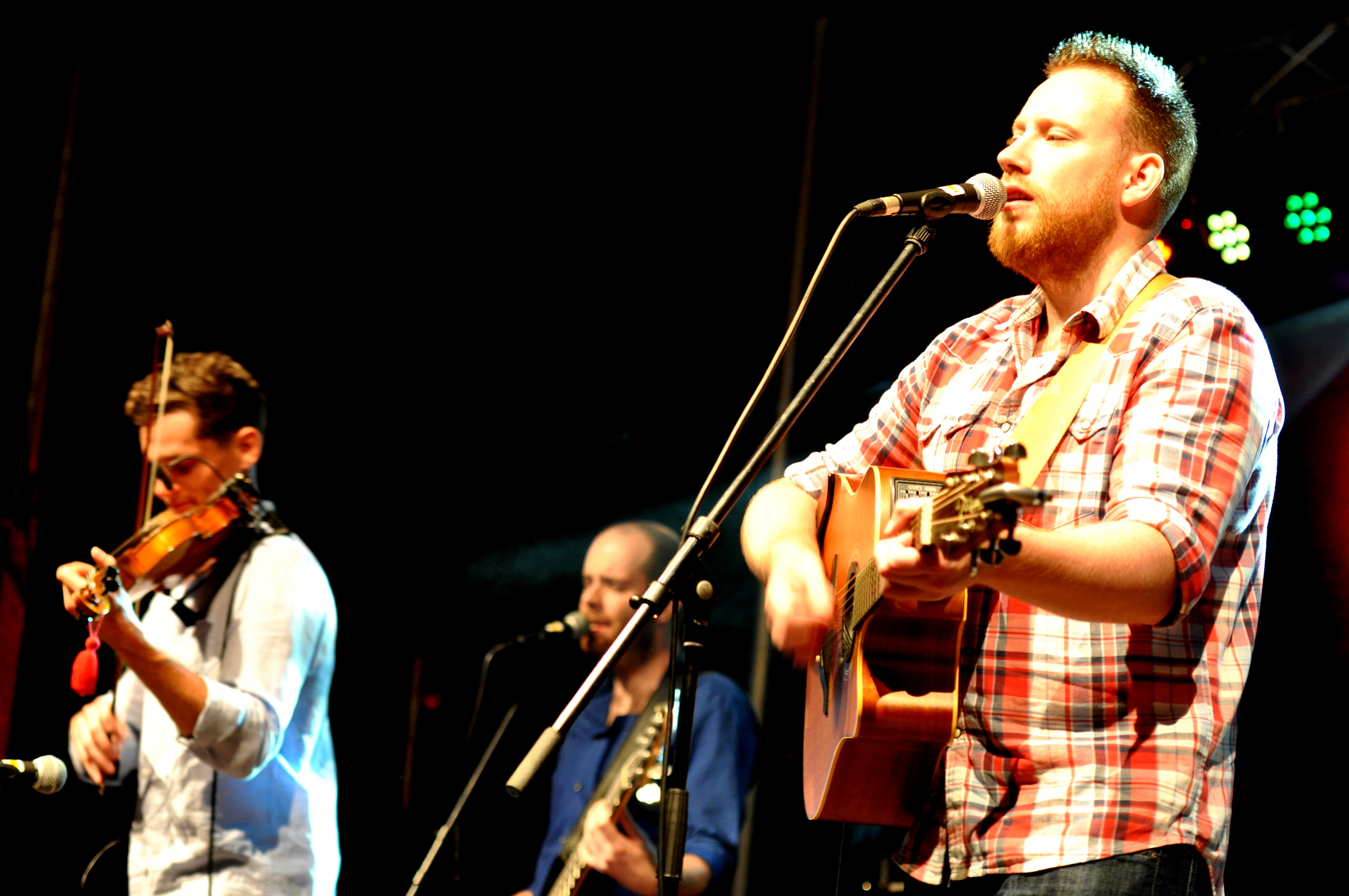
Mànran on stage at the "Folk am Neckar" festival 2015 in Mosbach(Germany)

In September 2012, Calum Stewart left the band to be replaced by Irish Uilleann piper and flautist Ryan Murphy. The band recorded their second album The Test in early 2013 which they released in May of the same year. The album won a German critics choice award in December 2013. In August of that year the band made its debut in America at the world-renowned Milwaukee Irish festival in Wisconsin, followed by a five-week tour that saw the band play in Chicago, Bay City, New Hampshire, Albany, California, Arizona and Iowa. After America, the band went to Australia to perform at the Australasian World Music Festival to critical acclaim.

In 2014, they were awarded International Artist of the Year at the Australian Celtic Music Awards. Three years later, they released their third studio album An Dà Là. The title song, criticising the election of Donald Trump as president of the United States, was noted for "invok[ing] the voice of Gaeldom, spanning centuries as it flows between a lament for the past and an anthem for the future". Norrie MacIver left the band in late 2015 to pursue other projects; he eventually joined fellow Scottish band Skipinnish.

In 2018, the band performed at the Celtic Connections festival which was live-streamed to 125,000 people, and toured France, Germany and Denmark. The following year, Mànran toured Australia for five weeks; they also recruited new members in Gaelic vocalist Kim Carnie and guitarist Aidan Moodie in 2019.

On 22 October 2021, the band self-released their fourth studio album, Ùrar.

== Members ==
=== Current ===
- Ewen Henderson – multi-instrumentalist
- Gary Innes – accordion
- Kim Carnie – vocals
- Ryan Murphy – whistles, uilleann pipes
- Marcus Cordock – bass guitar
- Mark Scobbie – drums
- Aidan Moodie – guitar

=== Former ===
- Norrie MacIver
- Scott Mackay
- Calum Stewart
- Craig Irving
- Ross Saunders

== Discography ==
=== Albums ===
| Year | Album details |
|---|---|
| 2011 | Mànran: Released: 15 July 2011; Label: Mànran; Formats: CD, digital download |
| 2013 | The Test: Released: June 2013; Label: Mànran; Formats: CD, digital download |
| 2017 | An Dà Là: Released: January 2017; Label: Mànran; Formats: CD, digital download |
| 2021 | Ùrar: Released: 22 October 2021; Label: Mànran; Formats: CD, digital download |

=== Singles ===
| Year | Title | Peak chart positions | | | Album |
| Year | Title | UK | UK Indie | SCO | Album |
|---|---|---|---|---|---|
| 2011 | "Latha Math" | 61 | 6 | 6 | Mànran |
| 2012 | "Take You There" (with Michelle McManus) | — | — | 70 | Charity single |
| 2016 | "An Dà Là" | | | | An Dà Là |
| 2017 | "When You Go" | | | | N/A |
| 2018 | "Là Inbhir Lochaidh" | | | | N/A |
| 2019 | "Thugainn" | | | | N/A |
| 2020 | "Oran na Cloiche" (Note: Live at Hebridean Celtic Festival 2019) | | | | N/A |
| 2023 | "Wild Mountain Thyme" | | | | N/A |
