= Blaggards =

Celtic rock band from Houston, Texas

- Origin: Houston, Texas, United States
- Genres: Celtic Rock, Celtic Punk
- Years active: 2004 - Present
- Label: NFA Recordings
- Members: Patrick Devlin; Chad Smalley; Kevin Newton; Emilio Arredondo
- Past members: Turi Hoiseth; Brian Vogel; Chris Buckley; James Edwards; Michael McAloon; Eric C. Hughes
- Website: Official Site

Blaggards are an American Celtic rock band from Houston, Texas. The Houston Press has described them as "H-town's heir to the emerald throne of Phil Lynott and Shane MacGowan".

== History ==
Blaggards are led by guitarist and singer Patrick Devlin, who grew up in Dublin, Ireland listening to Irish rebel music and heavy metal bands like Black Sabbath and Iron Maiden.

After moving to Houston in 1994, Devlin fronted an Irish rock band called On The Dole for several years before starting Blaggards in July 2004 with bass player Chad Smalley (son of Nobel laureate Richard Smalley), violinist Turi Hoiseth, and drummer Brian Vogel. Hoiseth and Vogel have since left the band, leaving Devlin and Smalley as the only original members.

Blaggards have toured nationally and internationally, and performed at South by Southwest 2008, where they were the only Celtic-based act on the official schedule.

Their music has been played on the Sirius Satellite Radio program Celtic Crush, hosted by Larry Kirwan of Black 47. In 2013 he included their recording of The Irish Rover on his compilation album Larry Kirwan's Celtic Invasion.

The song "Big Strong Man" from Blaggards' first album Standards appears in the 2010 British film The Kid, directed by Nick Moran.

“Big Strong Man” and "Drunken Sailor" (also from Standards) were both featured in episode 86 of the CBS series The Good Wife, aired on March 24, 2013.

== Members ==
- Patrick Devlin - Vocals and guitar
- Chad Smalley - Vocals and bass
- Kevin Newton - Drums
- Emilio Arredondo - Fiddle and vocals

== Discography ==
- Standards (2005)

   1. Drunken Sailor
   2. Bog Songs
   3. Big Strong Man (Yakety Sax)
   4. Prison Love Songs (Folsom Prison Blues/ The Fields of Athenry)
   5. Slapper's Medley
   6. Foggy Dew
   7. Botany Bay
   8. Rocky Road to Dublin
   9. Suspicious Minds
   10. Irish Rover

- Live in Texas (2010)

   1. Waxie's Dargle (Live)
   2. Whiskey in the Jar (Live)
   3. Rocky Road to Dublin (Live)
   4. Spancil Hill (Live)
   5. Slapper's Medley (Live)
   6. Leaving of Liverpool (Live)
   7. Botany Bay (Live)
   8. Foggy Dew (Live)
   9. Big Strong Man (Live)
   10. Drunken Sailor (Live)
   11. Bog Songs (Live)
   12. Wild Rover (Live)
   13. Irish Rover (Live)

- BLAGMATIC (2021)

   1. Moonshiner
   2. Spanish Lady
   3. Sweet 16
   4. Delilah
   5. Rain or Shine
   6. PLFM
   7. Wild Rover
   8. 2nd Worst
   9. Wagon Wheel
   10. Spancil Hill
   11. Lights of El Paso
