= Mychal Judge =

American Franciscan friar and chaplain who was the first official 9/11 victim

The Reverend Father Mychal Judge OFM
- Mychal Judge

Orders
- Ordination: 1961

Personal details
- Born: Robert Emmett Judge; May 11, 1933 Brooklyn, New York City, U.S.
- Died: September 11, 2001 (aged 68) World Trade Center, Manhattan, New York City, U.S.
- Cause of death: Collapse of 2 World Trade Center as part of the September 11 attacks
- Denomination: Roman Catholic
- Occupation: Chaplain to the New York City Fire Department
- Education: St. Bonaventure University, Holy Name College Seminary

Sainthood
- Feast day: September 11 (OCCA)
- Venerated in: Orthodox-Catholic Church of America
- Title as Saint: Saint Mychal Judge or Saint Mychal the Martyr
- Canonized: July 27, 2002 by Orthodox-Catholic Church of America
- Attributes: Brown Robes
- Shrines: St. Mychal the Martyr Parish at 3564 Clays Mill Rd. Lexington, Kentucky

Mychal Fallon Judge, OFM (born Robert Emmett Judge; May 11, 1933 – September 11, 2001), was an American Franciscan friar and Catholic priest who served as a chaplain to the New York City Fire Department. While serving in that capacity, he was killed, becoming the first certified fatality of the September 11 attacks.

== Early life ==
Judge was born Robert Emmett Judge on May 11, 1933, in Brooklyn, New York, the son of immigrants from County Leitrim, Ireland, and the firstborn of fraternal twins. His twin sister, Dympna, was born two days later. Judge was baptized in St. Paul's Church in Brooklyn on June 4. The twins, and their older sister Erin, grew up during the Great Depression in Boerum Hill, Brooklyn.

From the ages of three to six, he watched his father suffer and die from mastoiditis, a slow and painful illness of the skull and inner ear. To earn income after his father's death, Judge shined shoes at New York Penn Station and visited St. Francis of Assisi Church across the street. Seeing the Franciscan friars there, he later said, "I realized that I didn't care for material things. ... I knew then that I wanted to be a friar."

== Career ==
After spending his freshman year at the St. Francis Preparatory School in Queens, where he studied under the Franciscan Brothers of Brooklyn, in 1948, at the age of 15, Judge began the formation process to enter the Order of Friars Minor. He transferred to St. Joseph's Seraphic Seminary in Callicoon, New York, the minor seminary of the Holy Name province of the Order. After graduation, he enrolled at St. Bonaventure University in Olean, New York. In 1954 he was admitted to the novitiate of the Province in Paterson, New Jersey. After completing that year of formation, he received the religious habit and professed his first vows as a member of the Order. At that time, he was given the religious name of Fallon Michael. He later dropped 'Fallon' and changed 'Michael' to Mychal. According to Queer There and Everywhere by Sarah Prager, Mychal changed his name to "differentiate himself from all the other 'Father Michaels.'" He resumed his college studies at St. Bonaventure University, where he earned a bachelor's degree in 1957. He professed his solemn vows as a full member of the Order in 1958. Following this, he did his theological studies at Holy Name College Seminary in Washington, D.C. Upon completing these studies in 1961, he was ordained a priest.

After his ordination, Judge was assigned to the Shrine of St. Anthony in Boston, Massachusetts. Following his assignment there, he served in various parishes served by the Franciscans: St. Joseph Parish in East Rutherford, New Jersey, Sacred Heart Parish in Rochelle Park, New Jersey, Holy Cross Parish in the Bronx and St. Joseph Parish in West Milford, New Jersey. For three years he served as assistant to the President of Siena College, operated by the Franciscans in Loudonville, New York. In 1986 he was assigned to St. Francis of Assisi Church in Manhattan, where he had first come to know the friars. He lived and worked there until his death.

Around 1971, Judge developed alcoholism, although he never showed obvious signs. In 1978, with the support of Alcoholics Anonymous, he became sober and continued to share his personal story of alcoholism to help others facing addiction.

In 1992, Judge was appointed a chaplain to the New York City Fire Department. As chaplain, he offered encouragement and prayers at fires, rescues, and hospitals, and counseled firemen and their families, often working 16-hour days. "His whole ministry was about love. Mychal loved the fire department and they loved him." Judge was a member of AFSCME Local 299 (District Council 37).

Judge was also well known in the city for ministering to the homeless, the hungry, recovering alcoholics, people with AIDS, the sick, injured, and grieving, immigrants, gays and lesbians, and those alienated by society. Judge once gave the winter coat off his back to a homeless woman in the street, later saying, "She needed it more than me." When he anointed a man who was dying of AIDS, the man asked him, "Do you think God hates me?" Judge picked him up, kissed him, and silently rocked him in his arms. Judge worked with St. Clare's Hospital, which opened the city's first AIDS ward, in order to start an active AIDS ministry. He visited hospitals and AIDS patients and their families, presided over many funerals, and counseled other Catholics such as Brendan Fay and John J. McNeill. Judge continued to be an advocate for gay rights throughout the rest of his life, marching in pride parades and attending other gay events.

Even before his death, many considered Judge to be a living saint for his extraordinary works of charity and his deep spirituality. While praying, he would sometimes "become so lost in God, as if lost in a trance, that he'd be shocked to find several hours had passed." Judge's spiritual director, the late Jesuit McNeill, observed that Judge achieved an "extraordinary degree of union with the divine. We knew we were dealing with someone directly in line with God."

== September 11 attacks ==
The famous photograph of Judge on 9/11
- Rescue workers carry fatally injured New York City Fire Department Chaplain, Father Mychal Judge, from one of the World Trade Center towers, early September 11, 2001. by Shannon Stapleton for Reuters

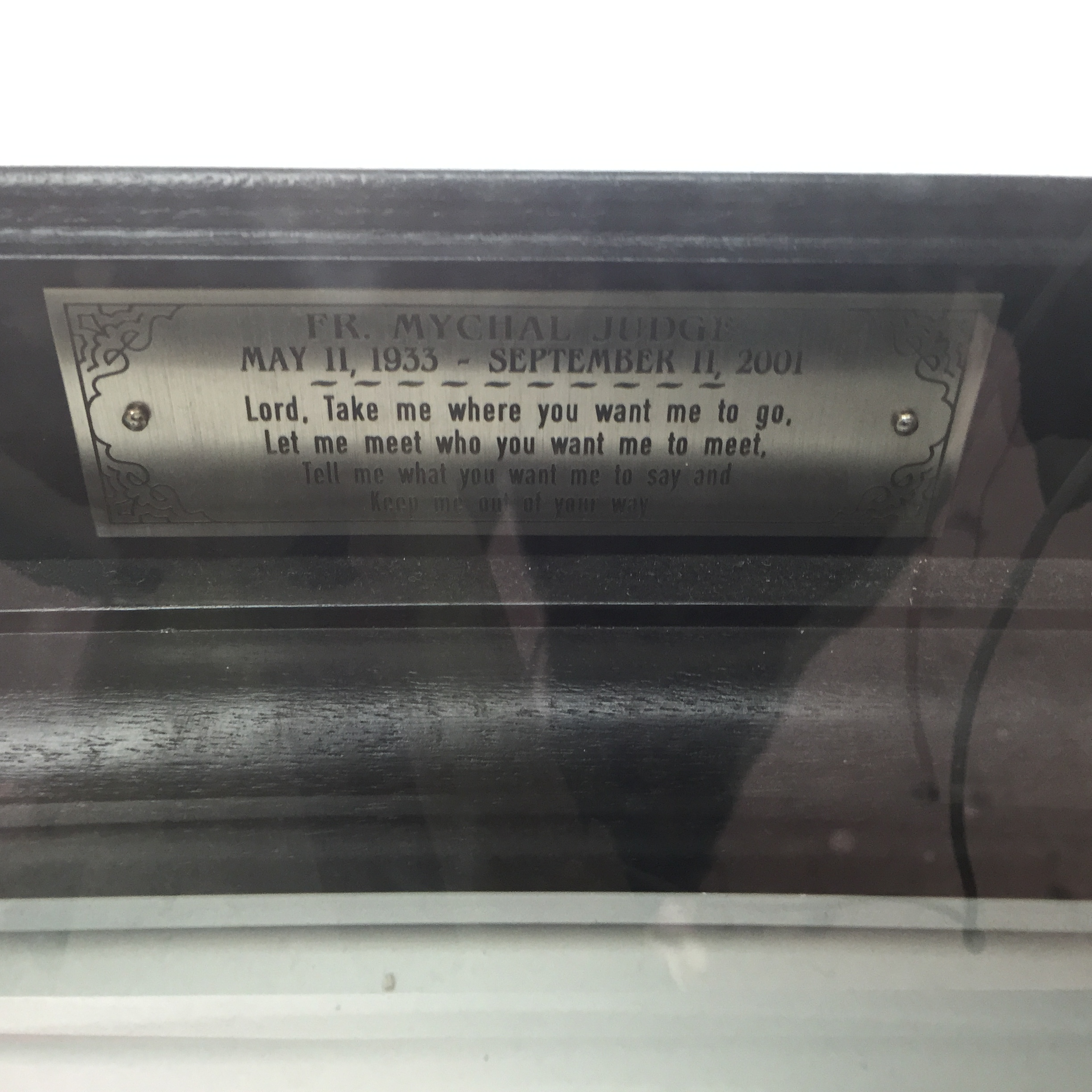
Judge's memorial inscription: "FR. MYCHAL JUDGE MAY 11, 1933 – SEPTEMBER 11, 2001 Lord, Take me where you want me to go, Let me meet who you want me to meet, Tell me what you want me to say and Keep me out of your way.

On September 11, 2001, after learning that the World Trade Center had been hit by the first of two jetliners, Judge rushed to the site. He was met by Rudy Giuliani, the Mayor of New York City, who asked him to pray for the city and its victims. Judge prayed over bodies lying on the streets, then entered the lobby of the North Tower, where an emergency command post had been organized. There he continued offering aid and prayers for the rescuers, the injured, and the dead.

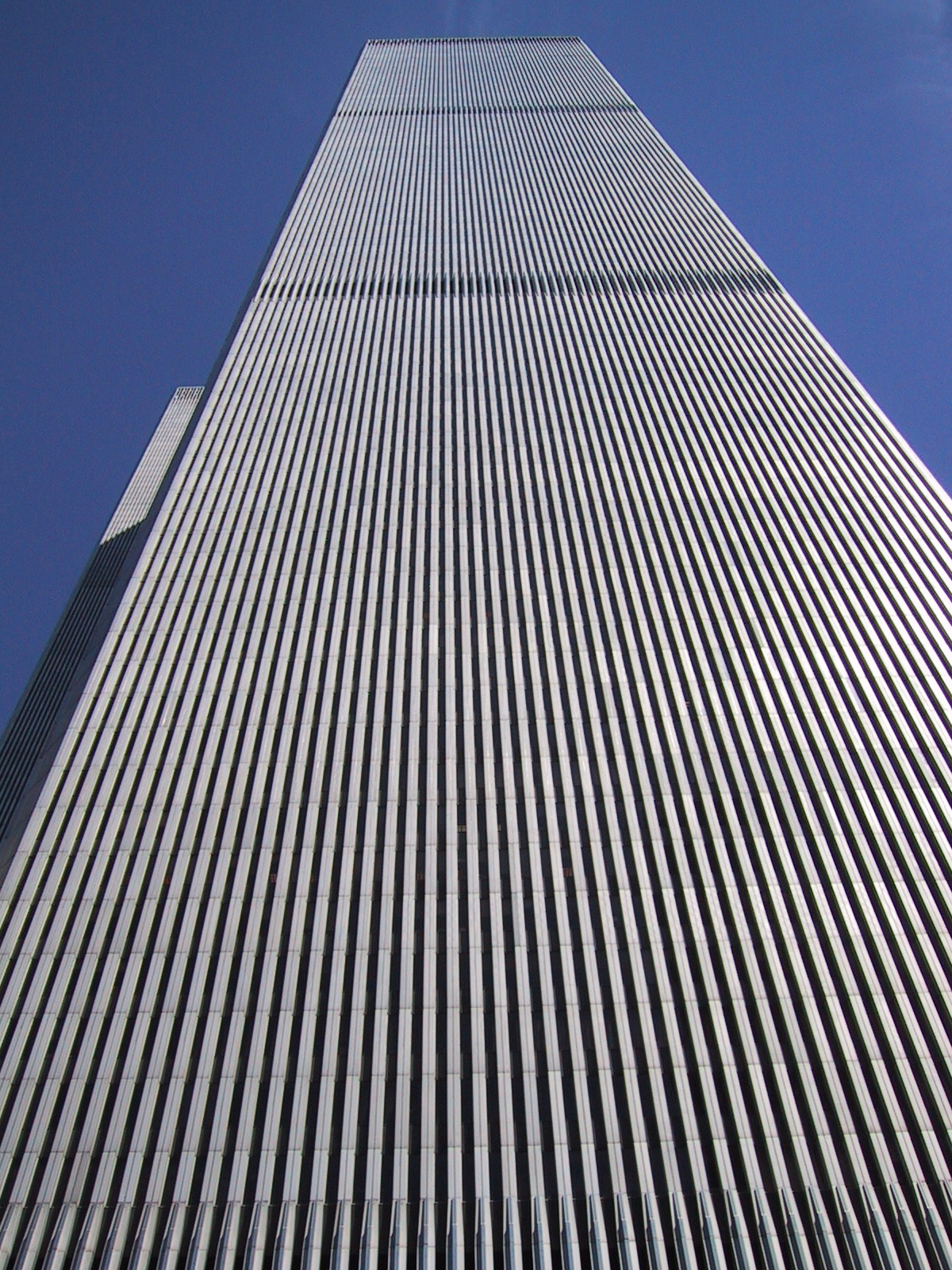
Judge died when debris from the South Tower was ejected into the lobby of the North Tower during the collapse of the World Trade Center. This image of the South Tower was photographed nine days before the attacks occurred.

When the neighboring South Tower collapsed at 9:59 a.m., debris flew through the North Tower lobby, killing many inside. Judge died at this moment, struck and killed by the debris. According to a later interview with 1st Battalion Chief Joseph Pfeifer, it was initially believed that he had suffered a heart attack. In the moments before his death, Judge was repeatedly praying aloud, "Jesus, please end this right now! God, please end this!", according to Judge's biographer and New York Daily News columnist Michael Daly.

Shortly after his death, Judge's body was found and carried out of the North Tower by five people (Firefighters Christian Waugh and Zachary Vause, NYPD Lt. William Cosgrove, civilian John Maguire and FDNY EMT Kevin Allen) shortly before the building collapsed at 10:28 a.m. This act was photographed by Reuters photographer Shannon Stapleton and became one of the most famous images of the attacks. It was also captured in the documentary film 9/11, shot by Jules and Gédéon Naudet. Philadelphia Weekly reported that the photograph is "considered an American Pietà." Judge's body was placed before the altar of St. Peter's Catholic Church before being taken by ambulance and fire department colleagues to Engine 1/Ladder 24, the fire station opposite the Franciscan Friary on W 31st Street in Manhattan. He was later taken from the fire station to the medical examiner.

Judge was designated as "Victim 0001" and thereby recognized as the first named victim of the attacks. Although thousands of others had been killed before him, with Daniel Lewin widely believed to have been the first chronological fatality, Judge was the first certified fatality because his body was the first to be recovered and taken to the medical examiner.

Judge's body was formally identified by NYPD Detective Steven McDonald, a longtime friend. The New York Medical Examiner found that Judge died of "blunt force trauma to the head".

== Personal life ==
Following his death, several of Judge's friends and associates revealed that he was gay. According to Fire Department Commissioner Thomas Von Essen: "I actually knew about his homosexuality when I was in the Uniformed Firefighters Association. I kept the secret, but then he told me when I became commissioner five years ago. He and I often laughed about it, because we knew how difficult it would have been for the other firemen to accept it as easily as I had. I just thought he was a phenomenal, warm, sincere man, and the fact that he was gay just had nothing to do with anything."

Judge developed a romantic relationship with a Filipino nurse named Al Alvarado in the last year of his life, which he documented in his diaries. The two often did not see each other for months because of Judge's work as a firefighter. In spite of this relationship, Judge was strict in keeping his vow of celibacy.

The revelations about his sexual orientation were not without controversy. Dennis Lynch, a lawyer, wrote an article about Judge that appeared on the website catholic.org. Lynch argued that Judge was not gay and that any attempt to define him as gay was due to "homosexual activists" who wanted to "attack the Catholic Church" and turn the priest into a "homosexual icon". Others refuted Lynch with evidence that Judge did identify himself as gay, both to others and in his personal journals.

Judge was a long-term member of Dignity, a Catholic LGBT activist organization that advocates for change in the Catholic Church's teaching on homosexuality. On October 1, 1986, the Vatican's Congregation for the Doctrine of the Faith issued the document On the Pastoral Care of Homosexual Persons, which declared homosexuality to be a "strong tendency ordered toward an intrinsic moral evil". In response, many bishops, including Cardinal John O'Connor, banned Dignity from diocesan churches under their control. Judge then welcomed Dignity's AIDS ministry to the Church of St. Francis of Assisi, which is under the control of the Franciscan friars, thereby partially circumventing the cardinal's ban.

Judge disagreed with official Catholic teaching regarding homosexuality. He often asked, "Is there so much love in the world that we can afford to discriminate against any kind of love?"

== Legacy ==
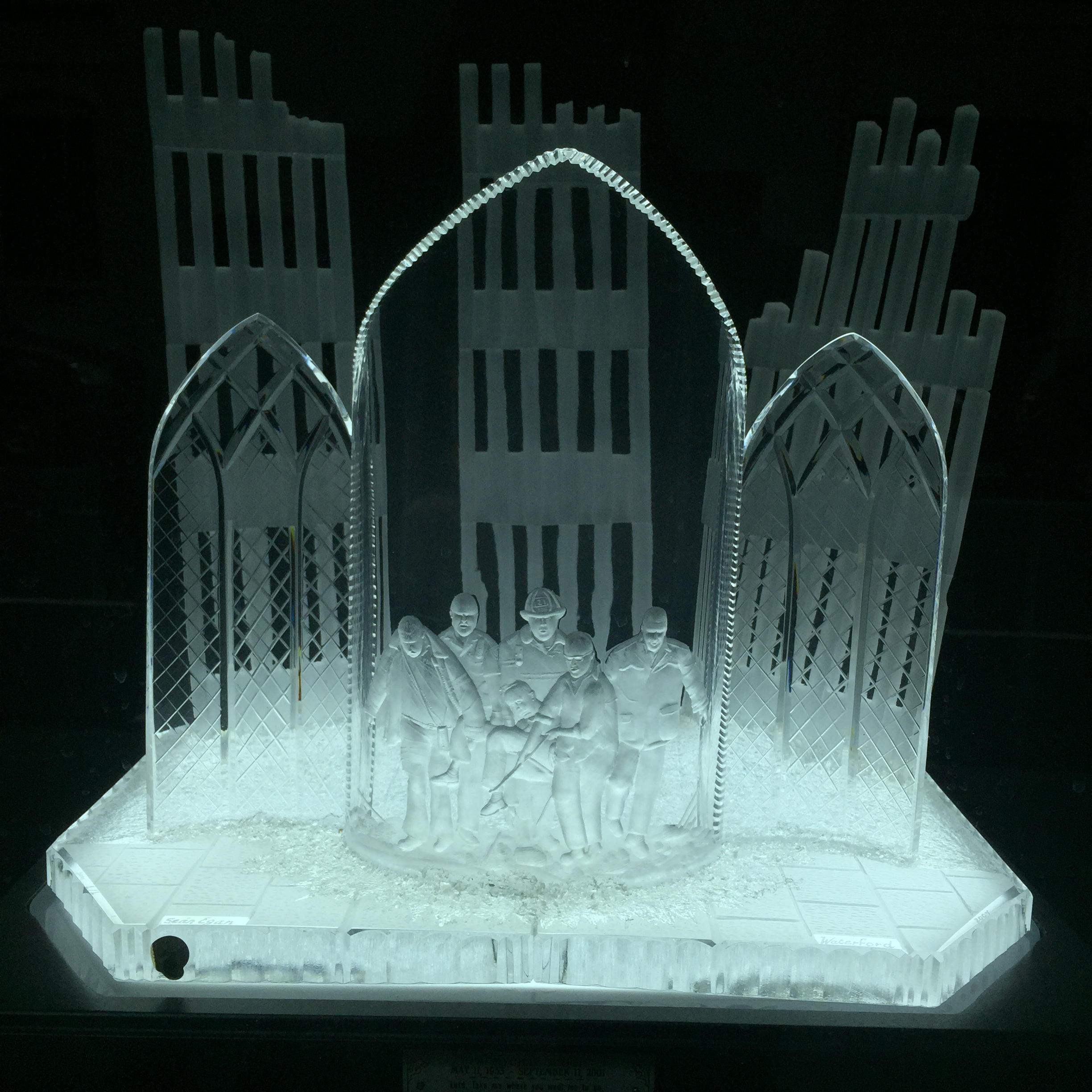
The FDNY Memorial to Judge at Engine 1, Ladder 24 in Manhattan

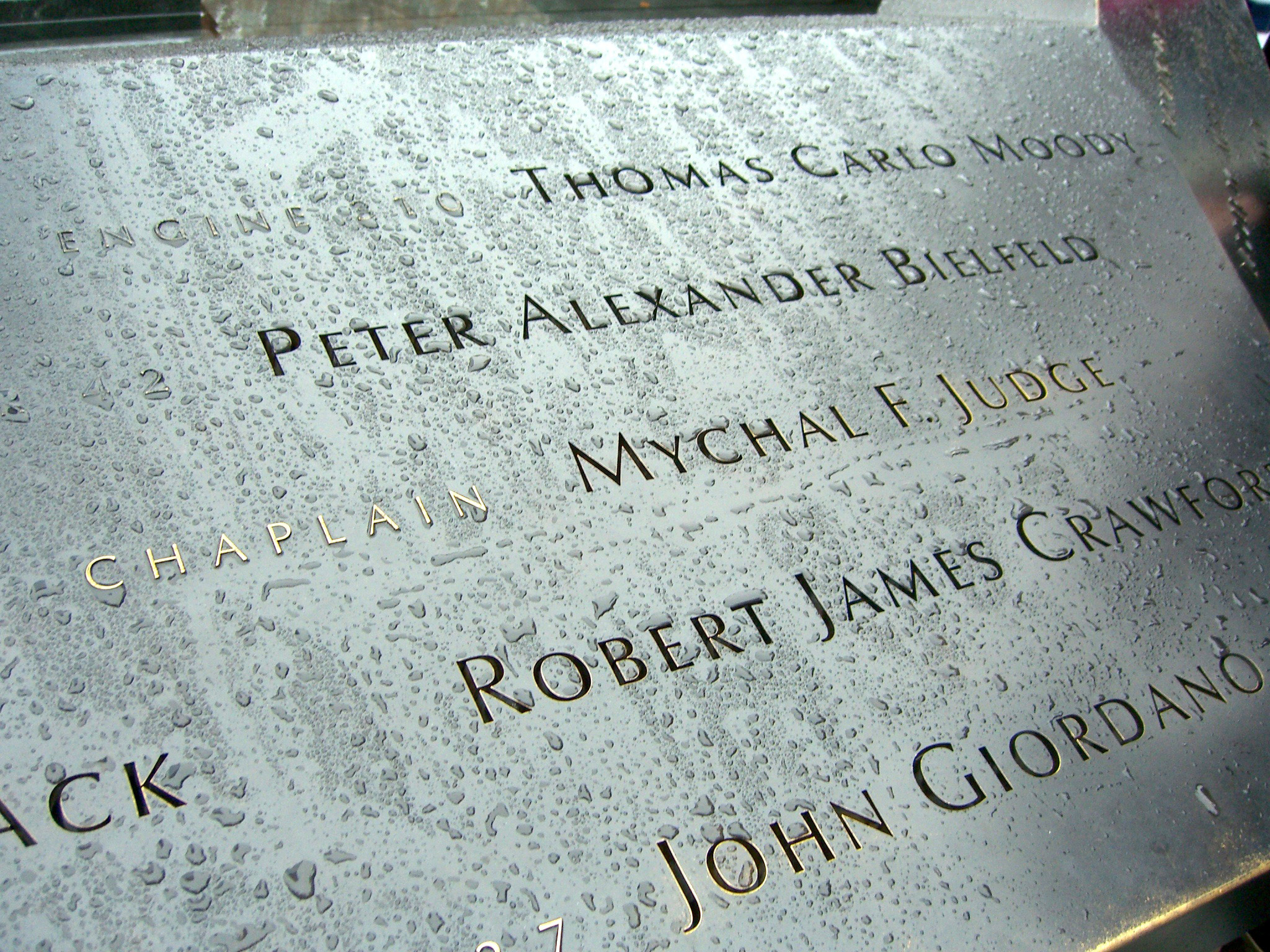
Judge's name is located on Panel S-18 of the National September 11 Memorial's South Pool, along with those of other first responders.

On September 15, 2001, 3,000 people attended Judge's funeral Mass at St. Francis of Assisi Church, which was presided over by Cardinal Edward Egan, the Archbishop of New York. Former President Bill Clinton and Senator Hillary Rodham Clinton also attended. President Clinton said that Judge's death was a "special loss. We should lift his life up as an example of what has to prevail. We have to be more like Father Mike than the people who killed him."

Judge was buried in the friars' plot at Holy Sepulchre Cemetery in Totowa, New Jersey. On October 11, 2001, Brendan Fay organized a "Month's Mind Memorial" in Good Shepherd Chapel, General Theological Seminary, New York. It was an evening of prayer, stories, traditional Irish music, and personal testimonials about Judge.

Some Catholics called for the canonization of Judge. The Orthodox-Catholic Church of America declared him a saint. Two people have said they experienced miraculous healings through prayers to Judge.

Judge's fire helmet was presented to Pope John Paul II. France awarded him the Légion d'honneur. Some members of the United States Congress nominated him for the Congressional Gold Medal, as well as the Presidential Medal of Freedom. In 2002, the City of New York renamed the portion of West 31st Street on which the friary where he lived is located as "Father Mychal F. Judge Street", and christened a commuter ferry the Father Mychal Judge in his honor in 2002.

In 2002, the United States Congress passed The Mychal Judge Police and Fire Chaplains Public Safety Officers Benefit Act into law. The law extended federal death benefits to chaplains of police and fire departments, and also marked the first time the federal government extended equal benefits for same-sex couples by allowing the domestic partners of public safety officers killed in the line of duty to collect a federal death benefit. This act was signed into law on June 24, 2002, but would be retroactive only to September 11, 2001.

The New York Press Club instituted The Rev. Mychal Judge Heart of New York Award, which is presented annually for the news story or series that is most complimentary of New York City.

Alvernia University, a private independent college in the Franciscan tradition in Reading, Pennsylvania, named a new residence hall in honor of Judge.

The Father Mychal Judge Memorial in the village of Keshcarrigan, County Leitrim, Ireland, was dedicated in 2005, on donated land which had belonged to Judge's ancestors. People from the village and surrounding area celebrate his life every year on the 9/11 anniversary.

The 2006 documentary film Saint of 9/11 was directed by Glenn Holsten, co-produced by Brendan Fay, and narrated by Sir Ian McKellen.

Larry Kirwan, leader of the Irish-American band Black 47, wrote the tribute song "Mychal" in honor of Judge, which appeared on the band's 2004 album New York Town.

The Father Mychal Judge Walk of Remembrance takes place every year in New York on the Sunday before the 9/11 anniversary. It begins with a Mass at St. Francis Church on West 31st Street, then proceeds to the site of Ground Zero, retracing Judge's final journey and praying along the way. Every September 11, there is a Mass in memory of Judge in Boston, attended by many who lost family members on 9/11.

At the National September 11 Memorial, Judge is memorialized at the South Pool, on Panel S-18, where other first responders are located.

In 2014, Judge was inducted into the Legacy Walk, an outdoor public display which celebrates LGBT history and people.

In 2015, a statue was dedicated to Judge at St. Joseph's Park in East Rutherford, New Jersey, across the street from St. Joseph's Parish where he served for several years.

In recognition of his heroic actions and his commitment to the dignity of LGBTQ people, Judge was posthumously awarded the Dooley Award by GALA-ND/SMC, an alumni organization of the University of Notre Dame, a prominent American Catholic university.

In September 2021, Judge was nominated for sainthood in the Catholic Church.

A documentary film directed by Brendan Fay that focuses on Judge, Remembering Mychal, premiered on October 26, 2021, in New York City. Featured voices in the film include Malachy McCourt and Pete Hamill.

=== Canonization debate ===
Several organizations have proposed to the Vatican a possible canonization, to which the Archdiocese of New York and the Franciscan Third Order have not given clear answers. However, Christian denominations that are not in communion with Rome have canonized him, recognizing him as a saint and a martyr while his tomb, in the Holy Sepulchre Cemetery of Totowa, has been becoming a kind of "informal sanctuary".

The fact that Judge disagreed with the Catholic Church official doctrine on homosexuality is likely to be an impediment to beatification. Postulators have argued that there are precedents of saints and openly LGBT martyrs. In 2021, 20 years after his death, an official cause was initiated, but without the official support of the Archdiocese of New York, but from an independent postulator, the Rv. Luis Fernando Escalante, directly in charge of the cause in Rome.
