= OCCA =

OCCA can refer to:

- Oklahoma Court of Criminal Appeals
- Organized Crime Control Act
- Orthodox Catholic Church of America
