= Home of the Brave (Black 47 album) =

Studio album by Black 47
- Released: 1994
- Genre: Celtic rock
- Length: 71:03
- Label: SBK
- Producers: Larry Kirwan; Jerry Harrison

Black 47 chronology
Fire of Freedom (1993)	Home of the Brave (1994)	Green Suede Shoes (1996)

Home of the Brave is an album by the American band Black 47, released in 1994. The band supported the album with a North American tour and an appearance on The Tonight Show with Jay Leno. The first single was "Losin' It".

== Production ==
The album was produced by frontman Larry Kirwan and Jerry Harrison. Harrison was on a list of names provided by Black 47's record label; the band appreciated his relaxed production style. Kirwan wrote 15 of the album's 16 songs, taking the same character-driven approach that he employed in his play writing. He considered many of his songs to be autobiographical or political. "Who Killed Bobby Fuller?" concerns a man trying to solve Bobby Fuller's murder, in order to impress a woman. "The Big Fellah" is about the Irish revolutionary Michael Collins. "Oh Maureen" describes Kirwan's love for a woman who is married. Winds musician Chris Byrne rapped on "Time to Go", about political conflict in Ireland, and a response to criticism the band had received from British periodicals. "Black Rose" details an infatuation for the companion of a friend who is in prison. "Danny Boy" is about a gay Irish immigrant who lands a construction job in Queens. An unlisted 17th track closes the album.

== Critical reception ==
Professional ratings
Review scores
Source	Rating
Alternative Rock	5/10
Chicago Tribune	3/4 stars
Robert Christgau	B−
Deseret News	2.5/4 stars
The Indianapolis Star	3/4 stars
Knoxville News Sentinel	2/5 stars
MusicHound Rock: The Essential Album Guide	2/5 stars
The San Diego Union-Tribune	3/4 stars
Tampa Bay Times	3/5 stars

The Boston Globe stated that "songs spiced with tin whistles and pipes abut cuts with driving drums and raging guitars... It's a sound that ranges from jubilant to mournful". The Philadelphia Inquirer called the album "another glorious blast of Celtic-flavored rock and roll, with dollops of rap and reggae." The Washington Post opined that "Black's sound is so gimmicky: Celtic-rock given an arena-metal swagger and embroidered with Latin, reggae and hip-hop elements designed to reflect the group's Lower East Side residence." Robert Christgau panned Kirwan's vocals, labeling them "soul-as-melodrama rockism with a brogue."

Trouser Press dismissed the album as a "wan imitation of the R&B phase of Dexy's Midnight Runners". The Chicago Tribune concluded that "Kirwan's running commentaries on the Irish immigrant's adjustment to American life fare well from his playwright's sense of dialogue." The Knoxville News Sentinel said that Home of the Brave "goes on entirely too long ... retracing its steps and sounding the same notes." Buddy Seigal, of the Los Angeles Times, listed Home of the Brave as the second best album of 1994. USA Today considered it one of 1994's "overlooked gems".

== Track listing ==
No.	Title	Length
1.	"The Big Fellah"	5:57
2.	"Oh Maureen"	4:34
3.	"Losin' It"	3:50
4.	"Paul Robeson (Born to Be Free)"	5:17
5.	"Road to Ruin"	4:37
6.	"Black Rose"	5:04
7.	"Blood Wedding"	6:08
8.	"Carlita's Revenge"	0:48
9.	"Who Killed Bobby Fuller?"	3:29
10.	"Different Drummer"	3:35
11.	"Danny Boy"	5:20
12.	"Voodoo City"	5:43
13.	"Time to Go"	4:28
14.	"Go Home Paddy"	0:33
15.	"Too Late to Turn Back"	4:56
16.	"American Wake"	5:24
17.	"Cashula"	1:20
Total length:		71:03
