= Green Suede Shoes =

Studio album by Black 47
- Released: 1996
- Genre: Celtic rock, alternative rock
- Label: Tim/Kerr/Mercury
- Producer: Larry Kirwan

Black 47 chronology
Home of the Brave (1994)	Green Suede Shoes (1996)	Live in New York City (1999)

Green Suede Shoes is an album by the American band Black 47, released in 1996. It was a commercial disappointment.

The title track was the album's first single.

== Production ==
The album was produced by frontman Larry Kirwan. It dispensed with some of the stylistic range found on previous albums, focusing more on the Irish aspects of the group's sound; one song is sung in Gaelic.

"Rory" is a tribute to the late Rory Gallagher. "Green Suede Shoes" is a semi-autobiographical song about a rock band; Kirwan later used the title for his autobiography.

== Critical reception ==
Professional ratings
Review scores
Source	Rating
AllMusic	4/5 stars
The Indianapolis Star	3/4 stars
Knoxville News Sentinel	2.5/5 stars
MusicHound Rock: The Essential Album Guide	3/5 stars
USA Today	3/4 stars

The Knoxville News Sentinel called the album "a rehash of the Black 47 shtick," writing that Kirwan "becomes ludicrous with his overdramatic storytelling." The Chicago Tribune wrote that the band "again adorns its rousing tales of political martyrs and working-class louts with Celtic flourishes, reggae rhythms and punchy hard rock." The Santa Fe New Mexican noted that the band "is often put down as a watered-down Pogues," but praised "Forty Deuce" as "a chilling story about modern Irish-American gangsters."

The Indianapolis Star stated that "Black 47 blends more styles of music than perhaps any other band out there today... But it works." The Los Angeles Times thought that "Kirwan brings a theatrical literacy and creativity to the table ... tales deal with the larger than life, the idealistic rather than the hedonistic." USA Today concluded that, "unlike many pop prophets, the band conveys its agenda in keen storytelling and intoxicating tunes."

AllMusic wrote that "the band cooks simply and mightily, goosing the traditional jigs and reels that make up most of its melodic repertoire with R&B, hip-hop and reggae riddims." Dave Thompson called the album "a neglected classic, the Pogues go posh."

== Track listing ==
No.	Title	Length
1.	"Green Suede Shoes"
2.	"My Love Is in New York"
3.	"Bobby Sands MP"
4.	"Change"
5.	"Czechoslovakia"
6.	"Brooklyn Girls"
7.	"Gerty's Farewell"
8.	"Vinegar Hill"
9.	"Sam Hall"
10.	"Walk All the Days"
11.	"Five Points"
12.	"Rory"
13.	"Forty Deuce"
14.	"Mo Bhrón"
15.	"Green Suede Shoes (Acoustic)"
