= St. Francis of Assisi Church (Manhattan) =

Church in Manhattan, New York

General information
- Architectural style: Gothic Revival
- Location: Garment District, Midtown Manhattan, New York City, United States
- Coordinates: 40°44′56″N 73°59′26″W
- Completed: July 17, 1892
- Cost: $60,000
- Client: Roman Catholic Archdiocese of New York

Technical details
- Structural system: Masonry brick

Website
- St. Francis of Assisi Church, Manhattan

The Church of St. Francis of Assisi is a parish church under the authority of the Roman Catholic Archdiocese of New York, and is located at 135–139 West 31st Street, Manhattan, New York City. The parish is staffed by the Order of Friars Minor.

== Parish history ==
The parish was established in 1844 by the Reverend Father Zachary Kunz, O.S.F. (now O.F.M.), an immigrant from the Kingdom of Hungary, who had been the founder and first pastor of the nearby German speaking St. John the Baptist Church in 1840. The problems with St. John's Board of Trustees were so great that the parish had been placed under an interdict (which would last until 1845) by the Bishop of New York, the Right Rev. John McCloskey.

Following this disharmony with the lay Board of Trustees, there and the subsequent interdict, Kunz requested that McCloskey authorize a new parish. This request was granted and the friar soon acquired a plot of land near his first parish. He resigned from St. John's and, with a significant portion of its congregation, founded the Parish of St. Francis of Assisi. The cornerstone of the new church was laid on May 9 of that same year, in a ceremony presided over by Bishop McCloskey.

During the 1860s, under the leadership of the Italian missionary and first Minister Provincial of the Order in the United States, Father Pamfilo of Magliano, O.S.F., a school was opened for the children of the parish. It was run by the Franciscan Sisters of Allegany, whom he had founded. The parish continued to expand and grow, until, by 1890, it was felt that a larger church was needed. Construction of the new church, designed by Henry Erhardt in the Gothic Revival style, was completed in 1892 and it continues as the church of the parish.

At the beginning of the following century, however, the neighborhood of the parish experienced a major change, as the working class population moved out, replaced by the people of the growing theater industry. Accompanying them was a large number of nightclubs and brothels. The area, previously known as Bloomingdale, became known as the notorious Tenderloin District. The friars came to realize that they were now serving a largely transient congregation of shoppers, commuters and tourists, and they sought new ways to provide the services which would best answer the spiritual needs of this population. One innovative development was the practice they introduced of the "Nightworkers Mass", held at midnight. This was to allow workers in trades such as printing and the theater to fulfill their religious obligations. Special permission was later given for a midday service to accommodate daytime workers in the area, becoming the first church in the United States to offer this.

In 1928, one of the largest mosaics in the United States, The Glorification of the Mother of Jesus by Rudolph Margreiter, was installed in the church. Then, when the Great Depression hit in 1929, the friars responded in September 1930 with a breadline to help feed the hungry of the city. The numbers they served daily reached into the thousands during this period. This service is still provided and is the oldest continuously operated breadline in the United States. and is a noted feature of the parish.

The church underwent significant renovations in the late 1950s, with a courtyard added in 1958 and new entrances being opened at the north and side ends of the church in 1961. With further changes in the demographics of the region and congregation, the friars began to offer new services for immigrants and those alienated from the Catholic Church. In 1980, the friars established St. Francis Friends of the Poor, intended to provide housing in the neighborhood for the chronically mentally ill. The apartment buildings which they renovated for this purpose are run as the Saint Francis Residences.

The church's priest Father Mychal Judge was the chaplain to the New York City Fire Department, and on the morning of September 11, 2001, upon hearing of the terrorist attacks at the World Trade Center Twin Towers, he rushed downtown to give solace and the last rites of the Catholic Church. While ministering to a victim, he was struck by falling debris and was killed instantly. His funeral mass was held at St. Francis Church, led by Cardinal Edward Egan and attended by former President Bill Clinton and Senator Hillary Clinton.

By the 21st century, the church also had a Korean-language ministry. Currently, The Church of St. Francis of Assisi also operates an LGBT ministry.

== Gallery ==
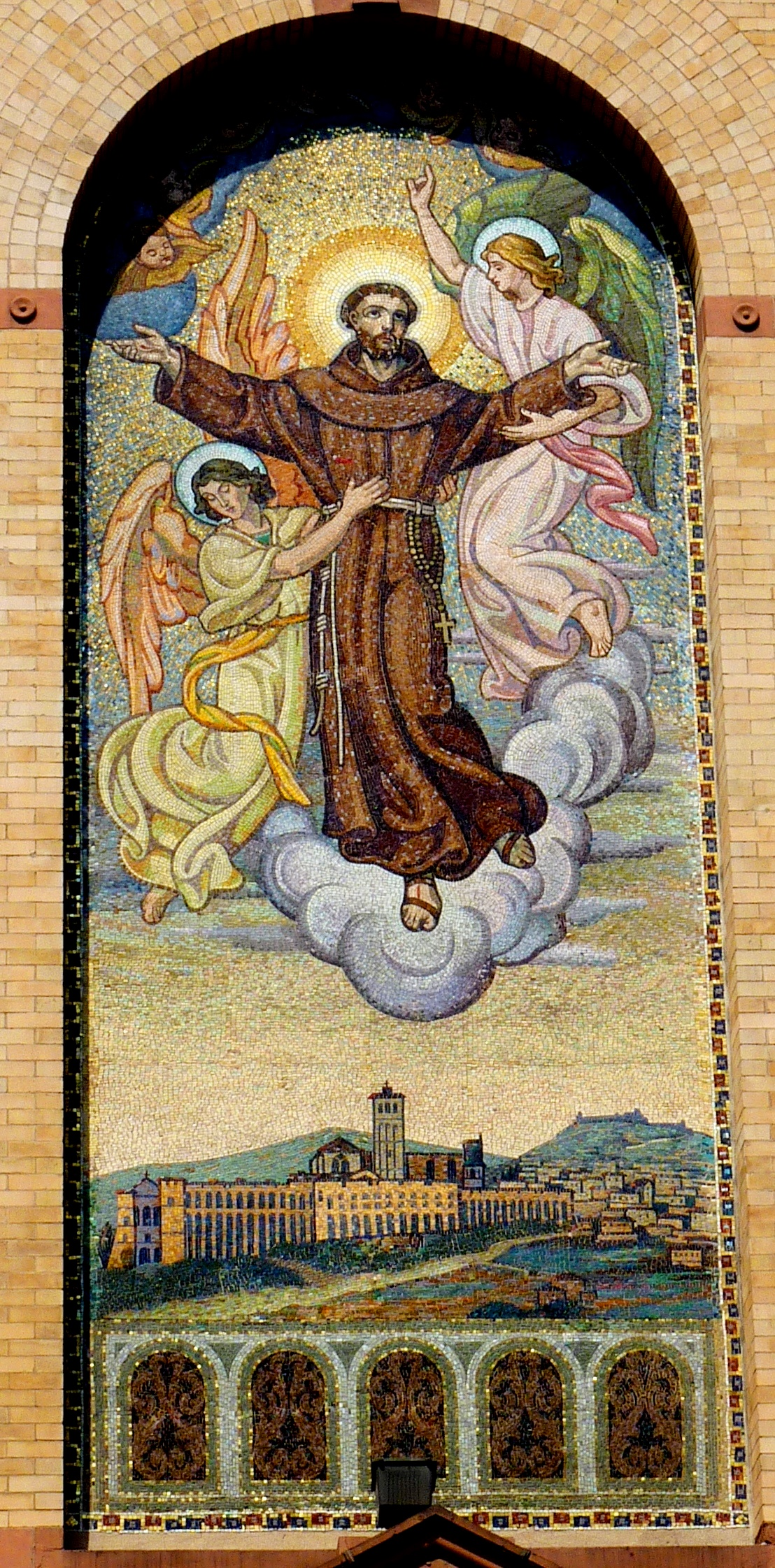
Mosaic

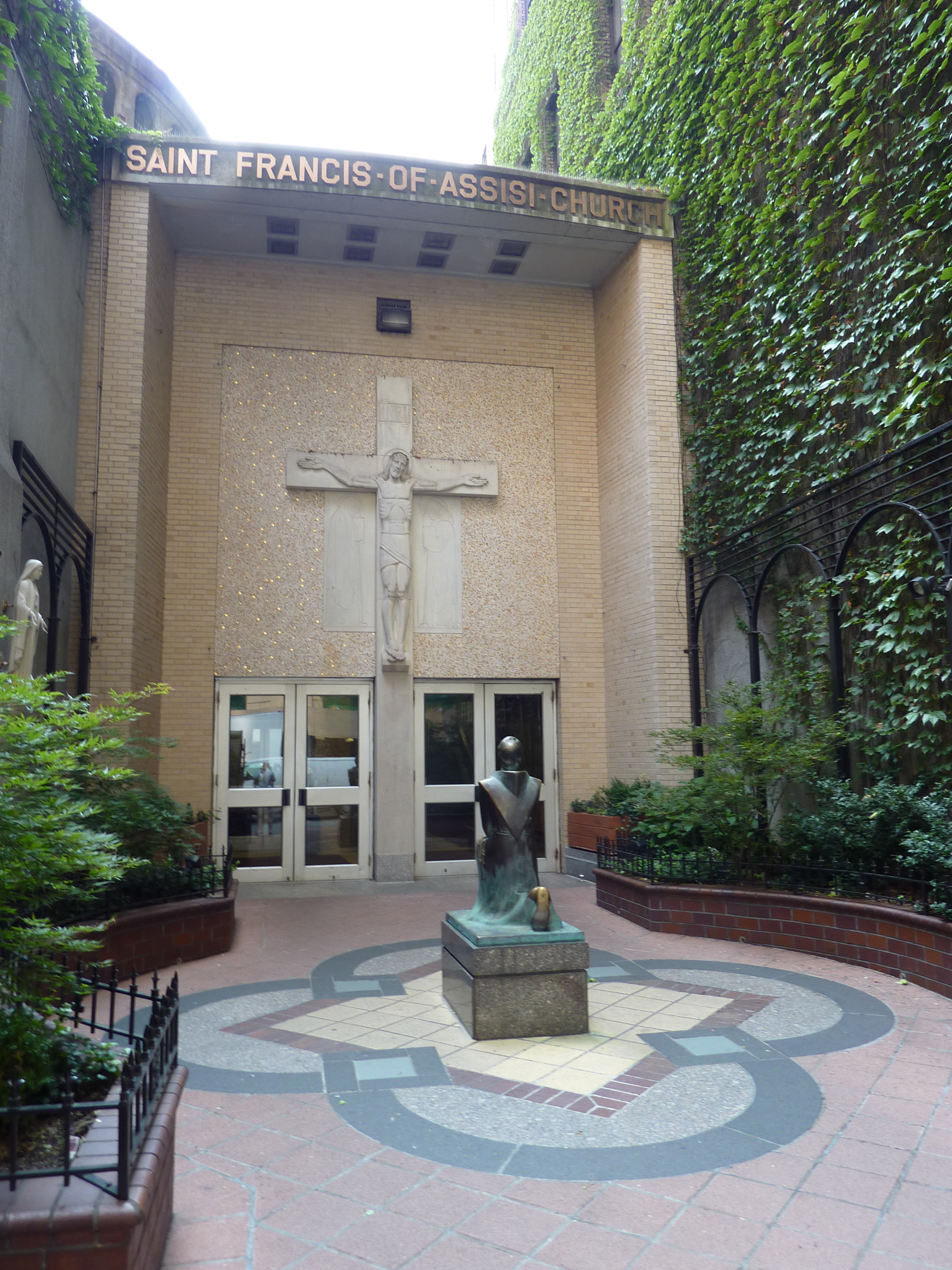
Rear courtyard

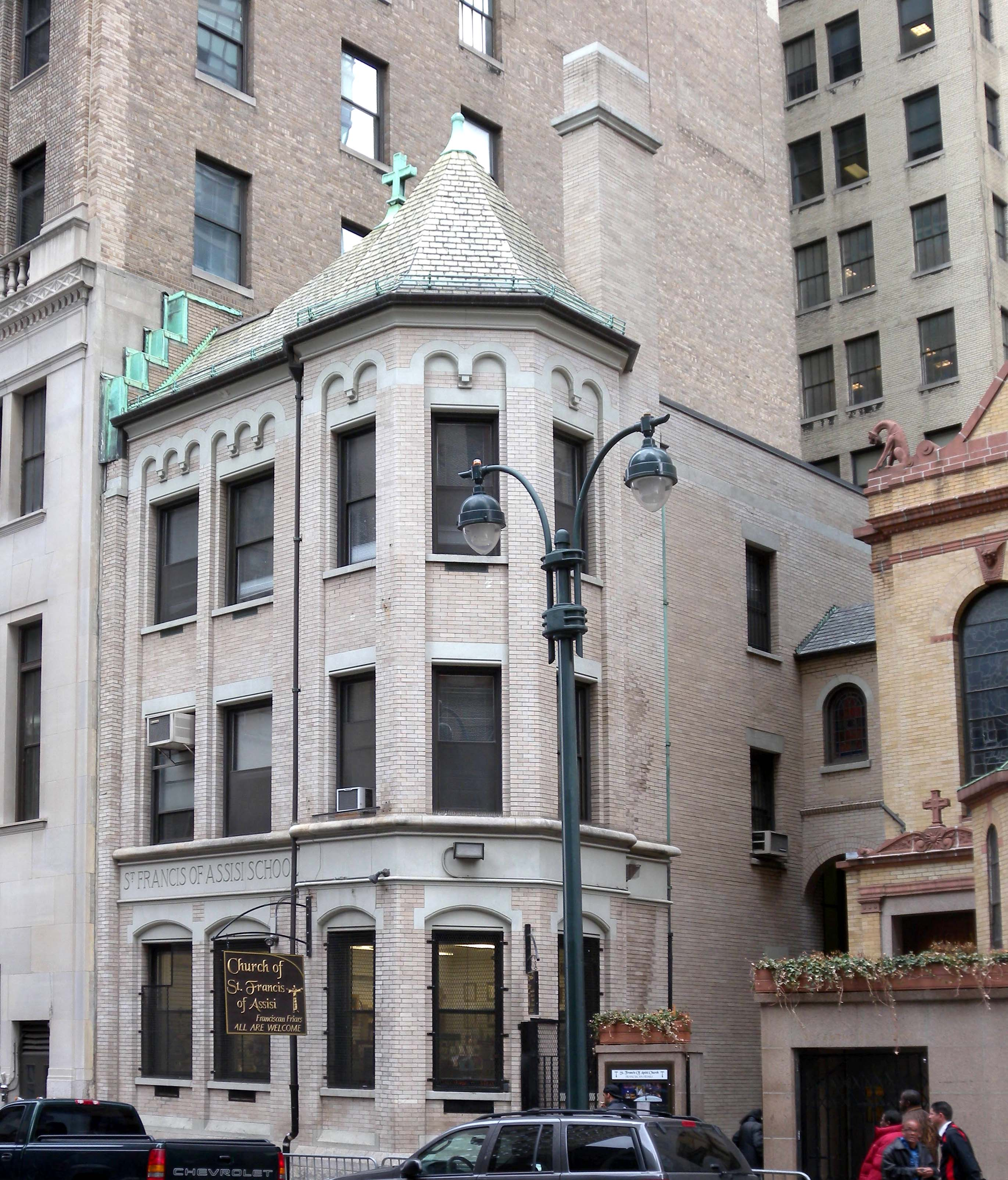
Former school

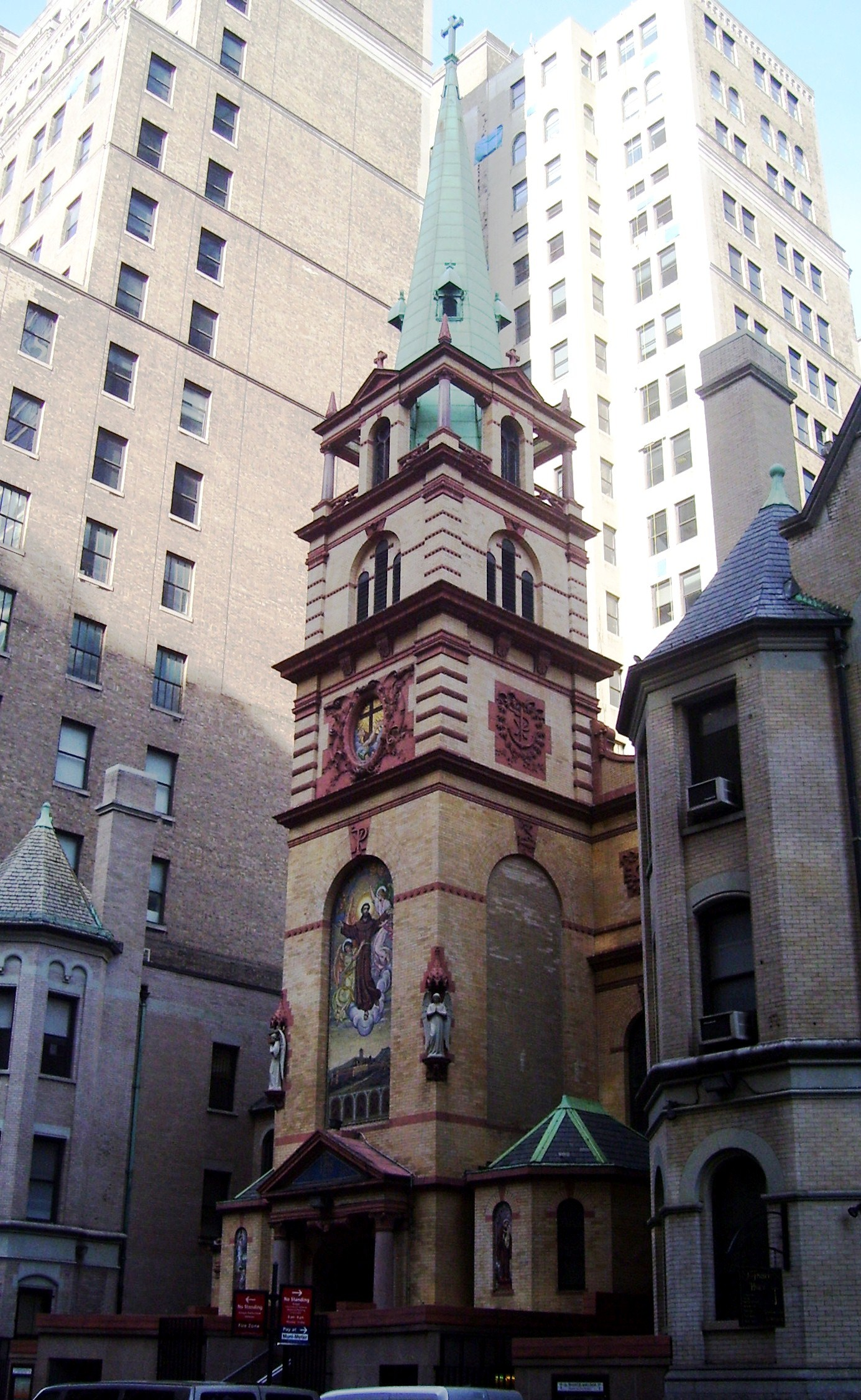
View from the east
