= Barleyjuice =

American musical group

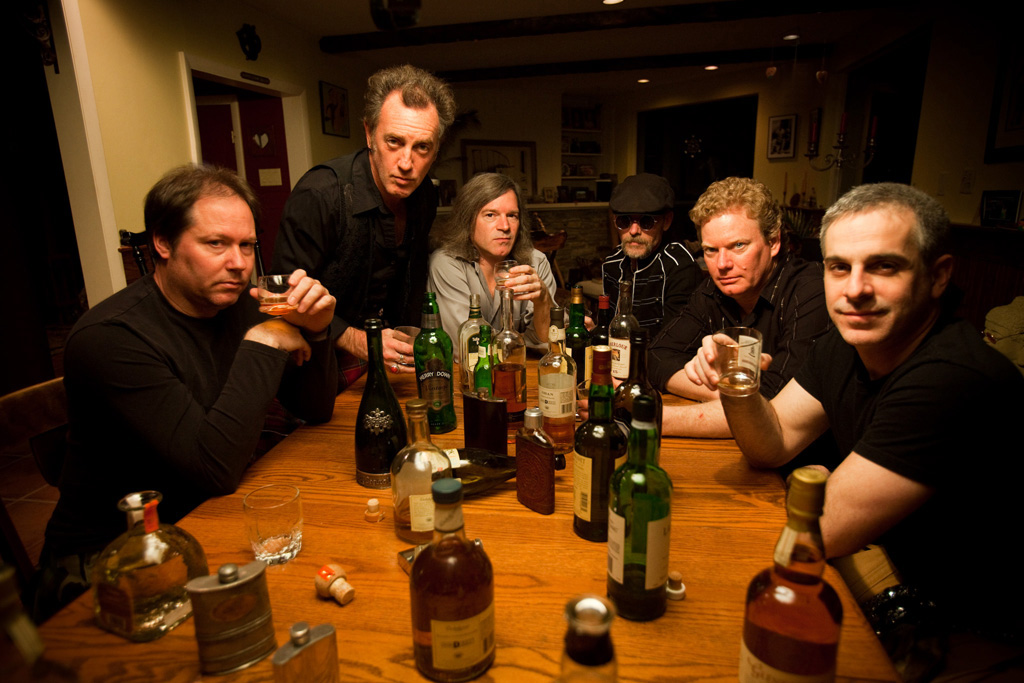
- Barleyjuice in 2010

Background information
- Origin: Philadelphia, Pennsylvania, United States
- Genres: Celtic Rock
- Years active: 1998-present
- Members: Kyf Brewer; Chris Shepherd; Keith Swanson; Tucker Hill; Jim Burkhardt; Johnny Benson
- Past members: Keith Swanson; Alice Marie; John Tracey; Ian Parker; Graham Ford; Jimmy Parkinson; Billy Dominick; Shelley Weiss; Gregor Schroeder; Dennis Schocket; Jeremy Berberian; Keith Barnes; Claire (Remi) Brewer; Eric Worthington
- Website: Official site

Barleyjuice is an American musical group from Philadelphia, Pennsylvania. Formed originally in 1998, the group began as a side project for musicians Keith Swanson and Kyf Brewer, who met as bagpipers in the Loch Rannoch Pipes & Drums of Pineville, Pennsylvania. Barleyjuice's focus was to perform traditional Irish and Scottish songs in a pop/rock fashion, and the band remained a seasonal St. Patrick’s Day project for the first few years of its existence.

== Biography ==
After the release of the band’s first collection of recordings, initially entitled Barleyjuice, and later known as One Shilling, the band became a full-time working group by 2001. The album contains traditional songs of Ireland and Scotland, and one original song, "Donnie Scot," penned by Brewer, which can be heard briefly in the feature film Driven.

In 2003, a second album, Another Round, was released. The album earned the band notoriety with the song, "What’s Up Yours?", an ode to the kilt, which was named Song of the Year by listener vote at Celtic Radio. In 2004, Another Round’s "Jig Set" was also featured in Episode 13 ("Cheer Factor") of the eighth season of King of the Hill. Another song, "Whiskey to the Sea," won additional attention with its inclusion in the complete set of the iTunes Irish Music Essentials Collection. In 2006, Barleyjuice released Six Yanks, their third full-length album. Celtic Radio named Six Yanks Best Celtic Rock CD of 2006.

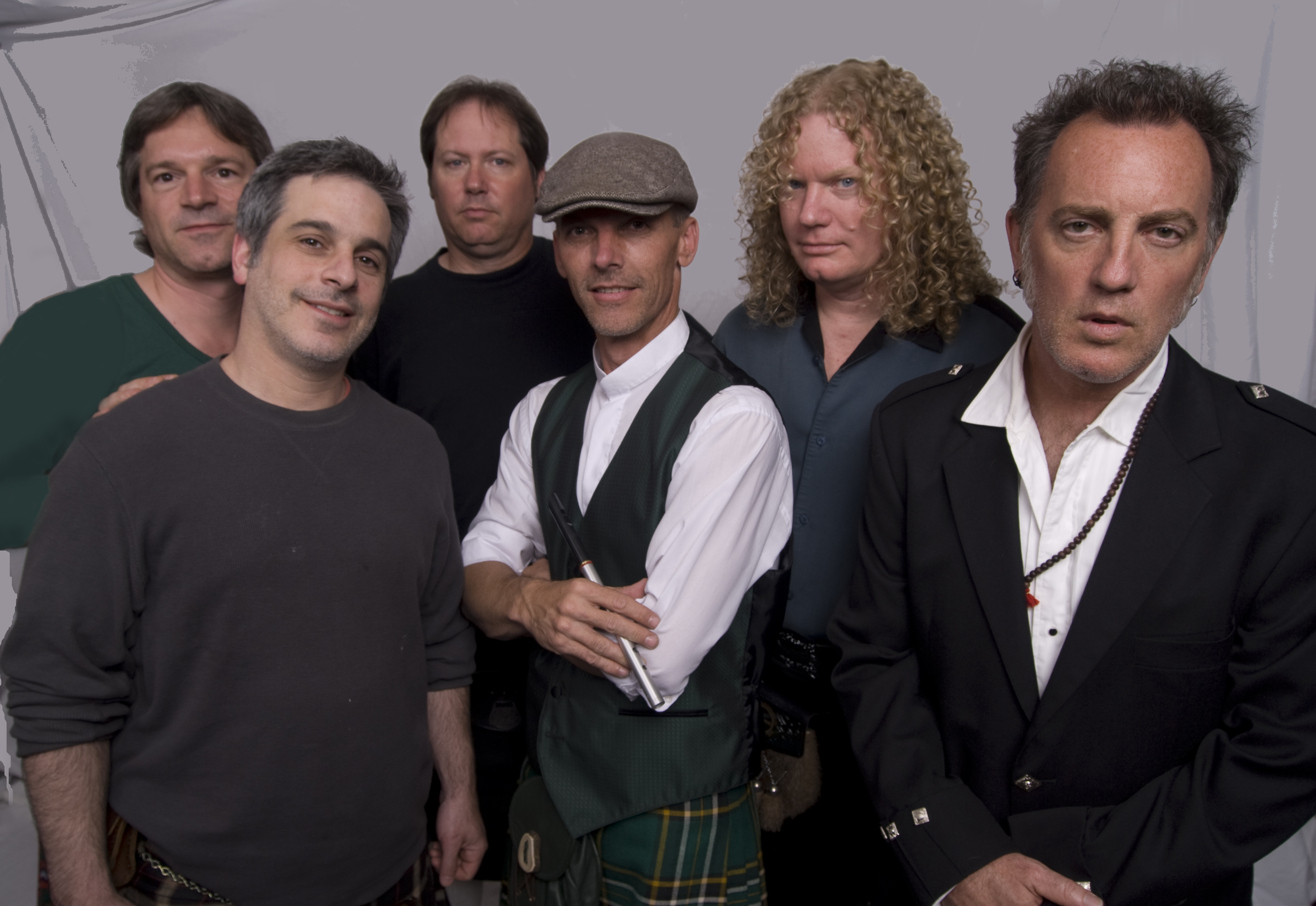
Barleyjuice in 2008

The fourth Barleyjuice album, Bonny Prince Barley, was originally released to the public in 2008, but released officially to radio in 2010, mainly due to the scheduling of an appearance on the QVC television network in the United States in 2008. The band stopped the promotion of Bonny Prince Barley to rush release The Barleyjuice Irish Collection, a double CD, and their biggest seller to date, which included selected tracks from the other four studio albums. Songs from Bonny Prince continued to be crowd favorites at festivals, so the album was re-released in January 2010 with eight new original songs. Chicago’s Irish American News, the Midwest Irish Focus, and radio show “Blarney on the Air” all named Bonny Prince Barley "Celtic Rock Album of the Year" for 2008. In 2008, Paddy Rock Radio listed the album at #6 in their top twenty new albums, while listeners of Celtic Radio voted “Celtic Girl”, from The Barleyjuice Irish Collection, Best Celtic Song of the Year. Barleyjuice began working on their fifth studio album in 2010.

On March 11, 2010, Barleyjuice's "Weekend Irish" was used in an episode of NBC's The Office. The song was also included in the 2013 compilation album Larry Kirwan's Celtic Invasion.

In 2010, the band released their fifth album, Skulduggery Street. Soon after, band members Billy Dominick and Jimmy "Carbomb" Parkinson departed and went their own ways. Replacement violinist, Shelley Weiss, joined the band from early 2011 to 2013.

Barleyjuice's sixth studio album, This Is Why We Can't Have Nice Things, was released in September 2013. Band members at that time were Kyf Brewer, Keith Swanson, Eric Worthington, Shelley Weiss and Gregor Schroeder. Shelley and Gregor departed soon after.

In 2014, Alice O'Quirke and Keith Barnes, fiddle and drums respectively, replaced Weiss and Schroeder. Barnes only played live with the group a handful of times before succumbing to teaching and raising his young children. Dirty Purple drummer Ashley Ferrante performed a string of March Barleyjuice appearances before Barnes officially left the group and was replaced by Brewer's long-time friend and former Ravyns and Crack the Sky drummer, John Tracey.

In 2019, after contributing to Barleyjuice's 7th studio album, The Old Speakeasy, Swanny retired from the band, ending a 20 year run. He was replaced by Chris Shepherd on guitar, mandolin and vocals. Alice Marie and John Tracey also moved on, leaving the fiddling to Billy Dominick and drumming to Claire Brewer, Kyf's youngest offspring. Claire previously played guitar in the band Dirty Purple, with Scotlyn Brewer, CoCo Brewer, Ashley Ferrante and Kieran Corson.

Barleyjuice changed partners again a few years after Covid, with the departure of long-time member Eric Worthington, and Keith Swanson re-joining Kyf on vocals, bouzouki and pipes. Claire, (now Remi), became a part-time member, with Jim Burkhardt taking on the regular drum duties, Tucker Hill joining on bass and vocals, and Johnny Benson on fiddle and vocals. The band remains in this formation to this day.
