= Father Mychal Judge (ship) =

New York Waterway ferry

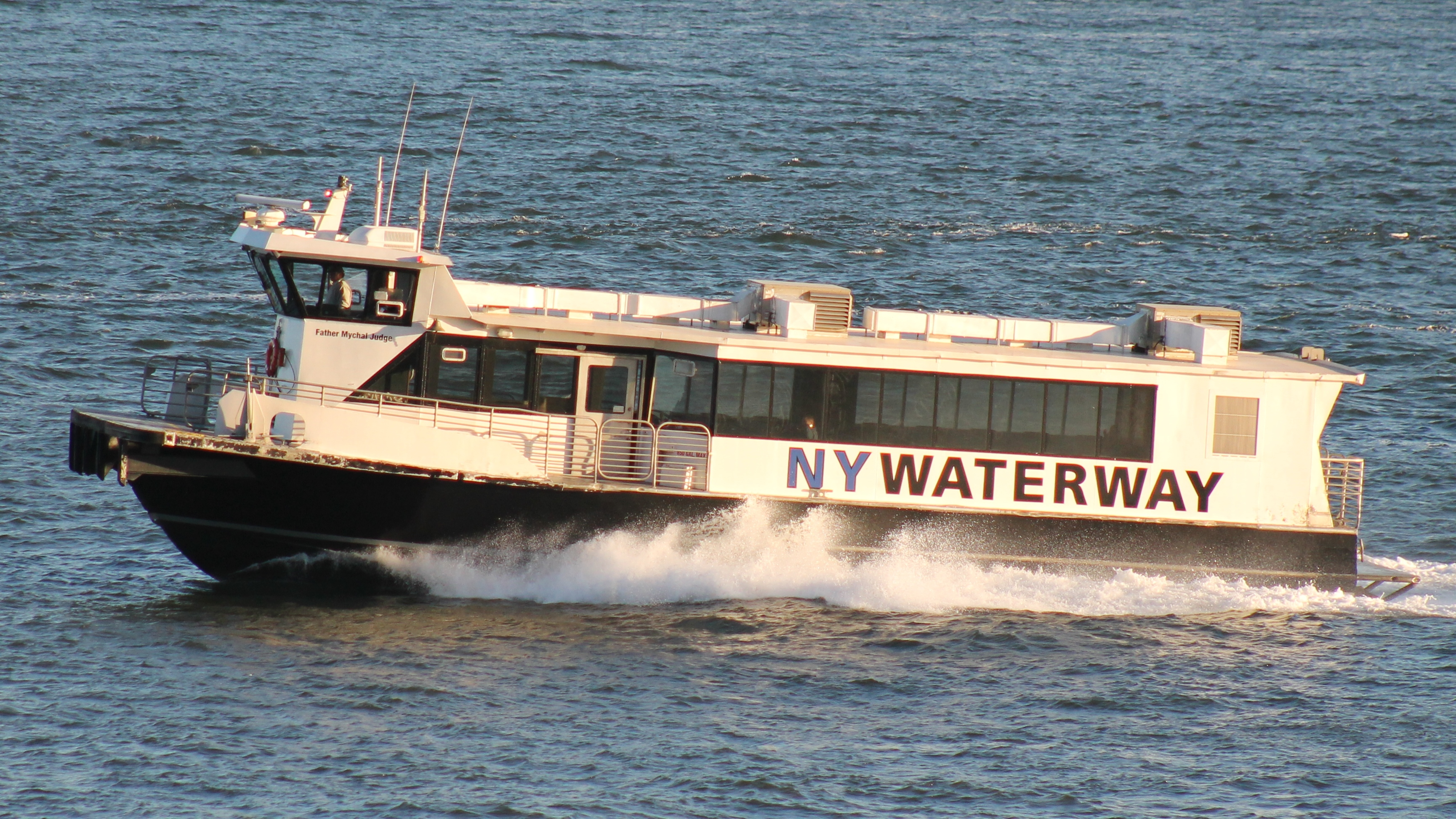
- The Father Mychal Judge underway on 23 October 2015.

History

United States
- Name: Father Mychal Judge
- Namesake: Mychal Judge
- Operator: NY Waterway
- Builder: Allen Marine, Inc., Sitka, Alaska
- Christened: February 20, 2002
- In service: March 2002
- Identification: MMSI number: 366834160; Callsign: WDG3566
- Status: in active service, as of 2012

General characteristics
- Type: Passenger ferry
- Tonnage: 94 GT; 63 NT
- Length: 65 ft (20 m)
- Beam: 29 ft (8.8 m)
- Draft: 3 ft 6 in (1.07 m)
- Propulsion: 4 × 425 hp (317 kW) 6125 Lugger diesel engines; 4 × Hamilton 321 water jets
- Speed: 30 knots (56 km/h; 35 mph)
- Capacity: 110 passengers

Father Mychal Judge is a NY Waterway ferry named in honor of Mychal Judge, a New York City priest who was a victim of al Qaeda's attacks on September 11, 2001.

The vessel was christened in March 2002. The ferry participated in the rescue of passengers of US Airways Flight 1549 that made a successful emergency landing on the Hudson River on 15 January 2009. On April 6, 2012, her captain, Mohamed Gouda, led his crew in a second rescue of the crew of capsized barge Katherine G.
