= Larry Kirwan's Celtic Invasion =

Compilation album by Various artists
- Released: 5 March 2013
- Genre: Celtic, Rock, singer-songwriter, Punk, Irish, Scottish
- Length: 52:12
- Language: English, Gaelic
- Label: Valley Entertainment
- Producer: Larry Kirwan, Jon Birge

Larry Kirwan's Celtic Invasion is a 2013 compilation album of Celtic rock music. The album's tracks were selected by Larry Kirwan: taig, expatriate Irish writer, radio host and musician, most noted as the lead singer for the US rock band, Black 47.

== Track listing ==
No.	Title	Performer(s)	Length
1.	"Weekend Irish"	Barleyjuice	3:36
2.	"Clash of the Ash"	Runrig	3:15
3.	"Uncle Jim"	Black 47	3:41
4.	"You’re So Beautiful"	Pat McGuire	4:11
5.	"Savage Earth Heart (Live from Glastonbury)"	The Waterboys	7:45
6.	"Buile Mo Chroí (The Beat of My Heart)"	John Spillane	3:22
7.	"22"	Celtic Cross	4:15
8.	"Wacko King Hako"	Peatbog Faeries	5:51
9.	"Irish Rover"	Blaggards	3:22
10.	"Sullivan's Lake (The Flood)"	Garrahan's Ghost	2:18
11.	"Meet Me on McLean"	Shilelagh Law	4:00
12.	"Sí Do Mhamó Í"	Hothouse Flowers	6:36
