= Black 47 (band) =

American Celtic rock band

- Origin: United States
- Genres: Celtic punk, Celtic rock, Irish rebel music
- Years active: 1989–2014
- Labels: EMI, Mercury, Shanachie, Tim Kerr Records, United for Opportunity
- Members: Geoffrey Blythe; Thomas Hamlin; Larry Kirwan; Joseph Mulvanerty; Fred Parcells; Joseph "Bearclaw" Burcaw
- Past members: Chris Byrne; Andrew Goodsight; Kevin Jenkins; David Conrad
- Website: black47.com

Black 47 was an American Celtic rock band from New York City, formed in 1989 by Larry Kirwan and Chris Byrne, which derived its name from a traditional term for the summer of 1847, the worst year of the Great Famine in Ireland. Associated with Irish republicanism and left-wing politics, the band was considered a forerunner of Flogging Molly and Dropkick Murphys. The band broke up in 2014.

In 2025, Jeff Mezydlo of Yardbarker included the band in his list of "20 underrated bands from the 1990s who are worth rediscovering".

== History ==
=== Beginnings ===
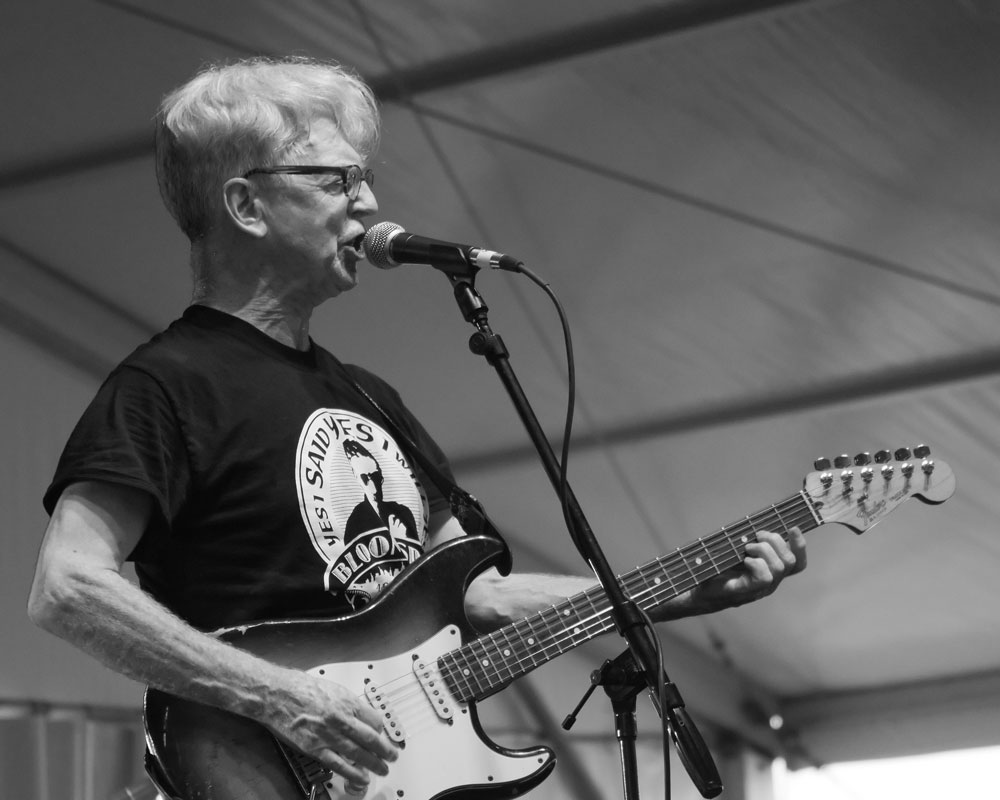
Larry Kirwan at Dublin Irish Festival in 2014

Kirwan originally arrived in New York City from Wexford at age 19, and played in a succession of bands before teaming with Byrne, a Brooklyn policeman, in 1989. The combination of Kirwan's electric guitar and Byrne's use of traditional Irish instruments initially received a poor reception, but a year later, with the addition of new members Geoff Blythe (founding member of Dexy's Midnight Runners), Fred Parcells and Thomas Hamlin, they were playing regularly at Paddy Reilly's bar on Manhattan's East Side. The band began to play three to five nights a week, and garnered praise for both the socio-political lyrics and "off-the-wall" live shows, quickly drawing a fan base from both the political left and right. Kirwan stated in an interview that the band was "formed to be political", with the socialist lyrics attracting one half of the political spectrum, and the songs of the day-to-day life in America attracting traditionally right-leaning "cops, firemen and construction workers."

=== Breakout ===
The band got their first big break when their debut release, Home of the Brave, launched as a cassette at a St. Patrick's day gig at Reilly's in 1990. It was heard by Frank Murray, manager of The Pogues, who signed them to his newly launched label. They went on to open for The Pogues at Brixton Academy in December of the same year, and following the collapse of Murray's label the band released an eponymous independent album in 1991, which brought them to the attention of EMI. They went into the studio with Ric Ocasek of The Cars, where they re-recorded parts of their self-titled album for the 1992 release of Fire of Freedom, which was described as "the most fun you can squeeze out of a five-inch disc." and drew comparisons with Kevin Rowland and Bruce Springsteen. Black 47 gained access to a significantly wider audience when "Funky Céilí (Bridie's Song)", a track from Fire of Freedom gained extended air-play on music channel MTV, becoming the band's breakout single. The song was praised for the use of a traditional jig, riotous conclusion and as "a knockout example of how Irish music can rock." A second song from the album, "Black 47", caused a stir amongst older fans of Irish music who had maintained close emotional ties to their ancestors who lived during the famine, traditionally a subject rarely addressed in song. The band followed up with Home of the Brave in 1994 with Jerry Harrison serving as producer, and a move from EMI to Mercury Records in 1996 followed with the release of Green Suede Shoes.

Throughout the late 1990s the band continued to perform around 150 nights a year both on tour and at Reilly's, but was plagued by a series of tragedies behind the scenes, and their political stance on affairs in Northern Ireland resulted in UK record companies being unwilling to support or promote the band, restricting a potentially lucrative market. At the 1996 St. Patrick's Day gig a very inebriated 22-year-old off-duty police officer, Christopher Gargan, used his department issued 9mm pistol to shoot himself in the head and the single bullet also injured Sharon Callahan-Wormworth and June Anderson, tour manager Nico Wormworth's wife and Kirwan's wife, respectively. In 1997 one of the band's sound engineers, Johnny Byrne (immortalised in the band's single "Johnny Byrne's Jig"), died from injuries suffered after falling from his apartment window in New York City not long after recording an album of children's songs with Kirwan. The late 1990s also saw band member Thomas Hamlin's apartment burn down, Kevin Jenkins retire after a car crash whilst on tour and John Murphy, a close friend of the band, die after falling into a coma after a motorcycle accident. These events are reflected upon in "Those Saints", a song on the Trouble in the Land album, released in 2000. 2000 also saw the release of the band's first compilation album to mark their tenth anniversary, Ten Bloody Years, and the departure of Byrne who amicably left the band to concentrate on his solo project, Seanchai and the Unity Squad.

=== Post Byrne ===
Black 47 went on an unofficial recording hiatus, although they maintained their live performances, influenced as much by the events of 9/11 as the departure of Byrne. The release of New York Town in 2004 reflected the city before and after the attacks, where a number of Black 47 fans, such as FDNY chaplain Mychal Judge, honoured in the song "Mychal", were casualties. Post-9/11 Black 47 had started to play regularly at Connolly's Pub in midtown Manhattan, playing shows Kirwan described as intense in order to allow fans who had lost loved ones an outlet for their emotions, and this was channelled into making the album. New York Town was a critical success, drawing parallels to Joyce's Dubliners due to it being a series of short, unrelated stories centered around New York City, and Kirwan was praised for painting a picture of the everyday life of New Yorkers, although the appearance of guest singers such as David Johansen of the New York Dolls and Christine Ohlman was noted for highlighting the weakness in Kirwan's own voice.

Following the release of Elvis Murphys Green Suede Shoes, a companion to Kirwan's memoir, Green Suede Shoes - An Irish-American Odyssey in 2005, the band released a second greatest hits album, Bittersweet Sixteen in 2006 to celebrate sixteen years. Elvis Murphy was generally well received, as despite the lyrics at times having literary 'problems' it was considered challenging yet enjoyable and for making "real emotional sense" and touching both the heart and soul. Bittersweet Sixteen was praised for being both a great introduction to the band and a treasure for seasoned fans, containing rare tracks such as the original version of "Funky Céilí".

Prior to the invasion of Iraq in 2003, the band became outspoken critics of the potential war, speaking out regularly at gigs. When the invasion was announced they were playing live, and due to the political mix the band attracted some fans begun to scuffle and walk out in response to the left-leaning lyrics of the anti-war songs. They released a collection of such songs in 2008 on an album simply titled Iraq. Inspiration for the lyrics came from Kirwan's communication with fans serving on the front line, as a significant demographic of the fanbase is young men who enlist to fund their futures. Kirwan called the album a response to the war being forgotten about, as stories moved away from the front pages, drawing similarities in the way violence in Northern Ireland became 'acceptable'.

The band returned to drawing from a wider ranger of subjects with their 2010 album Bankers and Gangsters. It was noted that this album, unsurprisingly, was less political than its predecessor, and was also criticised for returning to the safe haven and not bringing anything new to the band's discography. However the album was generally well received, with praise going to the high standard of Kirwan's storytelling ability so far into the band's lifetime as well as the "rollicking spirit" of the bands. Kirwan relates his noted ability and passion in biographical songs such as "Bobby Sands MP" to his time spent as a playwright, likening his performance singing them to method acting. The album has also been considered one of the band's best, referencing the "sharp social commentary and genre-bending sounds."

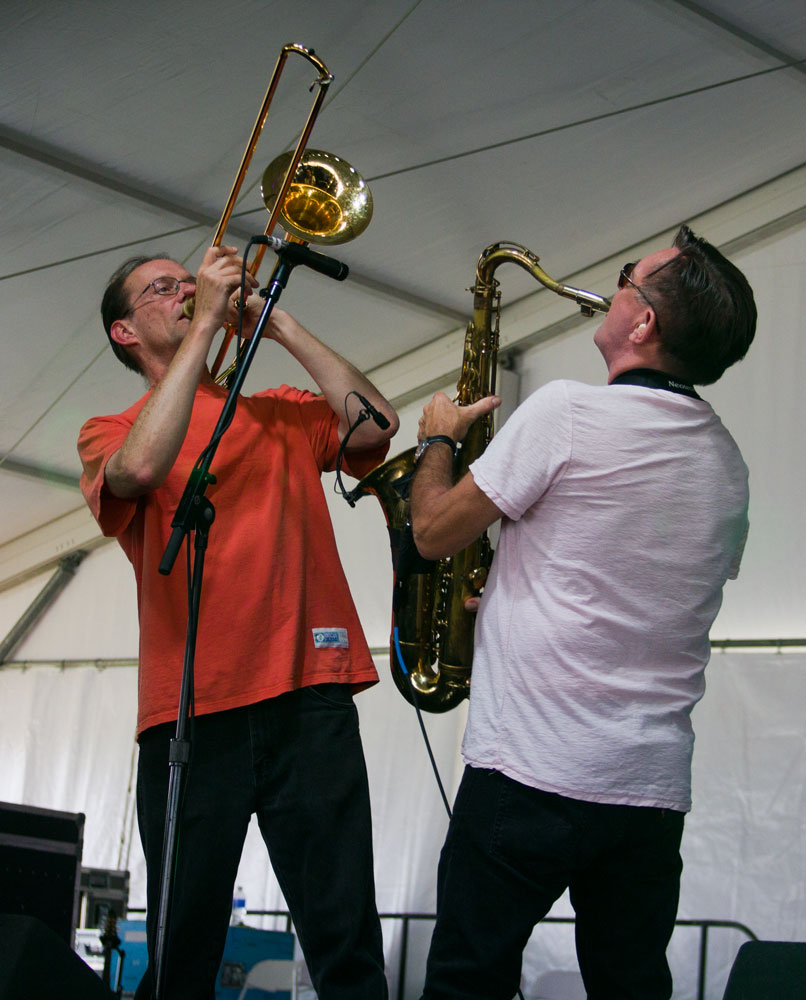
Fred Parcells on trombone and Geoffrey Blythe on saxophone, at Dublin Irish Festival in 2014

== Politics ==
A 1993 Time magazine article on Irish rock in America said it was "the proletariat passion of Black 47's songs that make the group stand out."

=== Irish Republicanism ===
Black 47 were associated with Irish republicanism throughout their career, both in name and in content. Their bandname referenced "Black '47", the worst year of the Great Famine, and many of their songs engaged directly with Ireland’s history, paying tribute to people such as James Connolly and Bobby Sands, and recounting uprisings in tracks like “Vinegar Hill” and “Home of the Brave”. The band’s sound (a fusion of rock, reggae, and traditional Irish music) was grounded in the Irish-American experience and frequently tackled themes of identity, class struggle, diaspora, and historical memory. Frontman Larry Kirwan, originally from Wexford, often cited his Irish republican upbringing as a major influence on the band’s political outlook. For Kirwan, embedding politics in music was not just a creative decision but a core part of Black 47’s purpose, even at the expense of broader commercial success.

Kirwan was outspoken about British colonial policy in Ireland, once referring to it as an "attempt at racial cleansing". While he stopped short of blaming Britain for deliberately engineering the famine, he condemned its refusal to alter the economic system that allowed millions to die or emigrate. The band’s overt political messaging drew criticism from more neutral audiences and limited their promotion in the United Kingdom. Songs like “James Connolly”, “Bobby Sands MP”, and “Vinegar Hill” made their allegiances clear and led to the group being described as "the musical wing of the IRA".

=== Iraq War ===
On top of the Iraq album, Kirwan noted that the war was one which "the working class is fighting". He also stated that politicians wasted an opportunity (after 9/11) to change the world for the better, placing most blame on the shoulders of then-president Bush Kirwan argued that had there been a Churchill-esque leader then America would have taken the opportunity to rid themselves of dependence on foreign oil, and change the way America communicated with the rest of the world. He also criticised Bush for using the memory of the victims of 9/11 to justify war as the biggest tragedy that came out of the event.

=== Concert recording ===
Kirwan actively encourages the videotaping, recording and photography of Black 47's live shows, citing that no two shows are the same and it's good to have a record of it. The band's official website has also encouraged US soldiers posted in the Middle East to pass around bootlegged copies of albums.

== Criticism ==
Black 47 band has been criticized as most members only have a tenuous link to Ireland. Ed Power of The Guardian noting their minuscule connection with Ireland as being ‘sweet feck all to do with Oscar Wilde, Christy Ring or Samuel Beckett.’

They have been described as 'the musical wing of the IRA’, which was a paramilitary organisation in Northern Ireland and was designated a terrorist organisation in the United Kingdom and an illegal organisation in the Republic of Ireland. The IRA have been held responsible for the killing of 1,705 people during The Troubles, including many civilians.

== Discography ==
Year	Title	Notes
1989	Home of the Brave/Live in London	
1991	Black 47	
1992	Black 47	EP
1993	Fire of Freedom	
1994	Home of the Brave	
1996	Green Suede Shoes	
1999	Live in New York City	
2000	Ten Bloody Years of Black 47	
2000	Trouble in the Land	A 2010 poll by IrishCentral.com voted this the best Irish American album of the previous decade, from a shortlist of five.
2001	On Fire	Live
2004	New York Town	
2005	Elvis Murphy's Green Suede Shoes	
2006	Bittersweet Sixteen	Popular songs & rarities collection
2008	Iraq	
2010	Bankers and Gangsters	
2011	A Funky Ceili	
2013	Larry Kirwan's Celtic Invasion	Various artists compilation featuring Uncle Jim, co-produced by Larry Kirwan
2014	Last Call	released 4 March 2014
2014	Rise Up: The Political Songs	Compilation

== Band members ==
- Geoffrey Blythe: tenor saxophone, soprano saxophone, clarinet
- Joseph "Bearclaw" Burcaw : bass, vocals
- Thomas Hamlin : drums, percussion
- Larry Kirwan : lead vocals, guitar
- Joseph Mulvanerty : uilleann pipes, flute, bodhrán
- Fred Parcells : trombone, tin whistle

Past members

- Chris Byrne : uilleann pipes, tin whistle, bodhrán and vocals (1989–2000)
- David Conrad : bass (1991–1993)
- Erik Boyd : bass (1993-1994)
- Kevin Jenkins : bass (1994–1995)
- Andrew Goodsight: bass (1995–2006)
