= Pamfilo of Magliano =

Italian Franciscan friar

The Very Reverend Father Pamfilo of Magliano, O.S.F.
- Custos Provincial, Custody of the Immaculate Conception O.F.M.
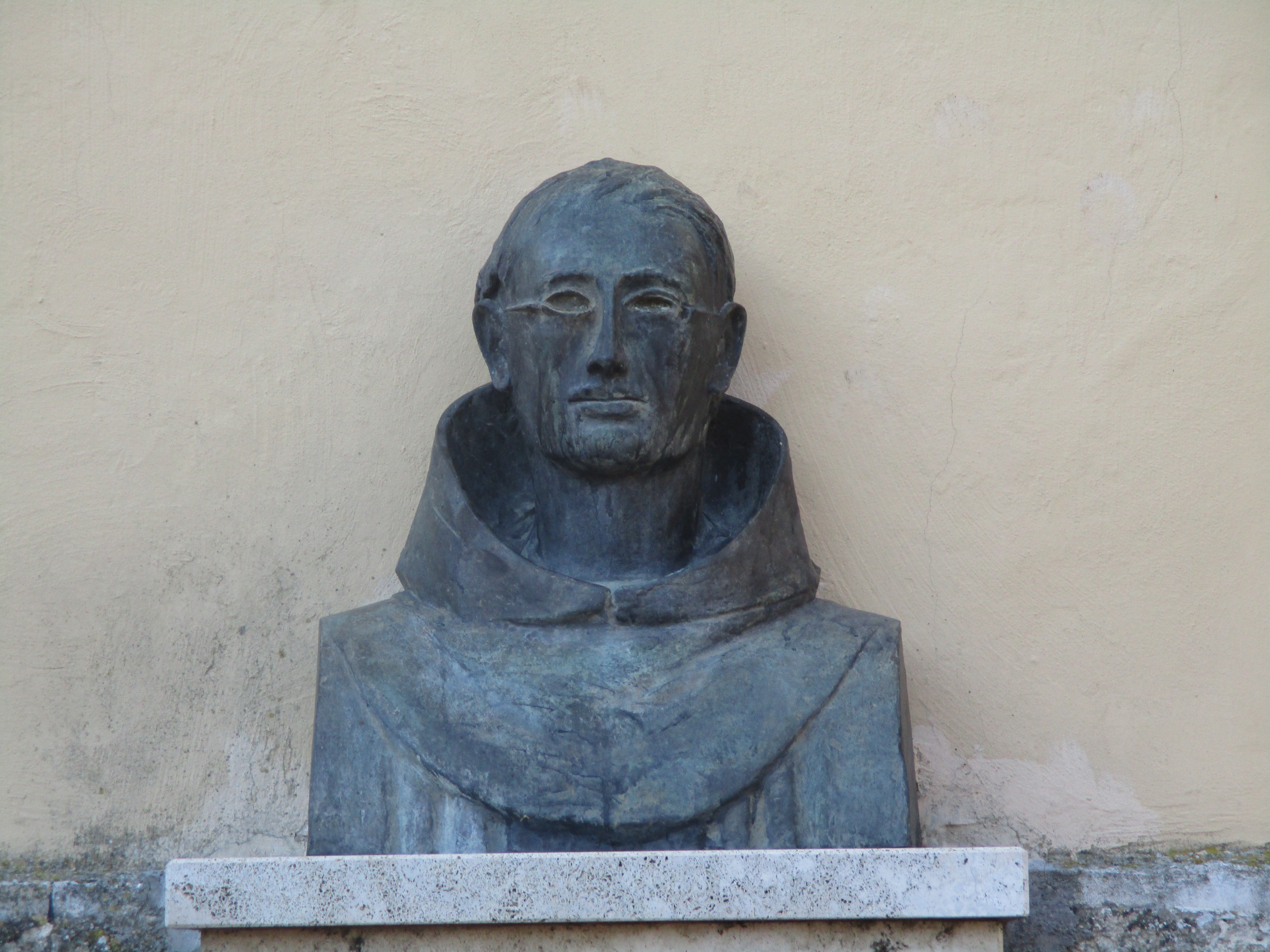
- Other post: 1st President of St. Bonaventure University

Orders
- Ordination: 18 December 1846

Personal details
- Born: Giovanni Paulo Pietrobattista; 22 April 1824 Magliano de' Marsi, L'Aquila; Kingdom of the Two Sicilies
- Died: 15 November 1876 (aged 52) San Pietro in Montorio, Rome, Kingdom of Italy
- Buried: Cemetery of Verano; Rome, Italy
- Denomination: Roman Catholic

Pamfilo of Magliano, O.S.F. (now O.F.M.), was an Italian Franciscan friar, who went to the United States in 1855 to help establish the Order there. He was responsible for the establishment of major institutions of the Order in the Northeastern United States. He founded two religious institutes of Sisters of the Third Order Regular of St. Francis.

== Early career ==
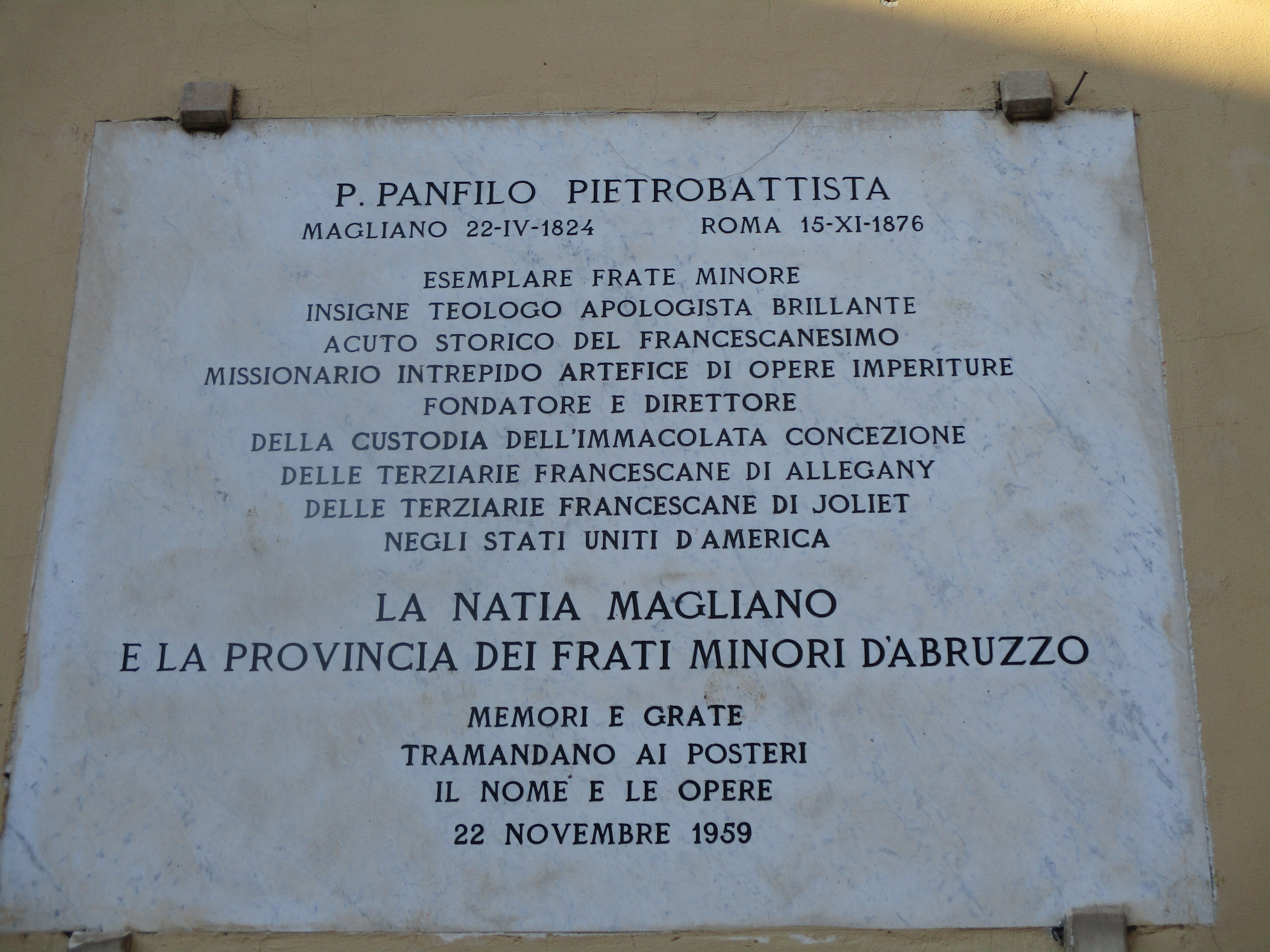
Plaque in Magliano de' Marsi

Little is known of Pamfilo's life prior to his admission into the Franciscan Order, other than that he was born Giovanni Paulo Pietrobattista on 22 April 1824, in the village of Magliano de' Marsi, which is in the Province of L'Aquila in the mountainous Abruzzo region of central Italy. At that time it was under the rule of the Kingdom of the Two Sicilies.

Pietrobattista grew up in a parish administered by the Friars Minor and frequented their church. When he was of age, on 5 July 1839, he entered the Province of St. Bernadine of Siena, based in Urbino, taking the name Pamfilo (possibly after St. Pamphilus of Sulmona). He was ordained a Catholic priest in Urbino on 18 December 1846. After his ordination, he was given Chairs in both philosophy and theology at the Order's friary there. He taught there until October 1852, when he was sent to Rome to serve as secretary to the Visitor General of the Order. On 8 December of that year, he began to teach at one of the Order's institutions of higher learning, the Irish College of St. Isidore, where he was able to perfect his command of English. He remained in this post until 4 January 1855.

== Foundations in America ==
At this point, in response to an invitation by John Timon, Bishop of Buffalo, seeking help in providing pastoral care to the European immigrants moving in large numbers to his territory, Pamfilo was sent to the United States by the Minister General of the Order of Friars Minor to establish their presence in the country. The friars received the personal blessing of Pope Pius IX on 22 May 1855, before their departure. They set sail for New York City, where they arrived on 20 June. He proceeded to lead his small band of friars in establishing a friary and an academy in Allegany, NY in Western New York. By 1859, he was one of 14 founding friars who established St. Bonaventure College, which was to become St. Bonaventure University, and he was appointed as its first President.

The academy drew young men who felt a religious calling to the Order, and with time Pamfilo was able to establish several communities of friars. When the sufficient number of communities with professed friars had been established, in 1861, with the permission of the Holy See, the Minister General established a Custody of the Order, named Immaculate Conception, for the recently defined dogma of the Church. Pamfilo was named Custos, the first regional Superior of the Order in the United States, and thus a significant step in the rooting of the Order in the nation.

Under his leadership, the friars assumed the administration of two parishes in New York City, St. Francis of Assisi and St. Anthony of Padua in 1866. Both of these are still served by Franciscan friars.

== Father Founder ==
In his position as Custos, Father Pamfilo was effectively the leader of the Franciscan Order in the nation in its various branches. In addition to the establishment of the friars, he also worked to support and guide the communities of women of the Third Order of St. Francis, who were springing up around the country to help educate the children of the Catholic immigrants flooding into the nation. To this end, in 1857 he recruited Mary Jane Todd to commit herself as a Sister of the Third Order Regular of St. Francis. He gave her the religious habit and professed her as a member of the Order. When other women came to join her, he acted as the Superior General of the new foundation, until they were able to establish themselves as an independent congregation, known as the Franciscan Sisters of Allegany. They worked to educate young women of western New York State. From there, their work has spread throughout the world.

Likewise, in 1863 Magliano helped in the foundation of the Franciscan Sisters of Joliet, Illinois. He gave official approval to their nascent community and he himself gave the religious habit to their first novice.

== Return to Italy ==
In 1867, Pamfilo was summoned back to Italy. He later learned that this was due to misinformation given to the Minister General by one of the friars. By then, however, the damage was done, as he had already been replaced as Custos. He felt his departure greatly, for his letters indicate how much he had come to love his adopted country. Yet he never showed any bitterness at his treatment in his journals. In a Christmas message to one of the American friars from his new home in Rome, he wrote:

My health, thank God, continues to be good. I hope and pray that you and all the friars there are enjoying the best of health; and I wish each and everyone of you, a Merry Christmas and a Happy New Year. Your affectionate confrere, Pamfilo.

Pamfilo devoted the remaining years of his life to writing and the publication of significant works, the most important being his Storia Compendiosa di San Francesco e dei Francescani in two substantial volumes. He died before the third volume could be completed.

Pamfilo had returned to an Italy in the midst of the struggle for its unification. Several times, the community in which he lived had to flee the armies of Garibaldi. Finally he was able to take refuge in Rome at the friary attached to the Church of San Pietro in Montorio, traditional site of the crucifixion of Saint Peter. It was there that Pamfilo died on 15 November 1876, at the age of 52. He was buried in the Cemetery of Verano in Rome.
