= Dublin Irish Festival =

Annual festival in Dublin, Ohio, United States

Coordinates: 40°06′21″N 83°08′21″W

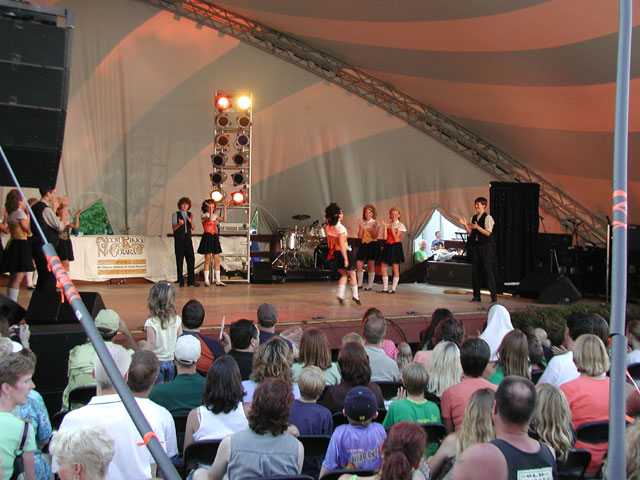
- Dublin Irish Festival - 2006
- Dates: First weekend in August
- Locations: Dublin, Ohio, US
- Years active: 1988–2019, 2021–
- Website: http://www.dublinirishfestival.org

The Dublin Irish Festival is an annual music and cultural festival held in Dublin, Ohio, US. It takes place during the first weekend of August, attracting over 100,000 visitors to eight entertainment stages on 29 acres (120,000 m^{2}) in and beyond Coffman Park.

The Columbus Feis, Irish dance competition, occurs every year at the same time as the Irish Festival.

== Awards ==
In 2006, the Festival was awarded an EXPY from Experience Columbus. The 2007 Festival was recognized by the International Festivals and Events Association with the Silver Grand Pinnacle Award, recognizing top events in the world. It was also selected by the American Bus Association as one of the top 100 events for 2009. The 2011 Irish Festival was honored with 7 International Festival and Events Association Haas & Wilkerson Pinnacle Awards. The Festival received gold in Best New Single Sponsor Program, Best TV Promotion Ad Spot and Best Merchandise. Silver in Best Social Media Site and Best T-shirt Design. Also the Festival took bronze in Best Individual Sponsorship Program and Best Single Magazine Display Ad.
