= Orthodox-Catholic Church of America =

International Christian association

- Classification: Christian syncretic (Eastern Orthodox/Oriental Orthodox/Western Catholic)
- Orientation: Western Christianity (Latin Rite)/Eastern Christianity (Byzantine Rite/East Syriac Rite)
- Polity: Episcopal
- Primate: Vacant
- Associations: Communion with Catholic Apostolic Church in North America
- Region: United States, Canada, Mexico, Brazil, Cameroon, Australia
- Language: English
- Origin: 1892; United States
- Separated from: Syriac Orthodox Church (1910)

The Orthodox-Catholic Church of America (OCCA) is an independent and self-governing Christian syncretic (Eastern Orthodox/Oriental Orthodox/Western Catholic) jurisdiction based in the United States (including the territory of the US Virgin Islands), with clergy also in Canada, Mexico, Brazil, Africa, and Australia.

The church celebrates predominantly a version of the Western Liturgy (Roman Rite) though some priests also celebrate the Divine Liturgy of St. John Chrysostom (Byzantine Rite) or the Liturgy of Addai and Mari (East Syriac Rite). The OCCA is not associated with the Eastern Orthodox churches whose bishops are members of the Assembly of Canonical Orthodox Bishops of the United States of America.

The OCCA is governed by a synod of diocesan bishops, currently six. The ecclesial purpose of the OCCA is to be a loving, welcoming and inclusive community where all people can attain the fundamental goal of the Orthodox Catholic faith, summed up by St. Maximos the Confessor (580-662 AD) as "All that God is, except for an identity in being, one becomes when one is deified by grace". This is effected through the worship of God in the Holy Trinity and the proclamation and living of the faith as taught in Holy Scripture, the Apostolic tradition, and the first three ecumenical councils of the Ancient church. The church recognizes sacramental ordination of women to the clergy and homosexual marriage.

The OCCA is one of a number of churches practicing Orthodoxy in an American setting. Its worship and beliefs are influenced by Oriental, Eastern, and Western traditions, and considers itself to be one "self-governing" church out of many in the Orthodox tradition.

== Clergy and sacraments ==
The clergy ordained by the OCCA operate their ministries independently from the OCCA. According to a statement on the OCCA website:

The relationship between the Church and the congregation, consisting of its priests, deacons and members, is based upon their shared beliefs. There is no legal relationship between the Church and the congregation.

== History ==
The Orthodox-Catholic Church of America was established in the United States in 1892 under the mandate of the Syriac Orthodox Patriarch, Ignatius Peter IV. The founding archbishop, Joseph René Vilatte (ordained as Mar Timotheus), had been ordained as a priest by Bishop Ernst Herzog of the Old Catholic Church in Bern, Switzerland on June 7, 1885. Working in the Great Lakes area, predominantly in Wisconsin, Vilatte sought to bring about the return of a Western Rite of Orthodoxy. Fr. Vilatte received both support and opposition in this attempt, but eventually he was consecrated as archbishop for North America, in Colombo, Ceylon (now Sri Lanka) by Archbishop Francis Alvarez with the permission of the Syriac Orthodox Patriarch of Antioch in 1892.

== Saints ==
The OCCA has canonized two saints: St. David Edwards, a former priest of the OCCA, and St. Fr. Mychal Judge, O.F.M., a Catholic Franciscan friar and firehouse chaplain who was the first identified victim of the September 11 attacks in 2001.

== See also ==
- Eastern Orthodox Church
- List of Christian denominations
- Oriental Orthodoxy
- Western Rite Orthodoxy
