= Larry Kirwan =

Background information
- Born: 1954 (age 71–72); Wexford, Ireland
- Instrument: Vocals
- Member of: Larry Kirwan & Co.
- Formerly of: Black 47

Larry Kirwan (born 1954 in Wexford) is an Irish-American writer and musician, most noted as the lead singer for the rock band Black 47 and conceiver/co-writer of Paradise Square, the Broadway Musical for which he received a Tony Award nomination.

== Biography ==
Prior to Black 47, Kirwan and fellow Wexfordian Pierce Turner were the house band in Malachy McCourt's Bells of Hell in Greenwich Village. Their music was a blend of folk, trad, progressive rock, Celtic rock and punk. Turner & Kirwan of Wexford was one of the few groups banned from CBGB's. In the words of Hilly Kristal they were "too demonic". They then led the new wave band Major Thinkers for some years. Their song Avenue B (is the place to be) became a radio hit whereupon they were signed to Epic-Portrait Records. They recorded an album: Terrible Beauty, that was never released and after a performance in Irving Plaza on St. Patrick's Day 1985 they disbanded.

In 2013, he co-produced a various artists compilation for Valley Entertainment titled Larry Kirwan's Celtic Invasion.

He is an occasional footballer, and generally as a striker with his left foot.

== Criticism ==
His band has been described as 'the musical wing of the IRA', which was a paramilitary organisation in Northern Ireland and was designated a terrorist organisation in the United Kingdom and an illegal organisation in the Republic of Ireland. The IRA have been held responsible for the killing of 1,705 people during The Troubles.

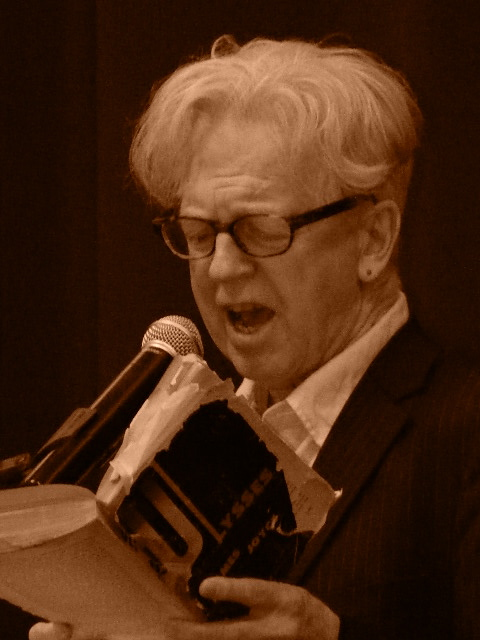
Kirwan at Barnes & Noble Tribeca's yearly Tribute to James Joyce
