= Hungladder =

Coordinates: 57.6568°N 6.37663°W

Hungladder: Scottish Gaelic: Hunagladair
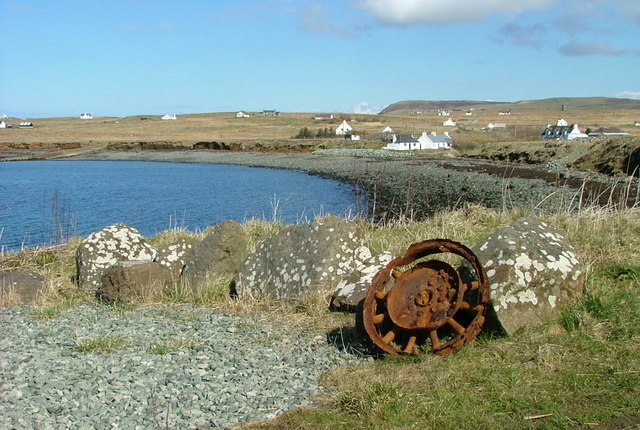
- Old Wheel at Camas Mor Looking over the bay towards the houses at Bornesketaig and Hungladder.

- Location within the Isle of Skye
- OS grid reference: NG347732
- Council area: Highland
- Country: Scotland
- Sovereign state: United Kingdom
- Postcode district: IV51 9
- Dialling code: 01470
- Police: Scotland
- Fire: Scottish
- Ambulance: Scottish
- UK Parliament: Inverness, Skye and West Ross-shire
- Scottish Parliament: Skye, Lochaber and Badenoch

Hungladder is a small village on north west coast of the Trotternish peninsula in Kilmuir, Portree, Isle of Skye, Scottish Highlands and is in the Scottish council area of Highland. The village of Uig, lies 5 miles to the south.
