= Loch Mealt =

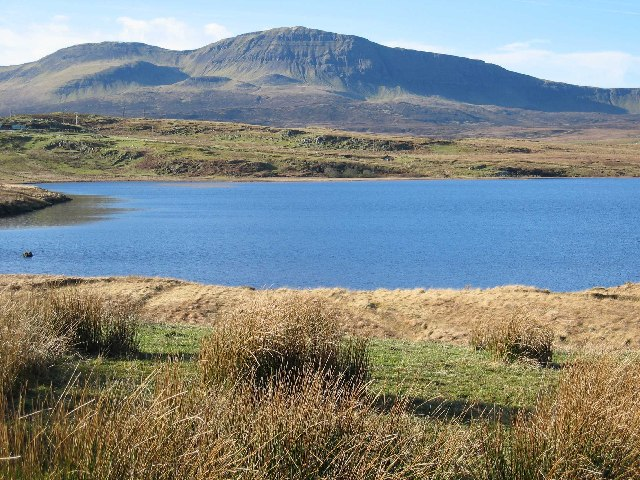
- Loch Mealt with Beinn Edra in the background

- Location within Highland
- Location: Isle of Skye, Highlands, Scotland
- Coordinates: 57°36′23″N 6°10′43″W
- Type: freshwater loch
- Basin countries: United Kingdom
- Surface elevation: 66 m (217 ft)

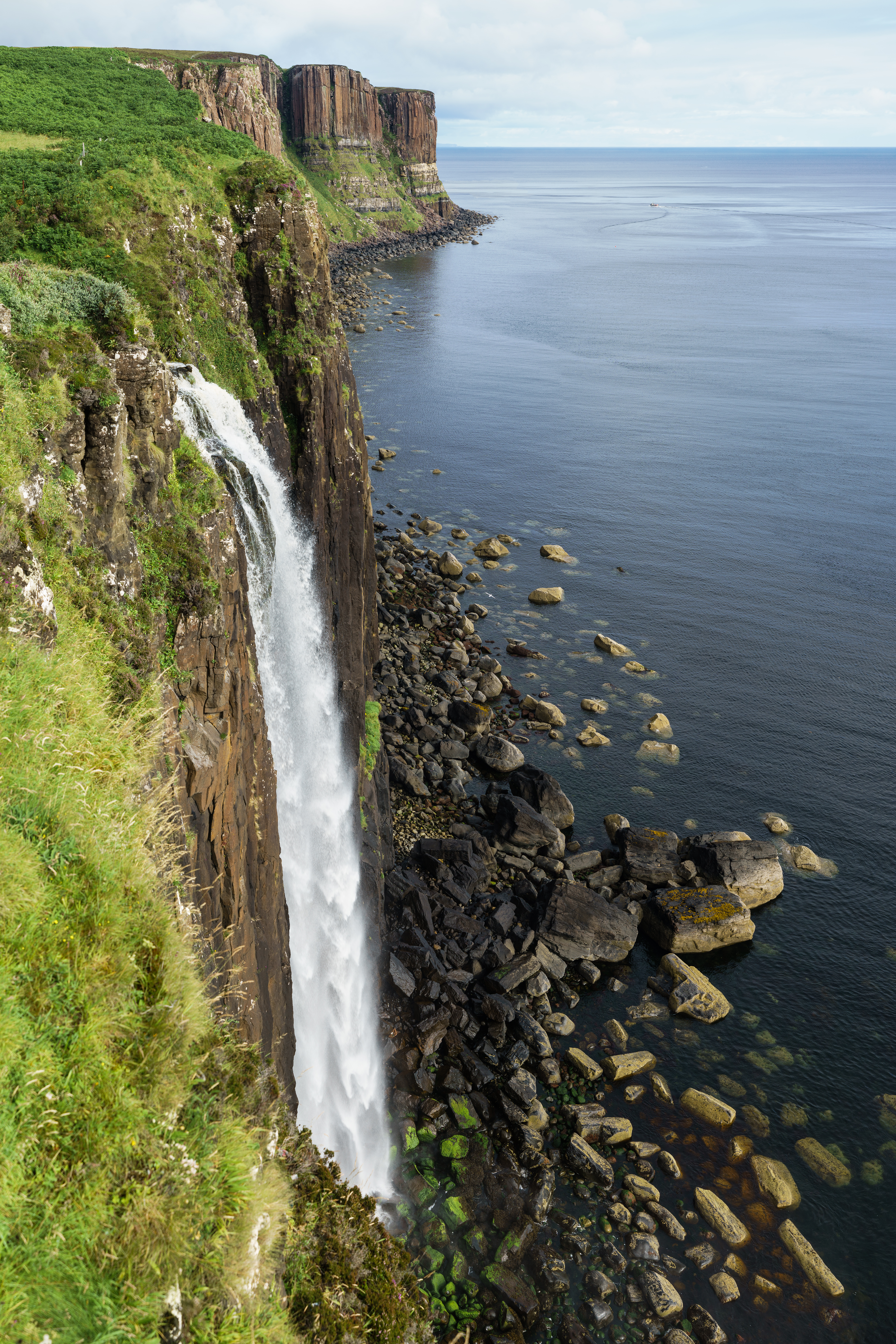
Mealt waterfall with Kilt Rock behind

Loch Mealt is an inland fresh-water loch on the Isle of Skye in Scotland. It lies close to Ellishadder and south of Staffin, on the eastern side of the Trotternish peninsula.

== Geography ==
This roughly square-shaped loch is about 1 km in length. It is located close to the sea and its eastern side comprises the spectacular 55 metres (180 ft) tall sea-cliffs of Kilt Rock, made of dolerite rock strata in many different colours. Kilt Rock boasts a dramatic waterfall created from the outflow of Loch Mealt.

== Ecology ==
There are a number of bird species in this roadside loch.Its waters are favoured by diving ducks.

The Orkney charr (Salvelinus inframundus), a char species that could be vulnerable to extinction, has been found in Loch Mealt. Since the impact of Canadian Arctic char the lake upon the native char population is unknown and the taxonomic identity of the char deemed as Salvelinus inframundus is lacking essential information, a full IUCN Red List assessment cannot be made.

== See also ==
- List of lochs in Scotland
