= Uig Tower =

Folly located on the Isle of Skye, Scotland

Coordinates: 57.5847°N 6.3592°W

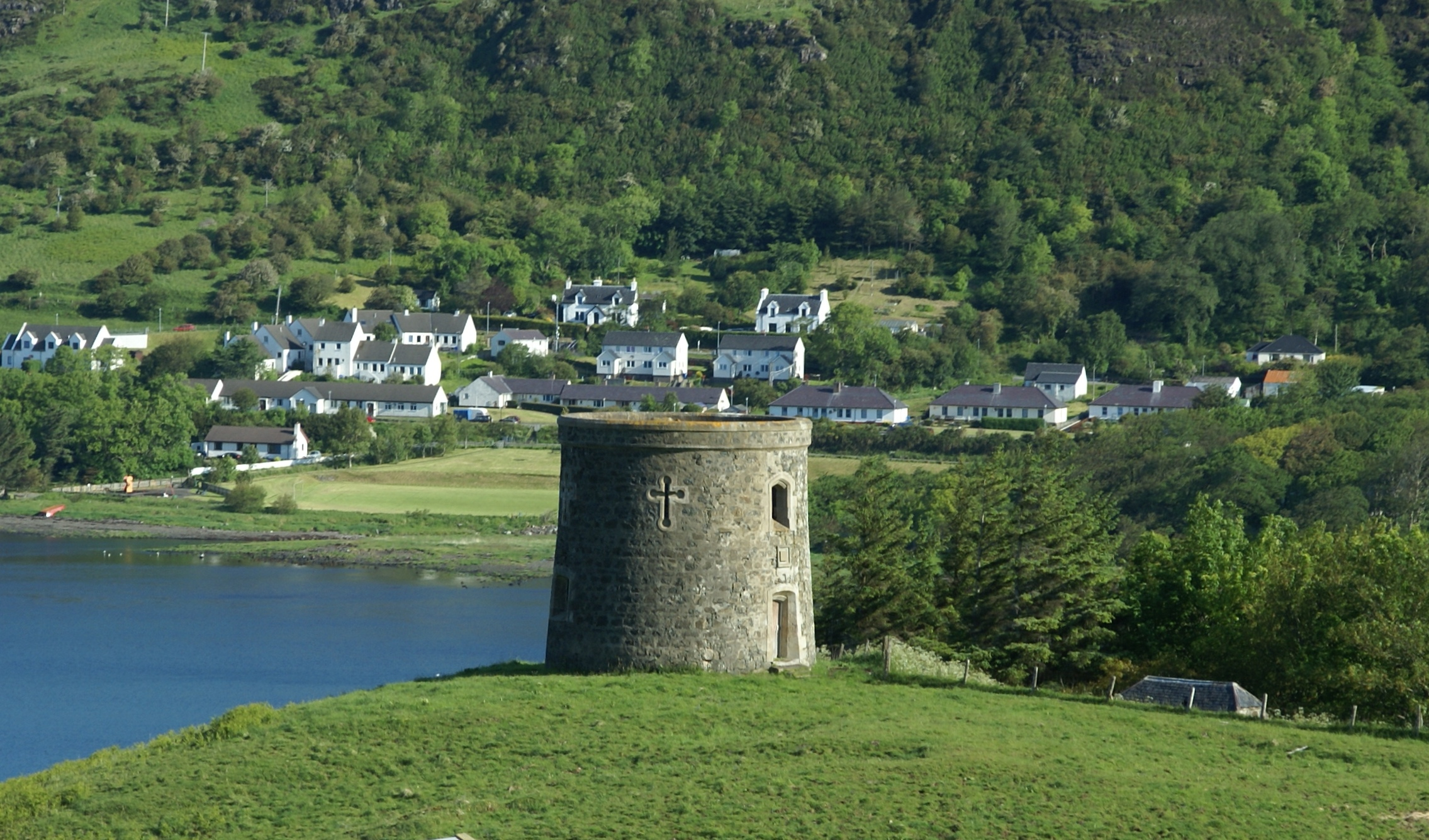

The Uig Tower, also known as Captain Fraser's Folly, is a nineteenth-century folly in Uig on the island of Skye in the Highlands of Scotland. It is a category B listed building.

== Location ==
The Uig Tower stands along the A87, which connects Portree and Uig, about two kilometers south of Uig. The tower is positioned on the southeastern side of the bay on its southern headland opposite Rubha Idrigil.

== History ==
Major William Fraser became the owner of the Kilmuir Estate in 1855 and the tower was constructed around 1860 at a place where the local tenants had to go to pay their rents to his Factor.

Fraser was, like many other landlords in Scotland, notorious for his contribution to the Highland Clearances, during which tenants were evicted so the land could become available for large-scale sheep farming. The folly is still associated by locals with the Clearances. Fraser lived in a large house called Uig Lodge, which was washed away in a flood in 1877 shortly after the conclusion of the clearances.

In 1884 Fraser attempted to evict a family at Garafad in Staffin during a rent strike. Fraser called for help from the Government to break the strike, claiming that the local people were in rebellion. In November 1884 a flotilla of naval ships arrived in Uig Bay and the police and marines took up positions in Uig. However, the strike was not broken, the family remained in their home, and the police and military left shortly thereafter.

The tower was later turned into a family home, but this was abandoned in the 1950s.

== Construction ==
The Uig Tower is a round tower of two floors and was built in Norman style. The tower has narrow vertical slits instead of windows. The gaps resemble loopholes of a castle through which arrows could be fired on attackers, although it has no defensive function and was built purely as a show of wealth. On the outside, the gaps are decorated with cross shapes.

The tower is no longer owned by the Uig Hotel but by a local land owner.
