= Tote, Skye =

Coordinates: 57.45732°N 6.29714°W

Tote: Scottish Gaelic: Tobhta
- Location within the Isle of Skye
- OS grid reference: NG423489
- Council area: Highland
- Country: Scotland
- Sovereign state: United Kingdom
- Post town: Portree
- Postcode district: IV51 9
- Police: Scotland
- Fire: Scottish
- Ambulance: Scottish

Tote (Scottish Gaelic: Tobhta) is a small crofting township, situated on the southwest coast of the Trotternish peninsula, at the head of the sea loch, Loch Snizort Beag on the island of Skye and is in the Scottish council area of Highland.

The village of Skeabost is located directly to the south, and Carbost is located directly southeast.

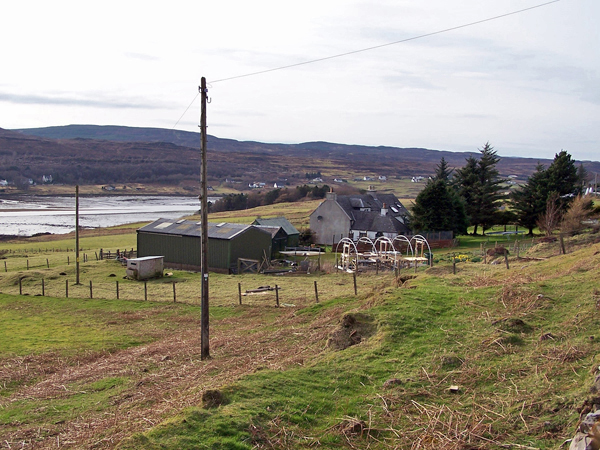
Working croft at Tote
