= 106.2 FM =

FM radio frequency

The following radio stations broadcast on FM frequency 106.2 MHz:

== China ==
- CNR Easy Radio in Fuzhou, Putian and east of Quanzhou
- CNR The Voice of China in Nanning and Weihai
- SZMG Traffic Radio in Shenzhen

== Israel ==
- IDC Radio

== Malaysia ==
- IKIMfm in Johor Bahru, Johor

== Mozambique ==
- Rádio Acção from Maputo, Mozambique.

== New Zealand ==
- Flava in Dunedin

== Russia ==
- Europa Plus in Moscow

== Taiwan ==
- Transfer CNR Easy Radio in Matsu

== United Kingdom ==
- Heart Yorkshire in Barnsley
- Heart South Wales in Fishguard
- Heart London
- Sunshine Radio in Hereford
- Mearns FM in Inverbervie
- Radio Skye in Portree
- Salaam Radio in Peterborough
- 3FM in Peel
