= Kingsburgh, Skye =

Coordinates: 57.51321°N 6.351968°W

Kingsburgh: Scottish Gaelic: Cinnseaborgh
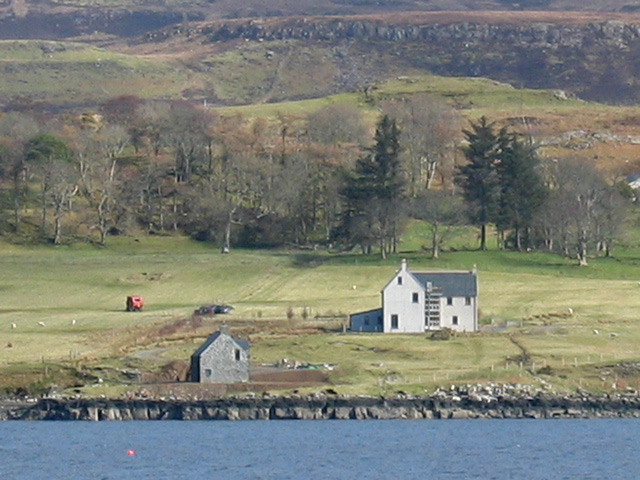
- Boathouse on Loch Snizort

- Location within the Isle of Skye
- OS grid reference: NG394553
- Council area: Highland
- Country: Scotland
- Sovereign state: United Kingdom
- Post town: Portree
- Postcode district: IV51
- Dialling code: 01470
- Police: Scotland
- Fire: Scottish
- Ambulance: Scottish

Kingsburgh (Gaelic: Cinnseaborgh) is a scattered crofting township, overlooking Loch Snizort Beag on the Trotternish peninsula of the Isle of Skye in the Highlands of Scotland. It is in the council area of Highland. Kingsburgh is located 5 1/2 miles (9 kilometres) south of Uig.

Kingsburgh is famous as the place that Flora MacDonald lived after helping Bonnie Prince Charlie escape to France after his defeat at Culloden.
