= CnaG =

CnaG is an abbreviation for three separate Gaelic organisations:

- Cumann na nGaedheal ("Society of the Gaels") - an historic political party in Ireland
- Comunn na Gàidhlig ("The Gaelic language Society") - an organisation which seeks to promote Scottish Gaelic language and culture
- Conradh na Gaeilge - a social and cultural organisation which promotes the Irish language in Ireland and worldwide
