= Staffin =

Coordinates: 57.62635°N 6.20670°W

Staffin: Scottish Gaelic: Stafain
- Location within the Isle of Skye
- OS grid reference: NG483684
- Council area: Highland
- Country: Scotland
- Sovereign state: United Kingdom
- Post town: Portree
- Postcode district: IV51 9
- Police: Scotland
- Fire: Scottish
- Ambulance: Scottish

Staffin (Scottish Gaelic: Stafain) is a township with the Gaelic name An Taobh Sear, which translates as "the East Side", on the northeast coast of the Trotternish peninsula on the Isle of Skye. It is located on the A855 road about 17 miles (27 kilometres) north of Portree and is overlooked by the Trotternish Ridge (including the Quiraing). The township forms part of a parish comprising 23 townships. From south to north: Rigg, Tote, Lealt, Lonfearn, Grealin, Breackry, Culnancnoc, Valtos, Raiseburgh, Ellishadder, Garafad, Clachan, Garros, Marishader, Maligar, Stenscholl, Brogaig, Sartle, Glasphein, Digg, Dunans, Flodigarry and Greap.

== Geography and natural history ==
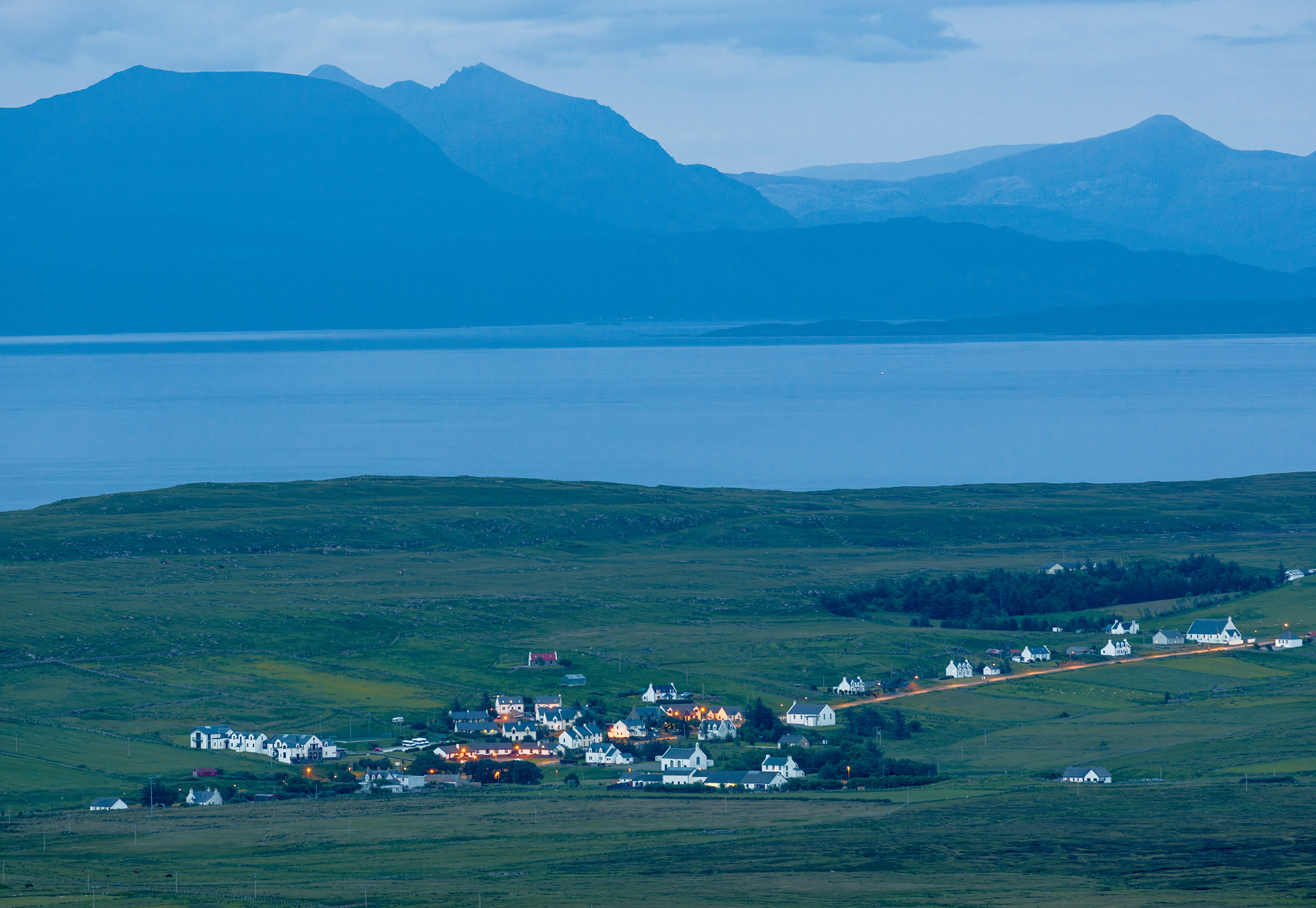
Staffin at dusk viewed from the Quiraing ridge

The Kilmartin River flows northwards through the village and outflows as the Stenscholl River at Stenscholl. To the east at An Corran a seasonally exposed rippled wave cut platform contains at least 18 dinosaur footprints, measuring up to 50 cm in length, attributed to a large theropod akin to Megalosaurus. The footprints date to the Middle Jurassic (approximately 170 million years ago) and occur above an igneous platform - with natural cracks often mistaken for dinosaur footprints. An Corran was also a Mesolithic hunter-gatherer site dating to the 7th millennium BC - one of the oldest archaeological sites in Scotland. Its occupation is probably linked to that of the rock shelter at Sand, Applecross on the coast of Wester Ross.

== Community ==
Today, Staffin and its surrounding townships retain a strong Gaelic identity, with 61 per cent of the local population recorded as speaking the language in 2001. In September 2010, Comunn na Gàidhlig named Staffin as their "Gaelic Community of the Year", in the first year this competition has run. Also in September 2010, Highland Council announced the launch of a consultation into a plan to convert the local primary into a Gaelic medium school. This would be the second such conversion in Scotland, after Bun-sgoil Shlèite. Only 5 out of the school's thirty pupils have English as their only language, with the remainder being bilingual English and Gaelic speakers.

In 2011, Staffin Island is one of the last in Scotland where the old tradition of having cattle swim between grazings is still carried out. Crofter Iain MacDonald, who used to swim with the animals, used a boat to encourage them to swim from Staffin Island to Skye in early spring and back again in October.

In December 2013, Staffin Community Trust (SCT) was awarded a grant by the Heritage Lottery for the Skye Ecomuseum - also known as the Druim nan Linntean (Ridge of Ages). The Skye Ecomuseum is an outdoor museum set in the Trotternish landscape spanning between Loch Langaig (Flodigarry) and An Stòrr (Old Man of Storr) aiming to engage visitors with local natural history and heritage through the improvement of local paths/infrastructure (including a viewing platform at Lealt Gorge) and establishment of informative signage.

Currently, the SCT are improving the infrastructure at Staffin Harbour and building the Crofters' Memorial, Sùil nam Brà, at Kilt Rock.

Within the community, there is a war memorial dedicated to the lives lost to the Boer War as well as the First and Second World Wars. In 2015, the names of the USAAF crew that perished in the 1945 Beinn Edra air disaster were added to the memorial on the 70th anniversary of the crash.

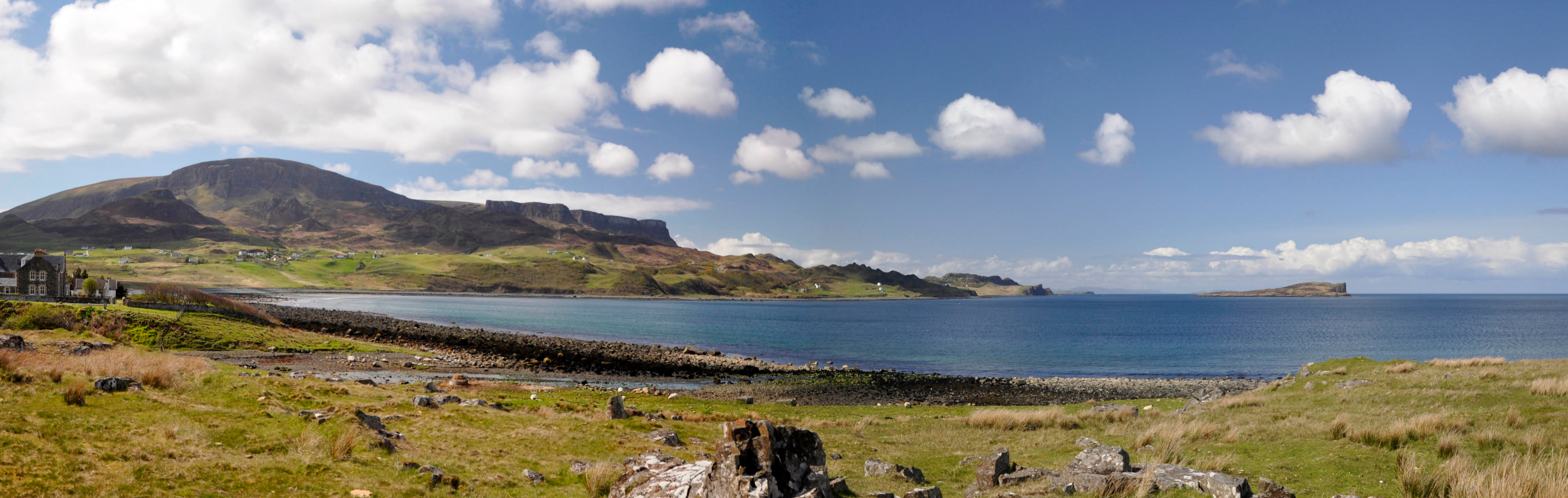
Staffin and Staffin Bay

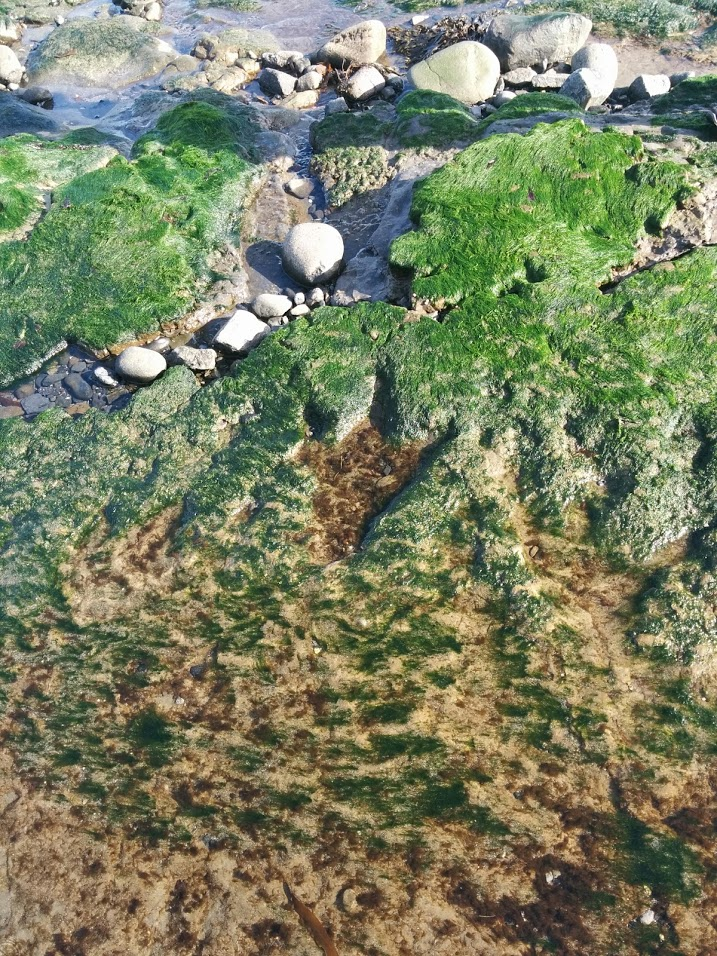
Dinosaur footprint on beach in Staffin

== See also ==
Druim nan Linntean - Skye Ecomuseum
