= Radio Skye =

Coordinates: 57.4171°N 6.1938°W

- Portree; United Kingdom
- Broadcast area: Isle of Skye and Lochalsh
- Frequencies: FM: 102.7 MHz (Skye & Lochalsh); 106.2 MHz (Portree); 106.2 MHz (Sleat); 107.2 MHz (Staffin)
- RDS: Rad Skye
- Branding: Local Broadcasting across Skye and Lochalsh

Programming
- Format: Community based speech, local news and events, music, sport

Ownership
- Owner: Community owned

History
- First air date: 3 July 2004 (21 years ago)

Technical information
- Licensing authority: Ofcom

Links
- Website: radioskye.com

Radio Skye is a local radio station which broadcasts from Portree to the Isle of Skye, as well as the region of Lochalsh, Wester Ross, on the Scottish mainland.

== History ==
Radio Skye first started under its original name of Cuillin FM, in the mid-1990s, operating a number of temporary Restricted Service Licence broadcasts from a location at the former Aros Centre. The station took its name from the mountain range on Skye, which also made up the background of the station's logo. It launched as a full-time radio service on 3 July 2004, with its coverage initially restricted to the Portree area. The station became available across the Isle of Skye with the launch on 28 July 2007 of a high powered signal from Skriaig on 102.7 FM.

On 19 July 2020, Cuillin FM became Radio Skye following a relaunch. In 2022, it extended its signal to previously unserved areas of Sleat and Trotternish, including Staffin.

=== Programming ===
Radio Skye broadcasts live from their studio in Portree, with daily breakfast and drivetime programmes along with regular news bulletins. The daily schedule is also filled with live and pre-recorded shows. The station has a duty to provide at least three hours of Gaelic programming per week.

Radio Skye also has outside broadcasting facilities for outdoor and on-location events such as shinty matches, the Highland Games, Piping and Music Festivals, and agricultural shows.
