= Brogaig =

Coordinates: 57.64326°N 6.22503°W

Brogaig: Scottish Gaelic: Brògaig
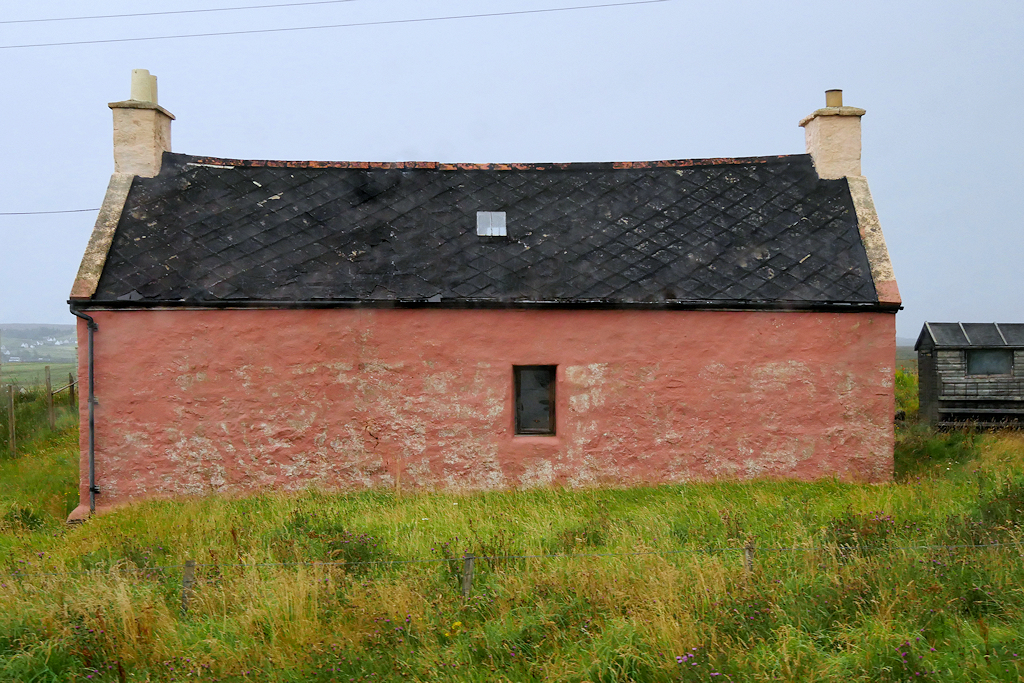
- Mission Cottage

- Location within the Isle of Skye
- OS grid reference: NG470681
- Council area: Highland
- Country: Scotland
- Sovereign state: United Kingdom
- Post town: Portree
- Police: Scotland
- Fire: Scottish
- Ambulance: Scottish

Brogaig (Scottish Gaelic: Brògaig), Norse for Burgh Bay, is a small coastal village, on the northwest coast of the Trotternish peninsula, close to Staffin and Stenscholl, in the Isle of Skye, in the council area of Highland, Scotland and is in the council area of Highland. It is sometimes possible to see sea mammals in the bay. Brogaig is well known for excellent cycling routes.

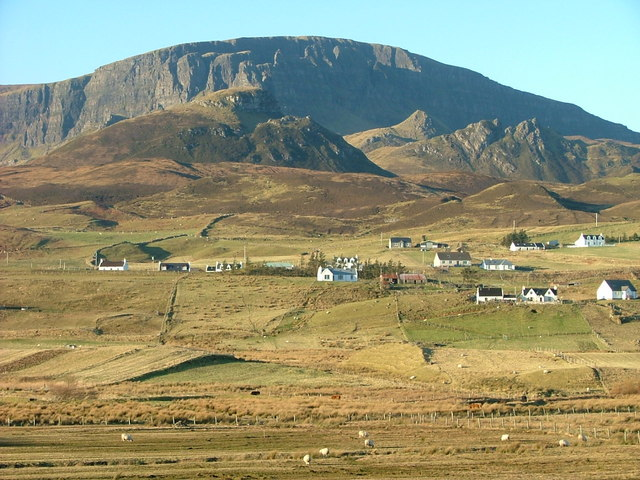
Croftland at Brogaig
