= Garafad =

Coordinates: 57.62634°N 6.1873°W

Garafad: Scottish Gaelic: An Garradh Fada
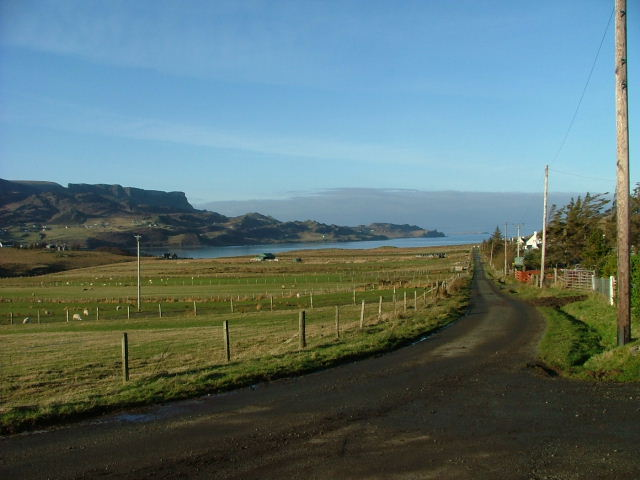
- Looking through Garafad towards Staffin Bay

- Location within the Isle of Skye
- OS grid reference: NG501673
- Council area: Highland
- Country: Scotland
- Sovereign state: United Kingdom
- Post town: Staffin
- Postcode district: IV51 9
- Police: Scotland
- Fire: Scottish
- Ambulance: Scottish

Garafad or Garafad, (Scottish Gaelic: An Garradh Fada) is a linear crofting settlement on the east coast of the Trotternish Peninsula of Skye in the Scottish Highlands and is in the Scottish council area of Highland.

It is part of Staffin, and lies 14 miles (23 kilometres) north of Portree.
