= Trotternish =

Northernmost peninsula of the Isle of Skye in Scotland

Trotternish National Scenic Area
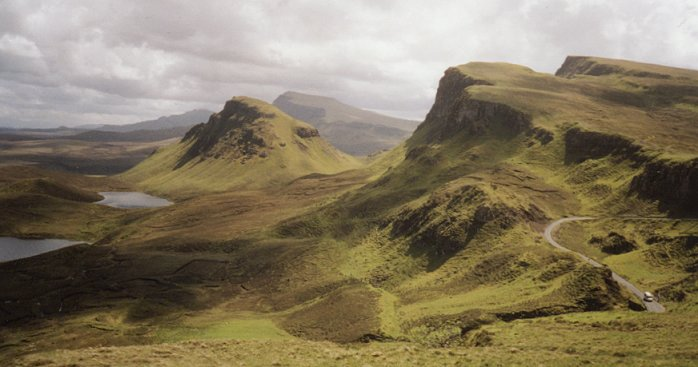
- The Quiraing

- Location within Highland
- Location: Isle of Skye, Scotland
- Coordinates: 57°38′37″N 6°15′55″W
- Area: 342 km^{2} (132 sq mi)
- Established: 1981
- Governing body: NatureScot

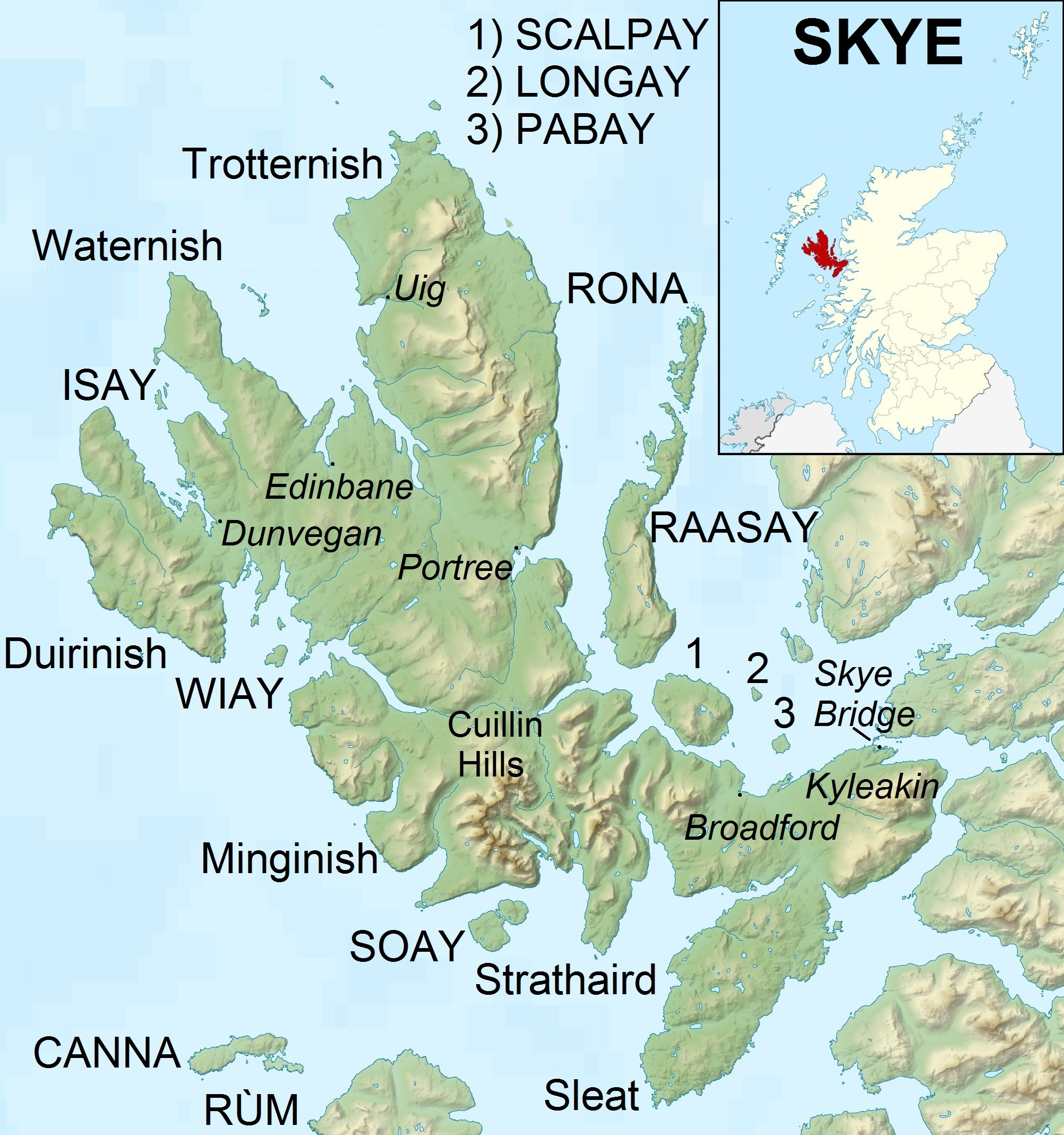
Map of Skye showing Trotternish, Portree, and Uig

Trotternish (Scottish Gaelic: Tròndairnis) is the northernmost peninsula of the Isle of Skye in Scotland, spanning in length from Portree to Rubha Hunish. The Trotternish escarpment runs almost the full length of the peninsula, some 30 kilometres (20 miles), and contains landmarks such as the Old Man of Storr and the Quiraing. The summit of The Storr, overlooking the Old Man, is the highest point of the peninsula at 719 m above sea level. The north-eastern part of the peninsula around Quiraing is designated as a National Scenic Area and the entire escarpment is a Special Area of Conservation.

Dinosaur footprints have been found at An Corran, which is also a Mesolithic hunter-gatherer site dating to the 7th millennium BC. The ruins of the 14th–15th-century Duntulm Castle stand at the northern end of the peninsula.

The three major settlements on Trotternish are Portree, generally regarded as the capital of Skye, Uig, a ferry terminus, and the township of Staffin. Trotternish is the strongest Gaelic-speaking area of Skye.

== Geography and natural history ==
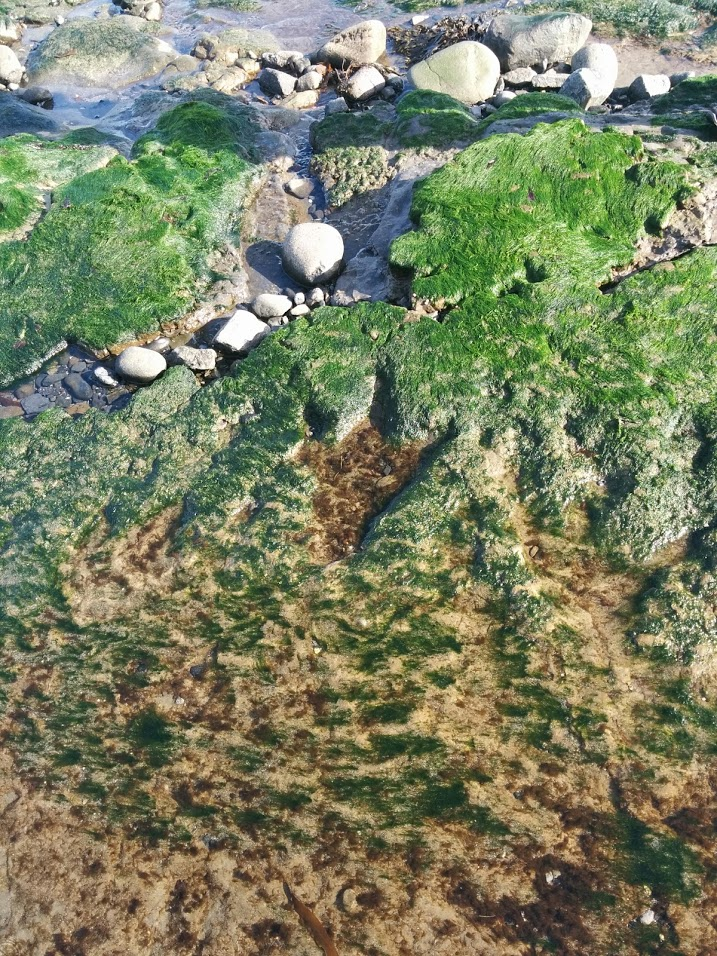
Dinosaur footprint on the beach at Staffin.

Trotternish is underlain by basalt, which provides relatively rich soils and a variety of unusual rock features. The Kilt Rock is named after the tartan-like patterns in the 105-metre (344-foot) cliffs. The Quiraing is a spectacular series of rock pinnacles on the eastern side of the main spine of the peninsula and further south is the rock pillar of the Old Man of Storr.

Trotternish is also known for its Middle Jurassic aged rocks (c. 174–164 million years old), which yield a variety of fossils including dinosaurs. These are strictly protected by law by the Skye Nature Conservation Order 2019. Dinosaurs known from Trotternish include theropods, sauropods, thyreophorans, and possible ornithopods. Many of Skye's dinosaur body fossils and footprints can be viewed at the Staffin Museum in Ellishadder, Staffin. The most accessible shoreline localities to view dinosaur footprints include Duntulm, Brother's Point, and An Corran.

=== Conservation designations ===
The north-eastern part of the peninsula around Quiraing is designated as the Trotternish National Scenic Area, one of the forty such areas in Scotland, which are defined so as to identify areas of exceptional scenery and to ensure its protection from inappropriate development. The designated area covers 7,919 ha in total, of which 6,128 ha is on land, with a further 1789 ha being marine (i.e. below low tide level, and covering the seas to the east of the peninsula).

The entire length of the Trotternish escarpment is protected as a Special Area of Conservation under the Natura 2000 programme, and classified as a Category IV protected area by the International Union for Conservation of Nature.

== History ==
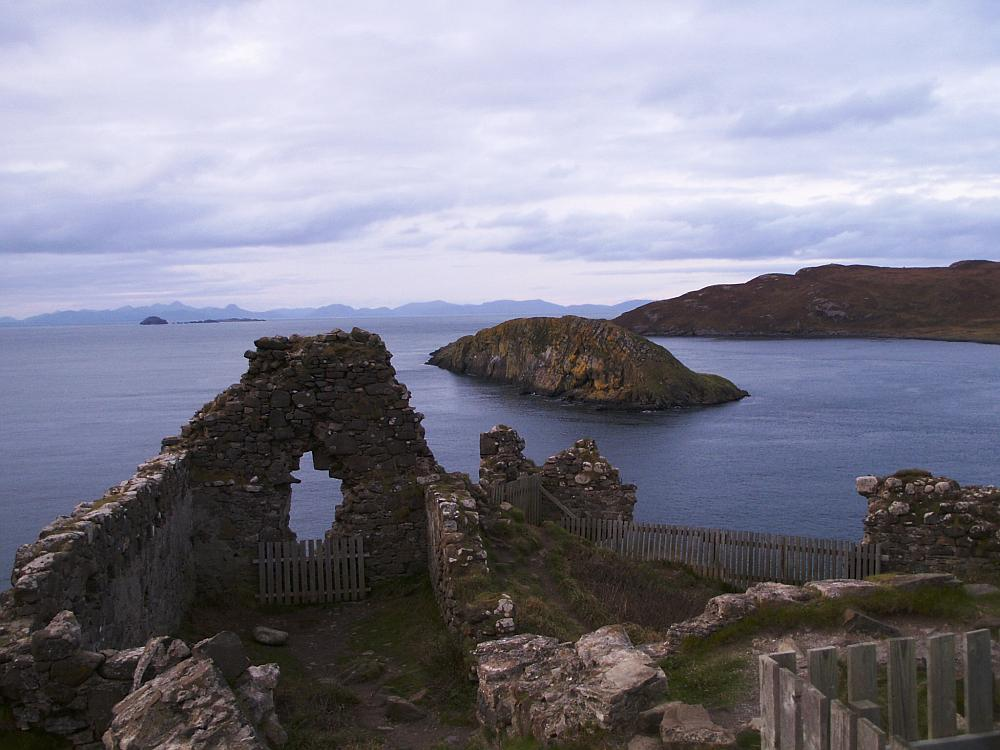
Duntulm Castle.

A Mesolithic hunter-gatherer site dating to the 7th millennium BC at An Corran in Staffin is one of the oldest archaeological sites in Scotland. The site continued to be used over many millennia with human bones radiocarbon-dated to the Neolithic (dated to around 3500 BC) and Bronze Age (dated to between 2560 and 2150 BC) periods and a copper-alloy pin from the Late Bronze Age/Early Iron Age being found, as well as more modern 19th-20th century materials.

Its Mesolithic occupation is probably linked to that of the rock shelter at Sand, Applecross, on the mainland coast of Wester Ross where tools made of a mudstone from An Corran have been found. Surveys of the area between the two shores of the Inner Sound and Sound of Raasay have revealed 33 sites with potentially Mesolithic deposits.

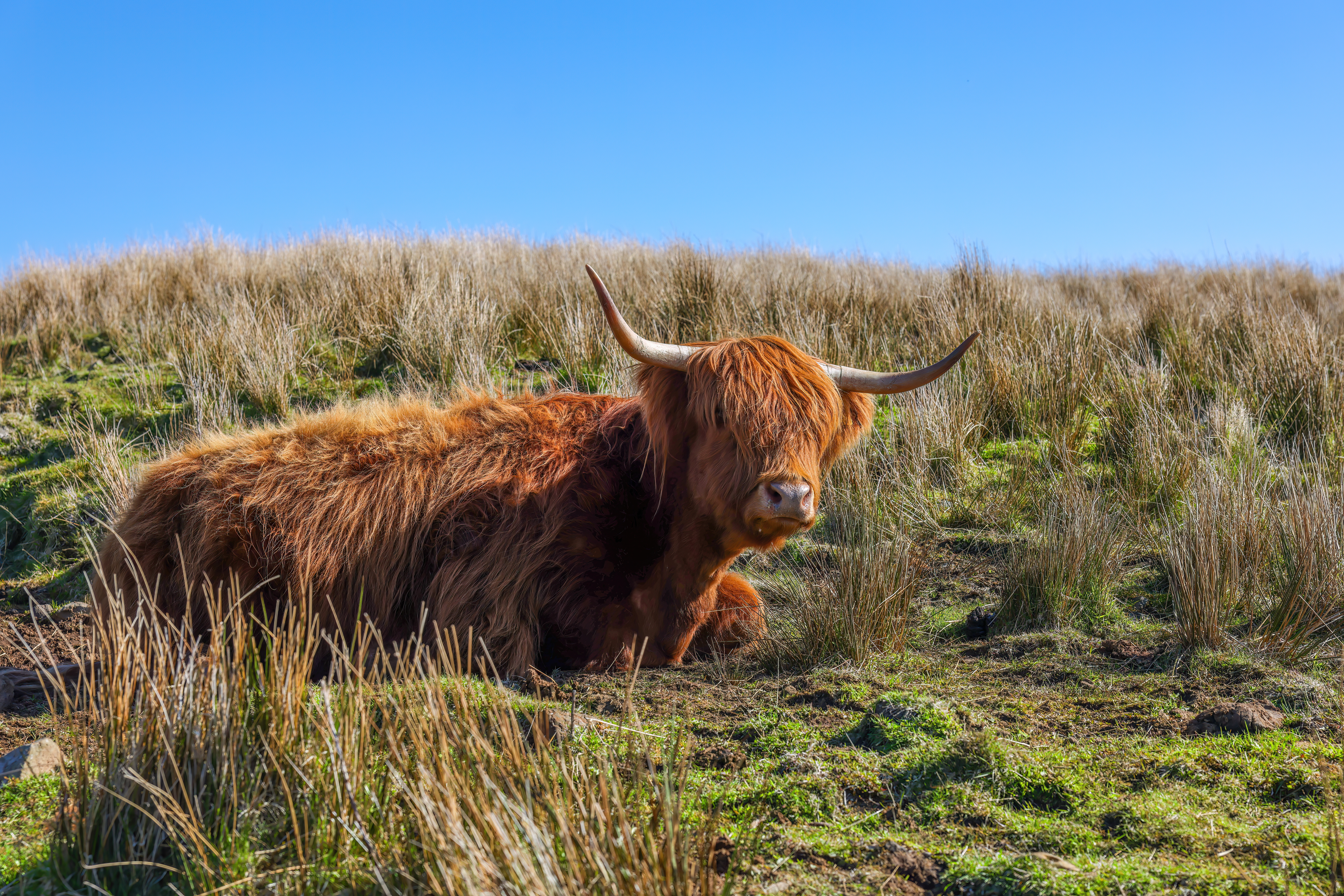
Highland cattle in Trotternish

The ruined Duntulm Castle stands on a promontory at the northern end of the peninsula, near the hamlet of Duntulm. During the 17th century it was the seat of the chiefs of Clan MacDonald of Sleat, and is a scheduled monument. The castle is believed to stand on the site of a prehistoric broch or dun known as Dun David, or Dun Dhaibhidh, although no archaeological evidence has been found for this predecessor. The castle was built in the 14th and 15th centuries, when the area was subject to feuds between the rival MacLeod and Macdonald clans, and was abandoned around 1732, when Sir Alexander MacDonald built a new residence, Monkstadt House, 5 miles (8 kilometres) to the south.

Between 1750 and 1772, Flodigarry, north of Staffin, was the home of Flora MacDonald, the Jacobite made famous by her part in Prince Charles Edward Stuart's escape after his defeat at Culloden. She later moved to Kingsburgh on the southwestern coast of Trotternish, and it was here that Boswell and Johnson met her during their tour of the Western Isles in 1773. Johnson, who held Jacobite views when younger, commented that she was a woman of "soft features, gentle manners, and elegant presence".

== Gaelic ==
In terms of number of speakers, Trotternish is the strongest Gaelic-speaking area of Skye. In the 2001 census, 61% of the population returned as Gaelic speakers, there are Gaelic-medium units in the Staffin and Kilmuir primary schools, and the area is the focus of one of Comunn na Gàidhlig's Gaelic development initiatives, Lasair. In 2010, Comunn na Gàidhlig named Staffin as their Gaelic Community of the Year.

== Transport ==
The main road in Trotternish is the A87, which runs between Portree at the southern end of the peninsula and Uig on the northwest coast. Uig marks the northwestern terminus of the A87, with its southeastern terminus being the junction with the A82 at Invergarry, to the north of Fort William. The A855 road also links Portree and Uig, taking a route along the eastern coast and around the northern end of the peninsula: the two roads thus combine to encircle Trotternish. A minor road also crosses the peninsula, passing between Uig and Staffin via the Quiraing.

Portree is the terminus for Scottish Citylink buses from Glasgow Buchanan bus station and Inverness, with some services continuing on to Uig. Uig serves as the ferry terminal for Caledonian MacBrayne services to Tarbert on Harris and Lochmaddy on North Uist, providing links with the Outer Hebrides.

== Settlements in Trotternish ==
- Achachork
- Bornesketaig
- Brogaig
- Carbost
- Culnacnoc
- Digg
- Duntulm
- Earlish
- Ellishadder
- Eyre
- Flodigarry
- Garafad
- Glasphein
- Grealin
- Hungladder
- Kensaleyre
- Kilmaluag
- Kilmuir
- Kilvaxter
- Kingsburgh
- Lealt
- Marishader
- Portree
- Skeabost
- Staffin
- Toravaig
- Tote
- Uig

== Gallery ==
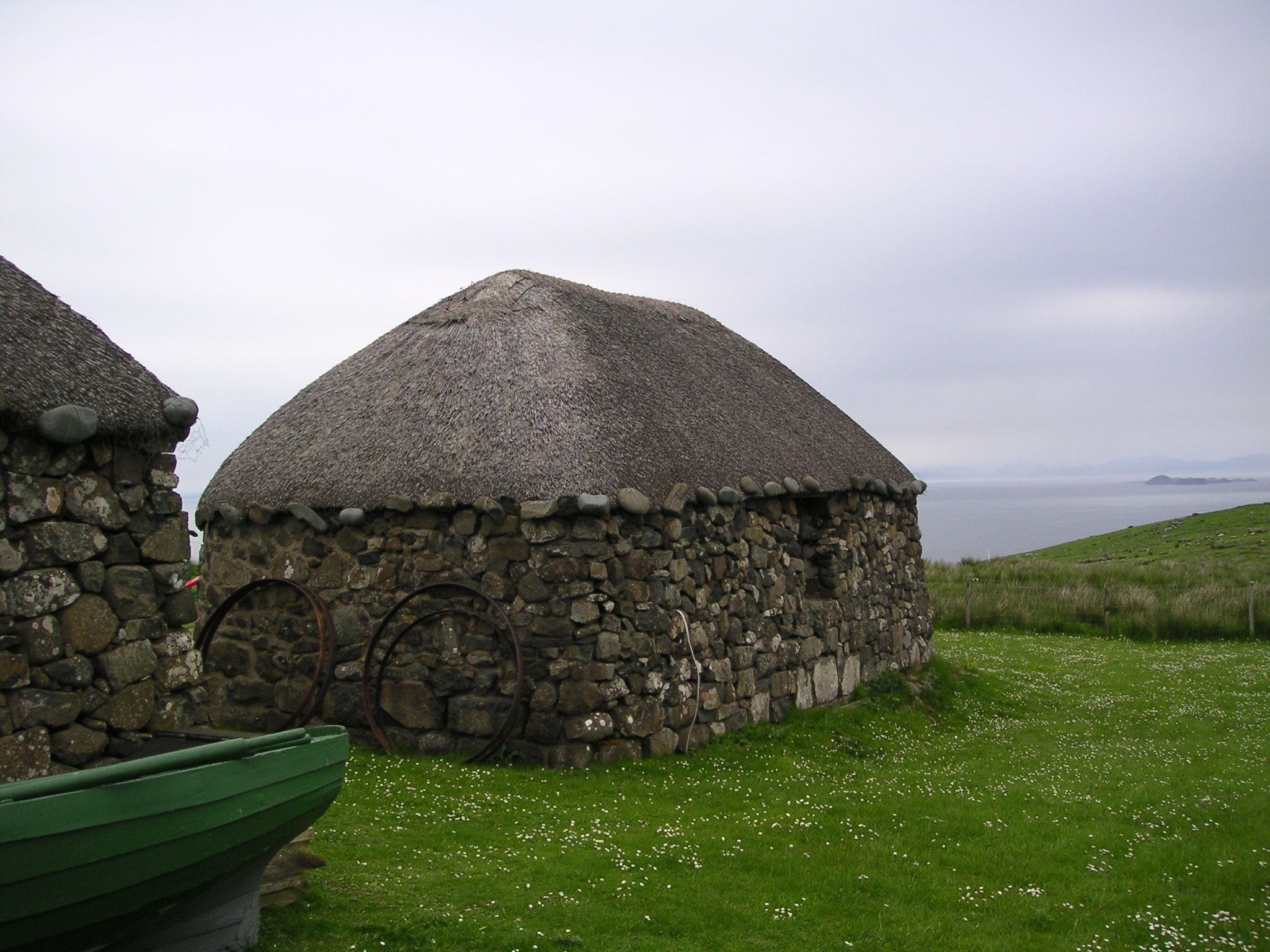
Blackhouse in The Skye Museum of Island Life on Trotternish

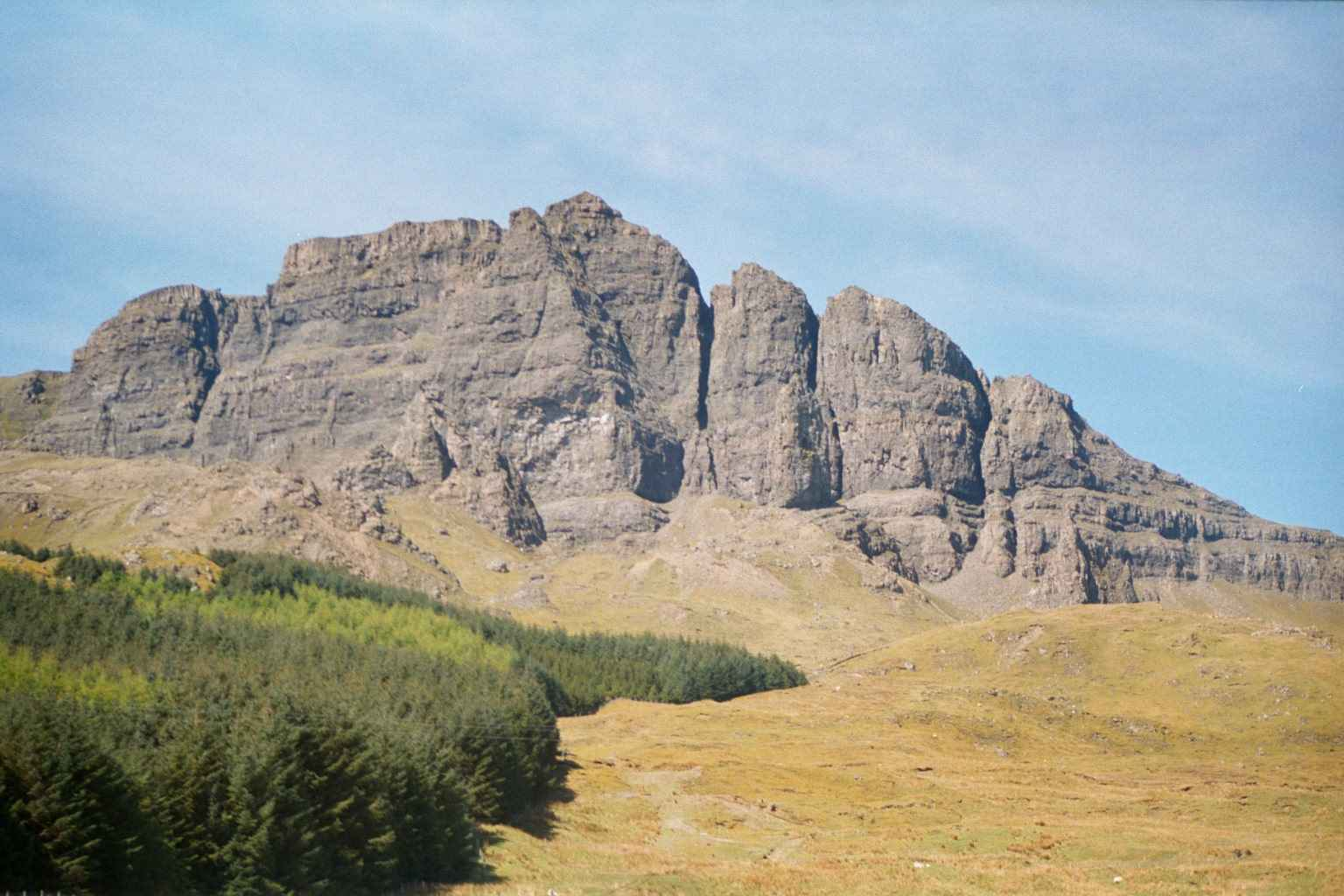
The Storr

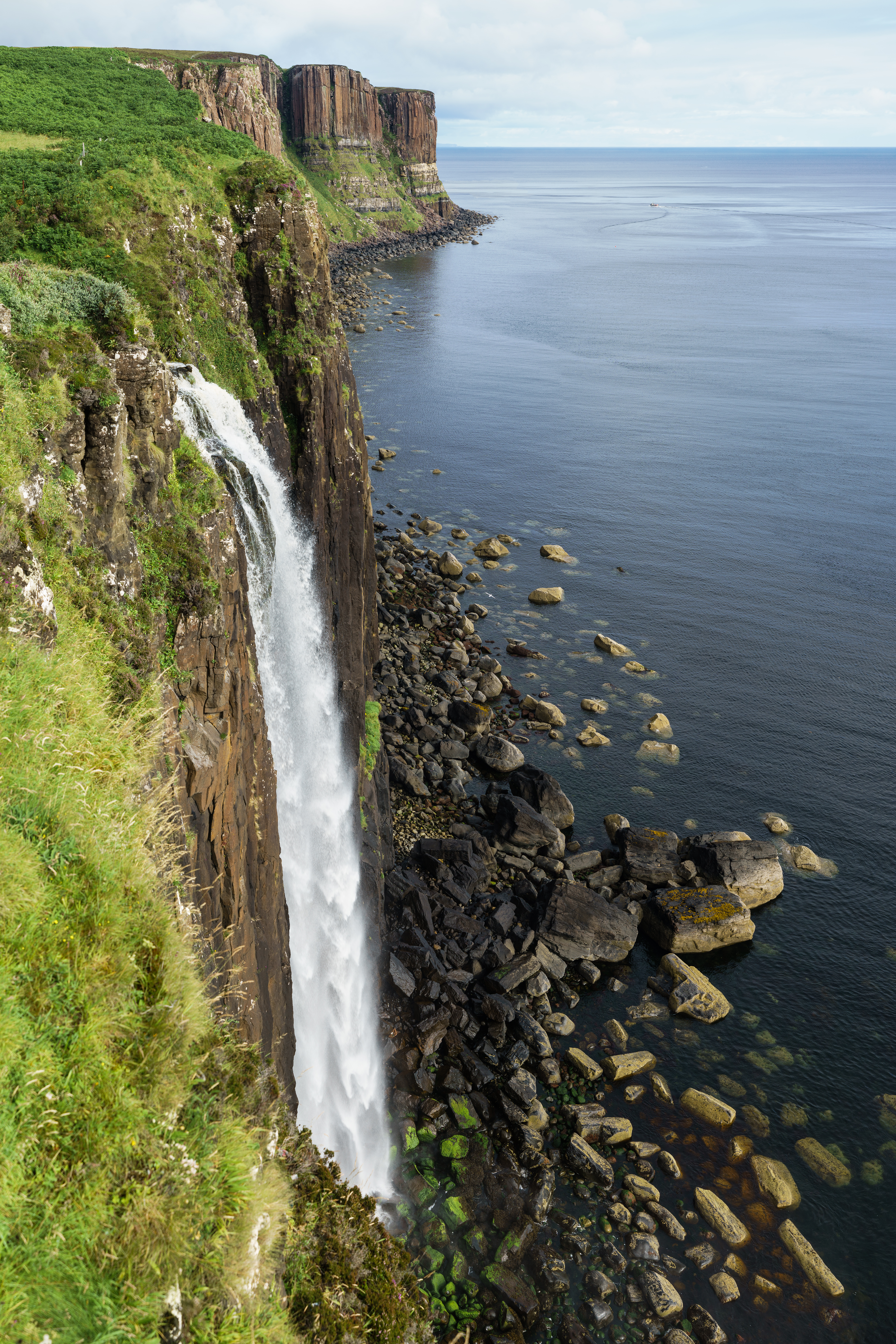
Mealt waterfall at Ellishadder, with Kilt Rock behind
