= Kilvaxter =

Township on the Isle of Skye, Scotland

Coordinates: 57.64086°N 6.37664°W

Kilvaxter: Scottish Gaelic: Cille Bhacastair
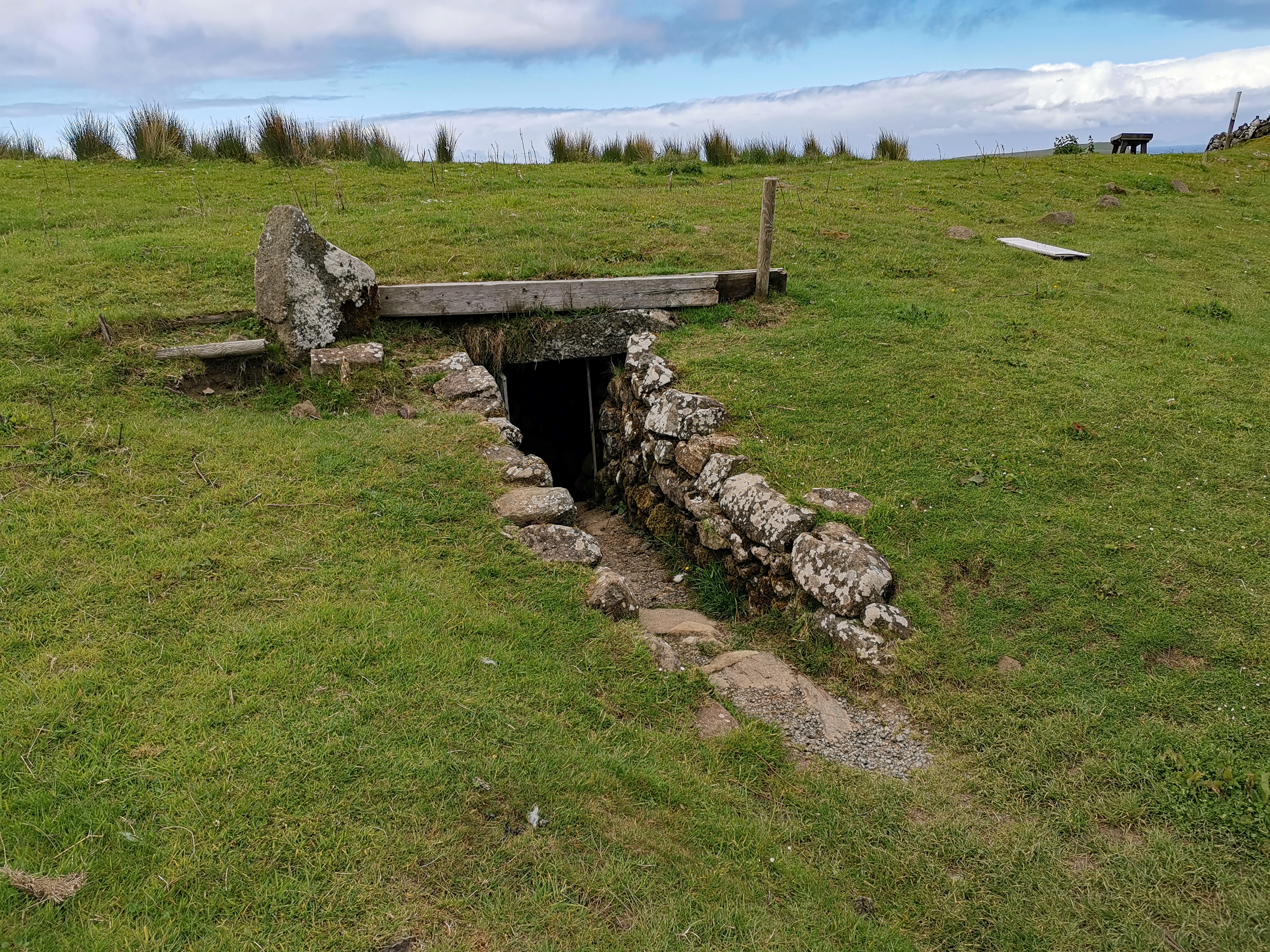
- Souterrain near Kilvaxter

- Location within the Isle of Skye
- OS grid reference: NG389696
- Council area: Highland
- Country: Scotland
- Sovereign state: United Kingdom
- Post town: Kilmuir
- Postcode district: IV51 9
- Police: Scotland
- Fire: Scottish
- Ambulance: Scottish

Kilvaxter (Scottish Gaelic: Cille Bhacastair) is a crofting township located on the Trotternish peninsula of the Isle of Skye in the Highlands of Scotland. It is in the council area of Highland. The A855 road passes through the area. Kilvaxter is 5 kilometres (3 miles) north of Uig. A Souterrain exists close to Kilvaxter, and was discovered in April 2000, when a lintel collapsed, and it became visible at the surface. It was excavated and is now open to the public.
