= List of listed buildings in Kilmuir, Skye =

This is a list of listed buildings in the parish of Kilmuir, on the Isle of Skye in the Highland council area of Scotland.

== List ==
Name	Location	Date Listed	Grid Ref. (Note: Sometimes known as OSGB36, the grid reference (where provided) is based on the British national grid reference system used by the Ordnance Survey. • "Guide to National Grid". Ordnance Survey. • "Get-a-map". Ordnance Survey.)	Geo-coordinates	Notes	LB Number (Note: Historic Environment Scotland assign a unique alphanumeric identifier to each designated site in Scotland, for listed buildings this always begins with "LB", for example "LB12345".)	Image
23 Bornesketaig				57°38′47″N 6°23′15″W	Category B	7239	Upload Photo
Kilmuir Graveyard				57°39′40″N 6°21′44″W	Category B	7246	Upload another image See more images
Staffin Stenscholl Parish Manse				57°37′31″N 6°12′28″W	Category B	7250	Upload another image
Flodigarry Cottage (To Rear Of Flodigarry Hotel)				57°39′55″N 6°15′14″W	Category C(S)	7242	Upload Photo
Monkstadt House And Steading				57°37′15″N 6°23′24″W	Category B	7247	Upload Photo
40 Bornesketaig (Beaton's Croft House)				57°39′00″N 6°23′47″W	Category A	7240	Upload another image See more images
Kilmaluag, Conista, Byres				57°40′35″N 6°18′30″W	Category B	7244	Upload Photo
Kilmaluag 3 Shulista				57°41′18″N 6°19′08″W	Category B	7245	Upload Photo
Osmigarry Croft Museum				57°39′37″N 6°22′09″W	Category B	7248	Upload another image See more images
Elishader Folk Museum				57°36′44″N 6°10′40″W	Category B	7241	Upload Photo
5 Hungladder				57°39′28″N 6°22′39″W	Category B	7243	Upload Photo
Staffin Stenscholl Parish (Church Of Scotland)				57°37′32″N 6°12′26″W	Category B	7249	Upload Photo

== Key ==
The scheme for classifying buildings in Scotland is:

- Category A: "buildings of national or international importance, either architectural or historic; or fine, little-altered examples of some particular period, style or building type."
- Category B: "buildings of regional or more than local importance; or major examples of some particular period, style or building type, which may have been altered."
- Category C: "buildings of local importance; lesser examples of any period, style, or building type, as originally constructed or moderately altered; and simple traditional buildings which group well with other listed buildings."

In March 2016 there were 47,288 listed buildings in Scotland. Of these, 8% were Category A, and 50% were Category B, with the remaining 42% being Category C.

== See also ==
- List of listed buildings in Highland
