= An Comunn Gàidhealach =

Scottish organisation

- Abbreviation: An Comunn
- Formation: 1891
- Type: Scottish Gaelic language Gaelic revival
- Headquarters: Inverness, Highlands
- Website: ancomunn.co.uk

An Comunn Gàidhealach (Scottish Gaelic pronunciation: [əŋ ˈkʰomən̪ˠ ˈkɛːəl̪ˠəx]; literally "The Gaelic Association"), commonly known as An Comunn, is a Scottish organisation that supports and promotes the Scottish Gaelic language and Scottish Gaelic culture and history at local, national and international levels. The society is closely associated with the Royal National Mòd. The symbol used for An Comunn Gàidhealach is the Irish Sunburst flag at the top also a symbol associated in Irish mythology and the Celtic harp on the bottom right.

== History ==
It was founded in Oban in 1891 to help preserve and develop the Gaelic language and to establish the Royal National Mòd (Scottish Gaelic: Am Mòd Nàiseanta Rìoghail), a festival of Gaelic music, arts and culture modelled originally on the National Eisteddfod of Wales. Today An Comunn encourages the teaching, learning and use of the Gaelic language, and the study and cultivation of Gaelic literature, history, music and art.

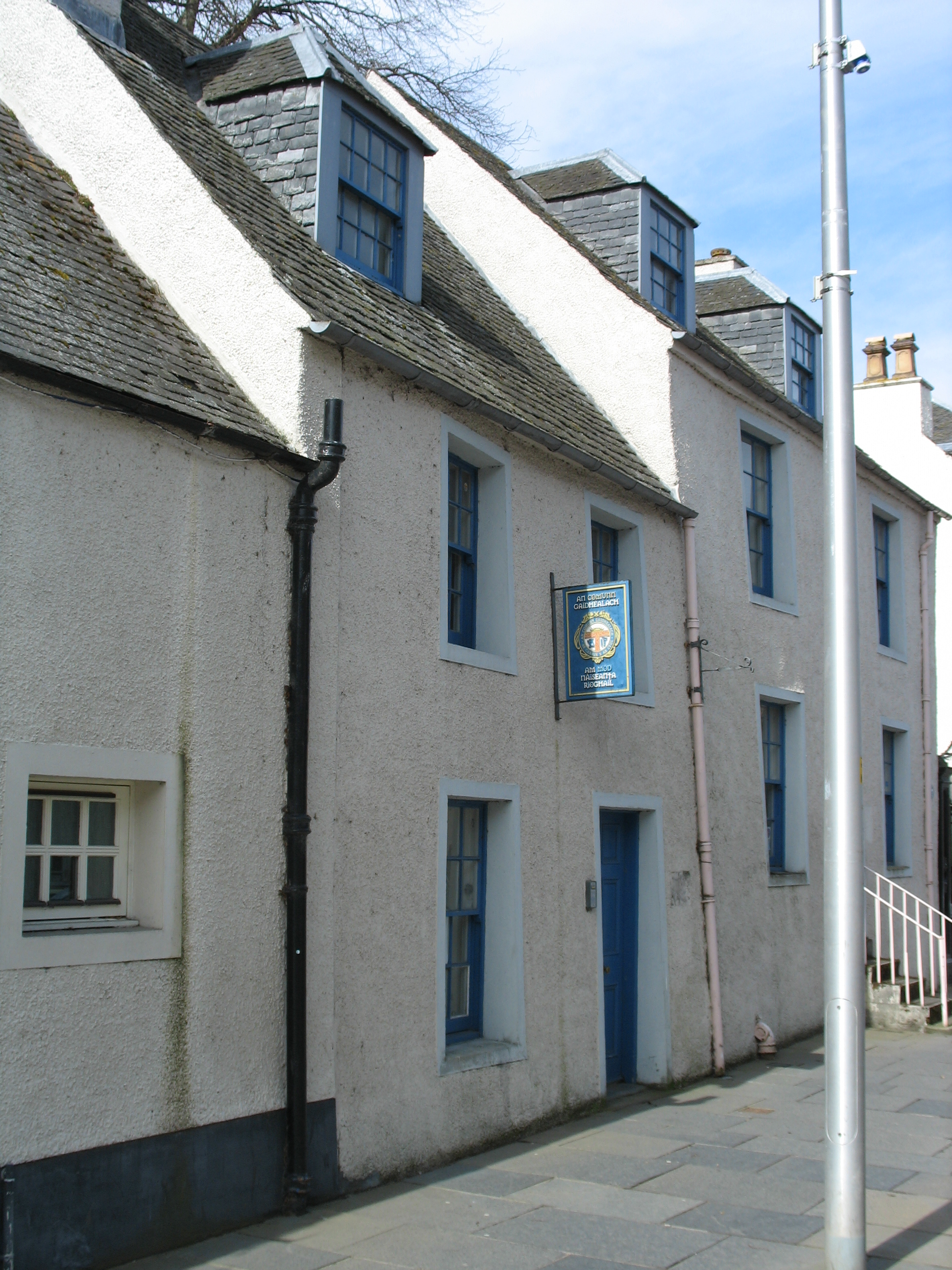
Former offices of An Comunn Gàidhealach in Inverness, now located at 5 Mitchell’s Lane, IV2 3HQ

From 1905 to 1922 An Comunn Gàidhealach published a monthly magazine titled an Deo-Grèine. This was replaced in 1923 by An Gaidheal (literally "The Gael") which ran until 1967, when it was continued by the bilingual newspaper Sruth until 1970.

Kenneth MacIver was appointed assistant director in 1974.

Its offices are in Inverness and Stornoway and its Patron is King Charles III. The organisation should not be confused with An Comunn Gàidhealach America, Comunn na Gàidhlig, or Bòrd na Gàidhlig.

== See also ==
- Conradh na Gaeilge
- Manx Gaelic Society
