= Flodigarry =

Coordinates: 57.66265°N 6.25852°W

Flodigarry: Scottish Gaelic: Flòdaigearraidh
- Location within the Isle of Skye
- OS grid reference: NG461716
- Council area: Highland
- Country: Scotland
- Sovereign state: United Kingdom
- Post town: Portree
- Postcode district: IV51 9
- Police: Scotland
- Fire: Scottish
- Ambulance: Scottish

Flodigarry (Scottish Gaelic: Flòdaigearraidh) is a scattered settlement on the north east side of the Trotternish peninsula on the island of Skye, and is in the Scottish council area of Highland.

The small island of Eilean Flodigarry (Scottish Gaelic: Eilean Fhlòdaigearraidh) lies less than one kilometre (one-half nautical mile) off the coast with Sgeir na Éireann just beyond to the northeast.

In 1750, the Jacobite Flora MacDonald and her fiancé Allan MacDonald were married and lived in a cottage in Flodigarry.

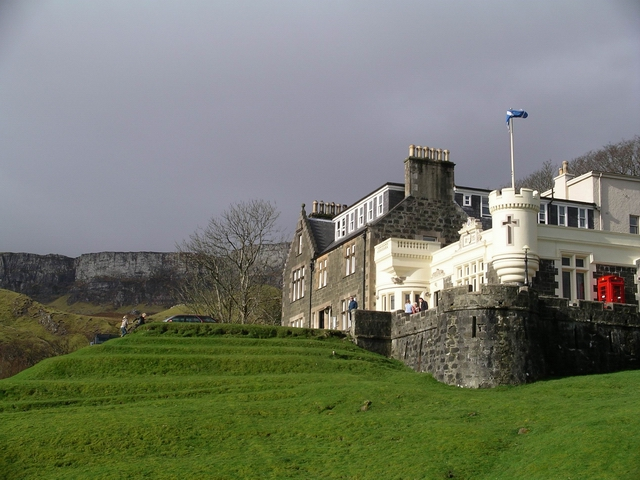
Flodigarry Hotel
