= Ellishadder =

Coordinates: 57.60703°N 6.17852°W

Ellishadder: Scottish Gaelic: Ealaiseadar
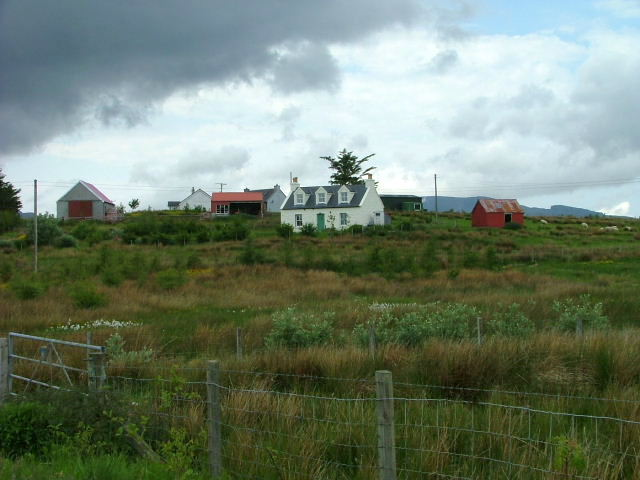
- Crofts at Ellishadder

- Location within the Isle of Skye
- OS grid reference: NG504651
- Council area: Highland
- Country: Scotland
- Sovereign state: United Kingdom
- Post town: Portree
- Postcode district: IV51 9
- Police: Scotland
- Fire: Scottish
- Ambulance: Scottish

Ellishadder (Scottish Gaelic: Ealaiseadar) is a crofting township, situated close to the north shore of the freshwater Loch Mealt, on the Trotternish peninsula of the Isle of Skye, and is in the Scottish council area of Highland. Ellishadder is one of 23 townships making up the district area of Staffin.

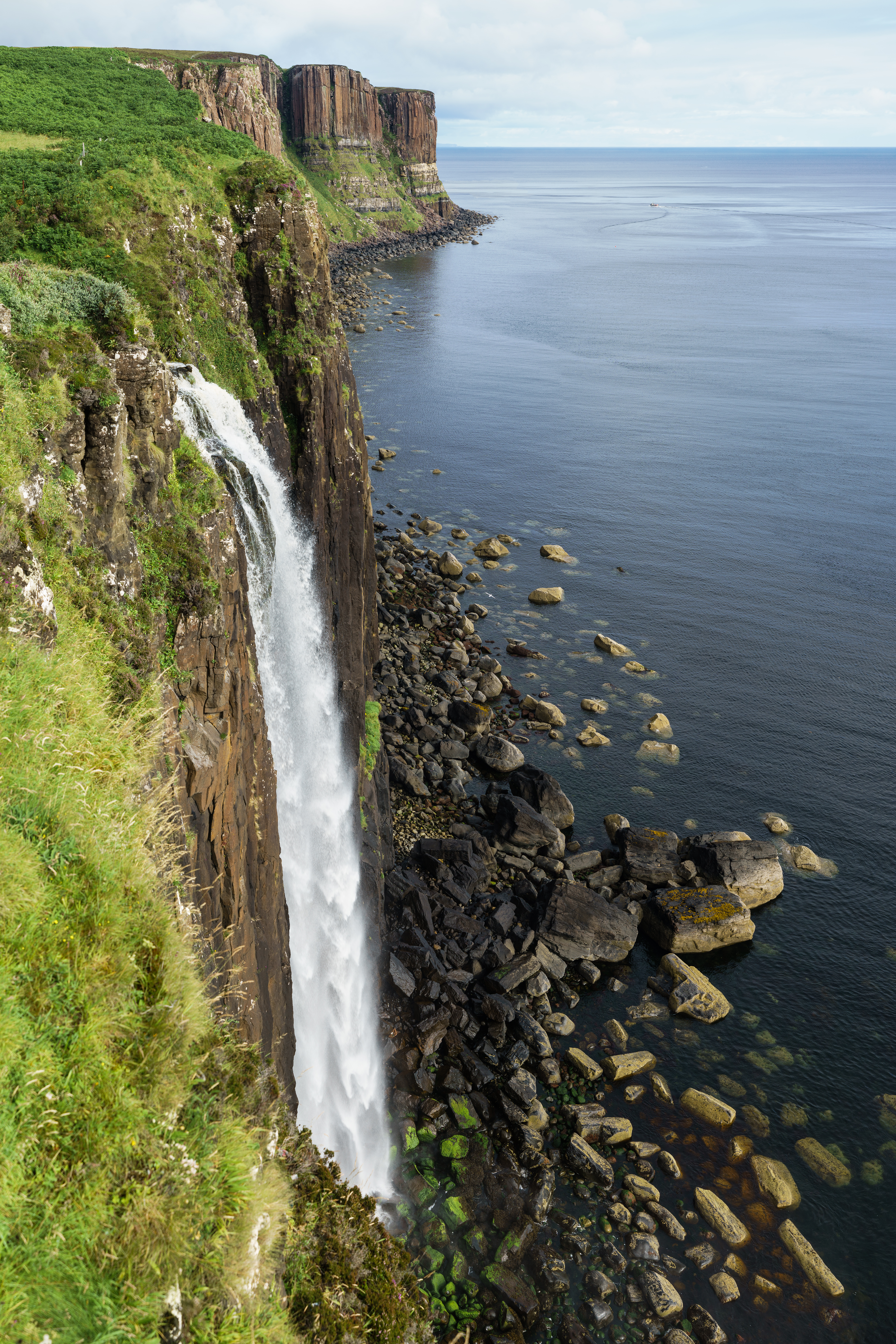
The Mealt waterfall with Kilt Rock in the background

The Kilt Rock viewpoint is situated to the east of the township, and comprises sea-cliffs 55 metres (180 ft) tall, composed of basalt/dolerite rock. The viewpoint is best known for its waterfall, Mealt Falls - the outflow of Loch Mealt.

The Staffin Museum, also situated in the east of the township, exhibits the largest collection of local dinosaur footprints and bones, amongst many local artefacts representing the social history of Trotternish. The museum was founded in 1976 by Dugald Ross, and moved to its present location, a restored byre, in 1994. The building was formerly a Gaelic school run by the church in the early 1800s.
