= 1945 Beinn Edra air disaster =

Air disaster

Coordinates: 57°35′12″N 6°15′26″W

Accident
- Date: 3 March 1945
- Summary: Controlled flight into terrain, due to poor weather
- Site: Beinn Edra, Isle of Skye, Scotland

Aircraft
- Aircraft type: Boeing B-17G Flying Fortress
- Operator: United States Army Air Force
- Registration: 44-83325
- Flight origin: Bangor, Maine
- Stopover: Meeks Field, Iceland
- Destination: RAF Valley, Wales (leg); Gioia del Colle, Italy (final)
- Occupants: 9
- Crew: 9
- Fatalities: 9 (all)

On 3 March 1945, a USAAF Boeing B-17G crashed into the side of Beinn Edra, a mountain on the Isle of Skye, Scotland during a ferry flight to Gioia del Colle, Italy.

== Flight ==
The aircraft (Serial No. 44-83325) was an unassigned Boeing B-17G, brand new off the assembly line in Long Beach, California, and was in the process of being ferried across to Italy. In the flight's first leg, the aircraft was flown from Bangor, Maine to Meeks Field in Iceland, near the present day Keflavík Airport. For the second leg, the aircraft was due to be flown from Meeks Field to RAF Valley on the island of Anglesey, in North West Wales, with RAF Prestwick and RAF Nutts Corner being selected as diversionary airfields should any serious problems have occurred during the flight.

The weather on the day of the flight was noted to be fairly good, but with a high pressure system across the British Isles, leading to low lying overcast cloud. The flight crossed the North Atlantic with no issues, making contact with RAF Stornoway as planned, before turning to follow the east coast of Scotland southwards. At approximately 13:45, the aircraft was witnessed by the residents of Staffin flying into the cloud base at 800 feet (240 m), trying to find its bearings on an east to west heading, before disappearing from view, followed by the sound of an explosion of the aircraft slamming into the eastern face of the 2,005-foot-high (611 m) Beinn Edra with all crew killed on impact.

== Crew ==
The flight was piloted by 1st Lieutenant Paul Main Overfield, Jr. and co-piloted by 2nd Lieutenant, Leroy Elmer Cagle. Also on board was 2nd Lieutenant Charles Keith Jeanblanc and Corporals Harold Duane Blue (Engineer), Harold A. Fahselt (Engineer/Gunner), Arthur W. Kopp, Jr. (Gunner), George Stroman Aldrich, Jr. (Gunner), John Henry Vaughan (Gunner), and Carter Denning Wilkinson (Gunner). All crew were between the ages of 19 and 23.

== Recovery efforts ==
Due to the isolation and where the plane crashed, recovery efforts weren't as easy as they normally would be, with the Inverness based No. 56 Maintenance Unit, wriggling wreckage free to fall down the mountain for easier extraction, whilst also contending with falling rocks, and one member being struck and injured by a falling oil cooler. The bodies of the crew were recovered and initially buried in the UK, before being repatriated to the USA by their next of kin, four of which (Aldrich, Fahselt, Vaughan, and Wilkinson) all being interred in a communal grave at the Jefferson Barracks National Cemetery, Missouri, whilst the other four are buried in their home states. Jeanblanc is the only crew member who wasn't repatriated, and is buried in the American Military Cemetery in Cambridge, England.

== Memorials ==
In 2015, the 70th anniversary of the crash, the names of the crewmen were listed on the War Memorial in the nearby village of Staffin. As well as a memorial plaque at the crash site.
