= Achachork =

Coordinates: 57.433°N 6.200°W

Achachork: Scottish Gaelic: Achadh a' Choirce
- Village
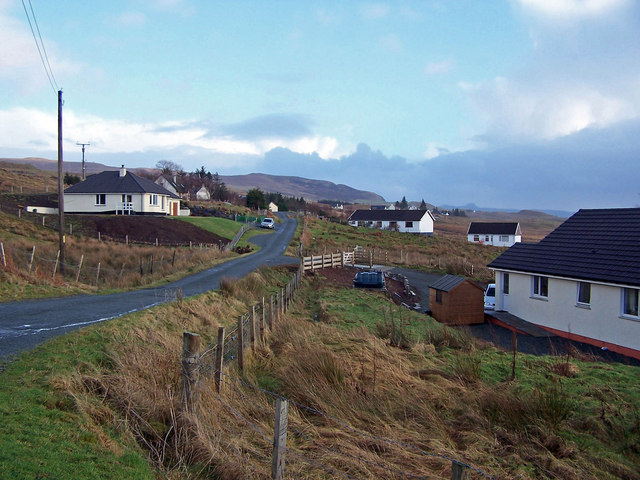
- Achachork

- Location within the Isle of Skye
- OS grid reference: NG480459
- Council area: Highland
- Country: Scotland
- Sovereign state: United Kingdom
- Postcode district: PH35
- Police: Scotland
- Fire: Scottish
- Ambulance: Scottish
- UK Parliament: Inverness, Skye and West Ross-shire
- Scottish Parliament: Skye, Lochaber and Badenoch

Achachork (Scottish Gaelic: Achadh a' Choirce) is a small village on the Isle of Skye. It is situated on the south of the Trotternish peninsula. It lies on the A855 road to the north of Portree. Robert Forrester is documented as being in Achachork in 1666.
