= Carbost, Trotternish =

Coordinates: 57.4512°N 6.28398°W

Carbost: Scottish Gaelic: Càrrabost
- Location within the Isle of Skye
- OS grid reference: NG431482
- Council area: Highland
- Country: Scotland
- Sovereign state: United Kingdom
- Postcode district: IV51 9
- Police: Scotland
- Fire: Scottish
- Ambulance: Scottish

Carbost (Scottish Gaelic: Càrrabost) is a crofting settlement at the southern end of the Trotternish peninsula on the Isle of Skye in the Highlands of Scotland. It is a few miles north west of the village of Portree and is in the council area of Highland.
