= Quiraing =

Landform in Scotland

Coordinates: 57°38′27″N 6°16′26″W

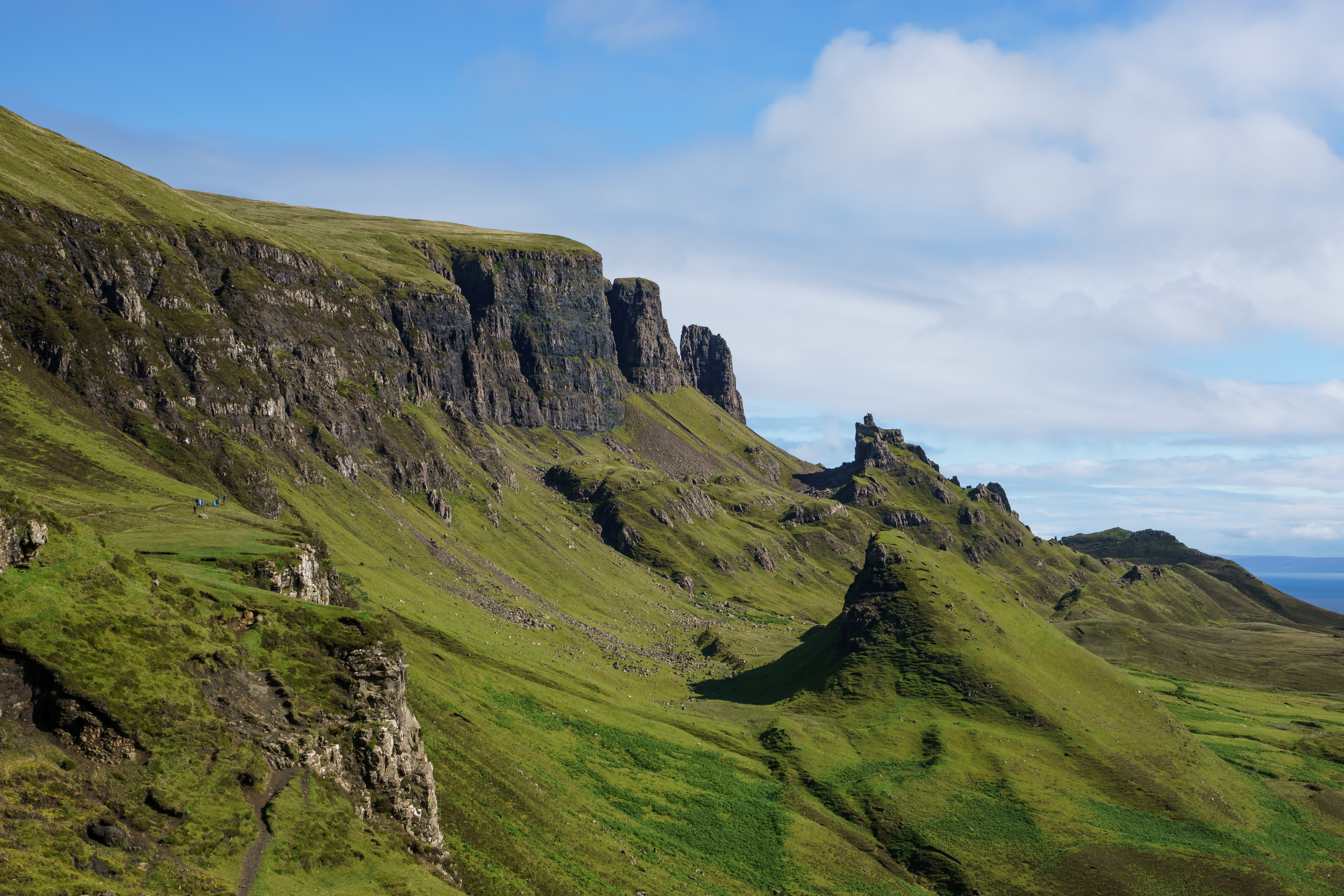
View towards the Quiraing

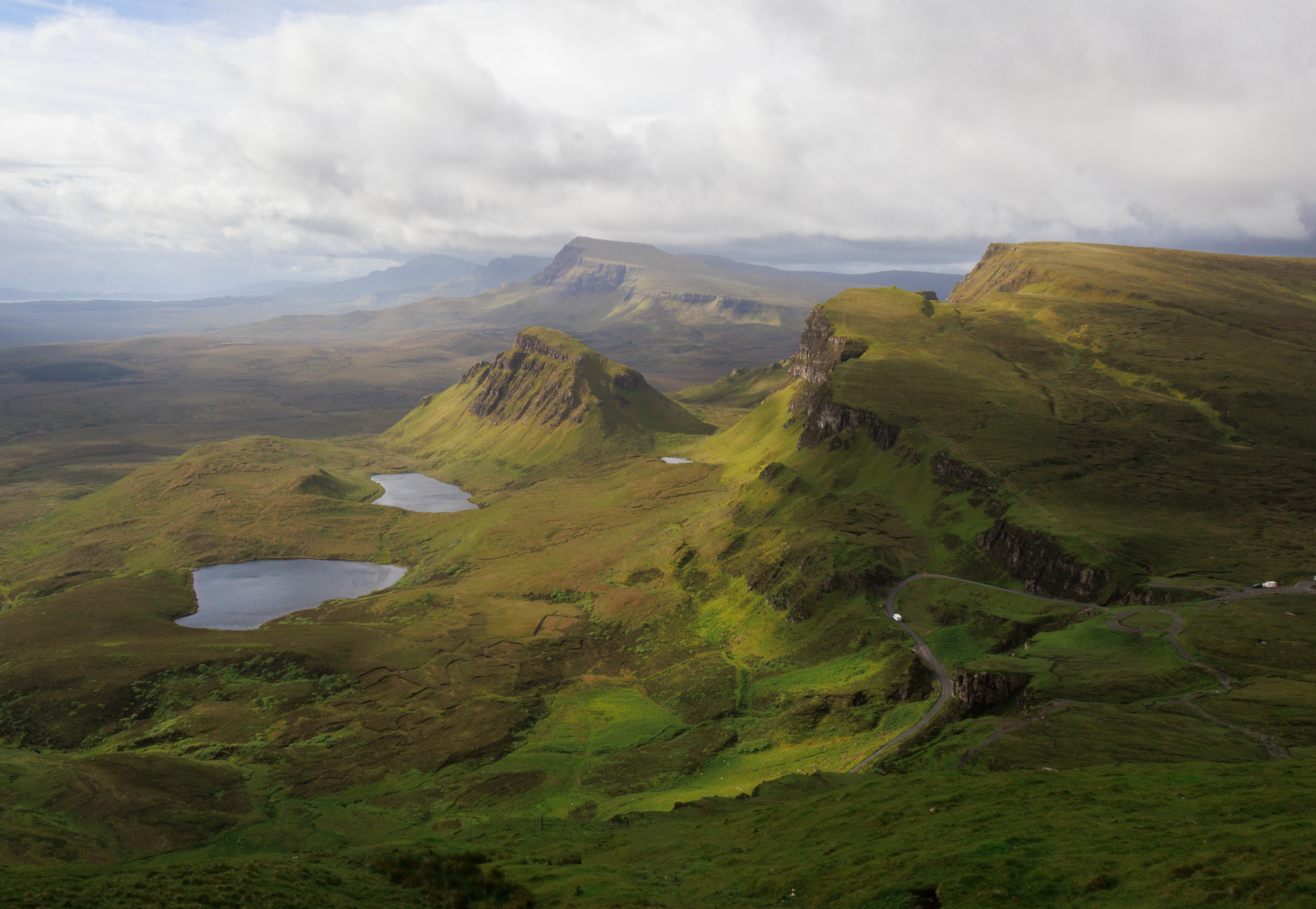
The Quiraing Circuit hike

The Quiraing (Scottish Gaelic: Cuith-Raing) is a landform on the eastern face of Meall na Suiramach, the northernmost summit of the Trotternish escarpment on the Isle of Skye, Scotland. It takes the form of a craterous hollow surrounded by a high rampart of rock. Within the hollow is a raised plateau the size of a football field, known as the Table. Other distinctive features of the landscape are the Needle, a jagged pinnacle rising to 120 feet (37 m), and the Prison, a mass of rock resembling a medieval keep. Like the rest of the Trotternish escarpment, the Quiraing was formed when a thick layer of flood basalt spread over the peninsula and destabilized the weak sedimentary rocks below, causing a succession of landslides. It has been renowned for its fantastical appearance since the Victorian period. The poet Alexander Smith dubbed it "a nightmare of nature".

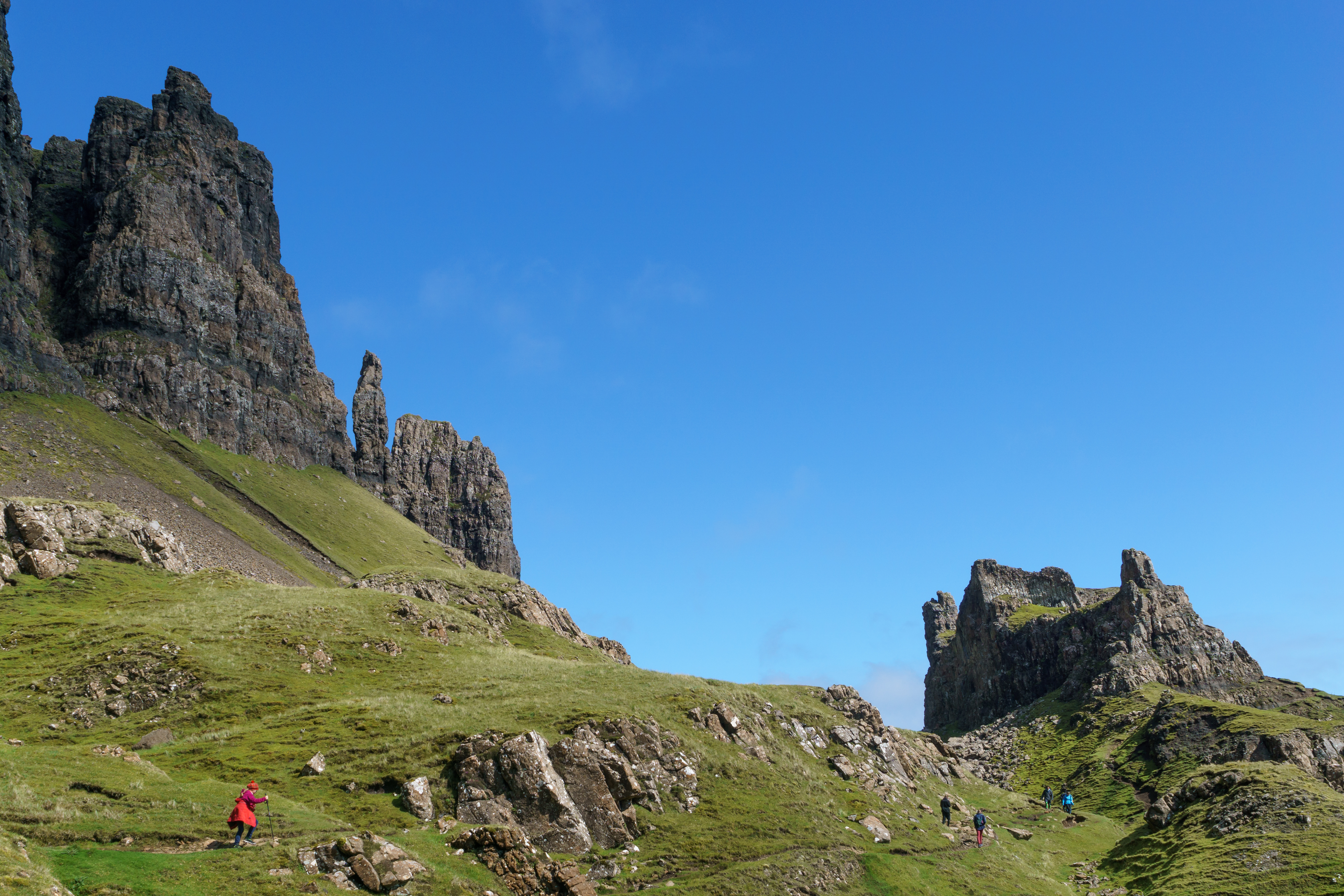
View of the Quiraing (left) and the Prison (right)

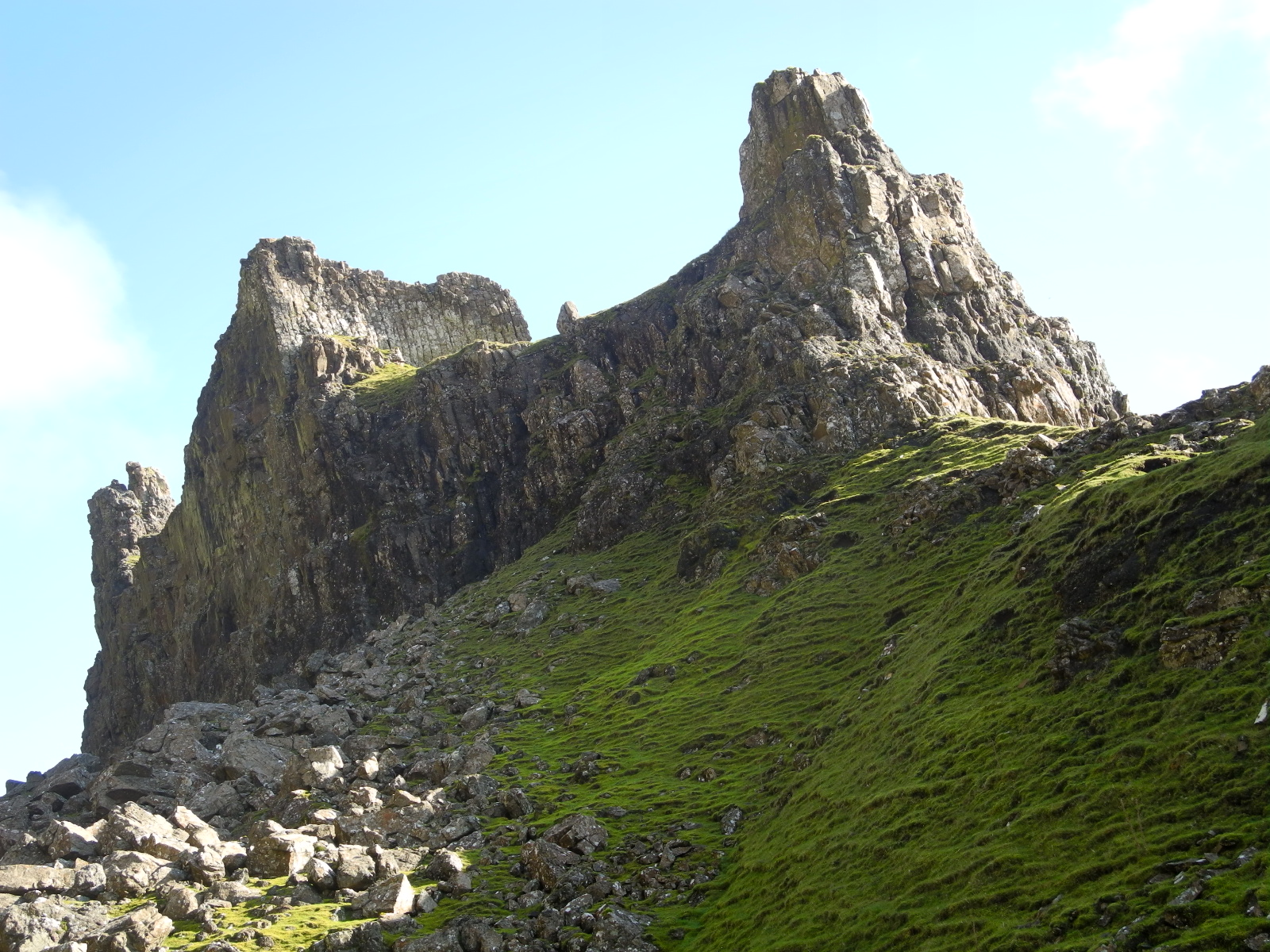
The Prison

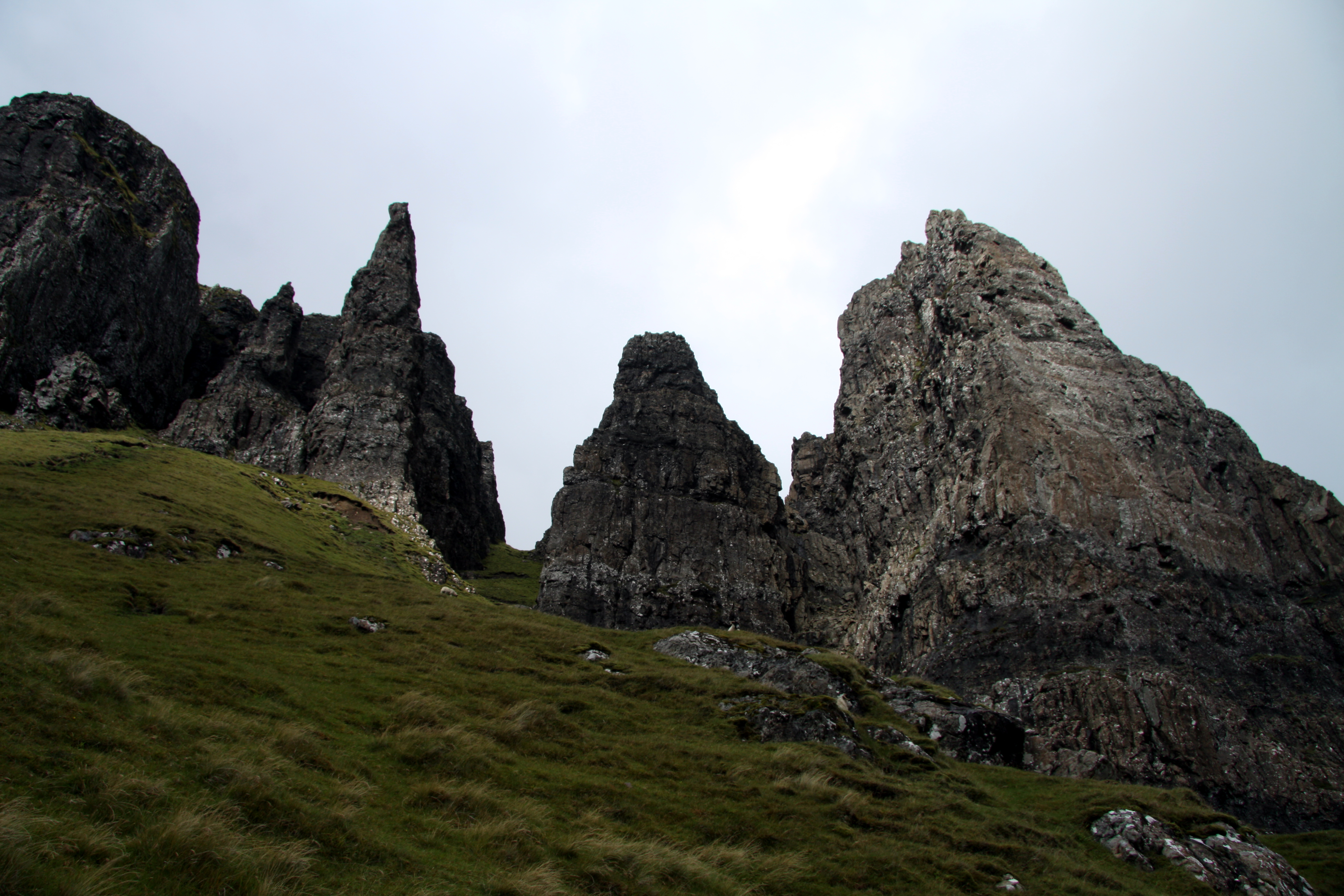
The entrance to the Quiraing

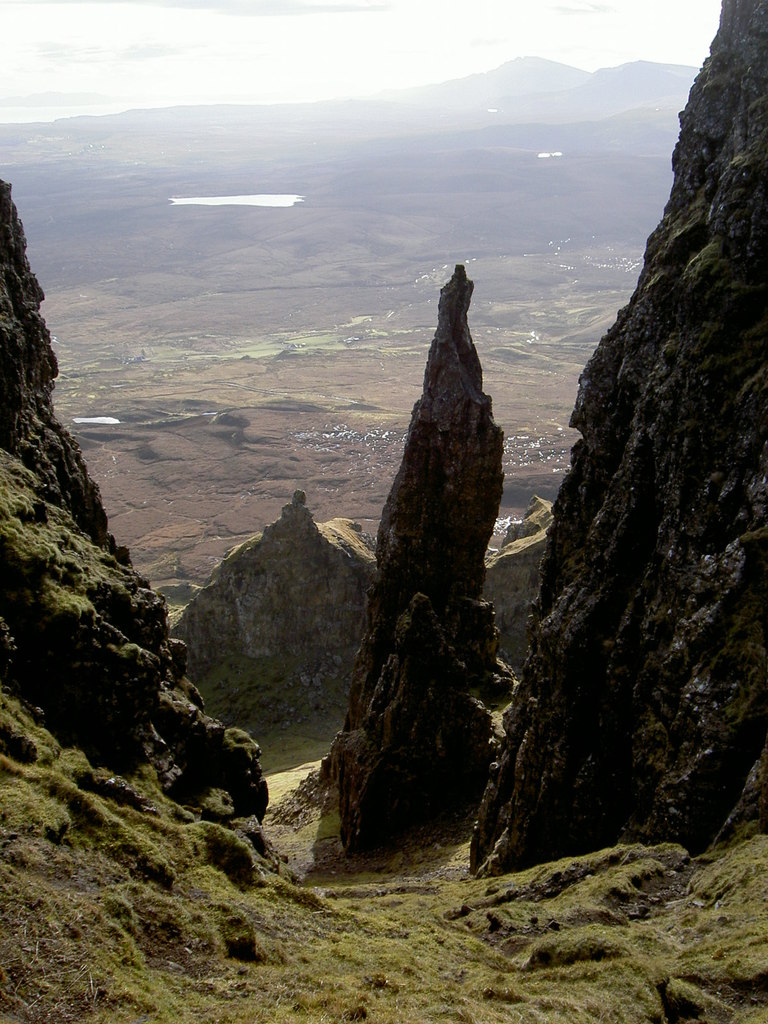
The Needle

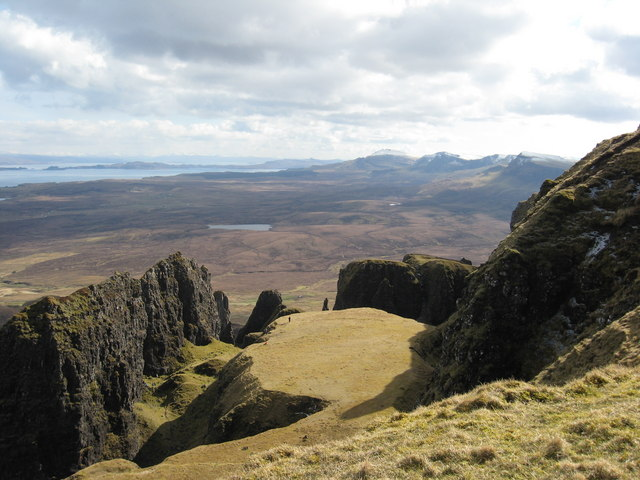
The Table
