= Uig, Snizort =

Coordinates: 57.586°N 6.357°W

Uig: Scottish Gaelic: Ùige
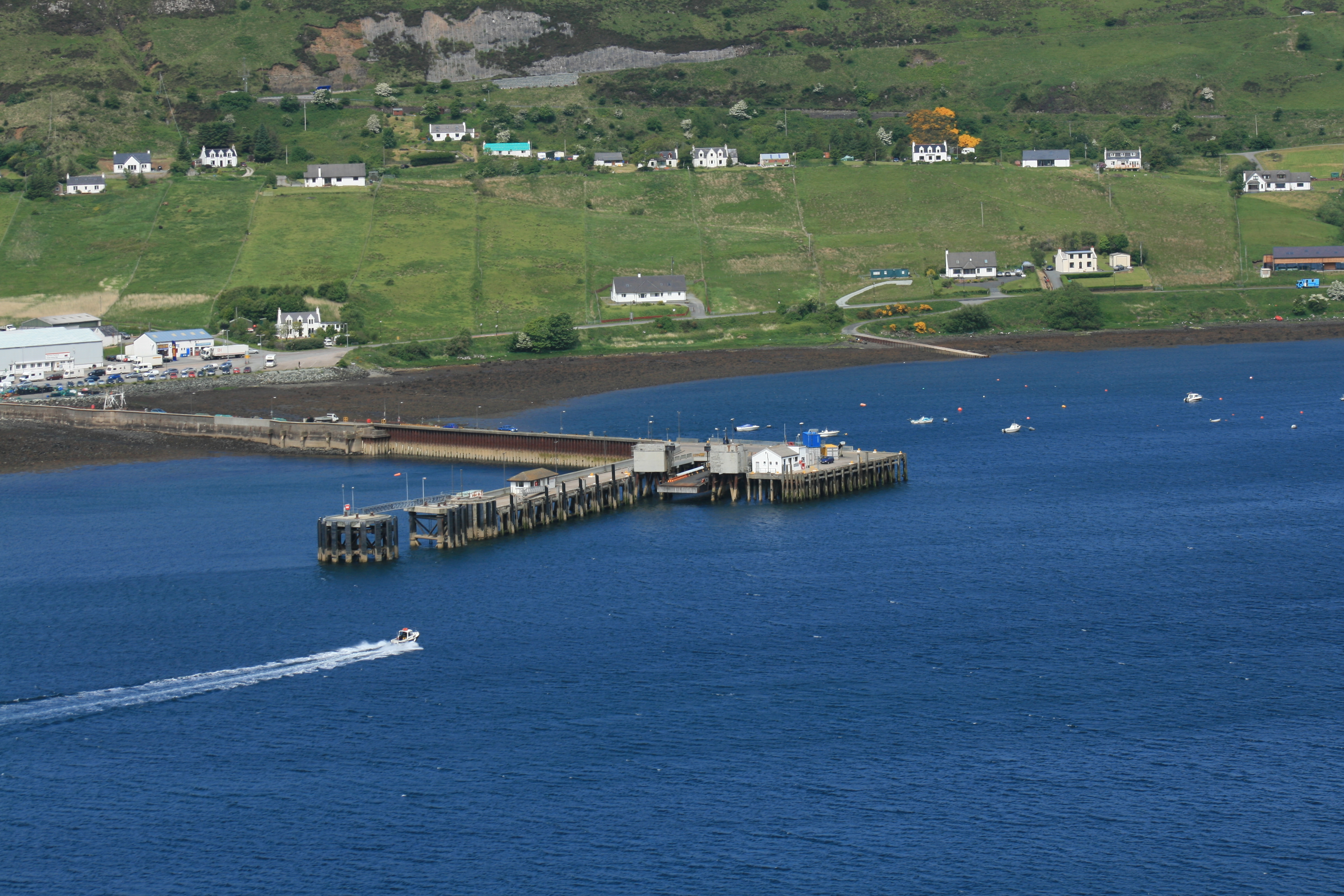
- Uig Harbour and Pier

- Location within the Isle of Skye
- Area: 54 km^{2} (21 sq mi)
- Population: 423 (2011)
  - Density: 8/km^{2} (21/sq mi)
- OS grid reference: NG396634
- Council area: Highland
- Lieutenancy area: Ross and Cromarty
- Country: Scotland
- Sovereign state: United Kingdom
- Post town: PORTREE
- Postcode district: IV51
- Dialling code: 01470
- Police: Scotland
- Fire: Scottish
- Ambulance: Scottish
- UK Parliament: Inverness, Skye and West Ross-shire
- Scottish Parliament: Skye, Lochaber and Badenoch

Uig (Scottish Gaelic: Ùige [ˈuːkʲə]) is a village at the head of Uig Bay on the west coast of the Trotternish peninsula on the Isle of Skye, Scotland. In 2011 it had a population of 423.

== Name ==
The name is thought to be derived from Old Norse vík, which means bay or inlet. Borrowed via Germanic intermediary *wīkō ('harbour town') from Latin vīcus (Classical Latin: [ˈu̯iːkʊs̠], 'village'), Uig shares etymological roots with placenames such as Wick, Highland; Vik, Sogn og Fjordane, Norway; Vík í Mýrdal, Iceland; the suffix -wich, and the word village itself.

== Geography ==
Uig is situated partly on the raised beach around the head of the bay and partly on the steep slopes behind it. Two watercourses enter the bay at Uig: the River Rha from the north and the River Conon which drains Glen Uig to the east. The lower courses of both of these small rivers are characterised by waterfalls.

Uig Tower is a prominent local landmark associated with the Highland Clearances.

Uigg, Prince Edward Island, Canada was named by settlers from Uig.

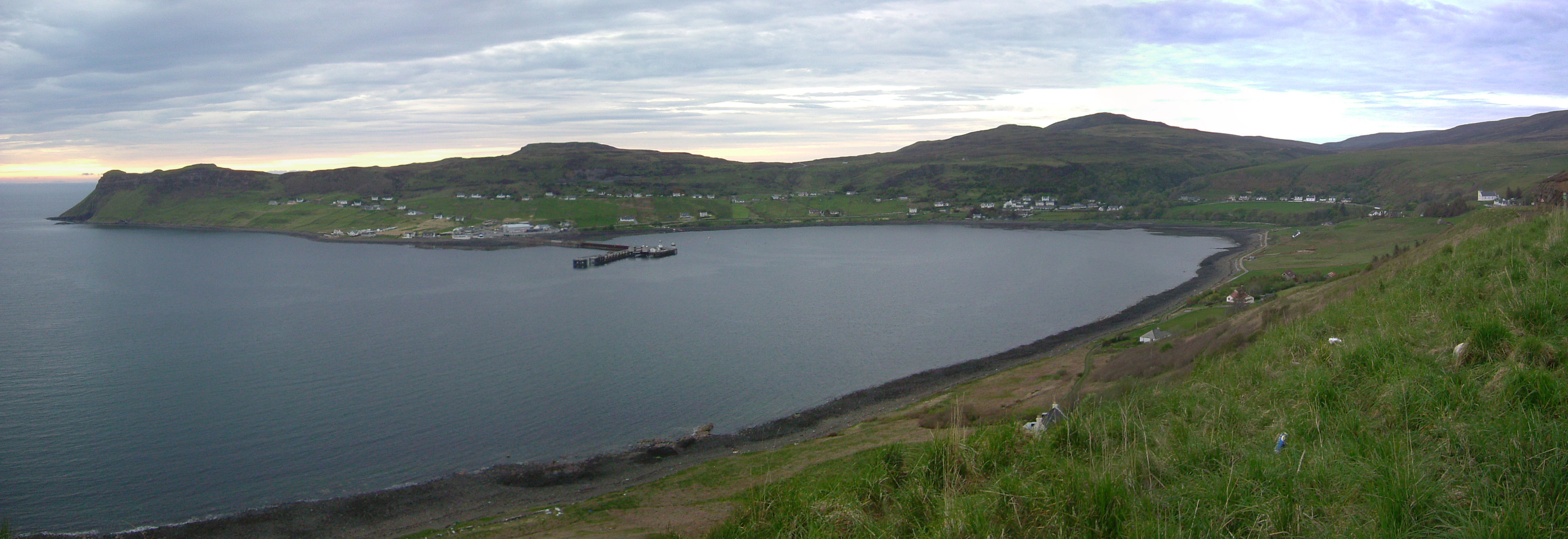
Uig harbour and village

== Transport ==
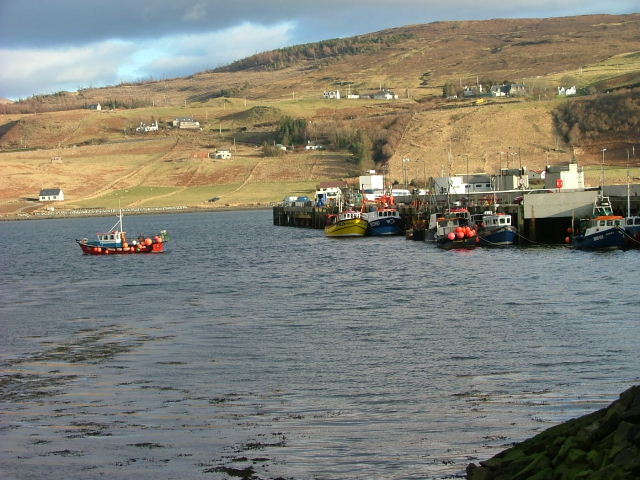
Uig pier

=== Road ===
Uig is served by the A87 road from Portree and Kyle of Lochalsh to the south, and the A855 road which runs northwards around the end of the Trotternish peninsula before also turning south to Portree. Uig is also served by the local 57A and 57C buses from Portree and Trotternish, and daily Scottish Citylink buses, service 915 and 916, which travel from Glasgow via Fort William and Kyle of Lochalsh.

=== Ferries ===
From its sheltered port, Caledonian MacBrayne ferries run to Tarbert on Harris and Lochmaddy on North Uist, providing links with the Outer Hebrides. Ferries leave from the pier, which is under the control of Highland Harbours, which is run by the Highland Council.

Preceding station	Caledonian MacBrayne	Following station
Lochmaddy Terminus	North Uist ferry	Terminus
Tarbert Terminus	Harris ferry	Terminus

== Sources ==
- Macleod, Roderick (1845). "Parish of Snizort". The new statistical account of Scotland. [electronic resource]. Edinburgh and London: William Blackwood and Sons. pp. 287-295.
