= Comunn na Gàidhlig =

The Gaelic Society Comunn na Gàidhlig
- Abbreviation: CnaG
- Formation: 1984
- Founder: Scottish Office
- Type: Scottish Gaelic language Language revival
- Headquarters: Stornoway, Isle of Lewis
- Website: www.cnag.org/index.php/en/

Comunn na Gàidhlig (lit. 'Gaelic Society'), abbreviated to "CnaG", is an organisation which seeks to promote Scottish Gaelic language and culture.

== History ==
Comunn na Gàidhlig was founded in 1984 by the Scottish Office to co-ordinate new developments in Gaelic language policy. It has charitable status. It has offices in Stornoway, Inverness, Glasgow, and additional staff based in Uist, Skye, Islay, Edinburgh and Lochaber. Its chief executive is Dòmhnall MacNèill.

Comunn na Gàidhlig should not be confused with An Comunn Gàidhealach, which has a broader cultural remit, or Bòrd na Gàidhlig, a quango.
