= Kilmuir, Skye =

Coordinates: 57.649°N 6.385°W

Kilmuir: Scottish Gaelic: Cille Mhoire
- Location within the Isle of Skye
- OS grid reference: NG384706
- Council area: Highland
- Country: Scotland
- Sovereign state: United Kingdom
- Post town: Kilmuir
- Postcode district: IV51 9YS
- Police: Scotland
- Fire: Scottish
- Ambulance: Scottish

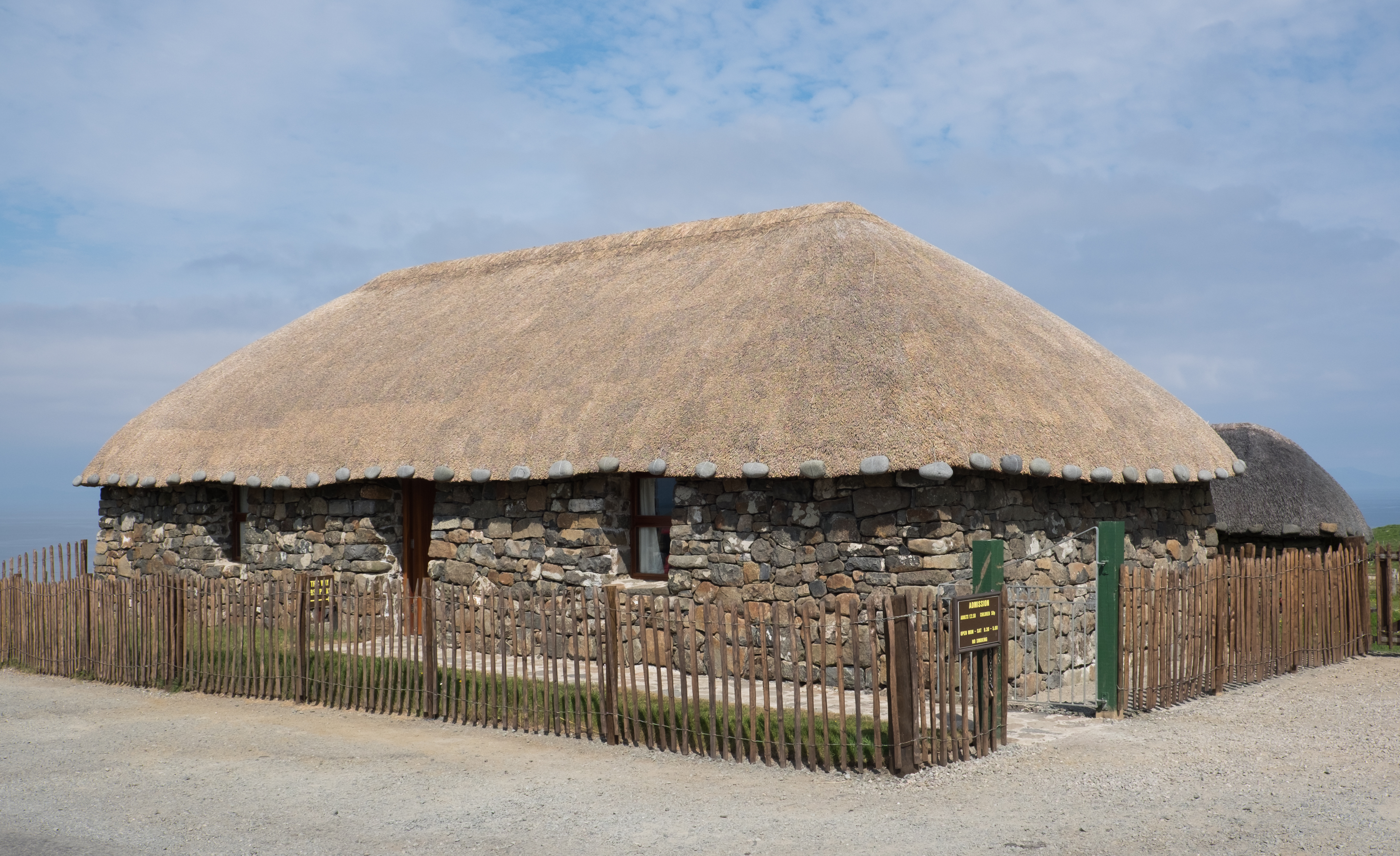
Skye Museum of Island Life

Kilmuir (Scottish Gaelic: Cille Mhoire) is a village on the west coast of the Trotternish peninsula in the north of the island of Skye, and a civil parish covering the north of the peninsula. It is in the Scottish council area of Highland and is the only place in Scotland (apart from the Western Isles) where Scottish Gaelic is spoken by about half of the population.

== History ==
Within the parish lies Blàr a' Bhuailte (grid reference NG4467), the "field of the stricken", where Vikings are said to have made their last stand in Skye near Loch Leum na Luirginn.

== Notable people ==
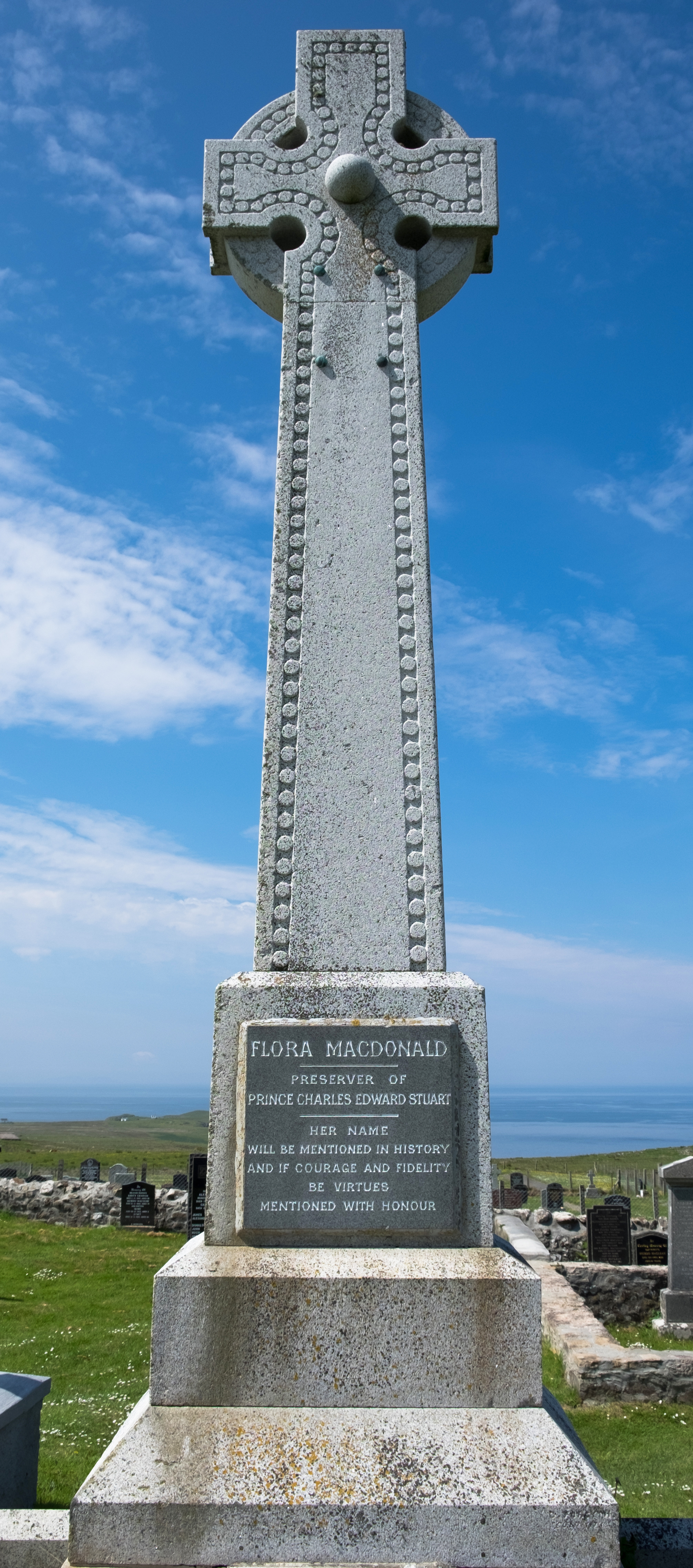
Flora MacDonald Monument

Flora MacDonald, who assisted Bonnie Prince Charlie to escape from Scotland after his defeat at Culloden, is buried here, and fashion designer Alexander McQueen has his headstone here.
