= Portree =

Town on the Isle of Skye, Scotland

Coordinates: 57.412°N 6.192°W

Portree: Scottish Gaelic: Port Rìgh
- Town
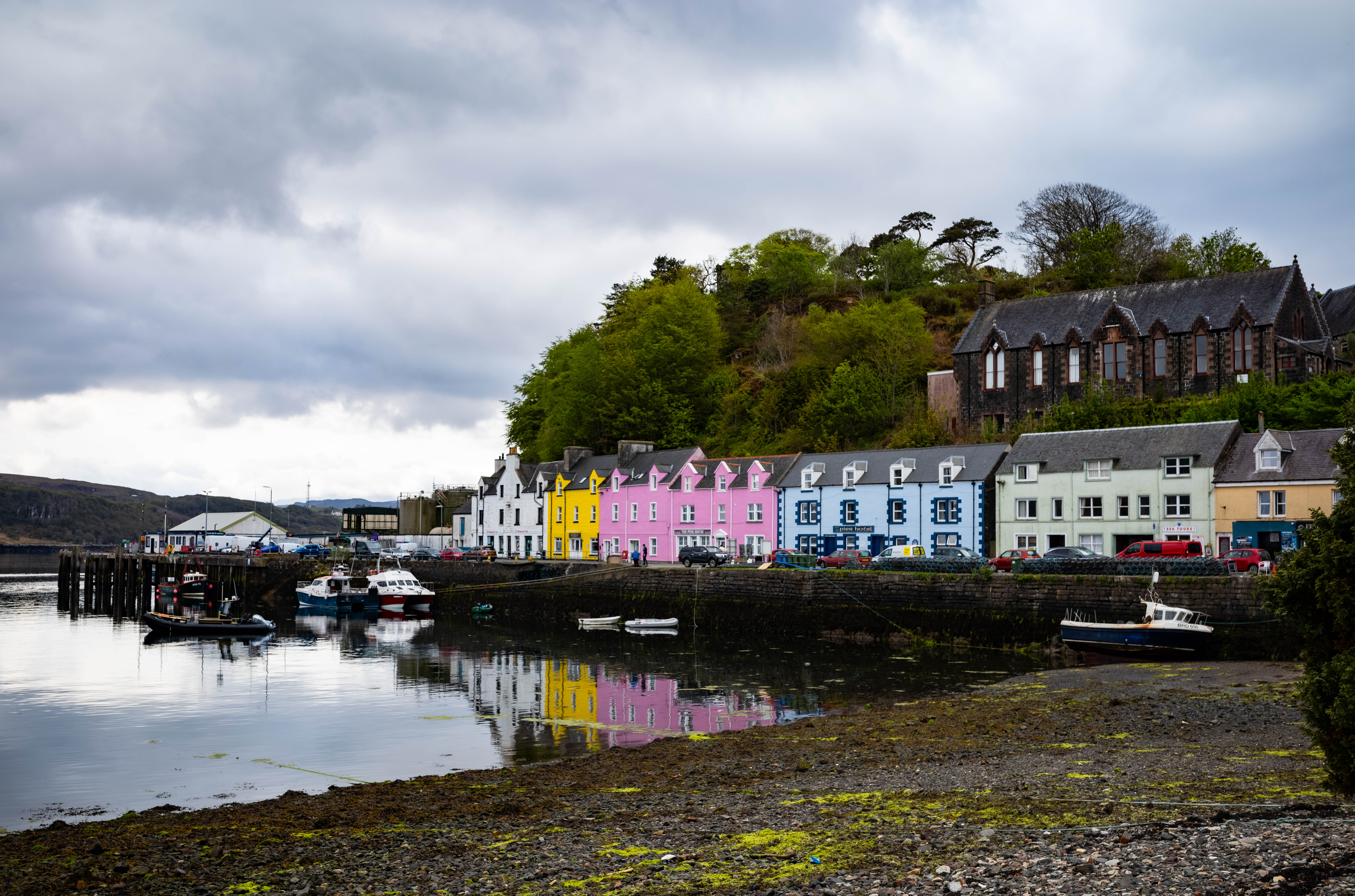
- Portree Harbour

- Location within the Isle of Skye
- Population: 2,281 (2022)
- OS grid reference: NG483454
  - Edinburgh: 152 mi (245 km)
  - London: 475 mi (764 km)
- Council area: Highland
- Lieutenancy area: Ross and Cromarty
- Country: Scotland
- Sovereign state: United Kingdom
- Post town: PORTREE
- Postcode district: IV51
- Dialling code: 01478
- Police: Scotland
- Fire: Scottish
- Ambulance: Scottish
- UK Parliament: Inverness, Skye and West Ross-shire
- Scottish Parliament: Skye, Lochaber & Badenoch

Portree (/pɔːrˈtriː/; Scottish Gaelic: Port Rìgh, pronounced [pʰɔrˠʃt̪ˈɾiː]) is a harbour town and civil parish in the Inner Hebrides of Scotland. It is the main town and largest community in the Isle of Skye, and lies within the Highland council area, around 74 miles (119 km) from its administrative centre of Inverness. It had a population of 2,281 in 2022. Around 939 people (37.72% of the population) can speak Scottish Gaelic.

Portree has a harbour, fringed by cliffs, with a pier designed by Thomas Telford. Attractions in the town include the former Aros Centre, now the Isle of Skye Candle Co. Visitor Centre, which celebrates the island's Gaelic heritage. Further arts provision is made through arts organisation ATLAS Arts, a Creative Scotland regularly-funded organisation. The town also serves as a centre for tourists exploring the island.

Portree is connected to the Skye Bridge by the A87 road, which then leads northwards to Uig. The A855 road also leads north out of the town, passing through villages such as Achachork and Staffin and then passes the rocky landscape of the Storr before reaching the landslip of the Quiraing.

== Etymology ==
The current name, Port Rìgh translates as 'king's port', possibly from a visit by King James V of Scotland in 1540. However this etymology has been contested, since James did not arrive in peaceful times. The older name appears to have been Port Ruighe(adh), meaning 'slope harbour'.

Prior to the 16th century the settlement's name was Kiltaraglen ('the church of St. Talarican') from Gaelic Cill Targhlain.

== Prehistory and archaeology ==
Archaeological investigations in advance of construction of a housing development in 2006–2007, by CFA Archaeology, uncovered evidence of occupation of Portree from the Early Bronze Age to the Medieval period (the earliest radiocarbon date was 2570 BC, and the latest was AD 1400). They also found stone tools that indicated people were in the area in the Early to Mid Neolithic, possibly as far back as the Late Mesolithic.

The archaeologists discovered the remains of timber roundhouses, a circular ditch-defined enclosure, miniature souterrains, probable standing stone sockets and an assortment of pits. While not many artefacts were recovered there was an assemblage of Beaker pottery. This was the first discovery of a site dating from the Later Bronze Age on the Isle of Skye.

The archaeologists also found evidence of the shooting range that was created in the 1800s with the formation of the Rifle Volunteer movement, set up in 1859 to defend the country against a potential French invasion. The first official unit in Portree was the 8th Inverness-shire Rifle Volunteer Corps, formed in July 1867.

== History ==
In the 1700s, the town was a popular point of departure for Scots sailing to America to escape poverty. This form of use repeated during the famine in the 1840s. Both times, the town was saved by an influx of boats, often going between mainland Scotland and the Outer Hebrides, who used Portree's pier as a rest point. The town also began exporting fish at this time, which contributed greatly to the local economy.

The Royal Hotel is the site of MacNab's Inn, the last meeting place of Flora MacDonald and Bonnie Prince Charlie in 1746.

The town had the last manual telephone exchange in the UK, which closed in 1976.

== Mills and manufacturing ==
The Town formerly had a woolen mill, a grain mill and a saw mill. The woolen mill was on Mill Road and was called Skye Woolen Mill. The saw mill was on Struan Road and the grain mill was located on Scorrybreac Road.

=== Skye Woolen Mill ===
Skye Woolen Mill on Mill Road produced products made of Skye tartan and had a Shop and Cafe. The Mill closed down on 14 January 2000 and the premises has been unused since. One of the outbuildings has now been converted into a Bakery and Art Gallery. There was a pond that had a river flowing into the building which powered the building and potentially the outbuildings.

== Tourism ==
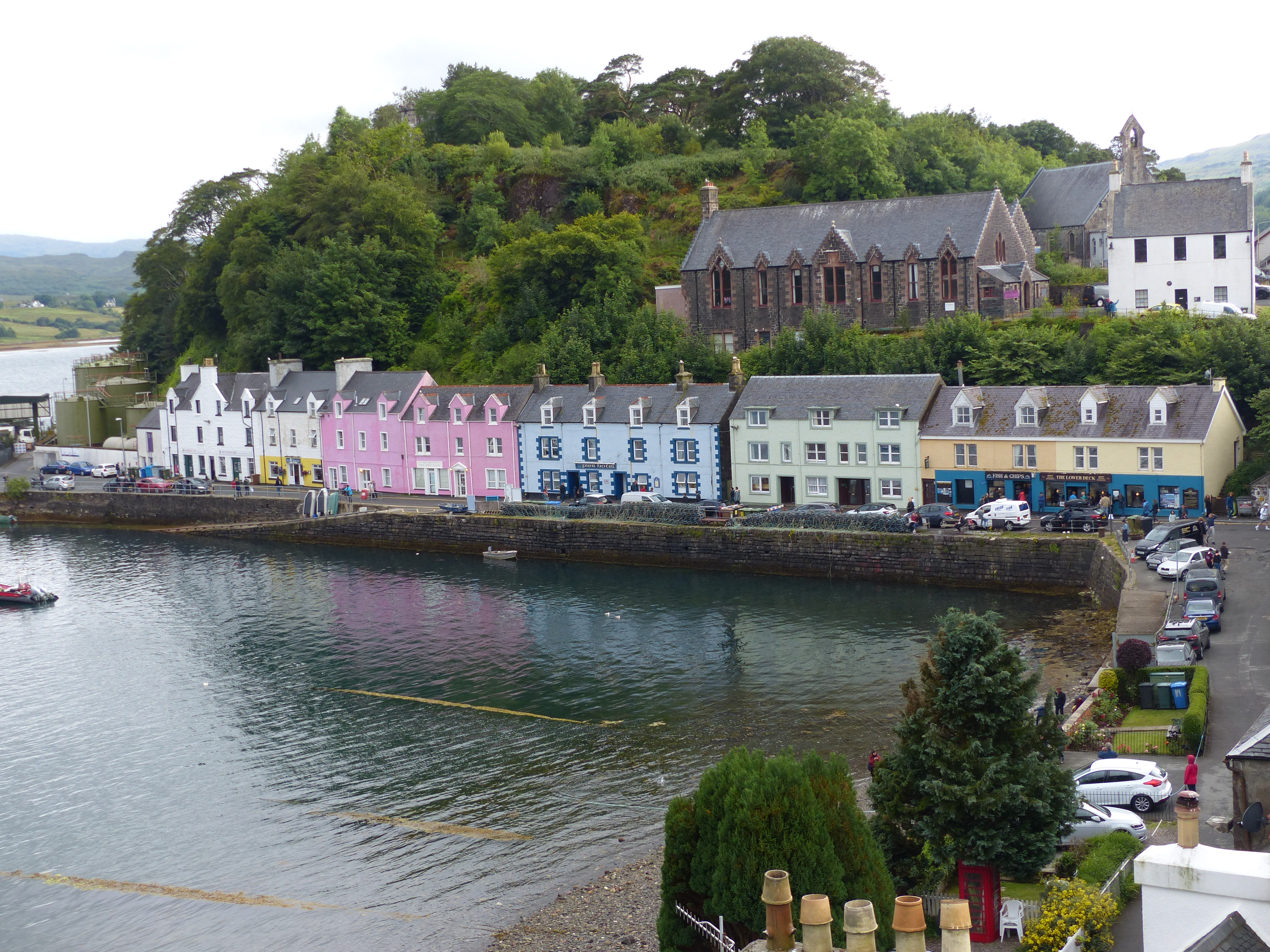
Portree (2018)

Portree is considered to be among the "20 most beautiful villages in the UK and Ireland" according to Condé Nast Traveler and is visited by many tourists each year.

A report published in mid 2020 indicated that visitors added £211 million in a single year to the Isle of Skye's economy, prior to travel restrictions imposed because of the COVID-19 pandemic. This was expected to decline substantially due to the COVID-19 pandemic. "Skye is highly vulnerable to the downturn in international visitors that will continue for much of 2020 and beyond", Professor John Lennon of Glasgow Caledonian University told a reporter in July 2020.

In 2016, over 150,000 people stopped at the VisitScotland centre in Portree, a 5% increase over 2015. Overcrowding during peak season was a problem, however, before the pandemic, since it is "the busiest place on the island". One news item recommended that some tourists might prefer accommodations in quieter areas such as Dunvegan, Kyleakin and the Broadford and Breakish area.

The 2020 reports did not cover tourism in Portree specifically but a December 2018 report by well-known travel writer Rick Steves had recommended the village as "Skye's best home base" for visitors. He indicated that Portree "provided a few hotels, hostels and bed-and-breakfasts in town, while more B&Bs line the roads into and out of town". The tourism bureau added that visitors would appreciate the "banks, churches, cafes and restaurants, a cinema at the Aros Centre, a swimming pool and library, (...) petrol filling stations and supermarkets".

== Media ==
Local news and television programmes are provided by BBC Scotland and STV North (formerly Grampian Television). Television signals are received from one of the local relay transmitters (Penifiler and Skriaig).

Portree is served by nation-wide stations, BBC Radio Scotland on 92.9 FM and BBC Radio Nan Gaidheal (for Gaelic listeners) on 104.7 FM. The local radio station Radio Skye is a community based station that broadcasts to the Isle Of Skye and Loch Alsh on 106.2 FM and 102.7 FM.

== Education ==
Portree now has 6 schools. This includes 2 primary schools (Portree Primary School and Portree Gaelic Primary School) one high school (Portree High School) one nursery (Portree Nursery) one Pre-school (Portree Pre-school) and one college (Portree College).

== Sport ==
The town plays host to the Isle of Skye's shinty club, Skye Camanachd. They play at Pairc nan Laoch above the town on the road to Struan.

Portree is home to two football clubs that play in the Skye and Lochalsh amateur football league called Portree and Portree Juniors.

Portree is now home to a new youth football club, Skye Young Boys.

== Climate ==
Like most of the British Isles, Portree has an oceanic climate (Köppen: Cfb). The nearest weather station to Portree is located at Prabost, approximately 5 1/2 miles (9 km) north-west of Portree.

Climate data for Prabost (67 metres or 220 feet asl, averages 1981-2010)
Month	Jan	Feb	Mar	Apr	May	Jun	Jul	Aug	Sep	Oct	Nov	Dec	Year
Mean daily maximum °C (°F)	6.4 (43.5)	6.8 (44.2)	8.2 (46.8)	10.8 (51.4)	13.9 (57.0)	15.5 (59.9)	16.8 (62.2)	16.8 (62.2)	14.7 (58.5)	11.7 (53.1)	8.7 (47.7)	6.7 (44.1)	11.4 (52.6)
Daily mean °C (°F)	4.0 (39.2)	4.1 (39.4)	5.3 (41.5)	7.3 (45.1)	10.0 (50.0)	12.0 (53.6)	13.7 (56.7)	13.6 (56.5)	11.6 (52.9)	8.9 (48.0)	6.3 (43.3)	4.2 (39.6)	8.4 (47.2)
Mean daily minimum °C (°F)	1.6 (34.9)	1.5 (34.7)	2.3 (36.1)	3.9 (39.0)	6.1 (43.0)	8.5 (47.3)	10.5 (50.9)	10.4 (50.7)	8.5 (47.3)	6.2 (43.2)	3.8 (38.8)	1.7 (35.1)	5.4 (41.8)
Average rainfall mm (inches)	211.2 (8.31)	158.2 (6.23)	160.4 (6.31)	93.9 (3.70)	79.2 (3.12)	81.4 (3.20)	106.7 (4.20)	129.3 (5.09)	169.6 (6.68)	209.2 (8.24)	209.3 (8.24)	197.8 (7.79)	1,806.2 (71.11)
Average rainy days (≥ 1 mm)	21.8	18.5	21.1	14.7	13.8	14.4	16.5	17.6	19.0	23.3	21.9	20.7	223.3
Mean monthly sunshine hours	34.2	61.1	93.0	138.6	195.9	155.9	128.6	115.2	97.5	68.7	37.7	34.0	1,160.4
Source: Met Office

== Portree shale ==
Portree shale is a geologic association in the vicinity of Portree, the existence of which is linked with potential petroleum occurrences of commercial importance.
