= Skye Live Festival =

Music festival at The Lump, Scotland

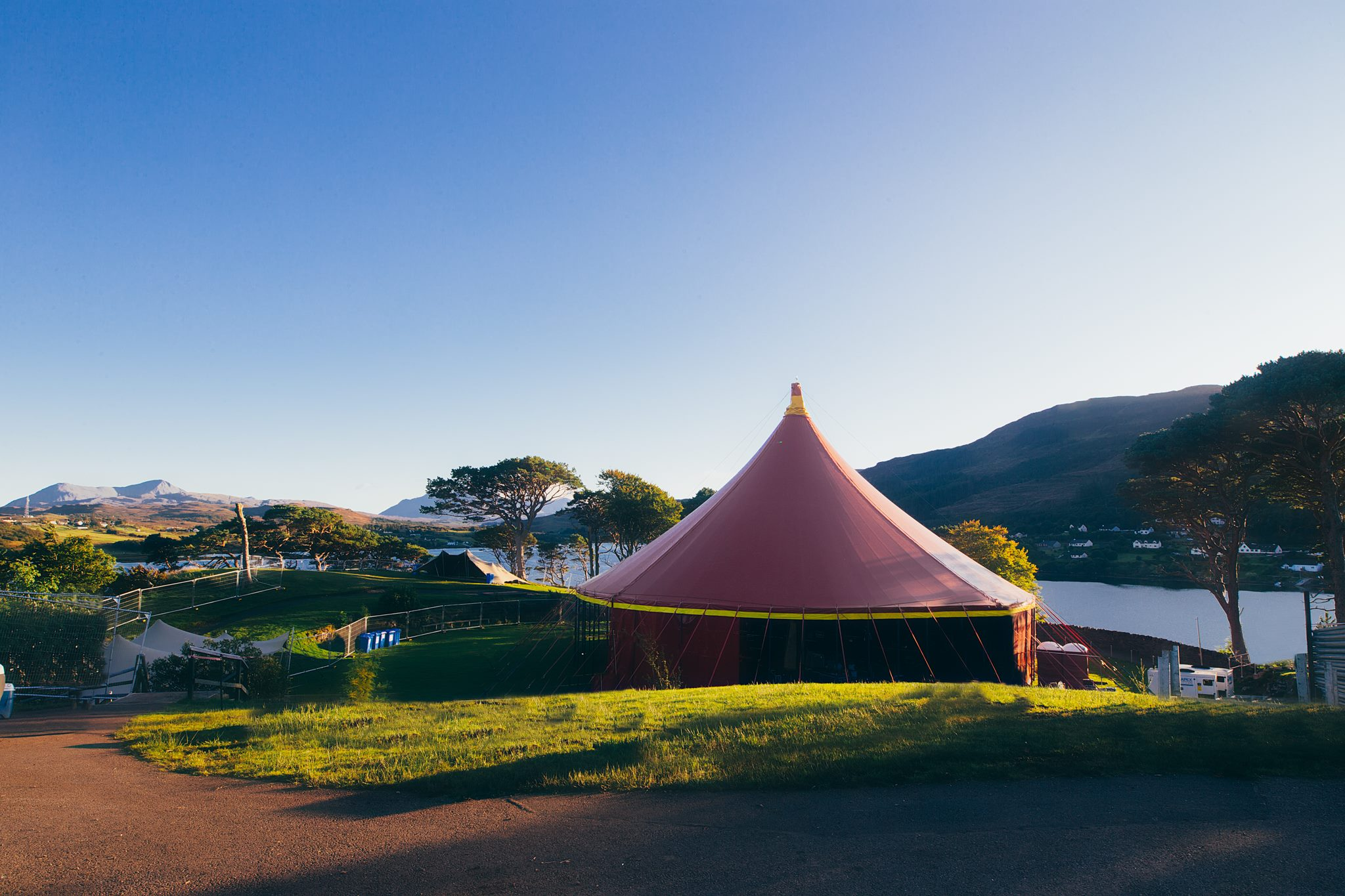
- Genre: Traditional, Folk, Indie, Electronic
- Dates: 13-14 May 2022
- Locations: The Lump, Portree, Isle of Skye, Scotland
- Years active: 2015 - Present
- Website: skyelive.co.uk

Skye Live Festival is an annual two-day music festival taking place at The Lump, the traditional home of the Skye Highland Games, in Portree on the Isle of Skye in Scotland.

== Overview ==
The festival was established in 2015 with organisers hoping to "fill the void" left by the since defunct Isle of Skye Music Festival. The first year's festival featured one stage, with performances from DJs on the Friday and bands on the Saturday. Bands appearing including Skye's own Peatbog Faeries, Donnie Munro and Niteworks, with DJs including Andrew Weatherall and Hot Chip on the Friday night.

In 2016, the festival changed sites to the King George V Park in Portree, with a view to expanding capacity and offering to two stages. It featured performances from Public Service Broadcasting, Capercaillie, Treacherous Orchestra, Bicep_(duo), Simian Mobile Disco and more.

While the 2016 location enabled a greater capacity, organisers felt it lacked the "iconic" status of the original site and so returned in 2017, while retaining a second stage, hosted by the Apocathery Tower overlooking Portree Harbour. The festival was headlined by Mercury Prize nominees Django Django. The festival was a critical success, declared "a unique and essential festival experience".

The festival's 2018 edition featured performances from Session A9, Denis Sulta, Pictish Trail and other.

2019's edition of the festival saw the addition of a third day of programming, with the festival taking place from Thursday 5th until Saturday 7 September 2019. The new Thursday's programming took the form of an opening concert featuring a performance from The Waterboys. Appearances across the Friday and Saturday included Niteworks, Peatbog Faeries, Tide Lines, Lau_(band), Erol Alkan and Optimo (Espacio).

The festival was forced to take initially due to grounds works on the site in 2020, and then again in 2021 due to the COVID-19_pandemic. In July 2021 Skye Live broadcast a free online festival featuring performances by Sian_(band), Brìghde_Chaimbeul & Aidan_O'Rourke_(musician), Lord Of The Isles (feat. Ellen Renton) and Niteworks. The performances were shot at various locations across Skye, including the Quiraing and The_Storr. During the broadcast the dates for an in person return of the festival were announced as 13 and 14 May 2022.
