= Valtos =

Valtos can refer to:

- Bhaltos, Lewis or Valtos, the largest village in Uig, Lewis in the Outer Hebrides
- Valtos Province in Aetolia-Acarnania in western Greece
- Valtos, Skye, a village on the Isle of Skye
- Valtos Sandstone Formation, a geological formation named after the village on Skye
- Valtos (Black Clover), a character in the manga series Black Clover
- Valtos (band), an "electro-trad" duo composed of Skye-based musicians Martyn MacDonald and Daniel Docherty.
