= Valtos (band) =

Scottish music duo

- Origin: Isle of Skye, Scotland
- Genres: Celtic fusion, house music, Gaelic music
- Years active: 2021–present
- Label: Island Life (2022−present)
- Members: Daniel Docherty; Martyn MacDonald
- Website: www.valtosband.co.uk

Valtos is an electronic Celtic fusion duo based on the Isle of Skye. Their name comes from the village of the same name, close to Staffin on Skye.

== History ==
=== 2021: Formation ===
Valtos was formed in 2021 by Martyn MacDonald and Daniel Docherty, both natives of Skye. They performed their first show together in December 2021. Both members possess backgrounds in electronic music, with experience in DJing and music production.

=== 2022: Valtos ===
Prior to their debut album, Valtos attracted listeners through "sensational" live shows in Glasgow and by remixing well-known artists' songs. In January 2022, they released their debut single, a remix of "Marx Terrace" by fellow Skye band Peatbog Faeries. They followed this in February with "Home", featuring vocals in English and Scottish Gaelic from Eilidh Cormack and Lana Pheutan of Sian. In April they released "Ceòl Dannsa", incorporating a vocal sample from Donnie Munro of Runrig, and in June, they remixed "Ceitidh's" by Glaswegian trad group Project Smok, before releasing their self-titled debut album on Bandcamp.

Valtos featured collaborations with Donnie Munro, Gary Innes of Mànran, acclaimed fiddle player Euan McLaughlin, Allan MacDonald of Niteworks, and Eilidh Cormack and Lana Pheutan. The album achieved over 100,000 streams in its first few weeks. Its title tracks makes reference to the flight of Charles Edward Stuart after Culloden, the Strip the Willow, and natural features of Skye including the mountains and sea. Valtos was well-received by critics in the Scottish trad scene, particularly for its success at mixing house beats with traditional sounds.

Following their debut album, Valtos continued to collaborate with other artists. In August, they remixed "Flashback" by Manx trad group Mec Lir, before collaborating with Scottish bands Talisk and Elephant Sessions to release a charity EP for Movember.

In December 2022, Valtos received the award for 'Up and Coming Artist of the Year' at the Scots Trad Music Awards.

=== 2023–2024: Touring & Singles ===
Following their win at the Scots Trad Music Awards, Valtos spent most of 2023 touring and releasing new singles in collaboration with other Scottish artists.

In January 2023, they performed a sold-out show alongside Project Smok at Glasgow's Celtic Connections. In February they released "Liberate" with Project Smok; in March, "Lose Control" with Siiga; in April, "Faili" with Eilidh Cormack and Ruairidh Gray; in June, "Lost in Translation" with Lana Pheutan and Man of the Minch; in November, "Spearhead" with Gnoss; and in December, "1990" with Elephant Sessions.

In January 2024, Valtos reappeared at Celtic Connections, joined by several of their longtime collaborators. In April, the duo released "A' Chuthag" (The Cuckoo), featuring vocals from acclaimed Gaelic folksinger Julie Fowlis, ahead of their appearance as the opening act at Edinburgh Tradfest. In 2026 they collaborated with Glasgow indie band Lucia and the Best Boys to make "The Night" which is featured on The Last Light.

== Influences ==
Valtos have cited pioneers of the Celtic fusion sound, Martyn Bennett and the Peatbog Faeries as major influences on their sound, as well as electronic musicians outside of Scotland including Madeon, Odesza, and Bicep. They describe their genre of music as "electro-trad".

Differentiating themselves from earlier bands, the duo said: "Where Niteworks and the Peatbog Faeries take traditional music and add electronic elements, we describe our music as turning that on its head, taking electronic music and adding traditional elements."

Valtos' artistry strongly derives from the natural beauty of their home, and the rich history of the Gaelic language and culture. Regarding the latter, they have received commendation for the political messages contained within their work. Their 2023 single "Liberate" features vocal samples from former Liberal Democrat leader and advocate for the Scottish Highlands, Charles Kennedy. Meanwhile, their 2022 single, "Beinn", references the old Gaelic proverb "Siud mar a tha, ’s mar a bha, ’s mar a bhios" (that's how it is, was, and will be), before inverting it to "Siud mar a tha, ’s mar a bha, ach seo mar a bhios" (that's how it is and was, but this is how it will be), thus reclaiming use of the Gaelic language in defiance of its historic repression.

== Discography ==
Studio albums

- Valtos (2022)
- Valtos & Friends (2024)
- The Last Light (2026)
