= Ashaig =

Coordinates: 57.247°N 5.829°W

Ashaig: Scottish Gaelic: Aiseag
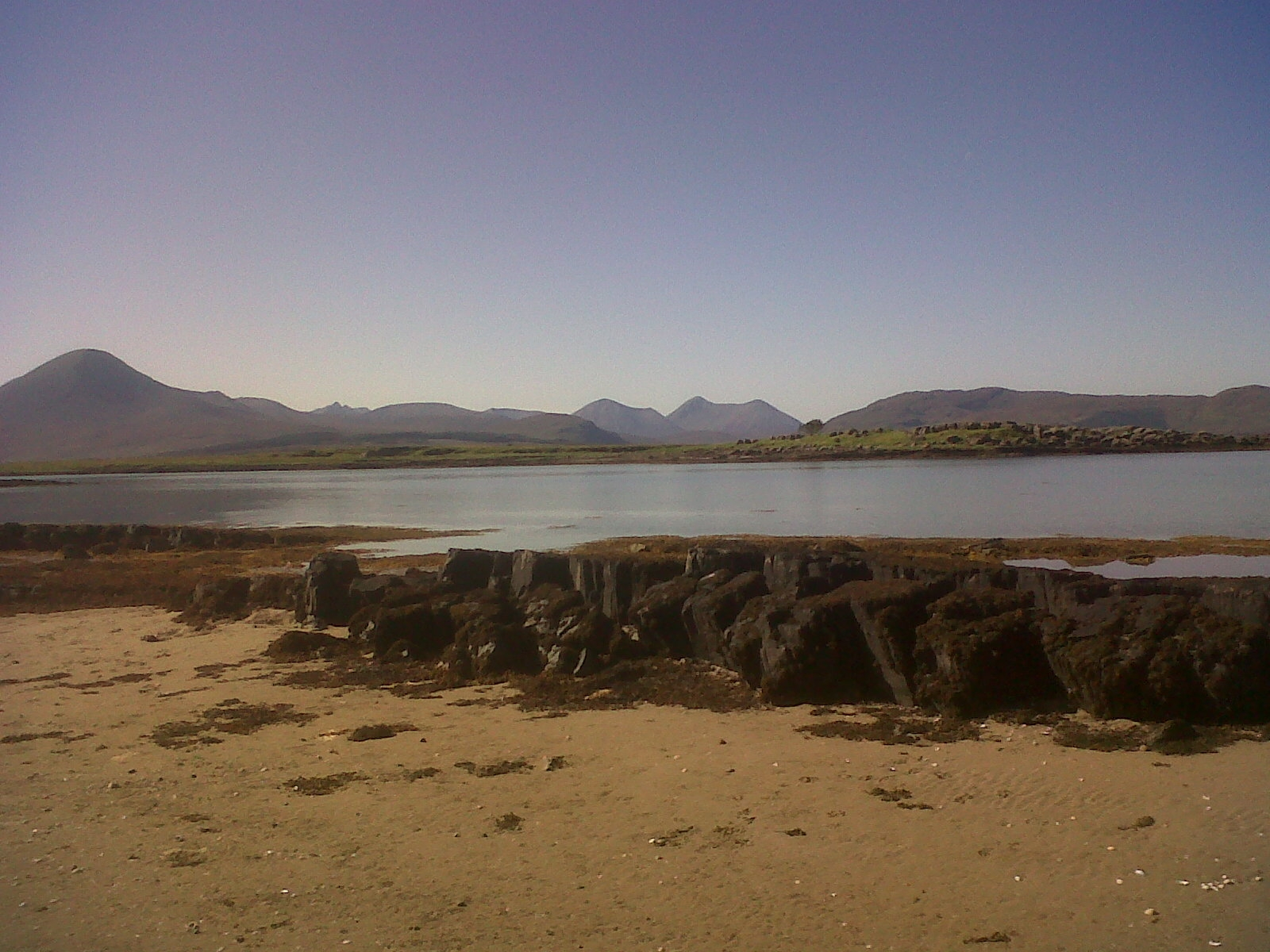
- View from the beach at Ashaig towards Beinn na Caillich

- Location within the Isle of Skye
- OS grid reference: NG690238
- Council area: Highland
- Lieutenancy area: Ross and Cromarty
- Country: Scotland
- Sovereign state: United Kingdom
- Post town: ISLE OF SKYE
- Postcode district: IV49
- Dialling code: 01471
- Police: Scotland
- Fire: Scottish
- Ambulance: Scottish
- UK Parliament: Inverness, Skye and West Ross-shire
- Scottish Parliament: Skye, Lochaber and Badenoch

Ashaig (Scottish Gaelic: Aiseag, referring to a ferry) is a small township, situated adjacent to Upper Breakish and Lower Breakish near Broadford on the island of Skye, Scotland. For administrative purposes, it lies in the Highland Council area.

== History ==
=== Connection with St Maelrubha ===
The old burial ground at Ashaig, which is still in use, reflects the site's ancient religious associations. By tradition, it is closely connected with St. Maelrubha (c.642-722), the apostle to Skye, who is said variously to have sailed over from Applecross (on a large flat stone) and to have occupied the small island of Pabay opposite the beach. Also in the burial ground are several Commonwealth War Graves, the majority of these being Royal Navy casualties from the warship HMS Curacoa which sank in 1942 following a collision with the ocean liner Queen Mary, which it was escorting at the time. There are still to be seen the sacred spring that started when the saint tore a small tree from the ground and a rocky crag above the river, which he is said to have used as a pulpit (Creag an leabhair, "the rock of the book"). The saint's bell, which is supposed to have hung from a tree and to have pealed of its own accord in order to summon the faithful, is no longer in evidence.

=== Archaeological remains ===
The spring is covered by a stone-built well-house. Conservation work in 1994 revealed that it was fed by a channel from an earlier stone-lined spring. One of the lintels of the linking channel bore a lozenge 75 millimetres (3 inches) long, and a cross-marked stone was found near the well-house. A Neolithic axe was also found near the holy well.

Within the burial ground, the remains of a mediaeval church ("Cill Ashik") were still in existence as late as the middle of the 19th century.

== Transport ==
Ashaig is situated on the A87 road.

=== Airfield ===
Ashaig is the site of Broadford Airfield which was built in 1972. It is no longer used for commercial flights, as these came to an end in 1988. It is currently used by a flying club and emergency services. There is a large and attractive sandy beach at the end of the airstrip, except at high tide.

The airfield was featured in the 1980 movie Flash Gordon.
