= Broadford Airfield =

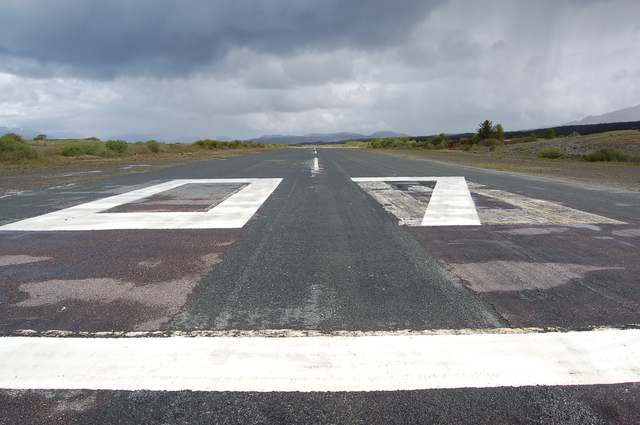
- Runway at Broadford Airfield
- IATA: SKL; ICAO: EGEI

Summary
- Airport type: Public
- Owner/Operator: Highland Council
- Location: Ashaig, Broadford, Isle of Skye
- Elevation AMSL: 24 ft / 7 m
- Coordinates: 57°15′13″N 05°49′27″W

Map
- Location on Skye

Runways
| Direction | Length | | Surface |
| Direction | m | ft | Surface |
|---|---|---|---|
| 07/25 | 793 | 2,602 | Asphalt |

Isle of Skye (Broadford) Airfield (also known as Ashaig Airstrip or Broadford Aerodrome) is a small airfield on the Isle of Skye, Scotland, with a single runway. It is next to the hamlet of Ashaig, near the village of Broadford.

== History ==
The airport was constructed by the Corps of Royal Engineers and opened in 1972 to serve as a gateway to the Isle of Skye. Loganair operated a scheduled service from the airfield to Glasgow from 1972. However, this service was discontinued in 1988.

No commercial services have existed since then, and the airfield is usually deserted. The airport is occasionally used by NHS Highland and the Scottish Ambulance Service for transferring patients to hospitals in Inverness or Glasgow.

In 1980 the airport was used as a filming location for the opening scene of Flash Gordon.

In recent years the airfield has been used for storage of large wind turbine components. It is also used for land sailing activities.

== Music festival ==
Between 2005 and 2007 the airfield hosted the Isle of Skye Music Festival.

In March 2012, it hosted the Celtic Connections Big Top, part of Glasgow's Celtic Connections festival. Artists performing at this two-day event included Rosanne Cash, The Civil Wars, Raul Malo, Mànran and Niteworks. This was the first time Celtic Connections has held an event outside Glasgow.
