= Isle of Skye Music Festival =

Music festival in Scotland

- Genre: rock, pop, dance
- Dates: May or June
- Locations: Ashaig Airstrip near Broadford on the Isle of Skye, Scotland
- Years active: 2005 - 2007

The Isle of Skye Music Festival was an annual music festival that took place on the Ashaig Airstrip near Broadford on the Isle of Skye in Scotland.

== Overview ==
It was one of the earliest festivals in the year, occurring in late May or June, a time known on the Island to be the driest in the year. From this location there are views of the coast and Cuillin hills; organisers describe it as "the most impressive backdrop of any UK festival".

The festival won the "Most Fan-Friendly Festival" award at the 2006 UK Festival Awards. The Festival offered on-site parking, a dedicated bus service and camping facilities.

The festival includes a mix of Scottish and international artists. It also seeks to promote the island's cultural identity by featuring lesser known local bands and by selling traditional food such as porridge and local wild boar burgers.

In 2007 the festival was included as part of the Highland 2007 culture festival, bands performing included Primal Scream, Kasabian and Mylo.

The 2008 festival was cancelled after the organisers ran up over £500,000 of debts, and it was reported some musicians and suppliers had not yet been paid for work at the previous festival. The shortfall was due to much lower than expected crowds at the previous event, after spending large amounts of money on bands.

In 2015 a new two-day event called Skye Live Festival succeeded, taking place in Portree on the Isle of Skye.

== 2007 Line up ==
The festival took place on 25 and 26 May 2007.

=== Main stage ===
Friday	Saturday
Kasabian; Ash; Mylo; Echo And The Bunnymen; El Presidente; Injuns	Primal Scream; Dirty Pretty Things; The Aliens; Union of Knives; We Are The Physics; Belisha; Stereoglo; The Low Miffs

=== Non stop stage ===
Friday
- Calvin Harris

Scaryman

- Buzzcocks
- Ali Tiefschwarz
- Yourcodenameis:Milo
- The Viviens
- Non Stop DJs -Ali Mcfly & Ali Maclennan
Saturday
- John Martyn
- Mark Olson
- Barry Peters
- Gecko 3
- Soma DJs to be announced

=== Shipping forecast stage ===
Friday	Saturday
Incredible Fling Band; Meantime; Fred Morisson & Friends; Breabach; Fiona Mackenzie and Brian O Headhra; The McCrimmon Sessions	Seth Lakeman; Skipinnish; Session A9; Breabach; Giveway; Arthur Cormack; Avernish; The McCrimmon Sessions

=== ITSON stage ===
Friday	Saturday
The Needles; Fortunate Sons; Uncle Rocket; Highland Youth; DJs to be announced	The Mitsubishis; Darkwater; Hookares; Highland Youth; Convo; DJs to be announced
