= Sian (band) =

Scottish traditional band

- Origin: Scotland
- Genres: Scottish Gaelic music
- Years active: 2016–present
- Members: Ellen MacDonald; Eilidh Cormack; Ceitlin Lilidh
- Website: https://www.sian-music.com/about

Sian is a Scottish all-female traditional band who are known for their Gaelic vocal harmonies and celebrating Gaelic songs composed by women. They formed to raise the prominence of work by female Gaelic bards, which might not have received much attention or credit otherwise.

Their name "Sian" takes its meaning from the Scottish Gaelic for "storm" or "the elements".

== History ==
Sian originally came together at the Fèisean nan Gàidheal Blas Festival, when they were put together with Innes White, a guitarist and musician, to perform and celebrate songs by female Scottish bards in 2016. They continue with this theme to this day in their choice of material.

In 2018, Sian featured on Niteworks' song "Air Fàir an Là" on their album of the same name. The song "Air Fàir an Là" is originally the work of 17th century poet, Màiri nighean Alasdair Ruaidh, born in Harris but who spent much of her life in the Isle of Skye, who in her lifetime was shunned for her sin of writing poetry and upon her death, buried face down as punishment. This track marked the beginning of a long-term collaboration between the two bands which continued until Niteworks disbanded in November 2024.

In March 2020, Sian released their debut album, Sian. Their second album araon, meaning 'as one' or 'in harmony', was released in August 2025.

== Band members ==
Sian has three Scottish band members:

- Ellen MacDonald - also a member of Dàimh and a graduate of Sabhal Mòr Ostaig, Isle of Skye, where she studied traditional music. MacDonald also performs alongside Niteworks and provides the voices of Gaelic cartoon characters for example, she voiced Alvin from Alvin and the Chipmunks for CBBC Alba's Gaelic children's section.
- Eilidh Cormack - Gaelic Ambassador of the Year 2018, Singer of the Year at MG ALBA Scots Trad Music Awards 2018, Semi-finalist in BBC Scotland's Young Traditional Musician of the Year in 2016, won Ladies' Gold Medallist at the Royal National Mòd in 2014 and contributed vocals to The Bard's Tale IV, a video game.
- Ceitlin Lilidh - also has a solo career in Gaelic songs and is a graduate of the Royal Conservatoire of Scotland. She has won the Traditional Gold Medal at the Royal National Mòd and the Danny Kyle Award; and was nominated for Gaelic Singer of the Year 2019. Her vocal also feature in Outlaw King on Netflix and Skipinnish's album, The Seventh Wave.

== Discography ==
=== Albums ===
- Sian (2020)
- araon (2025)
