= Niteworks =

Electronic Celtic fusion band

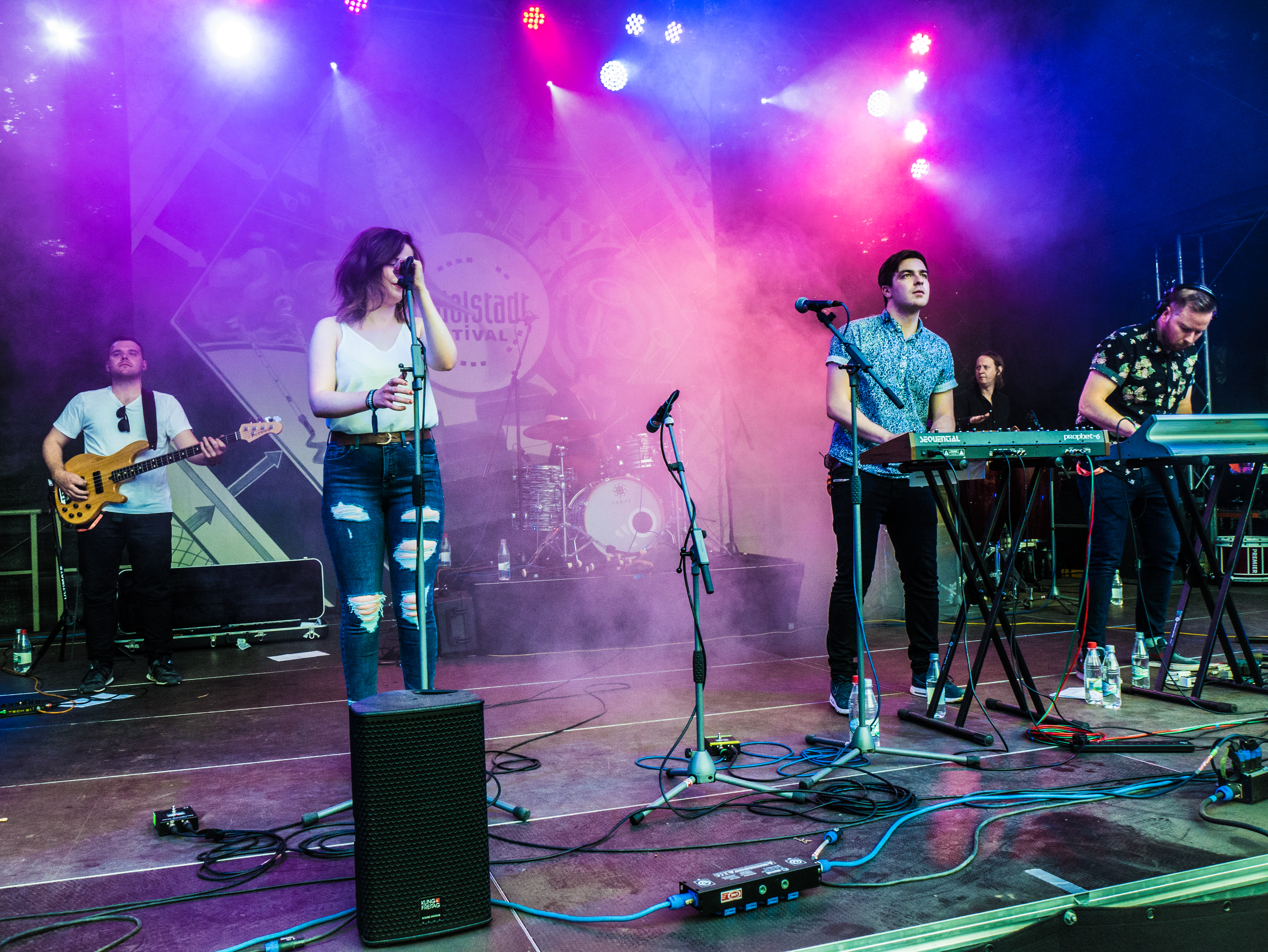

Background information
- Also known as: Obair Oidhche
- Origin: Isle of Skye, Scotland
- Genres: Electronica; house; Celtic fusion
- Years active: 2007–2024
- Members: Innes Strachan; Allan MacDonald; Christopher Nicolson; Ruairidh Graham
- Website: niteworksband.com

Niteworks (also known by the Scottish Gaelic Obair Oidhche) was an Electronic Celtic fusion band from the Isle of Skye. The band are known for writing new songs in Gaelic and melding the bagpipes and Gaelic song forms such as puirt à beul with techno and house beats.

== History ==
Niteworks came together in early 2008. Shortly after forming, the band won several awards including the Rapal song contest with "Nam Aonar san Fonn". Niteworks' name comes from a sample of an old Gaelic speaker referring to "obair oidhche" or "night work".

Niteworks have covered Runrig's "Chì mi 'n Geamhradh", and write songs in both Gaelic and English.

The band has toured across the Scottish music festival circuit, playing at Rockness, Knockengorroch as well as frequent returns to Tartan Heart Festival. They have also headlined Hebridean Celtic Festival's Islands Stage in 2011 (described as the "band of the night"), 2012 and 2015 and sold out Glasgow's Oran Mor in 2012 and 2015, as part of the city's popular Celtic Connections Festival. They also DJ frequently, independently of their live act.

Their debut EP, Niteworks: Obair Oidhche, was released on 15 October 2011. This was acclaimed and attracted a larger fanbase to the group.

Niteworks launched their debut album, NW, in October 2015 with a sold-out gig at Glasgow's SWG3 Warehouse. The album draws further on the band's Skye roots and Gaelic upbringing and drew comparisons to the legendary Martyn Bennett.

The band capped off 2015 by opening the show at the Scottish Trad Music Awards at Dundee's Caird Hall.

In August 2018, Niteworks released their second album Air Fàir an Là which was co-produced with Alex Smoke and included collaborations with other traditional musicians including SIAN, Iain Morrison, Ellen MacDonald (of Sian and Dàimh), Julie Fowlis and Kinnaris Quintet.

In January 2022, Niteworks released their third album A'Ghrian which was shortlisted for the Scottish Album of the Year Award.

In November 2023 they announced that they would disband the following year. A final single covering Runrig's An Toll Dubh was released in May 2024 ahead of November's Solas Na Maidne ("Morning Light") tour, which played dates in Inverness, Edinburgh, London and Aberdeen before concluding at the Glasgow O2 Academy on November 16th.

== Band members ==
Names also given in Scottish Gaelic:

- Innes Strachan, Aonghas Strachan (vocals/keyboards)
- Allan MacDonald, Ailean Domhnallach (guitar/bagpipes/keyboards)
- Christopher Nicolson, Crisdean MacNeacail (bass guitar)
- Ruairidh Graham, Ruairidh Greumach (drums)

== Discography ==
=== Albums ===
- NW (2015)
- Air Fàir an Là (2018)
- A' Ghrian (2022)
- Solas Na Maidne Live (2025)

=== EPs ===
- Niteworks : Obair Oidhche (2011)
- NW: Edinburgh Mixes (2017)
- An t-Eilean Mixes (2020)

=== Singles ===
- Edinburgh's Hogmanay 2018 Fireworks Soundtrack (2019)
