= Isle of Skye =

Island of the Inner Hebrides, Scotland

An t-Eilean Sgitheanach (Gaelic)

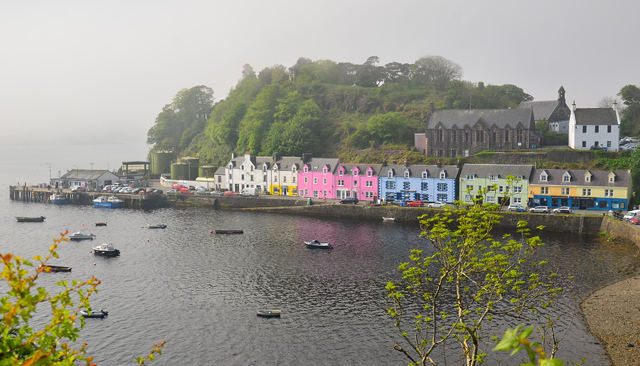
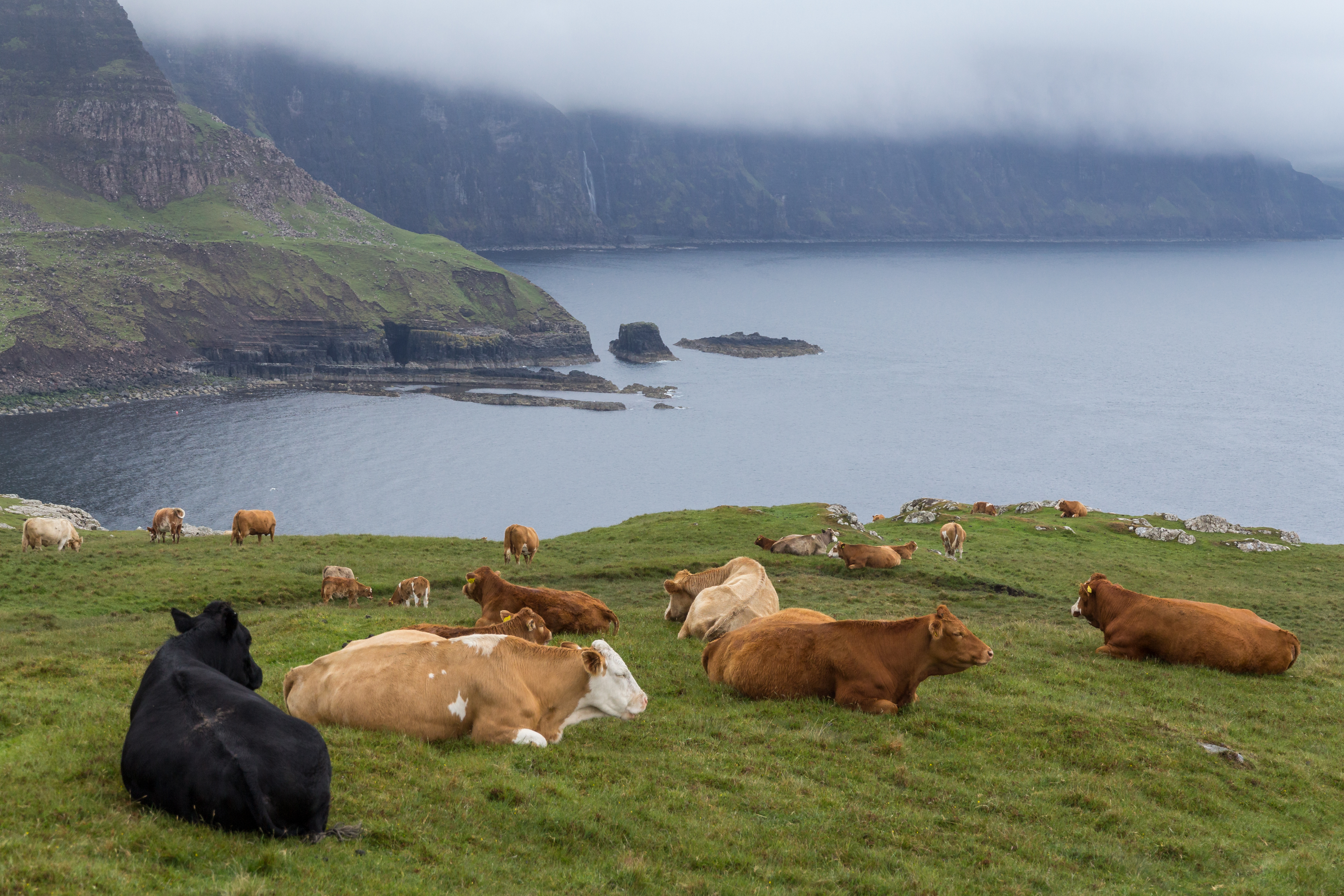
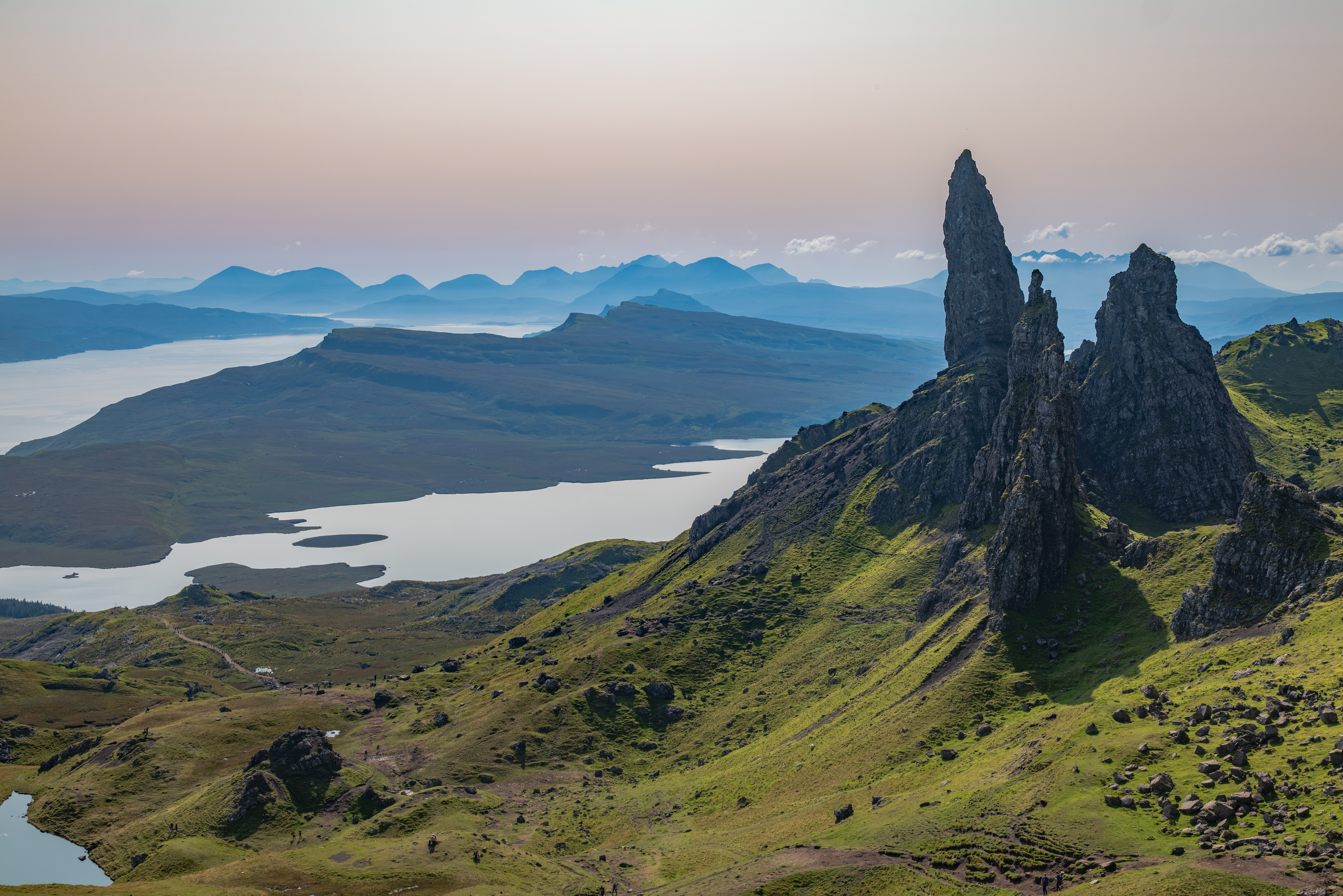
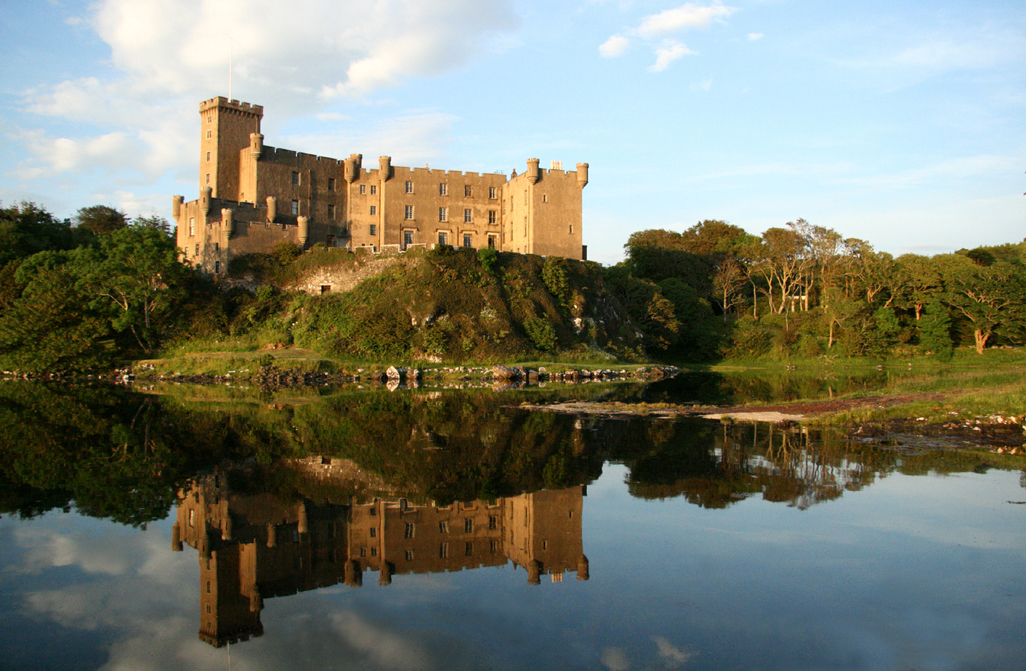
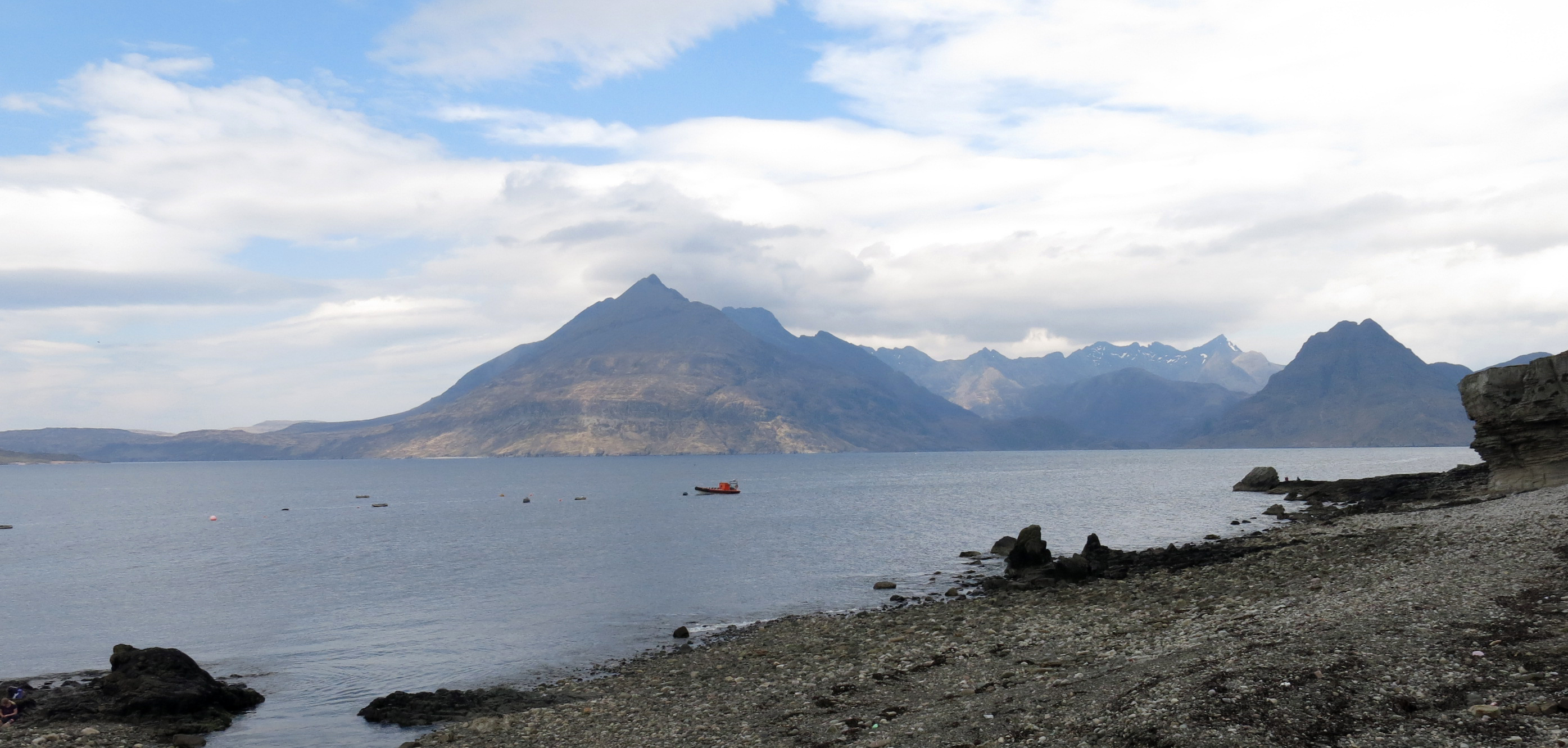
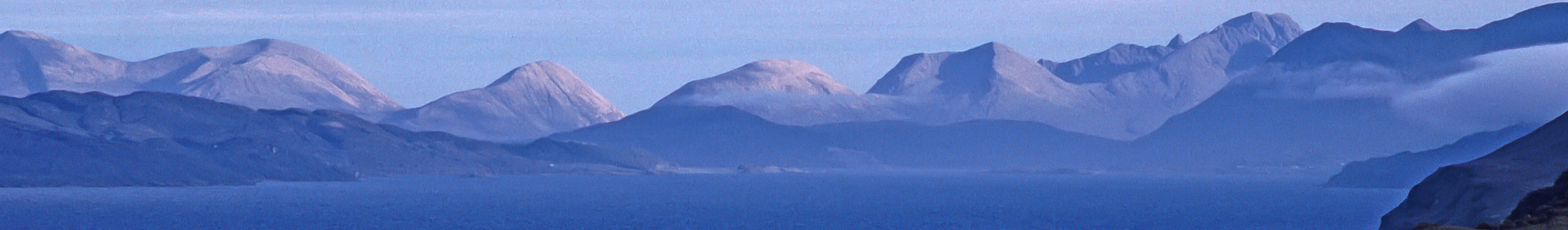
- Portree waterfront Neist Point Old Man of Storr Dunvegan Castle The Cuillin The southern mountains of Skye from Trotternish

Location
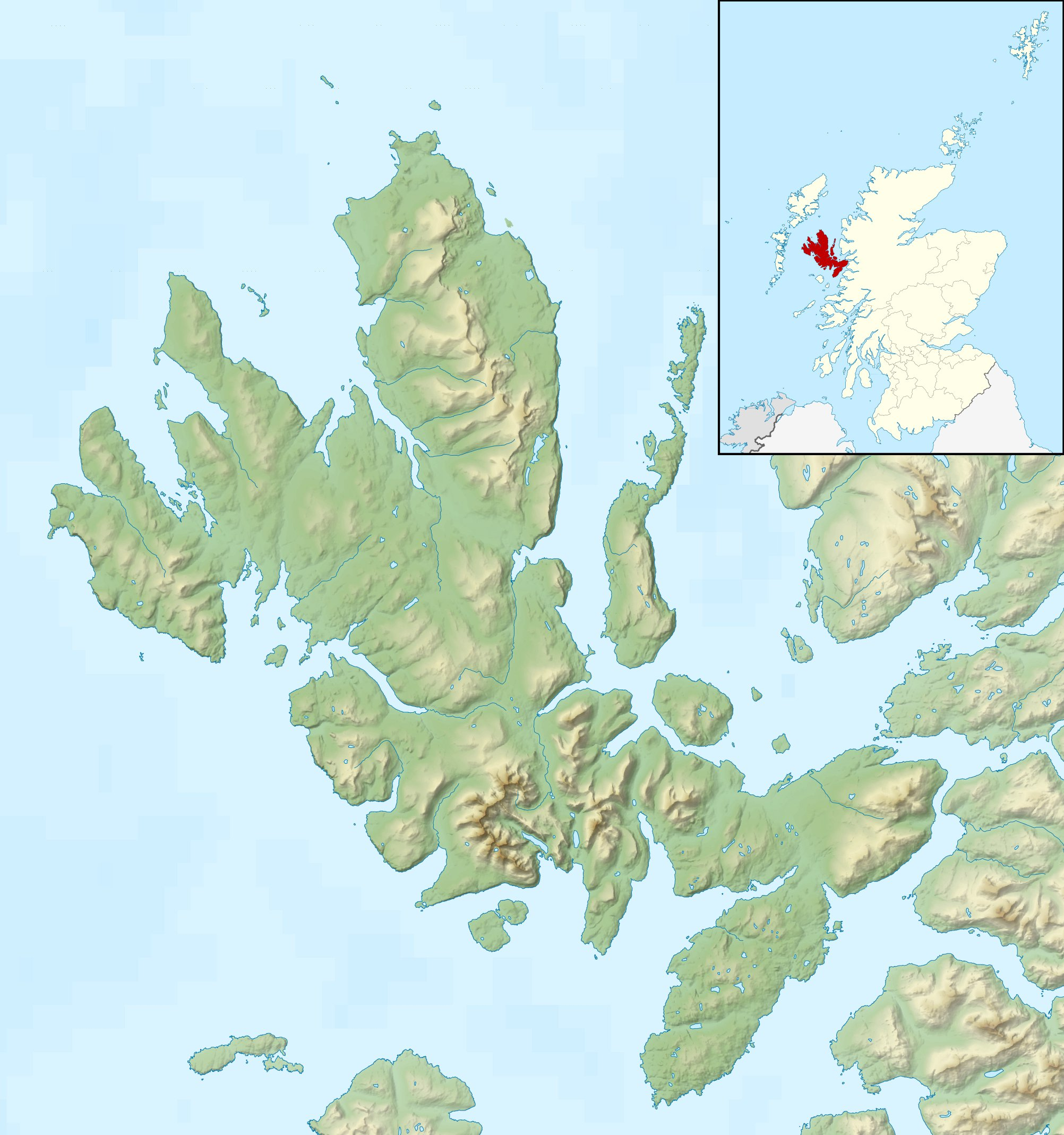
- Map of Skye & surrounding islands Skye within the Highlands Skye within Scotland
- OS grid reference: NG452319
- Coordinates: 57.30°N 6.35°W

Name
- Gaelic pronunciation: [əɲ ˈtʲʰelan ˈs̪kʲi.anəx]
- Name meaning: Etymology unclear
- Old Norse name: Skíð

Physical geography
- Island group: Skye
- Area: 1,656 km^{2} (639 sq mi)
- Area rank: 2
- Highest elevation: Sgùrr Alasdair, 993 m (3,258 ft)

Administration
- Council area: Highland
- Country: Scotland
- Sovereign state: United Kingdom

Demographics
- Population: 10,496
- Population rank: 4
- Population density: 6.34/km^{2} (16.4/sq mi)
- Largest settlement: Portree

The Isle of Skye, (Note: Scottish Gaelic: An t-Eilean Sgitheanach [əɲ ˈtʲʰelan ˈs̪kʲi.anəx]; Eilean a' Cheò) or simply Skye, (Note: /skaɪ/; Old Norse: Skíð) is the largest and northernmost of the major islands in the Inner Hebrides of Scotland. (Note: The largest of the Inner Hebrides that lie north of Skye are the Isle of Ewe, Tanera Mòr, and Handa, none of which exceeds 310 hectares (770 acres) in size. See also List of Inner Hebrides.) The island's peninsulas radiate from a mountainous hub dominated by the Cuillin, the rocky slopes of which provide some of the most dramatic mountain scenery in the country. Although Sgitheanach has been suggested to describe a winged shape, no definitive agreement exists as to the name's origin.

The island has been occupied since the late Upper Palaeolithic period, and over its history has been occupied at various times by Celtic tribes including the Picts and the Gaels, Scandinavian Vikings, and most notably the powerful integrated Norse-Gaels clans of MacLeod and MacDonald. The island was considered to be under Norwegian suzerainty until the 1266 Treaty of Perth, which transferred control over to Scotland.

The 18th-century Jacobite risings led to the breaking-up of the clan system and later clearances that replaced entire communities with sheep farms, some of which involved forced emigrations to distant lands. Resident numbers declined from over 20,000 in the early 19th century to just under 9,000 by the closing decade of the 20th century. Skye's population increased by 4% between 1991 and 2001. About a third of the residents were Gaelic speakers in 2001, and although their numbers are in decline, this aspect of island culture remains important. The main industries are tourism, agriculture, fishing, and forestry. Skye is part of the Highland Council local government area and wholly within the historic county of Inverness-shire. The island's largest settlement is Portree, which is also its capital, known for its picturesque harbour. Links to various nearby islands by ferry are available, and since 1995, to the mainland by the Skye Bridge. The climate is mild, wet, and windy. The abundant wildlife includes the golden eagle, red deer, and Atlantic salmon. The local flora is dominated by heather moor, and nationally important invertebrate populations live on the surrounding sea bed. Skye has provided the locations for various novels and feature films and is celebrated in poetry and song.

== Etymology ==
In the second century AD, Ptolemy mentioned an island named Scetis, not among the Aibudai Islands north of Hivernia (Ireland), as he called the Hebrides, but near the Orcades (Orkney Islands); therefore, Scetis rather seems to be Shetland. Ravenna Cosmography, written in the 7th century, refers to Scitis, probably following Ptolemy. Nevertheless, some scholars believe, it was the first mention of Skye by its actual name. One possible derivation comes from skitis, an early Celtic word for "winged", which may describe how the island's peninsulas radiate out from a mountainous centre. Subsequent Gaelic-, Norse- and English-speaking peoples have influenced the history of Skye; the relationships between their names for the island are not straightforward. Various etymologies have been proposed, such as the "winged isle" or "the notched isle", but no definitive solution has been found to date; the place name may be from an earlier, non-Gaelic language.

In the Norse sagas, Skye is called Skíð, for example in the Hákonar saga Hákonarsonar and a skaldic poem in the Heimskringla from around 1230 contains a line that translates as "the hunger battle-birds were filled in Skye with the blood of foemen killed". The island was also referred to by the Norse as Skuy (misty isle), Skýey or Skuyö (isle of cloud). The traditional Gaelic name is An t-Eilean Sgitheanach (the island of Skye), An t-Eilean Sgiathanach being a more recent and less common spelling. In 1549, Donald Munro, High Dean of the Isles, wrote of "Sky": "This Ile is callit Ellan Skiannach in Irish, that is to say in Inglish the wyngit Ile, be reason it has mony wyngis and pointis lyand furth fra it, throw the dividing of thir foirsaid Lochis." (Note: English translation from Lowland Scots: "This isle is called Ellan Skiannach in Gaelic, that is to say in English, The Winged Isle, because of its many wings and points that come from it, through dividing of the land by the aforesaid lochs.") The meaning of this Gaelic name is unclear.

Eilean a' Cheò, which means "island of the mist" (a translation of the Norse name), is a poetic Gaelic name for the island. (Note: In April 2007 it was reported in the media that the island's official name had been changed by the Highland Council to Eilean a' Cheò. However, the Council clarified that this name referred only to one of its 22 wards in the forthcoming election and that no plans were made to change signage or discontinue the English-language name.)

== Geography ==
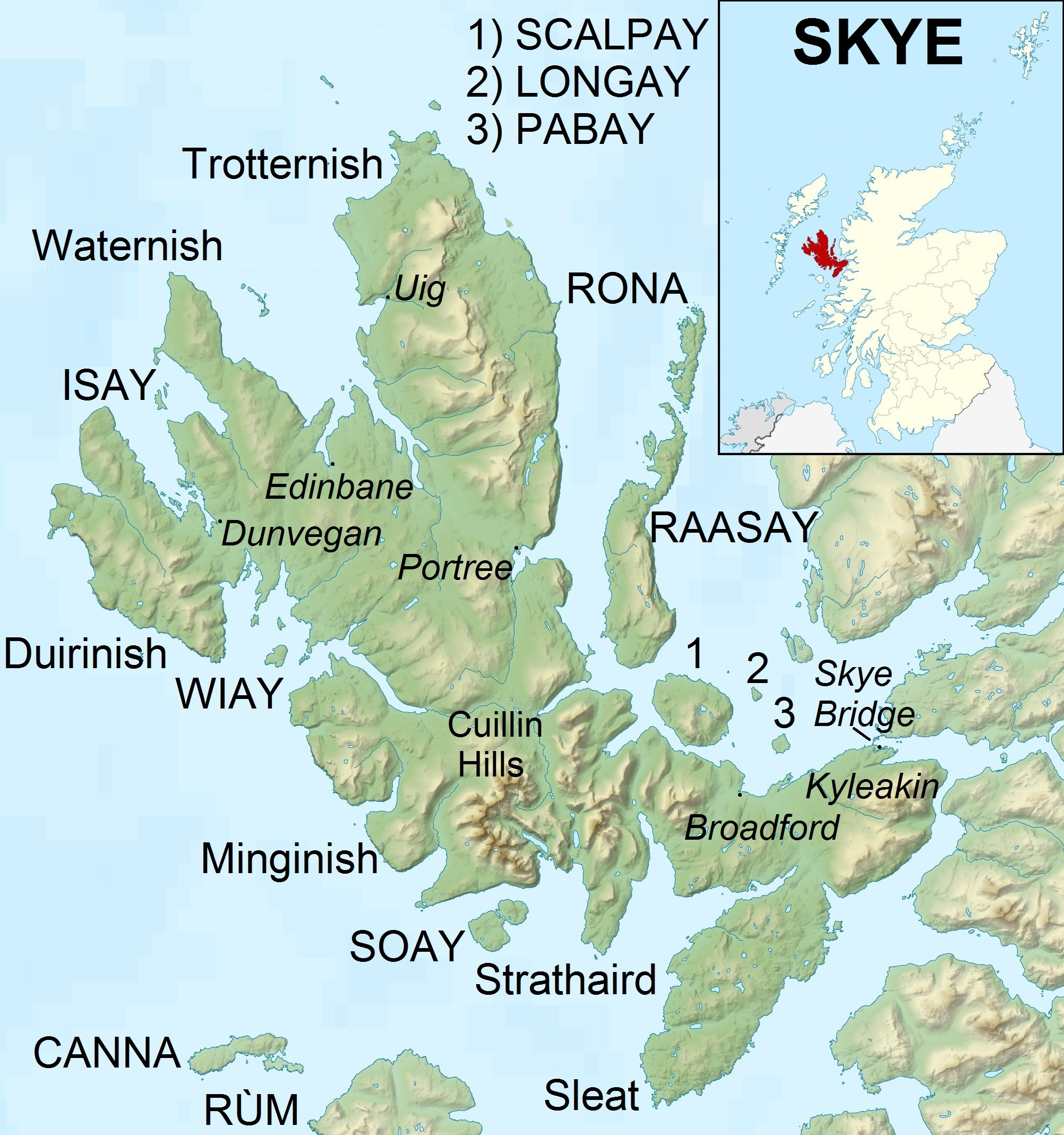
Skye and the surrounding islands

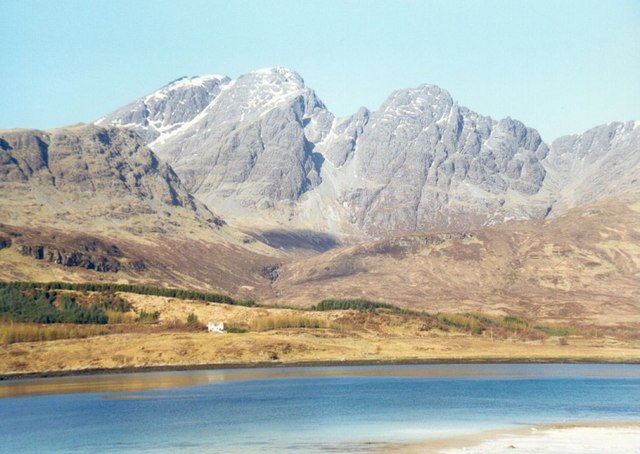
Bla Bheinn from Loch Slapin

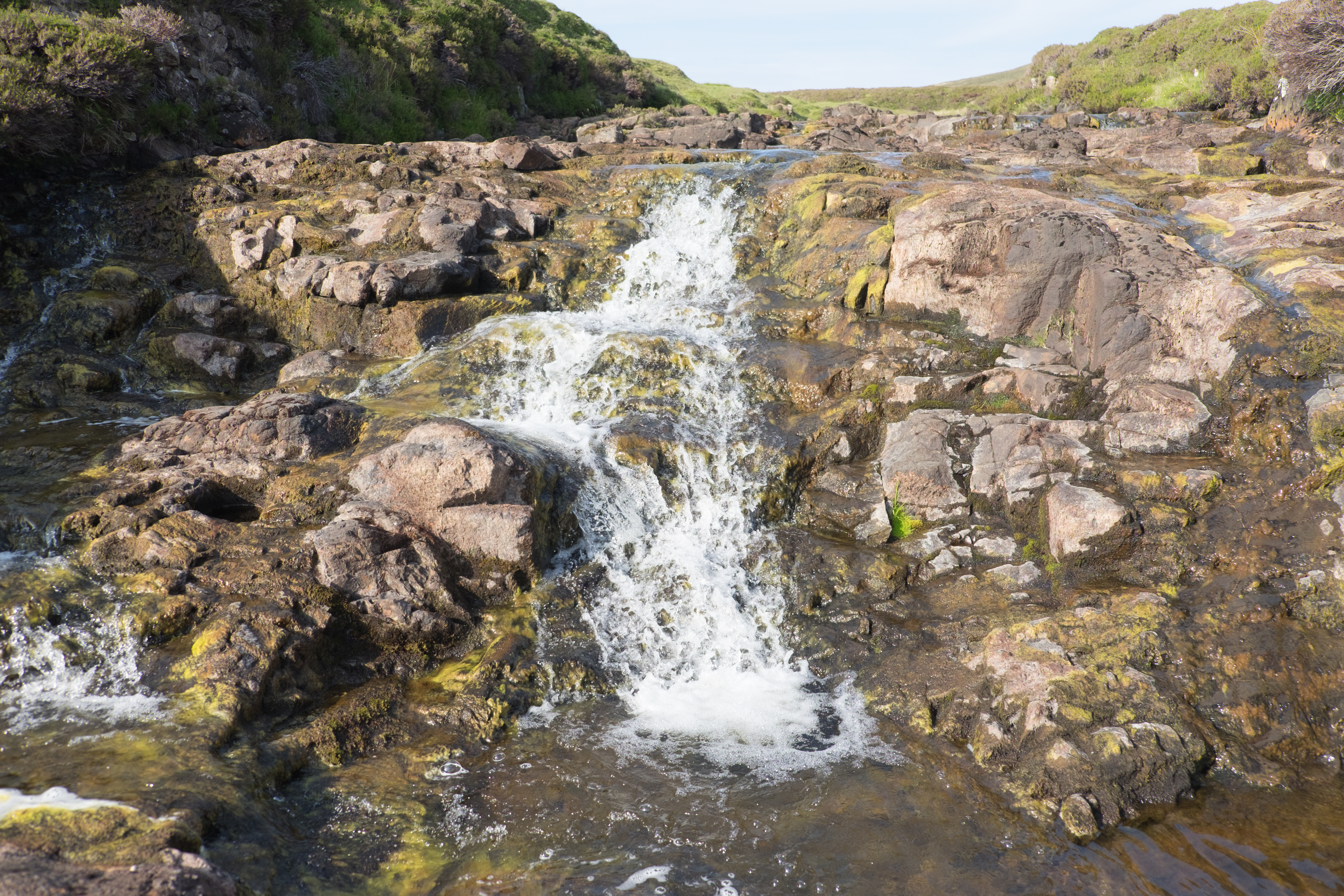
Waterfall on the River Rha between Staffin and Uig

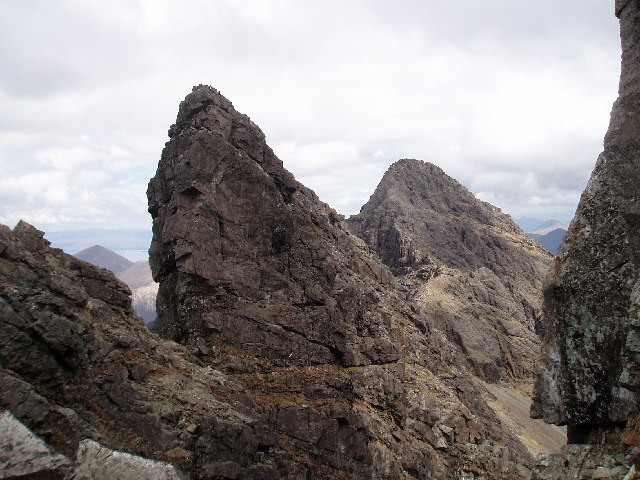
The vertical west face of the Basteir Tooth (a top next to Am Basteir) in the Cuillin, with Sgùrr nan Gillean in the background

At 1,656 km^{2} (639 sq mi), Skye is the second-largest island in Scotland after Lewis and Harris. The coastline of Skye is a series of peninsulas and bays radiating out from a centre dominated by the Cuillin hills (Gaelic: An Cuiltheann). Malcolm Slesser suggested that its shape "sticks out of the west coast of northern Scotland like a lobster's claw ready to snap at the fishbone of Harris and Lewis" and W. H. Murray, commenting on its irregular coastline, stated, "Skye is 60 miles [100 km] long, but what might be its breadth is beyond the ingenuity of man to state". (Note: Skye's irregular shape is created by the 15 major sea lochs that penetrate so far into the mountainous core that no part of the island is more than 8 kilometres (5.0 mi) from the sea.) Martin Martin, a native of the island, reported on it at length in a 1703 publication. His geological observations included a note that:

There are marcasites black and white, resembling silver ore, near the village Sartle: there are likewise in the same place several stones, which in bigness, shape, &c., resemble nutmegs, and many rivulets here afford variegated stones of all colours. The Applesglen near Loch-Fallart has agate growing in it of different sizes and colours; some are green on the outside, some are of a pale sky colour, and they all strike fire as well as flint: I have one of them by me, which for shape and bigness is proper for a sword handle. Stones of a purple colour flow down the rivulets here after great rains.

— Martin Martin, A Description of The Western Islands of Scotland.

The Black Cuillin, which are mainly composed of basalt and gabbro, include 12 Munros and provide some of the most dramatic and challenging mountain terrain in Scotland. The ascent of Sgùrr a' Ghreadaidh is one of the longest rock climbs in Britain and the Inaccessible Pinnacle is the only peak in Scotland that requires technical climbing skills to reach the summit. Nearby Sgùrr Alasdair, meanwhile, is the tallest mountain on any Scottish island. These hills make demands of the hill walker that exceed any others found in Scotland and a full traverse of the Cuillin ridge may take 15–20 hours. The Red Hills (Gaelic: Am Binnean Dearg) to the east are also known as the Red Cuillin. They are mainly composed of granite that has weathered into more rounded hills with many long scree slopes on their flanks. The highest point of these hills is Glamaig, one of only two Corbetts on Skye.

The northern peninsula of Trotternish is underlain by basalt, which provides relatively rich soils and a variety of unusual rock features. The Kilt Rock is named after the columnar structure of the ~70-metre (230 ft) cliffs, said to resemble the pleats in a kilt. The Quiraing is a spectacular series of rock pinnacles on the eastern side of the main spine of the peninsula and further south is the rock pillar of the Old Man of Storr. The view of the Quiraing and the Old Man of Storr is one of the most iconic in all of Scotland and is frequently used on calendars and tourism guides and brochures.

Beyond Loch Snizort to the west of Trotternish is the Waternish peninsula, which ends in Ardmore Point's double rock arch. Duirinish peninsula is separated from Waternish by Loch Dunvegan, which contains the island of Isay. It is ringed by sea cliffs that reach 296 metres (971 feet) on the west at Waterstein Head and on the northwest at Biod an Athair where, a metre from the summit trig pillar, the cliffs drop 1,029 feet (314 metres) to the ocean. Oolitic loam provides good arable land in the main valley. Lochs Bracadale and Harport and the island of Wiay lie between Duirinish and Minginish, which includes the narrower defiles of Talisker and Glen Brittle and whose beaches are formed from black basaltic sands. Strathaird is a relatively small peninsula close to the Cuillin hills with only a few crofting communities, the island of Soay lies offshore. The bedrock of Sleat in the south is Torridonian sandstone, which produces poor soils and boggy ground, although its lower elevations and relatively sheltered eastern shores enable a lush growth of hedgerows and crops. The islands of Raasay, Rona, Scalpay and Pabay all lie to the north and east between Skye and the mainland.

=== Palaeontology ===
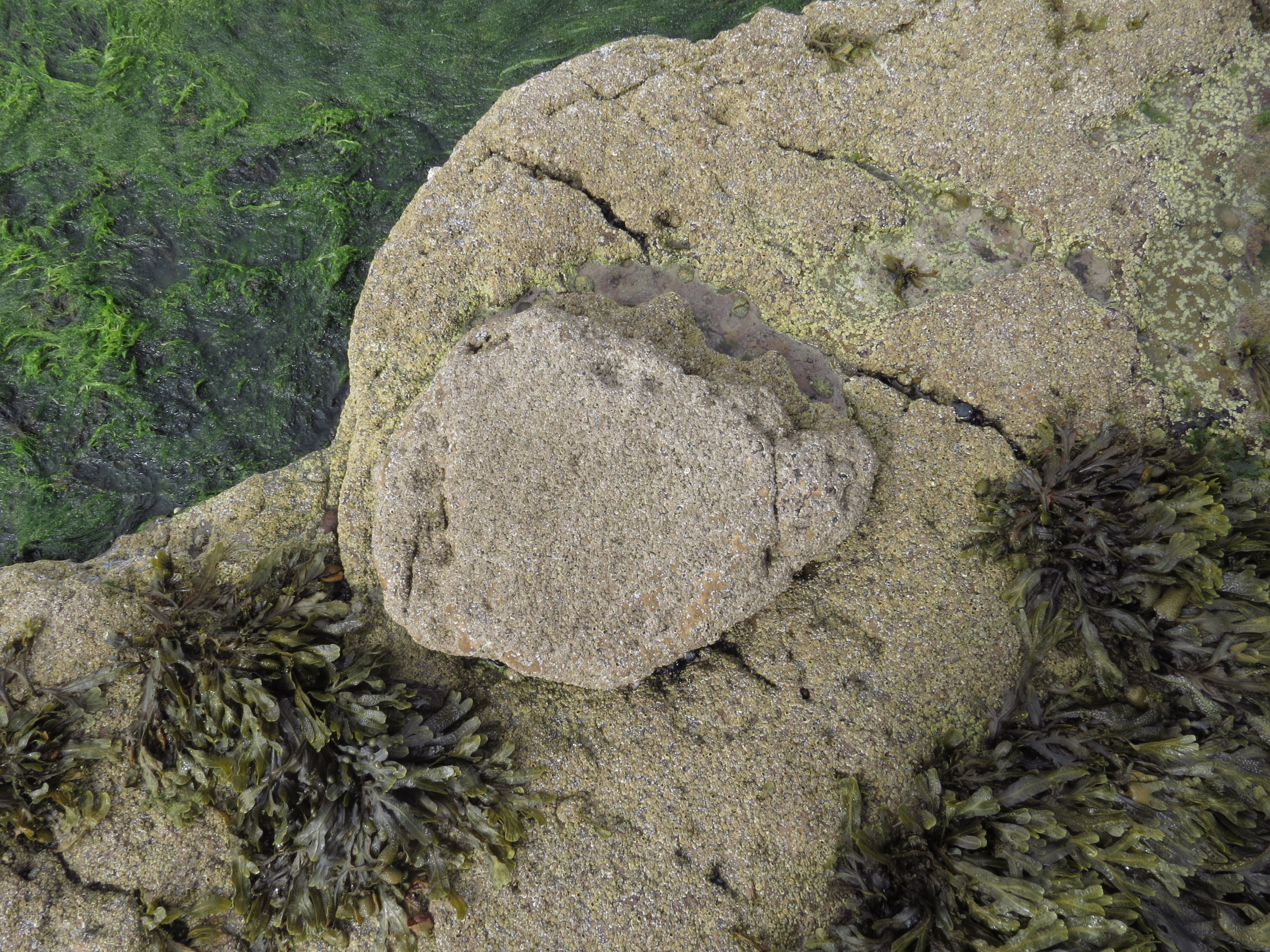
Sauropod footprint on wave cut platform at Duntulm

The Isle of Skye has a rich palaeontological record of Jurassic aged strata. The Trotternish peninsula in northeast Skye is renowned for its Middle Jurassic aged rock (circa 174-166 million years old), which has provided researchers with the opportunity to study dinosaur footprints and bones. The first scientifically described dinosaur footprint was discovered in 1982 and likely impressed by either a large theropod or ornithopod dinosaur. Later discoveries have included further footprints and bones. The first dinosaur bone (a tibia) was found in 1992 in Early Jurassic deposits in southern Skye and most likely belonged to a small Coelophysoid theropod. Subsequent Middle Jurassic aged bones found belonged to large theropods (a middle caudal vertebra and many teeth), sauropods (many vertebra, a couple of teeth, and a humerus), and thyreophorans (partial radius and ulna). Footprints for all these dinosaurs have been recorded in-situ across Trotternish at Brother's Point, An Corran (Staffin Bay), and Duntulm. Evidence of stegosaurs is noted in tracks from Brother's Point. A selection of Skye's palaeontological heritage is exhibited in the Staffin Museum in Ellishadder, Staffin. All dinosaur and vertebrate related fossils on Skye are protected by law by the Skye Nature Conservation Order 2019.

=== Towns and villages ===
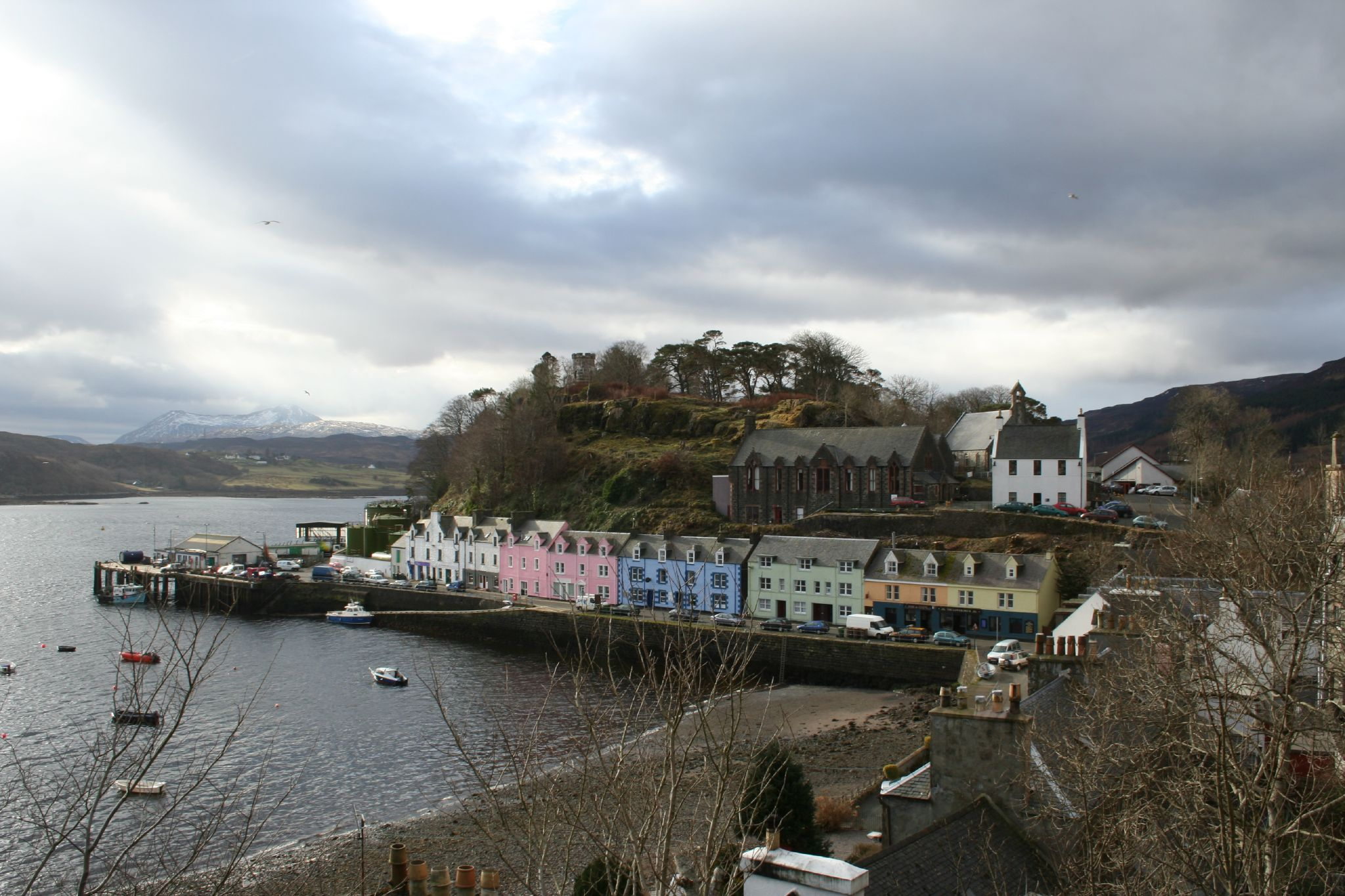
Portree, Skye's largest settlement

Portree in the north at the base of Trotternish is the largest settlement (estimated population 2,264 in 2011) and is the main service centre on the island. A December 2018 report recommended the village as "Skye's best home base" for visitors, since it has "a few hotels, hostels and bed-and-breakfasts in town, while more B&Bs line the roads into and out of town". The village also has "banks, churches, cafes and restaurants, a cinema at the Aros Centre, a swimming pool and library ... fuel filling stations and supermarkets".

Broadford, the location of the island's only airstrip, is on the east side of the island, and Dunvegan in the north-west is well known for its castle and the nearby Three Chimneys restaurant. The 18th-century Stein Inn on the Waternish coast is the oldest pub on Skye. Kyleakin is linked to Kyle of Lochalsh on the mainland by the Skye Bridge, which spans the narrows of Loch Alsh. Uig, the port for ferries to the Outer Hebrides, is on the west of the Trotternish peninsula, and Edinbane is between Dunvegan and Portree. Much of the rest of the population lives in crofting townships scattered around the coastline.

=== Climate ===
The influence of the Atlantic Ocean and the Gulf Stream create a mild oceanic climate. Temperatures are generally cool, averaging 6.5 °C (43.7 °F) in January and 15.4 °C (59.7 °F) in July at Duntulm in Trotternish. (Note: Figures provided for Staffin, only a few miles to the east, average 4.6 °C (40.3 °F) in January and 15.6 °C (60.1 °F) in July at noon.) Snow seldom lies at sea level and frosts are less frequent than on the mainland. Winds are a limiting factor for vegetation. South-westerlies are the most common and speeds of 128 km/h (80 mph) have been recorded. High winds are especially likely on the exposed coasts of Trotternish and Waternish. In common with most islands of the west coast of Scotland, rainfall is generally high at 1,500–2,000 mm (59–79 in) per annum and the elevated Cuillin are wetter still. Variations can be considerable, with the north tending to be drier than the south. Broadford, for example, averages more than 2,870 mm (113 in) of rain per annum. Trotternish typically has 200 hours of bright sunshine in May, the sunniest month. On 28 December 2015, the temperature reached 15 °C, beating the previous December record of 12.9 °C, set in 2013. On 9 May 2016, a temperature of 26.7 °C (80.1 °F) was recorded at Lusa in the southeast of the island.

Climate data for Duntulm, Skye
Month	Jan	Feb	Mar	Apr	May	Jun	Jul	Aug	Sep	Oct	Nov	Dec	Year
Record high °C (°F)	13.5 (56.3)	12.5 (54.5)	16.7 (62.1)	22.3 (72.1)	26.7 (80.1)	24.5 (76.1)	25.9 (78.6)	25.6 (78.1)	22.1 (71.8)	19.3 (66.7)	17.3 (63.1)	15.0 (59.0)	26.7 (80.1)
Mean daily maximum °C (°F)	6.5 (43.7)	6.6 (43.9)	8.1 (46.6)	9.6 (49.3)	12.4 (54.3)	14.3 (57.7)	15.4 (59.7)	15.7 (60.3)	14.2 (57.6)	11.5 (52.7)	9.1 (48.4)	7.6 (45.7)	10.9 (51.6)
Mean daily minimum °C (°F)	2.4 (36.3)	2.2 (36.0)	3.3 (37.9)	4.3 (39.7)	6.5 (43.7)	8.7 (47.7)	10.4 (50.7)	10.7 (51.3)	9.4 (48.9)	7.2 (45.0)	5.1 (41.2)	3.6 (38.5)	6.2 (43.2)
Record low °C (°F)	−4.0 (24.8)	−3.5 (25.7)	−4.1 (24.6)	−3.4 (25.9)	0.0 (32.0)	4.2 (39.6)	5.2 (41.4)	4.7 (40.5)	2.6 (36.7)	0.3 (32.5)	−4.5 (23.9)	−6.5 (20.3)	−6.5 (20.3)
Average precipitation mm (inches)	148 (5.84)	100 (3.93)	82 (3.24)	86 (3.40)	73 (2.87)	85 (3.35)	97 (3.83)	112 (4.41)	128 (5.05)	152 (6.00)	143 (5.63)	142 (5.58)	1,350 (53.13)
Source 1: Cooper (1983)
Source 2: Met office for May and December record high, bing weather

Climate data for Prabost, Skye (67 metres asl) 1991–2020
Month	Jan	Feb	Mar	Apr	May	Jun	Jul	Aug	Sep	Oct	Nov	Dec	Year
Mean daily maximum °C (°F)	6.6 (43.9)	7.1 (44.8)	8.5 (47.3)	11.2 (52.2)	14.1 (57.4)	15.7 (60.3)	16.9 (62.4)	17.1 (62.8)	15.1 (59.2)	11.9 (53.4)	8.9 (48.0)	7.0 (44.6)	11.7 (53.1)
Mean daily minimum °C (°F)	1.9 (35.4)	1.8 (35.2)	2.6 (36.7)	4.3 (39.7)	6.3 (43.3)	8.8 (47.8)	10.6 (51.1)	10.5 (50.9)	8.7 (47.7)	6.4 (43.5)	3.9 (39.0)	2.0 (35.6)	5.7 (42.3)
Average rainfall mm (inches)	208.5 (8.21)	168.3 (6.63)	141.7 (5.58)	94.7 (3.73)	90.1 (3.55)	82.2 (3.24)	102.4 (4.03)	124.9 (4.92)	150.5 (5.93)	198.6 (7.82)	204.6 (8.06)	202.7 (7.98)	1,769.1 (69.65)
Average rainy days	21.8	18.5	21.1	14.7	13.8	14.4	16.5	17.6	19.0	23.3	21.9	20.7	223.2
Mean monthly sunshine hours	33.4	64.3	105.5	151.0	195.8	151.4	134.0	121.2	102.3	70.1	40.6	30.7	1,200.3
Source: Met Office (rain days 1981–2010)

Climate data for Lusa, Skye (18 metres asl) 1991–2020
Month	Jan	Feb	Mar	Apr	May	Jun	Jul	Aug	Sep	Oct	Nov	Dec	Year
Mean daily maximum °C (°F)	7.4 (45.3)	7.8 (46.0)	9.2 (48.6)	11.6 (52.9)	14.1 (57.4)	15.9 (60.6)	17.3 (63.1)	17.3 (63.1)	15.6 (60.1)	12.6 (54.7)	9.7 (49.5)	7.5 (45.5)	12.2 (54.0)
Mean daily minimum °C (°F)	2.4 (36.3)	2.3 (36.1)	3.1 (37.6)	4.3 (39.7)	6.4 (43.5)	9.2 (48.6)	11.0 (51.8)	10.9 (51.6)	9.4 (48.9)	6.8 (44.2)	4.4 (39.9)	2.4 (36.3)	6.1 (43.0)
Average rainfall mm (inches)	240.8 (9.48)	185.1 (7.29)	172.6 (6.80)	114.0 (4.49)	111.3 (4.38)	95.8 (3.77)	114.0 (4.49)	137.4 (5.41)	180.0 (7.09)	217.7 (8.57)	209.9 (8.26)	240.9 (9.48)	2,019.5 (79.51)
Average rainy days (≥ 1 mm)	21.4	19.0	19.0	15.5	15.2	14.6	16.8	18.3	17.3	20.8	20.7	21.7	220.2
Source: Met Office

== History ==
=== Prehistory ===
The oldest evidence of human presence on Skye is late Upper Palaeolithic stone tools of Ahrensburgian-type found at South Cuidrach on the far north of Skye. No organic material was found in connection to the tools to directly date them, but the timing of the Ahrensburgian culture elsewhere suggests a date roughly corresponding to the end of the Late Pleistocene and beginning of the Holocene, around 12,500-11,000 years ago.

A Mesolithic hunter-gatherer site dating to the seventh millennium BC at An Corran in Staffin is one of the oldest archaeological sites in Scotland. Its occupation is probably linked to that of the rock shelter at Sand, Applecross, on the mainland coast of Wester Ross, where tools made of a mudstone from An Corran have been found. Surveys of the area between the two shores of the Inner Sound and Sound of Raasay have revealed 33 sites with potentially Mesolithic deposits. Finds of bloodstone microliths on the foreshore at Orbost on the west coast of the island near Dunvegan also suggest Mesolithic occupation. These tools probably originated from the nearby island of Rùm. Similarly, bloodstone from Rum, and baked mudstone, from the Staffin area, were found at the Mesolithic site of Camas Daraich, also from the seventh millennium BC, on the Point of Sleat, which has led archaeologists to believe that Mesolithic people on Skye would travel fairly significant distances, at least 70 km, both by land and sea.

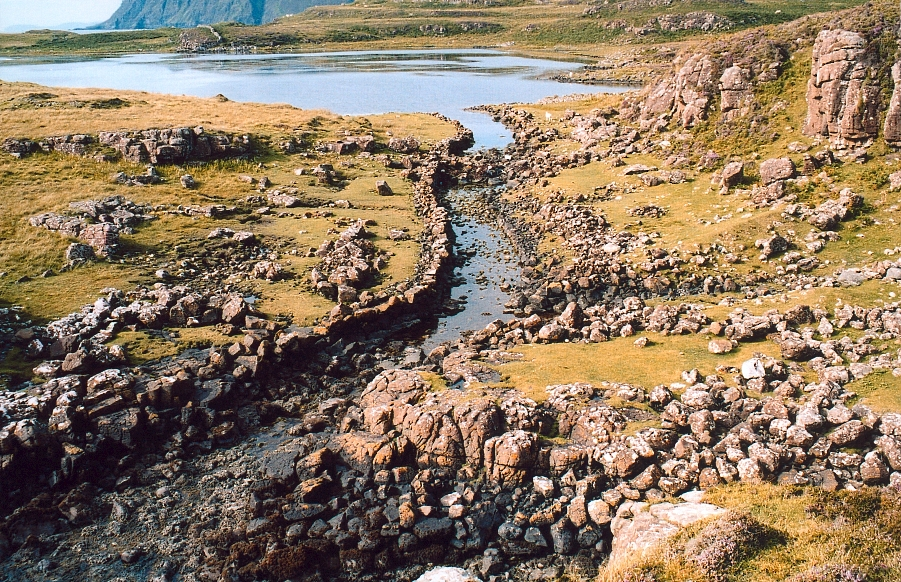
The "Viking canal" at Rubha an Dùnain

Rubha an Dùnain, an uninhabited peninsula to the south of the Cuillin, has a variety of archaeological sites dating from the Neolithic onwards. A second- or third-millennium BC chambered cairn, an Iron Age promontory fort, and the remains of another prehistoric settlement dating from the Bronze Age are nearby. Loch na h-Airde on the peninsula is linked to the sea by an artificial "Viking" canal that may date from the later period of Norse settlement. Dun Ringill is a ruined Iron Age hill fort on the Strathaird Peninsula, which was further fortified in the Middle Ages and may have become the seat of Clan MacKinnon.

=== Early history ===
The late Iron Age inhabitants of the northern and western Hebrides were probably Pictish, although the historical record is sparse. Three Pictish symbol stones have been found on Skye and a fourth on Raasay. More is known of the kingdom of Dál Riata to the south; Adomnán's life of Columba, written shortly before 697, portrays the saint visiting Skye (where he baptised a pagan leader using an interpreter) and Adomnán himself is thought to have been familiar with the island. The Irish annals record several events on Skye in the later seventh and early eighth centuries – mainly concerning the struggles between rival dynasties that formed the background to the Old Irish language romance Scéla Cano meic Gartnáin.

Legendary hero Cú Chulainn is said to have trained on the Isle of Skye with warrior woman Scáthach.

The Norse held sway throughout the Hebrides from the 9th century until after the Treaty of Perth in 1266. However, apart from placenames, little remains of their presence on Skye in the written or archaeological record. Apart from the name "Skye" itself, all pre-Norse placenames seem to have been obliterated by the Scandinavian settlers. Viking heritage, with Celtic heritage is claimed by Clan MacLeod. Norse tradition is celebrated in the winter fire festival at Dunvegan, during which a replica Viking longboat is set alight.

=== Clans and Scottish rule ===
The most powerful clans on Skye in the post–Norse period were Clan MacLeod, originally based in Trotternish, and Clan Macdonald of Sleat. The isle was held by Donald Macdonald, Lord of the Isles' half-brother, Godfrey, from 1389 until 1401, at which time Skye was declared part of Ross. When Donald Macdonald, Lord of the Isles, re-gained Ross after the battle of Harlaw in 1411, they added "Earl of Ross" to their lords' titles. Skye came with Ross.

Following the disintegration of the Lordship of the Isles in the late 15th century, Clan Mackinnon also emerged as an independent clan, whose substantial landholdings in Skye were centred on Strathaird. Clan MacNeacail also have a long association with Trotternish, and in the 16th century many of the MacInnes clan moved to Sleat. The MacDonalds of South Uist were bitter rivals of the MacLeods, and an attempt by the former to murder church-goers at Trumpan Church in retaliation for a previous massacre on Eigg, resulted in the Battle of the Spoiling Dyke of 1578.

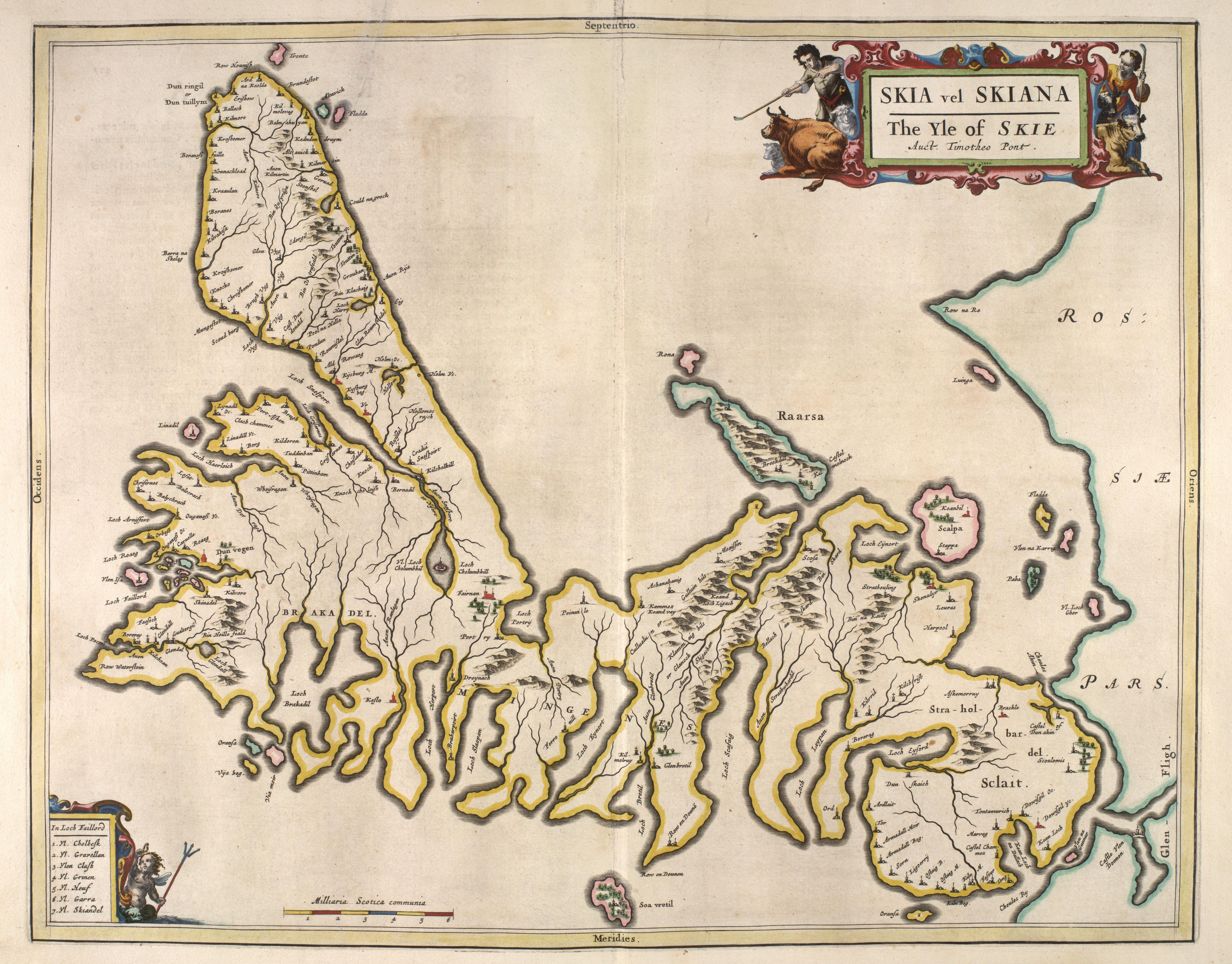
Skye as shown on Blaeu's 1654 Atlas of Scotland

After the failure of the Jacobite rebellion of 1745, Flora MacDonald became famous for rescuing Prince Charles Edward Stuart from the Hanoverian troops. Although she was born in South Uist, her story is strongly associated with their escape via Skye, and she is buried at Kilmuir in Trotternish. Samuel Johnson and James Boswell's visit to Skye in 1773 and their meeting with Flora MacDonald in Kilmuir is recorded in Boswell's The Journal of a Tour to the Hebrides. Boswell wrote, "To see Dr. Samuel Johnson, the great champion of the English Tories, salute Miss Flora MacDonald in the isle of Sky, [sic] was a striking sight; for though somewhat congenial in their notions, it was very improbable they should meet here". Johnson's words that Flora MacDonald was "A name that will be mentioned in history, and if courage and fidelity be virtues, mentioned with honour" are written on her gravestone. After this rebellion, the clan system was broken up and Skye became a series of landed estates.

Of the island in general, Johnson observed:

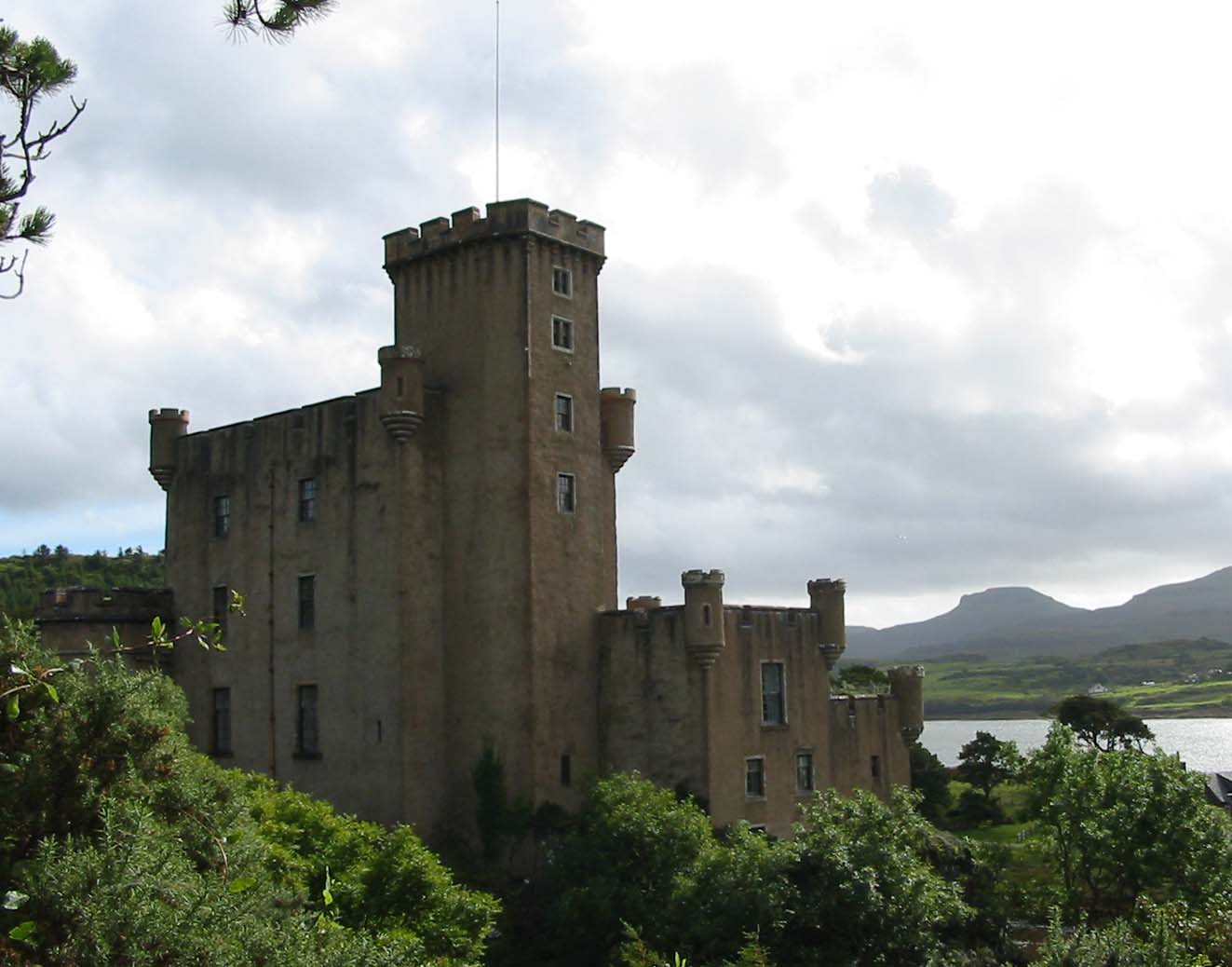
Dunvegan Castle, looking towards MacLeod's Tables

I never was in any house of the islands, where I did not find books in more languages than one, if I staid long enough to want them, except one from which the family was removed. Literature is not neglected by the higher rank of the Hebrideans. It need not, I suppose, be mentioned, that in countries so little frequented as the islands, there are no houses where travellers are entertained for money. He that wanders about these wilds, either procures recommendations to those whose habitations lie near his way, or, when night and weariness come upon him, takes the chance of general hospitality. If he finds only a cottage he can expect little more than shelter; for the cottagers have little more for themselves but if his good fortune brings him to the residence of a gentleman, he will be glad of a storm to prolong his stay. There is, however, one inn by the sea-side at Sconsor, in Sky, where the post-office is kept.

— Samuel Johnson, A Journey to the Western Islands of Scotland.

Skye has a rich heritage of ancient monuments from this period. Dunvegan Castle has been the seat of Clan MacLeod since the 13th century. It contains the Fairy Flag and is reputed to have been inhabited by a single family for longer than any other house in Scotland. The 18th-century Armadale Castle, once the home of Clan Donald of Sleat, was abandoned as a residence in 1925, but now hosts the Clan Donald Centre. Nearby are the ruins of two more MacDonald strongholds, Knock Castle, and Dunscaith Castle (called "Fortress of Shadows"), the legendary home of warrior woman, martial arts instructor (and, according to some sources, Queen) Scáthach. Caisteal Maol, a fortress built in the late 15th century near Kyleakin and once a seat of Clan MacKinnon, is another ruin.

=== Economic turmoil and mass emigration ===
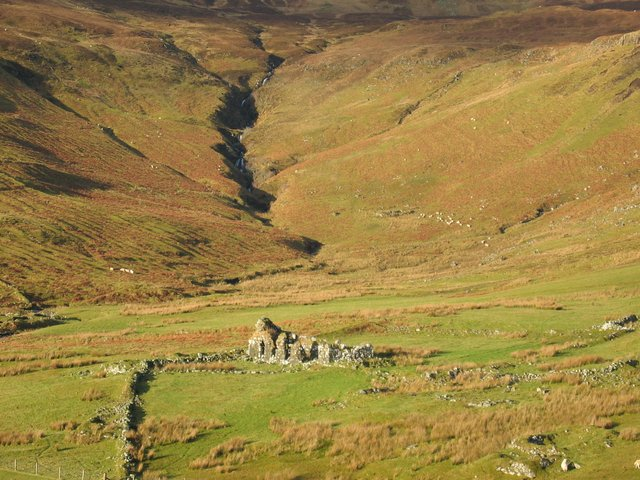
Ruins in the cleared landscape of Tusdale, once so populous that it was nicknamed "the capital of Skye".

In the late 18th century the harvesting of kelp became a significant activity, but from 1822 onward cheap imports led to a collapse of this industry throughout the Hebrides. During the 19th century, the inhabitants of Skye were also devastated by famine and Clearances. Thirty thousand people were evicted between 1840 and 1880 alone, many of them forced to emigrate to the New World. The "Battle of the Braes" involved a demonstration against a lack of access to land and the serving of eviction notices. The incident involved numerous crofters and about 50 police officers. This event was instrumental in the creation of the Napier Commission, which reported in 1884 on the situation in the Highlands. Disturbances continued until the passing of the 1886 Crofters' Act and on one occasion 400 marines were deployed on Skye to maintain order. The ruins of cleared villages can still be seen at Lorgill, Boreraig and Suisnish in Strath Swordale, and Tusdale on Minginish.

=== Overview of population trends ===
Year	1755	1794	1821	1841	1881	1891	1931	1951	1961	1971	1981	1991	2001	2011	2022
Population	11,252	14,470	20,827	23,082	16,889	15,705	9,908	8,537	7,479	7,183	7,276	8,847	9,232	10,008	10,496

As with many Scottish islands, Skye's population peaked in the 19th century and then declined under the impact of the Clearances and the military losses in the First World War. From the 19th century until 1975 Skye was part of the county of Inverness-shire, but the crofting economy languished and according to Slesser, "Generations of UK governments have treated the island people contemptuously"—a charge that has been levelled at both Labour and Conservative administrations' policies in the Highlands and Islands. (Note: The theme of government neglect has been repeated by commentators spanning more than a century. "[The landlords] persuaded the Government for the second time to put the country to the expense of a naval expedition to Skye to exhibit Highlanders to the world as a race of men who could only be governed at the point of the bayonet, and that simply because the Commissioners had neglected to perform and pay for the duty the law imposed on them. (Cheers)." Sir Charles Cameron (1886). "Nationalist MPs and crofters, frustrated by the failure of Westminster politicians to bring Scotland into line with England and other European nations by abolishing feudal structures and regulating land use, are drawing up plans to limit foreign land ownership and introduce environmental codes for all estates. They want ministers to compile a full public Land Register." John Arlidge (1996).) By 1971 the population was less than a third of its peak recorded figure in 1841. However, the number of residents then grew by over 28 percent in the thirty years to 2001. The changing relationship between the residents and the land is evidenced by Robert Carruthers's remark c. 1852, "There is now a village in Portree containing three hundred inhabitants." Even if this estimate is inexact the population of the island's largest settlement has probably increased sixfold or more since then. During the period the total number of island residents has declined by 50 percent or more. (Note: Carruthers was the editor of the National Illustrated Library's 1852 edition of Boswell (1785) who added a footnote to this effect.)The island-wide population increase of 4 percent between 1991 and 2001 occurred against the background of an overall reduction in Scottish island populations of 3 percent for the same period. By 2011 the population had risen a further 8.4% to 10,008 with Scottish island populations as a whole growing by 4% to 13,702.

== Language ==
Pronunciation
- Scots Gaelic: An t-Eilean Sgitheanach
- Pronunciation: [əɲ ˈtʲʰelan ˈs̪kʲi.anəx]
- Scots Gaelic: Am Binnean Dearg
- Pronunciation: [əm ˈpiɲan ˈtʲɛɾak]
- Scots Gaelic: An Corran
- Pronunciation: [əŋ ˈkʰɔrˠan]
- Scots Gaelic: An Cuan Sgìth
- Pronunciation: [ən̪ˠ ˈkʰuən s̪kʲiː]
- Scots Gaelic: An Tìr, an Cànan 's na Daoine
- Pronunciation: [ən̪ˠ ˈtʲʰiːɾʲ əŋ ˈkʰanan s̪nə ˈtɯːɲə]
- Scots Gaelic: Eilean a' Cheò
- Pronunciation: [ˈelan ə ˈçɔː]
- Scots Gaelic: Loch na h-Àirde
- Pronunciation: [ˈl̪ˠɔx nə ˈhaːrˠtʲə]
- Scots Gaelic: Mac na Mara
- Pronunciation: [ˈmaxk nə ˈmaɾə]
- Scots Gaelic: Poit Dhubh
- Pronunciation: [ˈpʰɔʰtʲ ˈɣu]
- Scots Gaelic: Pràban na Linne
- Pronunciation: [ˈpʰɾaːpan nə ˈʎiɲə]
- Scots Gaelic: Tè Bheag nan Eilean
- Pronunciation: [tʲʰeˈvek nə ˈɲelan]
- Scots Gaelic: Sgiathan
- Pronunciation: [ˈs̪kʲiəhən]
- Scots Gaelic: Sgitheanach
- Pronunciation: [ˈs̪kʲi.anəx]

Historically, Skye was overwhelmingly Gaelic-speaking, but this changed between 1921 and 2001. In both the 1901 and 1921 censuses, all Skye parishes were more than 75 percent Gaelic-speaking. By 1971, only Kilmuir parish had more than three-quarters of Gaelic speakers while the rest of Skye ranged between 50 and 74 percent. At that time, Kilmuir was the only area outside the Western Isles that had such a high proportion of Gaelic speakers. In the 2001 census Kilmuir had just under half Gaelic speakers, and overall, Skye had 31 percent, distributed unevenly. The strongest Gaelic areas were in the north and southwest of the island, including Staffin at 61 percent. The weakest areas were in the west and east (e.g. Luib 23 percent and Kylerhea 19 percent). Other areas on Skye ranged between 48 percent and 25 percent.

== Government and politics ==
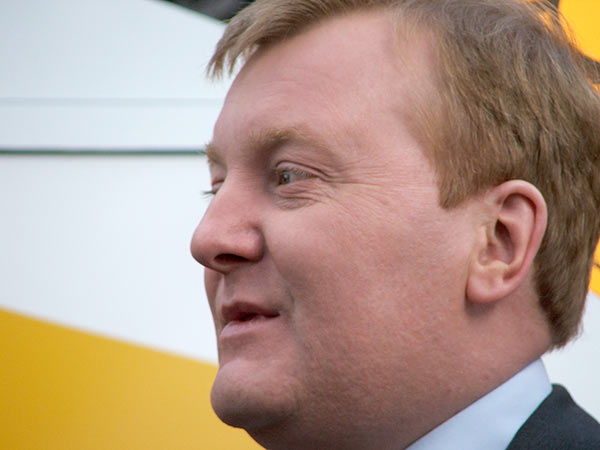
Charles Kennedy was the MP for the constituency covering Skye between 1983 and 2015.

In terms of local government, from 1975 to 1996, Skye, along with the neighbouring mainland area of Lochalsh, constituted a local government district within the Highland administrative area. In 1996 the district was included in the unitary Highland Council, (Comhairle na Gàidhealtachd) based in Inverness and formed one of the new council's area committees. Following the 2007 elections, Skye now forms a four-member ward called Eilean a' Cheò; it is currently represented by two independents, one Scottish National Party, and one Liberal Democrat councillor.

Skye is in the Highlands and Islands electoral region and comprises a part of the Skye, Lochaber and Badenoch constituency of the Scottish Parliament, which elects one member under the first past the post basis to represent it. Andrew Baxter is the current MSP for the Liberal Democrats. In addition, Skye forms part of the wider Ross, Skye and Lochaber constituency, which elects one member to the House of Commons in Westminster.

The present Member of Parliament is Liberal Democrat Angus MacDonald, who won his seat at the 2024 general election. Prior to this it was represented by Ian Blackford of the Scottish National Party, who took office after the SNP's sweep in the General Election of 2015. Before this, Charles Kennedy, a Liberal Democrat, had represented the area since the 1983 general election.

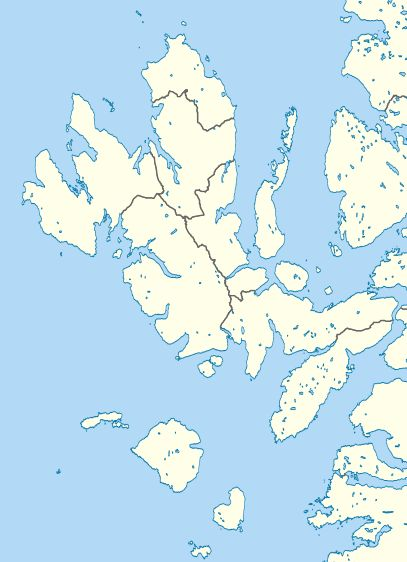

There are seven civil parishes on the island, as shown in the map above.

== Economy ==
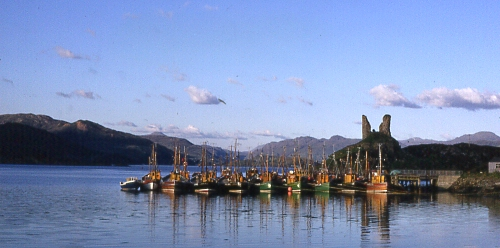
Caisteal Maol and fishing boats in Kyleakin harbour

The largest employer on the island and its environs is the public sector, which accounts for about a third of the total workforce, principally in administration, education, and health. The second-largest employer in the area is the distribution, hotels, and restaurants sector, highlighting the importance of tourism. Key attractions include Dunvegan Castle and the Clan Donald Visitor Centre. There are about a dozen large landowners on Skye, the largest being the public sector, with the Scottish Government owning most of the northern part of the island. Glendale is a community-owned estate in Duirinish, and the Sleat Community Trust, the local development trust, is active in various regeneration projects.

Small firms dominate employment in the private sector. The Talisker Distillery, which produces a single malt whisky, is beside Loch Harport on the west coast of the island. Torabhaig distillery located in Teangue opened in 2017 and also produces whisky. Three other whiskies—Mac na Mara ('son of the sea'), Tè Bheag nan Eilean ('wee dram of the isles') and Poit Dhubh ('black pot')—are produced by blender Pràban na Linne ('smugglers den by the Sound of Sleat'), based at Eilean Iarmain. These are marketed using predominantly Gaelic-language labels. The blended whisky branded as "Isle of Skye" is produced not on the island but by the Glengoyne Distillery at Killearn north of Glasgow, though the website of the owners, Ian MacLeod Distillers Ltd., boasts a "high proportion of Island malts" and contains advertisements for tourist businesses in the island. There is also an established software presence on Skye, with Portree-based Sitekit having expanded in recent years.

Isle of Skye (Isle of Skye)

Crofting is still important, but although there are about 2,000 crofts on Skye only 100 or so are large enough to enable a crofter to earn a livelihood entirely from the land. In recent years, families have complained about the increasing prices for land that make it difficult for young people to start their own crofts.

Cod and herring stocks have declined but commercial fishing remains important, especially fish farming of salmon and crustaceans such as scampi. The west coast of Scotland has a considerable renewable energy potential and the Isle of Skye Renewables Co-op has recently bought a stake in the Ben Aketil wind farm near Dunvegan. There is a thriving arts and crafts sector.

The unemployment rate in the area tends to be higher than in the Highlands as a whole, and is seasonal, in part due to the impact of tourism. The population is growing and in common with many other scenic rural areas in Scotland, significant increases are expected in the percentage of the population aged 45 to 64 years.

The restrictions required by the worldwide pandemic increased unemployment in the Highlands and Islands in the summer of 2020 to 5.7%; which was significantly higher than the 2.4 percent in 2019. The rates were said to be highest in "Lochaber, Skye and Wester Ross and Argyll and the Islands". A December 2020 report stated that between March (just before the effects of pandemic were noted) and December, the unemployment rate in the region increased by "more than 97%" and suggested that the outlook was even worse for spring 2021.

=== Tourism ===
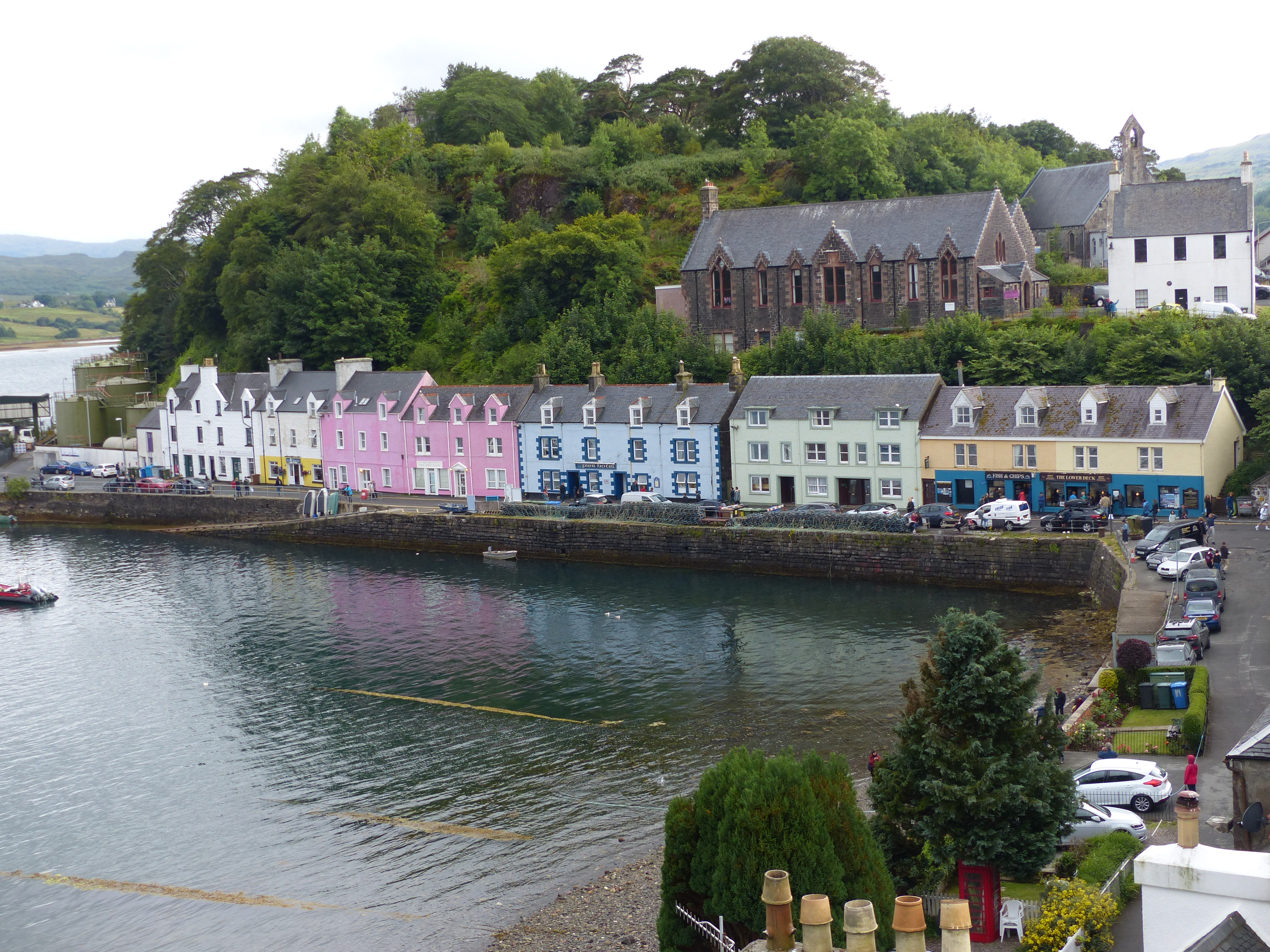
Portree was chosen as one of the "20 most beautiful villages in the UK and Ireland" by Condé Nast Traveler and is visited by many tourists each year.

Visits to Skye had been steadily increasing prior to the COVID-19 pandemic. In 2019, Skye added £211 million to the island's economy; Skye and Raasay had some 650,000 visitors in 2018, supporting an estimated 2,850 jobs. The pandemic, and travel restrictions imposed due to it, led to a sharp decline in tourism in Skye and the rest of the Highlands and Islands region. After the pandemic, tourism rebounded; with tourist numbers expected to break records in 2024. The Old Man of Storr is among the island's most popular sites for tourists, attracting more than a quarter-million visitors annually.

Pre-pandemic, some islanders complained about perceived tourist overcrowding in popular locations, including the Old Man of Storr and Quiraing (both on the Trotternish escarpment) as well as Glen Brittle and Neist Point lighthouse. Post-pandemic, the Rural Tourism Infrastructure Fund funded improvements to visitor infrastructure at Blà Bheinn and the Trotternish Ridge.

== Transport ==
Skye is linked to the mainland by the Skye Bridge, while ferries sail from Armadale on the island to Mallaig, and from Kylerhea to Glenelg, crossing the Kyle Rhea strait on the MV Glenachulish, the last turntable ferry in the world. Turntable ferries had been common on the west coast of Scotland because they do not require much infrastructure to operate, a boat ramp will suffice. Ferries also run from Uig to Tarbert on Harris and Lochmaddy on North Uist, and from Sconser to Raasay.

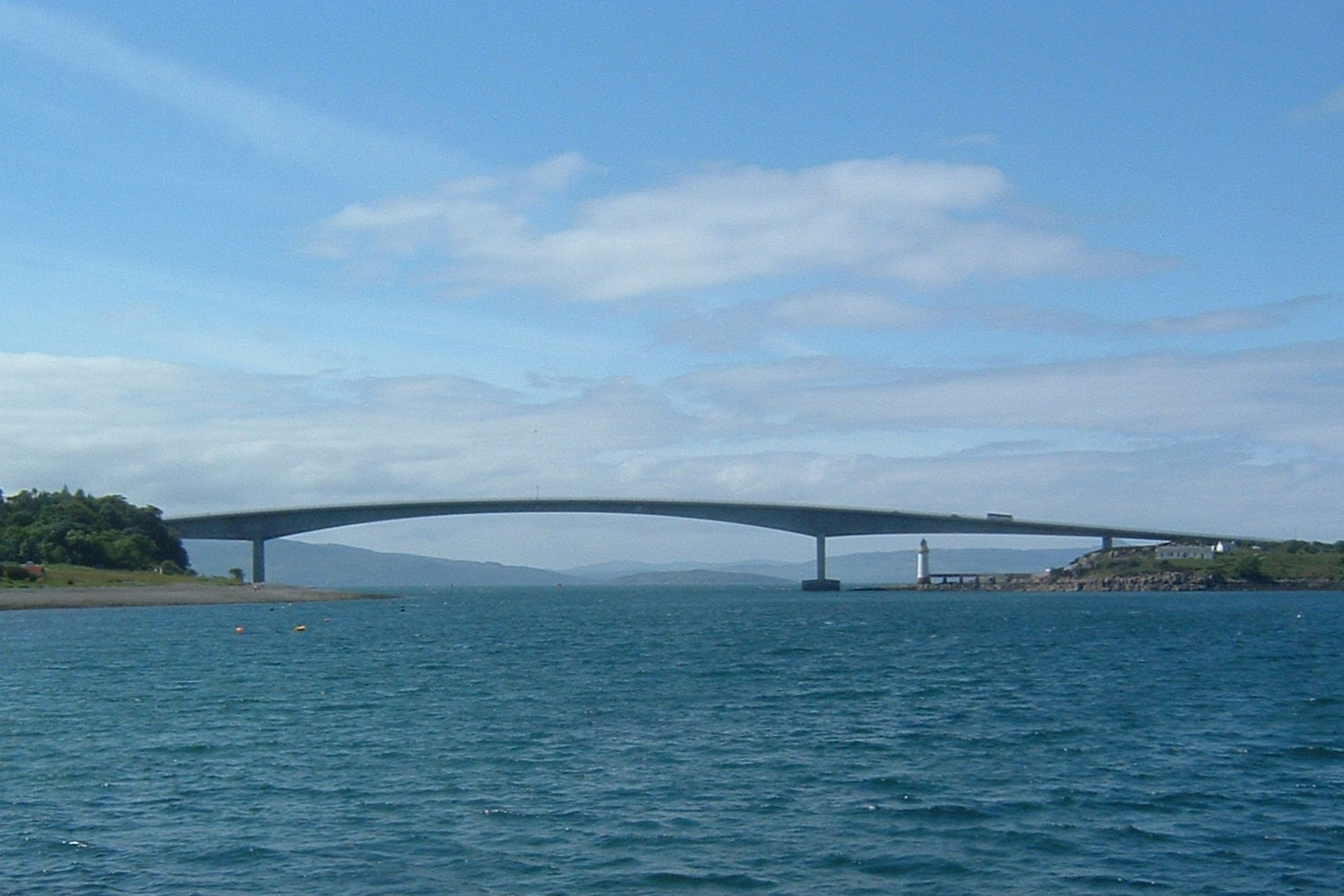
The Skye Bridge, linking Kyle of Lochalsh to Skye

The Skye Bridge opened in 1995 under a private finance initiative and the high tolls charged (£5.70 each way for summer visitors) met with widespread opposition, spearheaded by the pressure group SKAT (Skye and Kyle Against Tolls). On 21 December 2004, it was announced that the Scottish Executive had purchased the bridge from its owners and the tolls were immediately removed.

Bus services run to Inverness and Glasgow, and there are local services on the island, mainly starting from Portree or Broadford. Train services run from Kyle of Lochalsh at the mainland end of the Skye Bridge to Inverness, as well as from Glasgow to Mallaig from where the ferry can be caught to Armadale.

The island's airfield at Ashaig, near Broadford, is used by private aircraft and occasionally by NHS Highland and the Scottish Ambulance Service for transferring patients to hospitals on the mainland.

The A87 trunk road traverses the island from the Skye Bridge to Uig, linking most of the major settlements. Many of the island's roads have been widened in the past forty years although there are still substantial sections of single-track road.

== Culture, media, and the arts ==
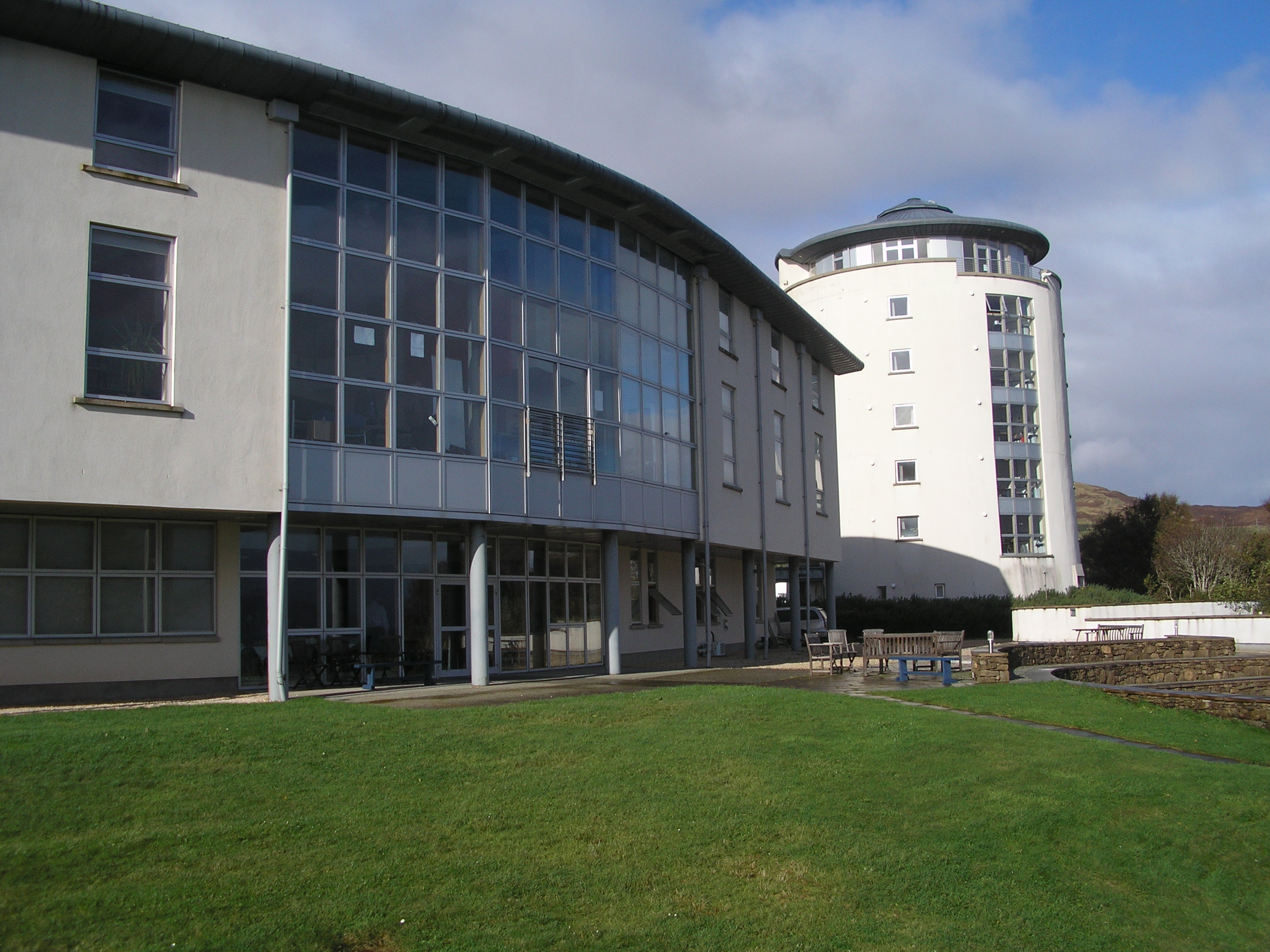
The new college buildings, Sabhal Mòr Ostaig

Students of Scottish Gaelic travel from all over the world to attend Sabhal Mòr Ostaig, the Scottish Gaelic college located near Kilmore in Sleat. In addition to members of the Church of Scotland and a smaller number of Roman Catholics, many residents of Skye belong to the Free Church of Scotland, known for its strict observance of the Sabbath. (Note: The 2001 census statistics used are based on local authority areas and do not specifically identify Free Church adherents. However, the averages for Highland and Eilean Siar, between which the total for Skye is likely to lie are 48–42 percent Church of Scotland, 7–13 percent Roman Catholic and 12–28 percent "Other Christian", of whom the majority will be Free Church members. The total for all other religions combined is 1 percent for both areas.)

Skye has a strong folk music tradition, although in recent years dance and rock music have been growing in popularity on the island. Gaelic folk rock band Runrig started in Skye and former singer Donnie Munro still works on the island. Runrig's second single and a concert staple is entitled "Skye", the lyrics being partly in English and partly in Gaelic and they have released other songs such as "Nightfall on Marsco" that were inspired by the island. Celtic fusion band the Peatbog Faeries are based on Skye. Jethro Tull frontman Ian Anderson owned an estate at Strathaird on Skye at one time. Anderson wrote several songs for Jethro Tull about the island, including "Dun Ringil", "Broadford Bazaar", and "Acres Wild", the latter of which contains the lines "Come with me to the Winged Isle/Northern father's western child". The Isle of Skye Music Festival featured sets from The Fun Lovin' Criminals and Sparks, but collapsed in 2007. Electronic musician Mylo was born on Skye.

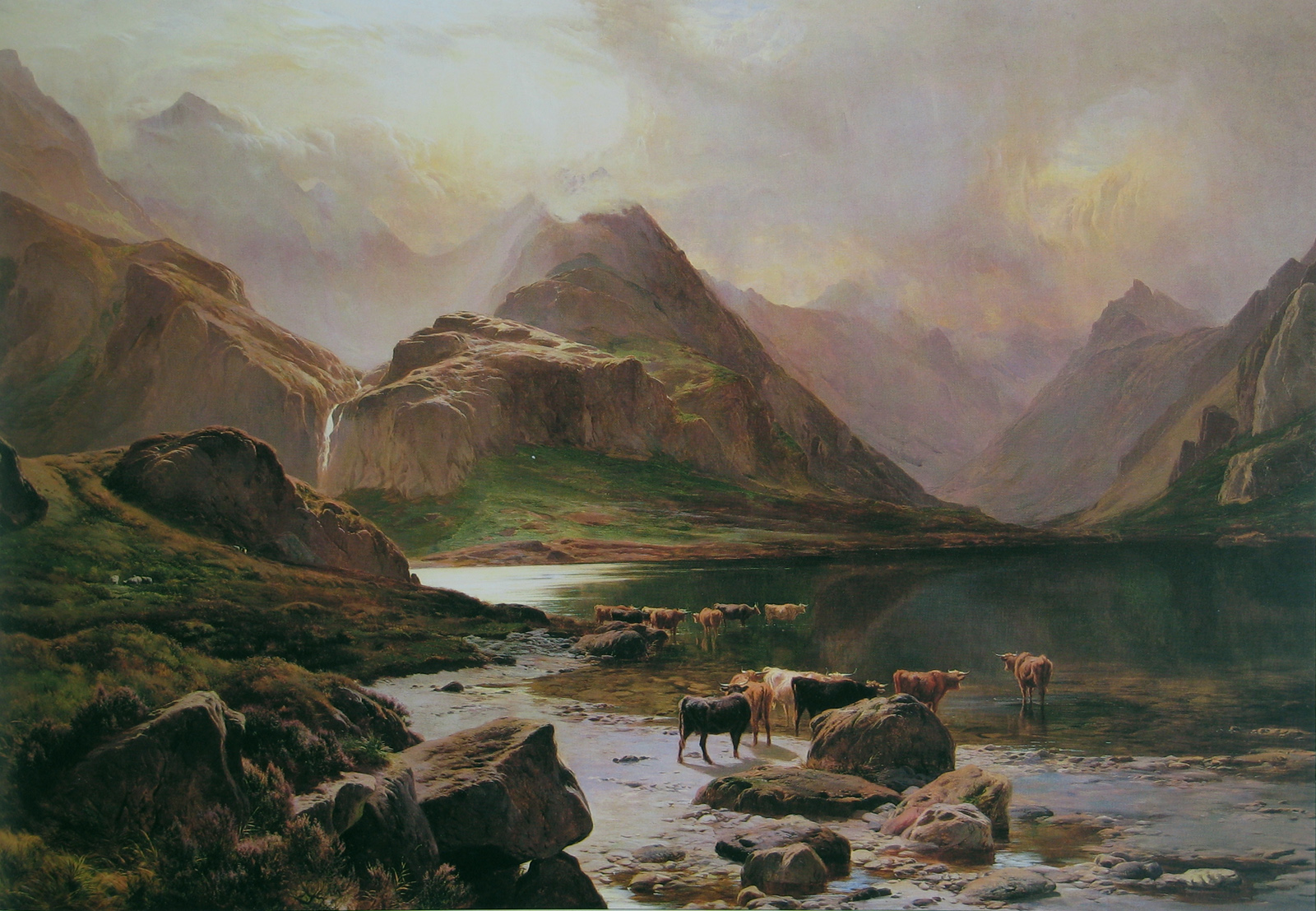
Loch Coruisk, Isle of Skye painted in 1874 by Sidney Richard Percy

The poet Sorley MacLean, a native of the Isle of Raasay, which lies off the island's east coast, lived much of his life on Skye. The island has been immortalised in the traditional song "The Skye Boat Song" and is the notional setting for the novel To the Lighthouse by Virginia Woolf, although the Skye of the novel bears little relation to the real island. John Buchan's descriptions of Skye, as featured in his Richard Hannay novel Mr Standfast, are more true to life. I Diari di Rubha Hunis is a 2004 Italian language work of non-fiction by Davide Sapienza.

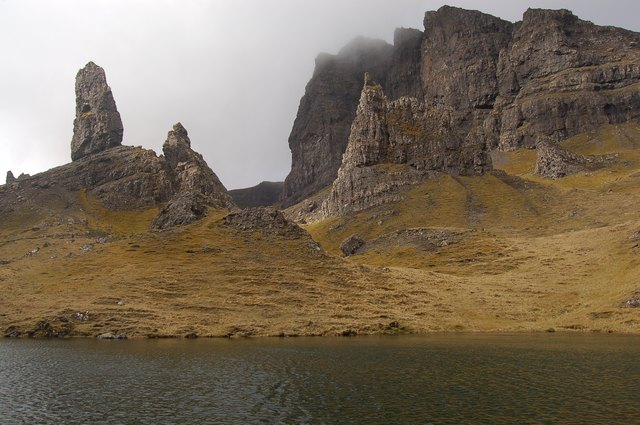
Rock pinnacles of The Storr, which feature in some of the opening scenes in the 2012 film Prometheus

Skye has been used as a location for several feature films. The Ashaig aerodrome was used for the opening scenes of the 1980 film Flash Gordon. Stardust, released in 2007 and starring Robert De Niro and Michelle Pfeiffer, featured scenes near Uig, Loch Coruisk and the Quiraing. Another 2007 film, Seachd: The Inaccessible Pinnacle, was shot almost entirely in various locations on the island. The Justin Kurzel adaption of Macbeth starring Michael Fassbender was also filmed on the Island. Some of the opening scenes in Ridley Scott's 2012 feature film Prometheus were shot and set at the Old Man of Storr. In 1973 The Highlands and Islands - a Royal Tour, a documentary about Prince Charles's visit to the Highlands and Islands, directed by Oscar Marzaroli, was shot partly on Skye. Scenes from the Scottish Gaelic-language BBC Alba television series Bannan were filmed on the island.

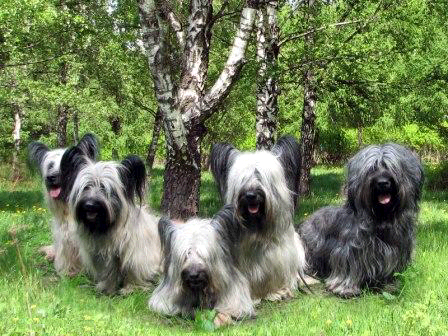
Skye Terriers

The West Highland Free Press is published at Broadford. This weekly newspaper takes as its motto An Tìr, an Cànan 's na Daoine ("The Land, the Language, and the People"), which reflects its radical, campaigning priorities. The Free Press was founded in 1972 and circulates in Skye, Wester Ross, and the Outer Hebrides. Shinty is a popular sport played throughout the island and Portree-based Skye Camanachd won the Camanachd Cup in 1990. The local radio station Radio Skye is a community based station that broadcast local news and entertainment to the Isle Of Skye and Loch Alsh on 106.2 FM and 102.7 FM.

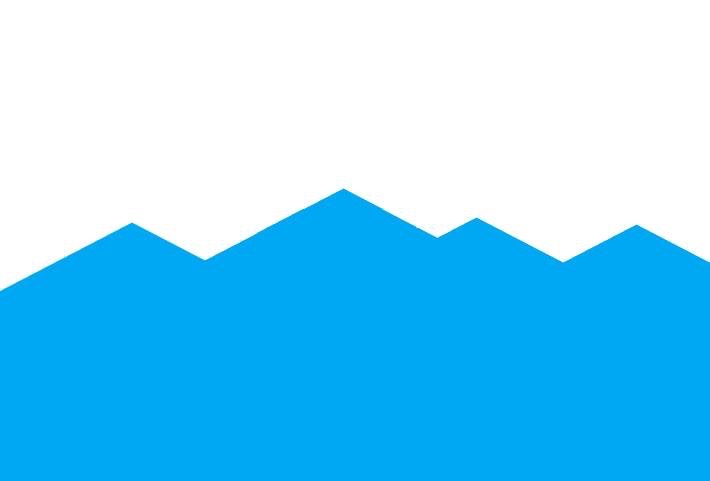
The Skye Flag until 2020

Whilst Skye had unofficial flags in the past, including the popular "Bratach nan Daoine" (Flag of the People) design which represented the Cuillins in sky blue against a white sky symbolising the Gaelic language, land struggle, and the fairy flag of Dunvegan, the Island received its first official flag "Bratach an Eilein" (The Skye Flag) approved by the Lord Lyon after a public vote in August 2020. The design by Calum Alasdair Munro reflects the Island's Gaelic heritage, the Viking heritage, and the history of Flora MacDonald. The flag has a birlinn in the canton, and there are five oars representing the five areas of Skye, Trotternish, Waternish, Duirinish, Minginish, and Sleat. Yellow represents the MacLeods, and Blue the MacDonalds or the MacKinnons.

== Wildlife ==
The Hebrides generally lack the biodiversity of mainland Britain, but like most of the larger islands, Skye still has a wide variety of species. Observing the abundance of game birds Martin wrote:

There is plenty of land and water fowl in this isle—as hawks, eagles of two kinds (the one grey and of a larger size, the other much less and black, but more destructive to young cattle), black cock, heath-hen, plovers, pigeons, wild geese, ptarmigan, and cranes. Of this latter sort I have seen sixty on the shore in a flock together. The sea fowls are malls of all kinds—coulterneb, guillemot, sea cormorant, &c. The natives observe that the latter, if perfectly black, makes no good broth, nor is its flesh worth eating; but that a cormorant, which hath any white feathers or down, makes good broth, and the flesh of it is good food; and the broth is usually drunk by nurses to increase their milk.

— Martin Martin, A Description of The Western Islands of Scotland.

Similarly, Samuel Johnson noted that:

At the tables where a stranger is received, neither plenty nor delicacy is wanting. A tract of land so thinly inhabited must have much wild-fowl; and I scarcely remember to have seen a dinner without them. The moor-game is every where to be had. That the sea abounds with fish, needs not be told, for it supplies a great part of Europe. The Isle of Sky has stags and roebucks, but no hares. They sell very numerous droves of oxen yearly to England, and therefore cannot be supposed to want beef at home. Sheep and goats are in great numbers, and they have the common domestic fowls."

— Samuel Johnson, A Journey to the Western Islands of Scotland.

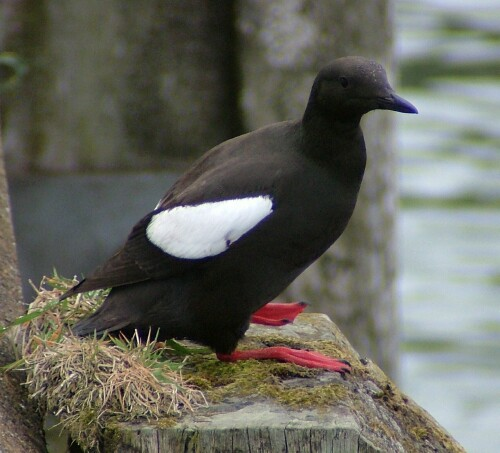
The black guillemot or tystie (Cepphus grylle)

In the modern era avian life includes the corncrake, red-throated diver, kittiwake, tystie, Atlantic puffin, goldeneye and golden eagle. The eggs of the last breeding pair of white-tailed sea eagle in the UK were taken by an egg collector on Skye in 1916 but the species has recently been re-introduced. The chough last bred on the island in 1900. Mountain hare (apparently absent in the 18th century) and rabbit are now abundant and preyed upon by wild cat and pine marten. The rich fresh water streams contain brown trout, Atlantic salmon and water shrew. Offshore the edible crab and edible oyster are also found, the latter especially in the Sound of Scalpay. There are nationally important horse mussel and brittlestar beds in the sea lochs and in 2012 a bed of 100 million flame shells was found during a survey of Loch Alsh. Grey Seals can be seen off the Southern coast.

Heather moor containing ling, bell heather, cross-leaved heath, bog myrtle and fescues is everywhere abundant. The high Black Cuillins weather too slowly to produce soil that sustains a rich plant life, but each of the main peninsulas has an individual flora. The basalt underpinnings of Trotternish produce a diversity of Arctic and alpine plants including alpine pearlwort and mossy cyphal. The low-lying fields of Waternish contain corn marigold and corn spurry. The sea cliffs of Duirinish boast mountain avens and fir clubmoss. Minginish produces fairy flax, cats-ear, and black bog rush. There is a fine example of Brachypodium-rich ash woodland at Tokavaig in Sleat incorporating silver birch, hazel, bird cherry, and hawthorn.

The local Biodiversity Action Plan recommends land management measures to control the spread of ragwort and bracken and identifies four non-native, invasive species as threatening native biodiversity: Japanese knotweed, rhododendron, New Zealand flatworm and mink. It also identifies problems of over-grazing resulting in the impoverishment of moorland and upland habitats and a loss of native woodland, caused by the large numbers of red deer and sheep.

In 2020 Clan MacLeod chief Hugh MacLeod announced a plan to reintroduce 370,000 native trees along with beaver and red squirrel populations to the clan estates on Skye, to restore a "wet desert" landscape which had depleted from years of overgrazing.

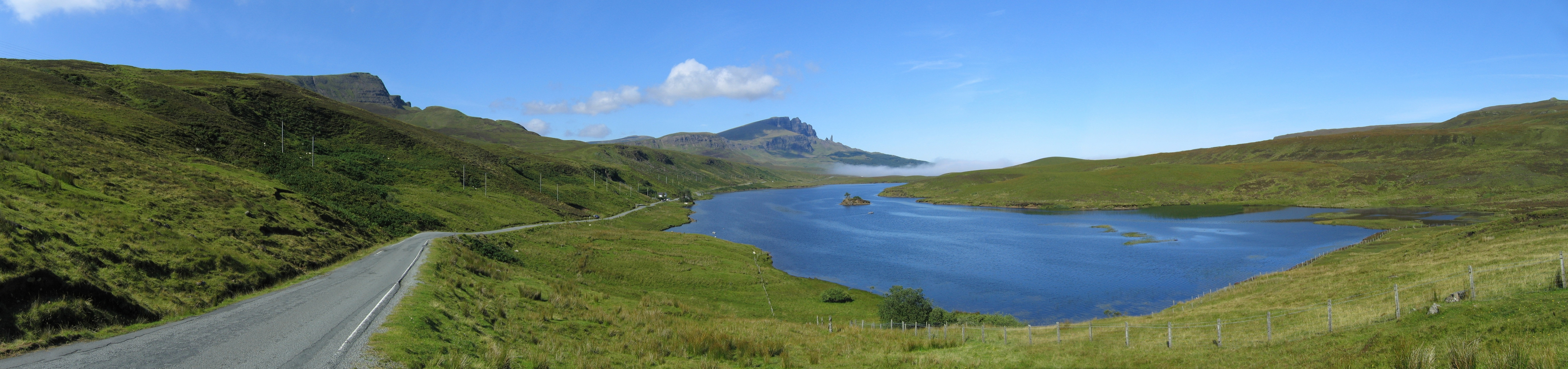
Loch Fada, Trotternish, looking towards The Storr (the mountain at centre)

== See also ==
- List of islands of Scotland
- Category:Mountains and hills of the Isle of Skye
- Timeline of prehistoric Scotland
