= List of awards and nominations received by Julie Fowlis =

Julie Fowlis awards and nominations
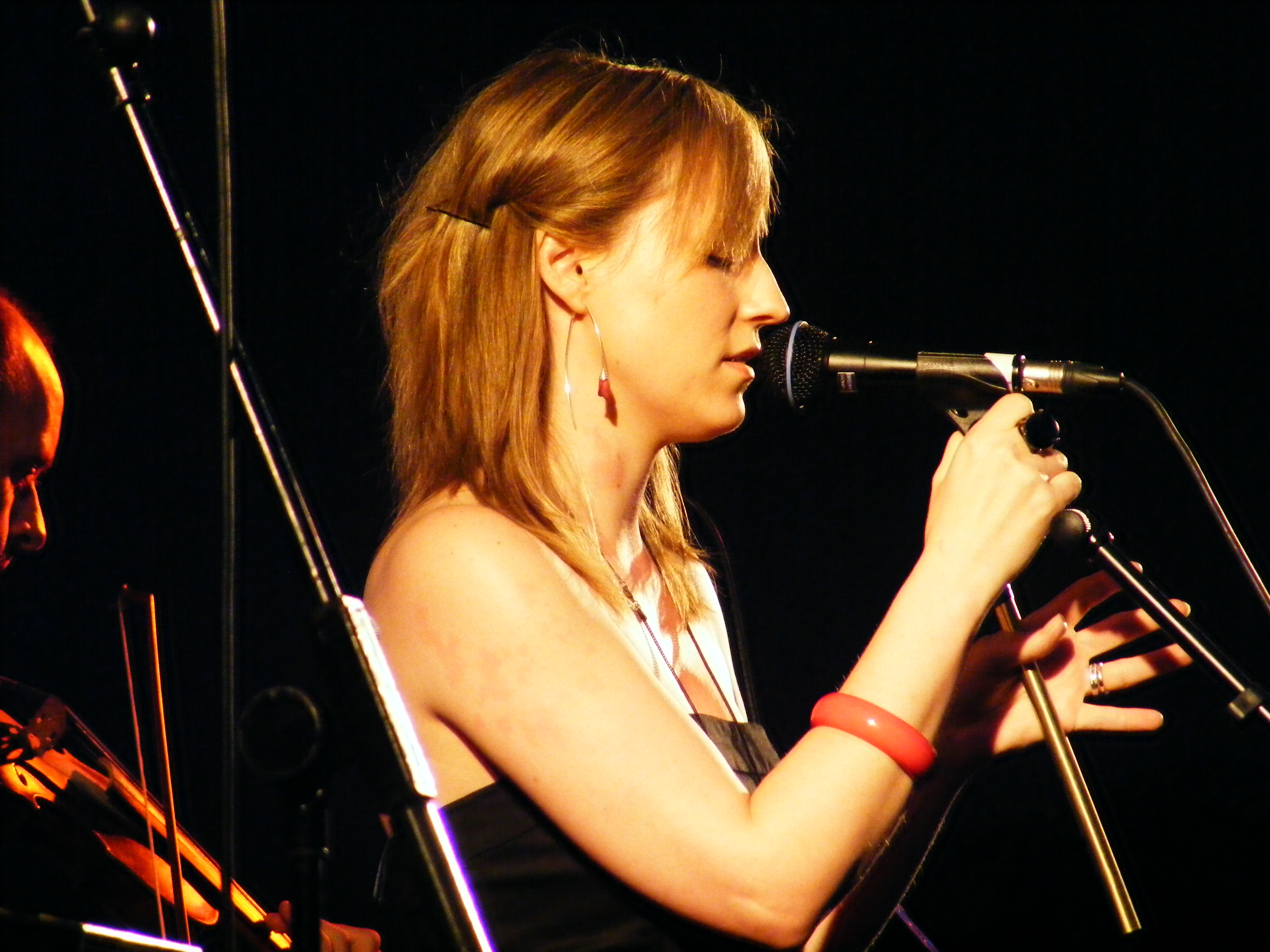
- Fowlis performing in 2008
Award	Wins	Nominations
BBC Radio 2 Folk Awards	2	3
Festival Interceltique de Lorient	1	1
Great Scot of the Year Awards	0	1
Hancock Awards	1	1
Pan Celtic Festival	1	1
Royal National Mòd	1	1
Scots Trad Music Awards	5	8
Spirit of Scotland Awards	1	1
- Totals
Awards won	12
Nominations	17

Julie Fowlis is a folk music singer-songwriter and multi-instrumentalist from Scotland.

== BBC Radio 2 Folk Awards ==
The BBC Radio 2 Folk Awards celebrate outstanding achievement within the field of folk music. Fowlis has received two awards from three nominations.

Year	Nominated work	Award	Result	Ref.
2006	Julie Fowlis	Horizon Award	Won	
2007	Julie Fowlis	Folk Singer of the Year	Nominated	
2008	Julie Fowlis	Folk Singer of the Year	Won	

== Festival Interceltique de Lorient ==
The Festival Interceltique de Lorient is an annual Celtic music festival in France. Fowlis has received one award from one nomination.

Year	Nominated work	Award	Result	Ref.
2000	Julie Fowlis	La Trophe La Bolee de Corrigans	Won	

== Great Scot of the Year Awards ==
The Great Scot of the Year Awards recognize the achievements of Scottish people from a variety of fields including music, business and sport. Fowlis has been nominated once.

Year	Nominated work	Award	Result	Ref.
2011	Julie Fowlis	Great Scot of the Year	Nominated	

== Hancock Awards ==
The Hancock Awards, named after Carey "Ces' Hancock, are awards for folk music singers and composers. Fowlis has received one award from one nomination.

Year	Nominated work	Award	Result	Ref.
2009	Julie Fowlis	Singer of the Year	Won	

== Pan Celtic Festival ==
The Pan Celtic Festival is held annually in Ireland to promote Celtic languages and cultures. Fowlis has received one award from one nomination.

Year	Nominated work	Award	Result	Ref.
2003	Julie Fowlis	Traditional Singer of the Year	Won	

== Royal National Mòd ==
The Royal National Mòd is an annual festival featuring Gaelic music, art and culture in Scotland. Fowlis has received one award from one nomination.

Year	Nominated work	Award	Result	Ref.
2008	Julie Fowlis	Gaelic Ambassador of the Year	Won	

== Scots Trad Music Awards ==
The Scots Trad Music Awards were created in 2003 by Hands Up for Trad to recognize and honour musicians who perform traditional Scottish music. Fowlis has received five awards from eight nominations.

Year	Nominated work	Award	Result	Ref.
2004	Julie Fowlis	Gaelic Singer of the Year	Nominated	
2005	Julie Fowlis	Gaelic Singer of the Year	Won	
2007	Cuilidh	Album of the Year	Won	
2007	Julie Fowlis	Gaelic Singer of the Year	Won	
2008	Julie Fowlis	Live Act of the Year	Nominated	
2009	Dual (Note: Nominated with Éamonn Doorley, Muireann Nic Amhlaoibh and Ross Martin.)	Album of the Year	Nominated	
2010	Uam	Album of the Year	Won	
2012	Brave	Trad Music in the Media	Won	

== Spirit of Scotland Awards ==
The Spirit of Scotland Awards, sponsored by Glenfiddich, is an annual prize awarded to notable Scottish people. Fowlis has received one award from one nomination.

Year	Nominated work	Award	Result	Ref.
2012	Julie Fowlis	Music Award	Won	

== Other recognitions ==
- 2010 – Fowlis was named ambassador of the Hebridean Celtic Festival and inducted into its Hall of Fame.
- 2012 – Fowlis was included in The Herald's list of "Scotland's Top 50 Influential Women of 2012".
