= Hebrides =

Archipelago off the west coast of Scotland

Coordinates: 57°00′N 07°00′W

Location
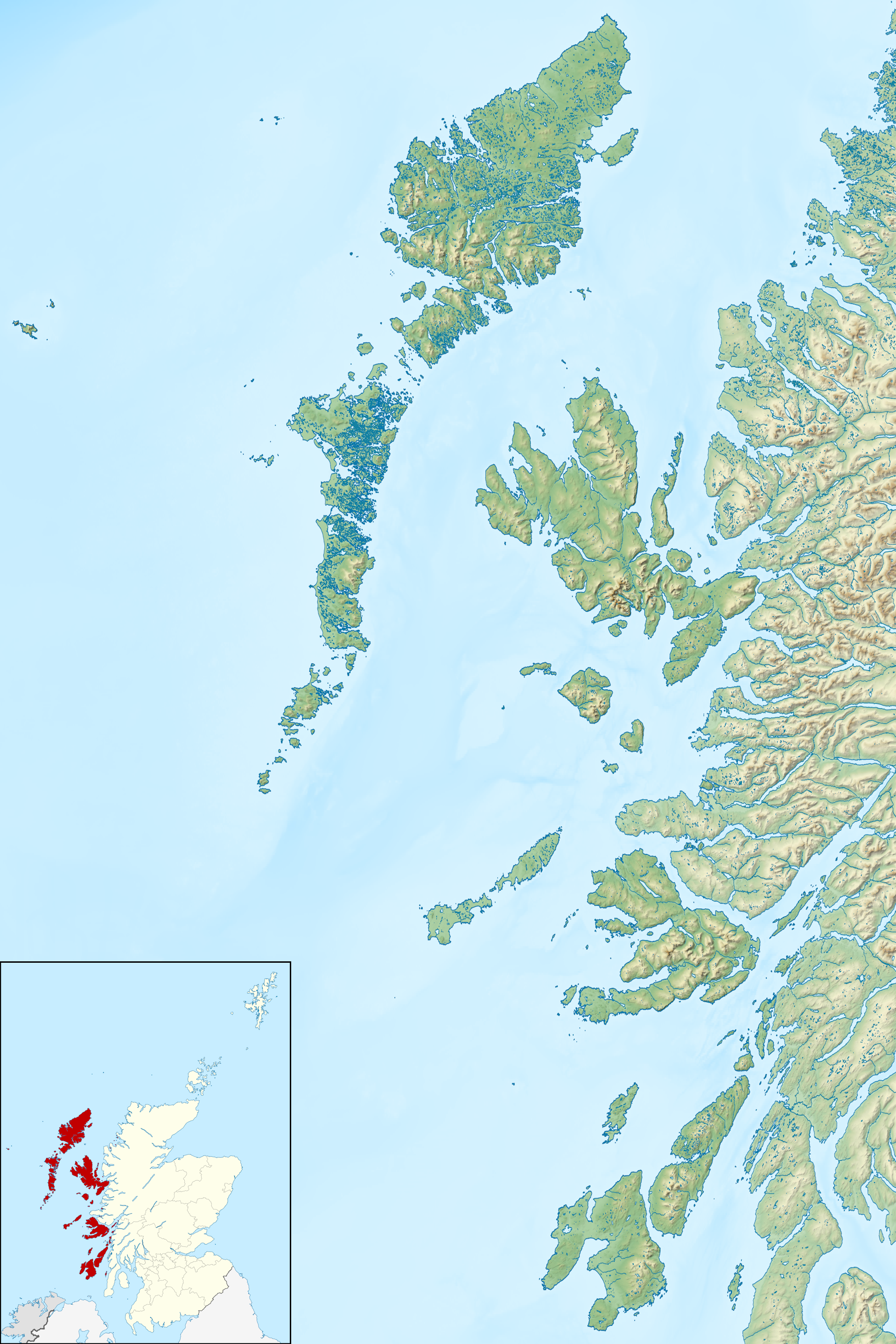
- The Hebrides
- OS grid reference: NF 96507 00992

Physical geography
- Island group: Hebrides

Administration
- Country: Scotland
- Sovereign state: United Kingdom

The Hebrides (Note: /ˈhɛbrɪdiːz/ HEB-rid-eez; Scottish Gaelic: Innse Gall, pronounced [ˈĩːʃə ˈkaul̪ˠ], lit. Islands of the Foreigners, i.e. in this context the Norsemen; Old Norse: Suðreyjar, lit. 'Southern isles') are the largest archipelago in Scotland and the British Isles, off the west coast of the Scottish mainland. The islands fall into two main groups, based on their proximity to the mainland: the Inner and Outer Hebrides.

These islands have a long history of occupation (dating back to the Mesolithic period), and the culture of the inhabitants has been successively influenced by the cultures of Celtic-speaking, Norse-speaking, and English-speaking peoples. This diversity is reflected in the various names given to the islands, which are derived from the different languages that have been spoken there at various points in their history.

The Hebrides are where much of Scottish Gaelic literature and Gaelic music has historically originated. Today, the economy of the islands is dependent on crofting, fishing, tourism, the oil industry, and renewable energy. The Hebrides have less biodiversity than mainland Scotland, but a significant number of seals and seabirds.

The islands have a combined area of 7,285 km^{2} (2,813 sq mi), and, as of 2011, a combined population of around 45,000.

== Geology, geography and climate ==
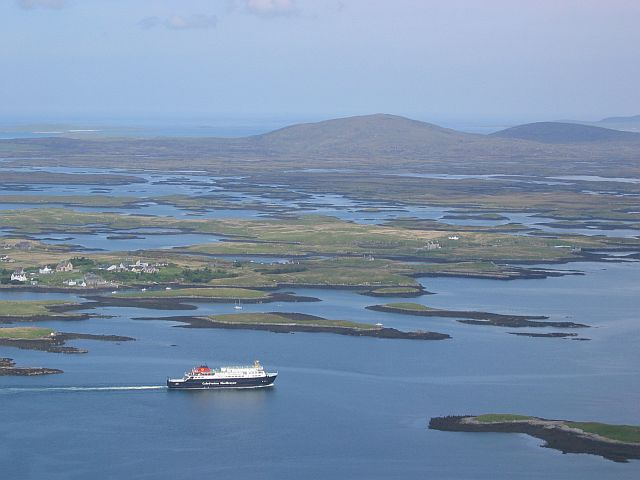
The Caledonian MacBrayne ferry MV Hebrides leaving Lochmaddy for Skye

The Hebrides have a diverse geology, ranging in age from Precambrian strata that are amongst the oldest rocks in Europe, to Paleogene igneous intrusions. (Note: Rollinson (1997) states that the oldest rocks in Europe have been found "near Gruinard Bay" on the Scottish mainland. Gillen (2003) p. 44 indicates the oldest rocks in Europe are found "in the Northwest Highlands and Outer Hebrides". McKirdy, Alan Gordon, John & Crofts, Roger (2007) Land of Mountain and Flood: The Geology and Landforms of Scotland. Edinburgh. Birlinn. p. 93 state of the Lewisian gneiss bedrock of much of the Outer Hebrides that "these rocks are amongst the oldest to be found anywhere on the planet". Other (non-geologist) sources sometimes claim that the rocks of Lewis and Harris are "the oldest in Britain", meaning that they are the oldest deposits of large bedrock. As Rollinson makes clear, Lewis and Harris is not the location of the oldest small outcrop.) Raised shore platforms in the Hebrides have been identified as strandflats, possibly formed during the Pliocene period and later modified by the Quaternary glaciations.

The Hebrides can be divided into two main groups, separated from one another by the Minch to the north and the Sea of the Hebrides to the south. The Inner Hebrides lie closer to mainland Scotland and include Islay, Jura, Skye, Mull, Raasay, Staffa and the Small Isles. There are 36 inhabited islands in this group. The Outer Hebrides form a chain of more than 100 islands and small skerries located about 70 km (45 mi) west of mainland Scotland. Among them, 15 are inhabited. The main inhabited islands include Lewis and Harris, North Uist, Benbecula, South Uist, and Barra.

A complication is that there are various descriptions of the scope of the Hebrides. The Collins Encyclopedia of Scotland describes the Inner Hebrides as lying "east of the Minch". This definition would encompass all offshore islands, including those that lie in the sea lochs, such as Eilean Bàn and Eilean Donan, which might not ordinarily be described as "Hebridean". However, no formal definition exists.

In the past, the Outer Hebrides were often referred to as the Long Isle (Scottish Gaelic: An t-Eilean Fada). Today, they are also sometimes known as the Western Isles, although this phrase can also be used to refer to the Hebrides in general. (Note: Murray (1973) notes that "Western Isles" has tended to mean "Outer Hebrides" since the creation of the Na h-Eileanan an Iar or Western Isles parliamentary constituency in 1918. Murray also notes that "Gneiss Islands" – a reference to the underlying geology – is another name used to refer to the Outer Hebrides, but that its use is "confined to books".)

The Hebrides have a cool, temperate climate that is remarkably mild and steady for such a northerly latitude, due to the influence of the Gulf Stream. In the Outer Hebrides, the average temperature is 6 °C (44 °F) in January and 14 °C (57 °F) in the summer. The average annual rainfall in Lewis is 1,100 mm (43 in), and there are between 1,100 and 1,200 hours of sunshine per annum (13%). The summer days are relatively long, and May through August is the driest period.

== Etymology ==
The earliest surviving written references to the islands were made circa 77 AD by Pliny the Elder in his Natural History: He states that there are 30 Hebudes, and makes a separate reference to Dumna, which Watson (1926) concluded refers unequivocally to the Outer Hebrides. About 80 years after Pliny the Elder, in 140–150 AD, Ptolemy (drawing on accounts of the naval expeditions of Agricola) writes that there are five Ebudes (possibly meaning the Inner Hebrides) and Dumna. Later texts in classical Latin, by writers such as Solinus, use the forms Hebudes and Hæbudes.

The name Ebudes (used by Ptolemy) may be pre-Celtic. Ptolemy calls Islay "Epidion", and the use of the letter "p" suggests a Brythonic or Pictish tribal name, Epidii, because the root is not Gaelic. Woolf (2012) has suggested that Ebudes may be "an Irish attempt to reproduce the word Epidii phonetically, rather than by translating it", and that the tribe's name may come from the root epos, meaning "horse". Watson (1926) also notes a possible relationship between Ebudes and the ancient Irish Ulaid tribal name Ibdaig, and also the personal name of a king Iubdán (recorded in the Silva Gadelica).

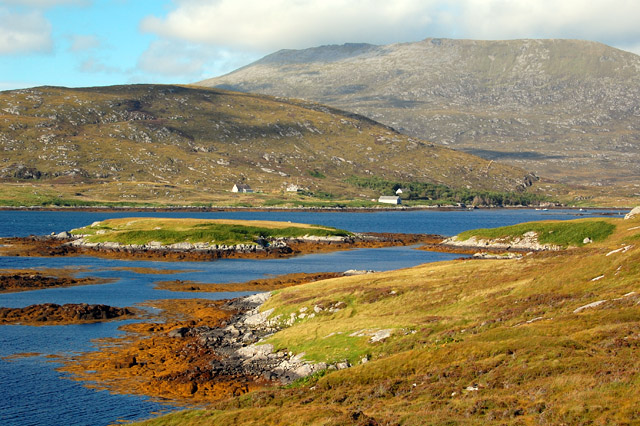
South Uist is the second-largest island of the Outer Hebrides.

The names of other individual islands reflect their complex linguistic history. The majority are Norse or Gaelic, but the roots of several other names for Hebrides islands may have a pre-Celtic origin. Adomnán, a 7th-century abbot of Iona, records Colonsay as Colosus and Tiree as Ethica, and both of these may be pre-Celtic names. The etymology of Skye is complex and may also include a pre-Celtic root. Lewis is Ljoðhús in Old Norse. Various suggestions have been made as to possible meanings of the name in Norse (for example, "song house"), but the name is not of Gaelic origin, and the Norse provenance is questionable.

The earliest comprehensive written list of Hebridean island names was compiled by Donald Monro in 1549. This list also provides the earliest written reference to the names of some of the islands.

The derivations of all the inhabited islands of the Hebrides and some of the larger uninhabited ones are listed below.

=== Outer Hebrides ===
Lewis and Harris is the largest island in Scotland and the third largest of the British Isles, after Great Britain and Ireland. It incorporates Lewis in the north and Harris in the south, both of which are frequently referred to as individual islands, although they are joined by a land border. The island does not have a single common name in either English or Gaelic and is referred to as "Lewis and Harris", "Lewis with Harris", "Harris with Lewis" etc. For this reason it is treated as two separate islands below. The derivation of Lewis may be pre-Celtic (see above) and the origin of Harris is no less problematic. In the Ravenna Cosmography, Erimon may refer to Harris (or possibly the Outer Hebrides as a whole). This word may derive from the Ancient Greek: ἐρῆμος (erimos "desert". The origin of Uist (Old Norse: Ívist) is similarly unclear.

Island	Derivation	Language	Meaning	Munro (1549)	Modern Gaelic name	Alternative Derivations
Baleshare	Am Baile Sear	Gaelic	east town		Baile Sear	
Barra	Barrey	Gaelic + Norse	Finbar's island	Barray	Barraigh	Old Gaelic barr, a summit.
Benbecula	Peighinn nam Fadhla	Gaelic	pennyland of the fords		Beinn nam Fadhla	"little mountain of the ford" or "herdsman's mountain"
Berneray	Bjarnarey	Norse	Bjorn's island		Beàrnaraigh	bear island
Eriskay	Uruisg + ey	Gaelic + Norse	goblin or water nymph island	Eriskeray	Èirisgeigh	Erik's island
Flodaigh		Norse	float island		Flodaigh	
Great Bernera	Bjarnarey	Norse	Bjorn's island	Berneray-Moir	Beàrnaraigh Mòr	bear island
Grimsay (Note: There are two inhabited islands called "Grimsay" or Griomasaigh that are joined to Benbecula by a road causeway, one to the north at grid reference NF855572 and one to the south east at grid reference NF831473.)	Grímsey	Norse	Grim's island		Griomasaigh	
Grimsay (Note: See above note.)	Grímsey	Norse	Grim's island		Griomasaigh	
Harris	Erimon?	Ancient Greek?	desert?	Harrey	na Hearadh	Ptolemy's Adru. In Old Norse (and in modern Icelandic), a Hérað is a type of administrative district. Alternatives are the Norse haerri, meaning "hills" and Gaelic na h-airdibh meaning "the heights".
Lewis	Limnu	Pre-Celtic?	marshy	Lewis	Leòdhas	Ptolemy's Limnu is literally "marshy". The Norse Ljoðhús may mean "song house" – see above.
North Uist		English + Pre-Celtic?		Ywst	Uibhist a Tuath	"Uist" may possibly be "corn island" or "west"
Scalpay	Skalprey	Norse	scallop island	Scalpay of Harray	Sgalpaigh na Hearadh	
Seana Bhaile		Gaelic	old township		Seana Bhaile	
South Uist		English + Pre-Celtic?			Uibhist a Deas	See North Uist
Vatersay	Vatrsey?	Norse	water island	Wattersay	Bhatarsaigh	fathers' island, priest island, glove island, wavy island

=== Inner Hebrides ===
There are various examples of earlier names for Inner Hebridean islands that were Gaelic, but these names have since been completely replaced. For example, Adomnán records Sainea, Elena, Ommon and Oideacha in the Inner Hebrides. These names presumably passed out of usage in the Norse era, and the locations of the islands they refer to are not clear. As an example of the complexity: Rona may originally have had a Celtic name, then later a similar-sounding Norse name, and then still later a name that was essentially Gaelic again, but with a Norse "øy" or "ey" ending. (See Rona, below.)

Island	Derivation	Language	Meaning	Munro (1549)	Modern Gaelic name	Alternative Derivations
Canna	Cana	Gaelic	porpoise island	Kannay	Eilean Chanaigh	possibly Old Gaelic cana, "wolf-whelp", or Norse kneøy, "knee island"
Coll	Colosus	Pre-Celtic			Colla	possibly Gaelic coll – a hazel
Colonsay	Kolbein's + ey	Norse	Kolbein's island	Colnansay	Colbhasa	possibly Norse for "Columba's island"
Danna	Daney	Norse	Dane island		Danna	Unknown
Easdale				Eisdcalfe	Eilean Èisdeal	Eas is "waterfall" in Gaelic and dale is the Norse for "valley". However the combination seems inappropriate for this small island. Also known as Ellenabeich – "island of the birches"
Eigg	Eag	Gaelic	a notch	Egga	Eige	Also called Eilean Nimban More – "island of the powerful women" until the 16th century.
Eilean Bàn		Gaelic	white isle	Naban	Eilean Bàn	
Eilean dà Mhèinn		Gaelic				
Eilean Donan		Gaelic	island of Donnán		Eilean Donnain	
Eilean Shona		Gaelic + Norse	sea island		Eilean Seòna	Adomnán records the pre-Norse Gaelic name of Airthrago – the foreshore isle".
Eilean Tioram		Gaelic	dry island			
Eriska	Erik's + ey	Norse	Erik's island		Aoraisge	
Erraid	Arthràigh?	Gaelic	foreshore island	Erray	Eilean Earraid	
Gigha	Guðey	Norse	"good island" or "God island"	Gigay	Giogha	Various including the Norse Gjáey – "island of the geo" or "cleft", or "Gydha's isle".
Gometra	Goðrmaðrey	Norse	"The good-man's island", or "God-man's island"		Gòmastra	"Godmund's island".
Iona	Hí	Gaelic	Possibly "yew-place"	Colmkill	Ì Chaluim Chille	Numerous. Adomnán uses Ioua insula which became "Iona" through misreading.
Islay		Pre-Celtic		Ila	Ìle	Various – see above
Isle of Ewe	Eo	English + Gaelic	isle of yew	Ellan Ew		possibly Gaelic eubh, "echo"
Jura	Djúrey	Norse	deer island	Duray	Diùra	Norse: Jurøy – "udder island"
Kerrera	Kjarbarey	Norse	Kjarbar's island		Cearrara	Norse: ciarrøy – "brushwood island" or "copse island"
Lismore	Lios Mòr	Gaelic	big garden/enclosure	Lismoir	Lios Mòr	
Luing		Gaelic	ship island	Lunge	An t-Eilean Luinn	Norse: lyng – heather island or pre-Celtic
Lunga	Langrey	Norse	longship isle	Lungay	Lunga	Gaelic long is also "ship"
Muck	Eilean nam Muc	Gaelic	isle of pigs	Swynes Ile	Eilean nam Muc	Eilean nam Muc-mhara- "whale island". John of Fordun recorded it as Helantmok – "isle of swine".
Mull	Malaios	Pre-Celtic		Mull	Muile	Recorded by Ptolemy as Malaios possibly meaning "lofty isle". In Norse times it became Mýl.
Oronsay	Ørfirisey	Norse	ebb island	Ornansay	Orasaigh	Norse: "Oran's island"
Raasay	Raasey	Norse	roe deer island	Raarsay	Ratharsair	Rossøy – "horse island"
Rona	Hrauney or Ròney	Norse or Gaelic/Norse	"rough island" or "seal island"	Ronay	Rònaigh	
Rum		Pre-Celtic		Ronin	Rùm	Various including Norse rõm-øy for "wide island" or Gaelic ì-dhruim – "isle of the ridge"
Sanday	Sandey	Norse	sandy island		Sandaigh	
Scalpay	Skalprey	Norse	scallop island	Scalpay	Sgalpaigh	Norse: "ship island"
Seil	Sal?	Probably pre-Celtic	"stream"	Seill	Saoil	Gaelic: sealg – "hunting island"
Shuna	Unknown	Norse	Possibly "sea island"	Seunay	Siuna	Gaelic sidhean – "fairy hill"
Skye	Scitis	Pre-Celtic?	Possibly "winged isle"	Skye	An t-Eilean Sgitheanach	Numerous – see above
Soay	So-ey	Norse	sheep island	Soa Urettil	Sòdhaigh	
Tanera Mor	Hafrarey	From Old Norse: hafr, he-goat	Hawrarymoir(?)	Tannara Mòr	Brythonic: Thanaros, the thunder god, island of the haven	
Tiree	Tìr + Eth, Ethica	Gaelic + unknown	Unknown		Tiriodh	Norse: Tirvist of unknown meaning and numerous Gaelic versions, some with a possible meaning of "land of corn"
Ulva	Ulfey	Norse	wolf island		Ulbha	Ulfr's island

=== Uninhabited islands ===
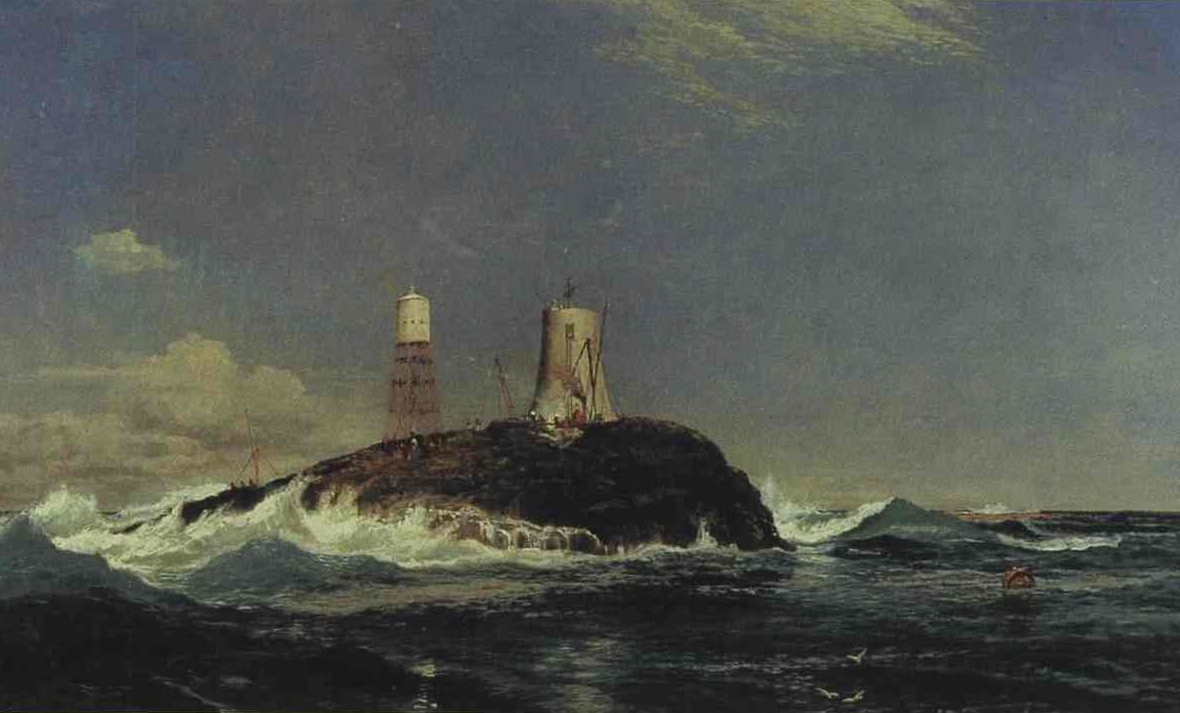
Dhu Heartach Lighthouse, During Construction by Sam Bough (1822–1878)

The names of uninhabited islands follow the same general patterns as the inhabited islands. (See the list, below, of the ten largest islands in the Hebrides and their outliers.)

The etymology of the name "St Kilda", a small archipelago west of the Outer Hebrides, and the name of its main island, "Hirta," is very complex. No saint is known by the name of Kilda, so various other theories have been proposed for the word's origin, which dates from the late 16th century. Haswell-Smith (2004) notes that the full name "St Kilda" first appears on a Dutch map dated 1666, and that it may derive from the Norse phrase sunt kelda ("sweet wellwater") or from a mistaken Dutch assumption that the spring Tobar Childa was dedicated to a saint. (Tobar Childa is a tautological placename, consisting of the Gaelic and Norse words for well, i.e., "well well"). Similarly unclear is the origin of the Gaelic for "Hirta", Hiort, Hirt, or Irt a name for the island that long pre-dates the name "St Kilda". Watson (1926) suggests that it may derive from the Old Irish word hirt ("death"), possibly a reference to the often lethally dangerous surrounding sea. Maclean (1977) notes that an Icelandic saga about an early 13th-century voyage to Ireland refers to "the islands of Hirtir", which means "stags" in Norse, and suggests that the outline of the island of Hirta resembles the shape of a stag, speculating that therefore the name "Hirta" may be a reference to the island's shape.

The etymology of the names of small islands may be no less complex and elusive. In relation to Dubh Artach, Robert Louis Stevenson believed that "black and dismal" was one translation of the name, noting that "as usual, in Gaelic, it is not the only one."

Island	Derivation	Language	Meaning	Munro (1549)	Alternatives
Ceann Ear	Ceann Ear	Gaelic	east headland		
Hirta	Hirt	Possibly Old Irish	death	Hirta	Numerous – see above
Mingulay	Miklaey	Norse	big island	Megaly	"Main hill island". Murray (1973) states that the name "appropriately means Bird Island".
Pabbay	Papaey	Norse	priest island	Pabay	
Ronay		Norse	rough island		
Sandray	Sandray	Norse	sand island	Sanderay	beach island
Scarba		Norse	cormorant island	Skarbay	Skarpey, sharp or infertile island
Scarp	Skarpoe	Norse	"barren" or "stony"	Scarpe	
Taransay		Norse	Taran's island	Tarandsay	Haraldsey, Harold's island
Wiay	Búey	Norse	From bú, a settlement		Possibly "house island"

== History ==
=== Prehistory ===
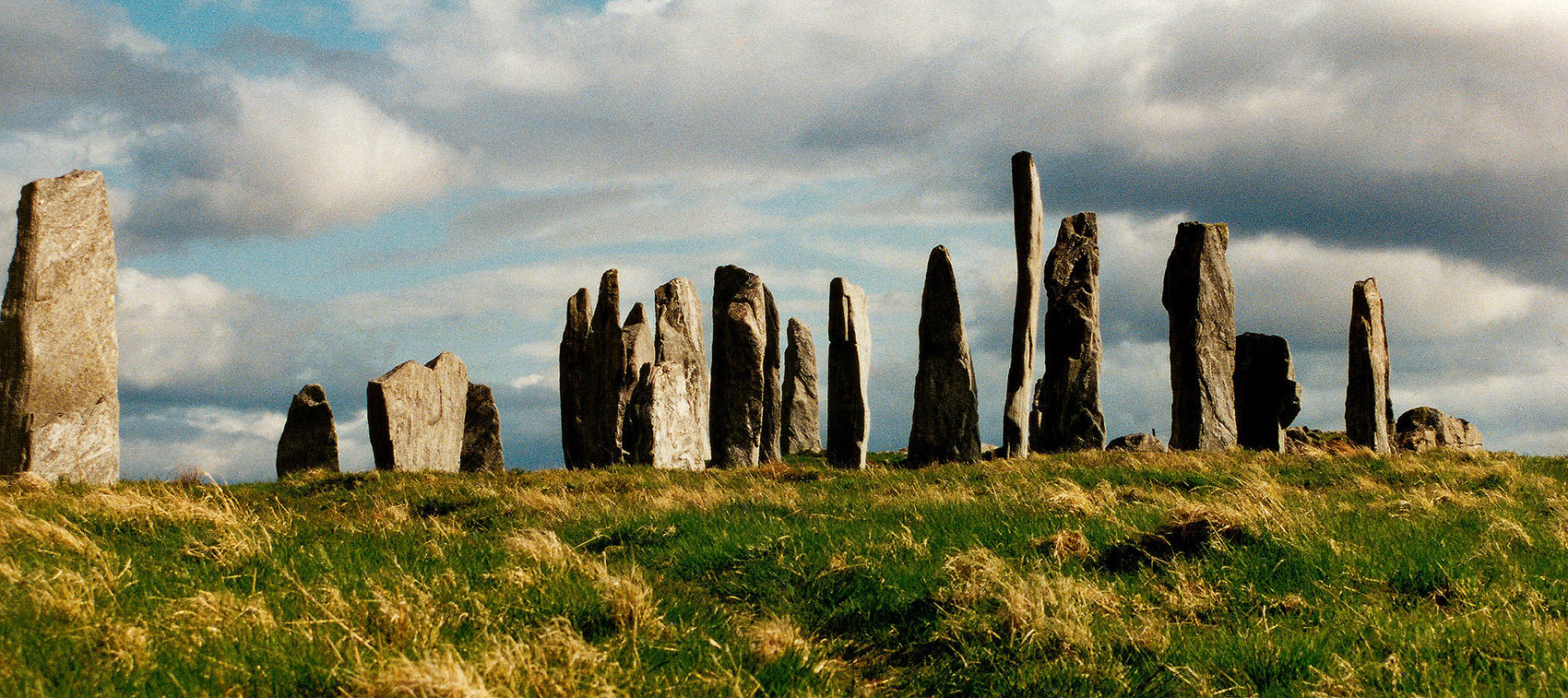
Callanish stone circle

The Hebrides were settled during the Mesolithic era around 6500 BC or earlier, after the climatic conditions improved enough to sustain human settlement. Occupation at a site on Rùm is dated to 8590 ±95 uncorrected radiocarbon years BP, which is amongst the oldest evidence of occupation in Scotland. There are many examples of structures from the Neolithic period, the finest example being the standing stones at Callanish, dating to the 3rd millennium BC. Cladh Hallan, a Bronze Age settlement on South Uist is the only site in the UK where prehistoric mummies have been found.

=== Celtic era ===
In 55 BC, the Greek historian Diodorus Siculus wrote that there was an island called Hyperborea (which means "beyond the North Wind"), where a round temple stood from which the moon appeared only a little distance above the earth every 19 years. This may have been a reference to the stone circle at Callanish.

A traveller called Demetrius of Tarsus related to Plutarch the tale of an expedition to the west coast of Scotland in or shortly before 83 AD. He stated it was a gloomy journey amongst uninhabited islands, but he had visited one which was the retreat of holy men. He mentioned neither the druids nor the name of the island.

The first written records of native life begin in the 6th century AD, when the founding of the kingdom of Dál Riata took place. This encompassed roughly what is now Argyll and Bute and Lochaber in Scotland and County Antrim in Ireland. The figure of Columba looms large in any history of Dál Riata, and his founding of a monastery on Iona ensured that the kingdom would be of great importance in the spread of Christianity in northern Britain. However, Iona was far from unique. Lismore in the territory of the Cenél Loairn, was sufficiently important for the death of its abbots to be recorded with some frequency and many smaller sites, such as on Eigg, Hinba, and Tiree, are known from the annals.

North of Dál Riata, the Inner and Outer Hebrides were nominally under Pictish control, although the historical record is sparse. Hunter (2000) states that in relation to King Bridei I of the Picts in the sixth century: "As for Shetland, Orkney, Skye and the Western Isles, their inhabitants, most of whom appear to have been Pictish in culture and speech at this time, are likely to have regarded Bridei as a fairly distant presence."

From the late sixth to the late eighth century, the Papar, monks of Irish and Scottish origin, established eremitic communities throughout the Hebrides. They brought with them improved manuring practices that enriched and deepened local soils to support the cultivation of barley and oats.

=== Norse control ===
The Kingdom of the Isles about the year 1100

Viking raids began on Scottish shores towards the end of the 8th century, and the Hebrides came under Norse control and settlement during the ensuing decades, especially following the success of Harald Fairhair at the Battle of Hafrsfjord in 872. In the Western Isles Ketill Flatnose may have been the dominant figure of the mid 9th century, by which time he had amassed a substantial island realm and made a variety of alliances with other Norse leaders. These princelings nominally owed allegiance to the Norwegian crown, although in practice the latter's control was fairly limited. Norse control of the Hebrides was formalised in 1098 when Edgar of Scotland formally signed the islands over to Magnus III of Norway. The Scottish acceptance of Magnus III as King of the Isles came after the Norwegian king had conquered Orkney, the Hebrides and the Isle of Man in a swift campaign earlier the same year, directed against the local Norwegian leaders of the various island petty kingdoms. By capturing the islands Magnus imposed a more direct royal control, although at a price. His skald Bjorn Cripplehand recorded that in Lewis "fire played high in the heaven" as "flame spouted from the houses" and that in the Uists "the king dyed his sword red in blood". (Note: Thompson (1968) provides a more literal translation: "Fire played in the fig-trees of Liodhus; it mounted up to heaven. Far and wide the people were driven to flight. The fire gushed out of the houses".)

The Hebrides were now part of the Kingdom of the Isles, whose rulers were themselves vassals of the Kings of Norway. This situation lasted until the partitioning of the Western Isles in 1156, at which time the Outer Hebrides remained under Norwegian control while the Inner Hebrides broke out under Somerled, the Norse-Gael kinsman of the Manx royal house.

Following the ill-fated 1263 expedition of Haakon IV of Norway, the Outer Hebrides and the Isle of Man were yielded to the Kingdom of Scotland as a result of the 1266 Treaty of Perth. Although their contribution to the islands can still be found in personal and place names, the archaeological record of the Norse period is very limited. The best known find is the Lewis chessmen, which date from the mid 12th century.

=== Scottish control ===
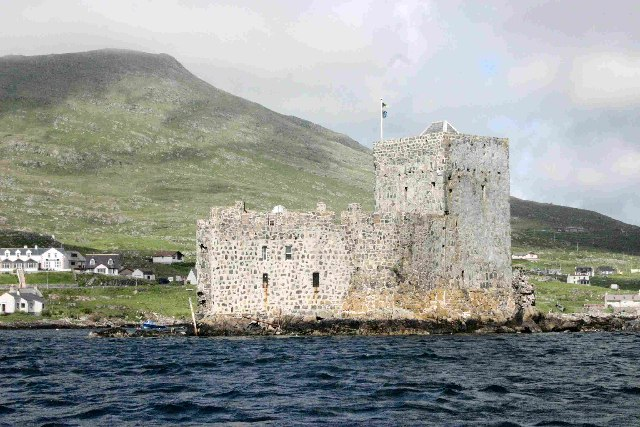
Kisimul Castle, the ancient seat of Clan MacNeil, Castlebay, Barra

As the Norse era drew to a close, the Norse-speaking princes were gradually replaced by Gaelic-speaking clan chiefs including the MacLeods of Lewis and Harris, Clan Donald and MacNeil of Barra. (Note: The transitional relationships between Norse and Gaelic-speaking rulers are complex. The Gall-Ghàidhels who dominated much of the Irish Sea region and western Scotland at this time were of joint Gaelic and Scandinavian origin. When Somerled wrested the southern Inner Hebrides from Godred the Black in 1156, this was the beginnings of a break with nominal Norse rule in the Hebrides. Godred remained the ruler of Mann and the Outer Hebrides, but two years later Somerled's invasion of the former caused him to flee to Norway. Norse control was further weakened in the ensuring century, but the Hebrides were not formally ceded by Norway until 1266. The transitions from one language to another are also complex. For example, many Scandinavian sources from this period of time typically refer to individuals as having a Scandinavian first name and a Gaelic by-name.) This transition did little to relieve the islands of internecine strife although by the early 14th century the MacDonald Lords of the Isles, based on Islay, were in theory these chiefs' feudal superiors and managed to exert some control.

The Lords of the Isles ruled the Inner Hebrides as well as part of the Western Highlands as subjects of the King of Scots until John MacDonald, fourth Lord of the Isles, squandered the family's powerful position. A rebellion by his nephew, Alexander of Lochalsh provoked an exasperated James IV to forfeit the family's lands in 1493.

In 1598, King James VI authorised some "Gentleman Adventurers" from Fife to civilise the "most barbarous Isle of Lewis". Initially successful, the colonists were driven out by local forces commanded by Murdoch and Neil MacLeod, who based their forces on Bearasaigh in Loch Ròg. The colonists tried again in 1605 with the same result, but a third attempt in 1607 was more successful and in due course Stornoway became a Burgh of Barony. By this time, Lewis was held by the Mackenzies of Kintail (later the Earls of Seaforth), who pursued a more enlightened approach, investing in fishing in particular. The Seaforths' royalist inclinations led to Lewis becoming garrisoned during the Wars of the Three Kingdoms by Cromwell's troops, who destroyed the old castle in Stornoway.

=== Early British era ===
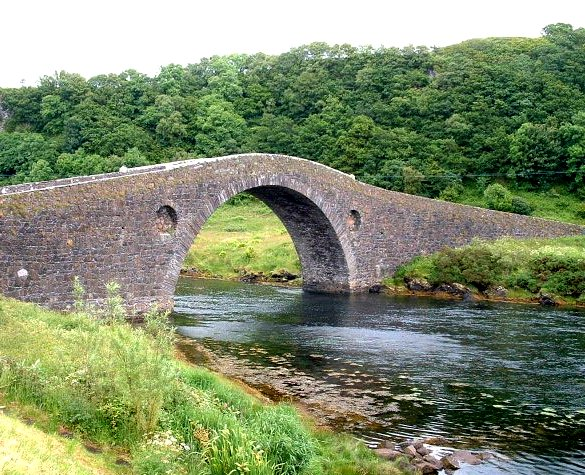
Clachan Bridge between the mainland of Great Britain and Seil, also known as the "Bridge across the Atlantic", was built in 1792.

With the implementation of the Treaty of Union in 1707, the Hebrides became part of the new Kingdom of Great Britain, but the clans' loyalties to a distant monarch were not strong. A considerable number of islesmen "came out" in support of the Jacobite Earl of Mar in the 1715 and again in the 1745 rising including Macleod of Dunvegan and MacLea of Lismore. The aftermath of the decisive Battle of Culloden, which effectively ended Jacobite hopes of a Stuart restoration, was widely felt. The British government's strategy was to estrange the clan chiefs from their kinsmen and turn their descendants into English-speaking landlords whose main concern was the revenues their estates brought rather than the welfare of those who lived on them. This may have brought peace to the islands, but over the following century the clan system was broken up and islands of the Hebrides became a series of landed estates.

The early 19th century was a time of improvement and population growth. Roads and quays were built; the slate industry became a significant employer on Easdale and surrounding islands; and the construction of the Crinan and Caledonian canals and other engineering works such as Clachan Bridge improved transport and access. However, in the mid-19th century, the inhabitants of many parts of the Hebrides were devastated by the Clearances, which destroyed communities throughout the Highlands and Islands as the human populations were evicted and replaced with sheep farms. The position was exacerbated by the failure of the islands' kelp industry that thrived from the 18th century until the end of the Napoleonic Wars in 1815 and large scale emigration became endemic.

As Iain Mac Fhearchair, a Gaelic poet from South Uist, wrote for his countrymen who were obliged to leave the Hebrides in the late 18th century, emigration was the only alternative to "sinking into slavery" as the Gaels had been unfairly dispossessed by rapacious landlords. In the 1880s, the "Battle of the Braes" involved a demonstration against unfair land regulation and eviction, stimulating the calling of the Napier Commission. Disturbances continued until the passing of the 1886 Crofters' Act.

== Language ==
Geographic distribution of people with skills in Scottish Gaelic

The residents of the Hebrides have spoken a variety of different languages during the long period of human occupation.

It is assumed that Pictish must once have predominated in the northern Inner Hebrides and Outer Hebrides. The Scottish Gaelic language arrived from Ireland due to the growing influence of the kingdom of Dál Riata from the 6th century AD onwards, and became the dominant language of the southern Hebrides at that time. For a few centuries, the military might of the Gall-Ghàidheil meant that Old Norse was prevalent in the Hebrides. North of Ardnamurchan, the place names that existed prior to the 9th century have been all but obliterated. The Old Norse name for the Hebrides during the Viking occupation was Suðreyjar, which means "Southern Isles"; in contrast to the Norðreyjar, or "Northern Isles" of Orkney and Shetland.

South of Ardnamurchan, Gaelic place names are more common, and after the 13th century, Gaelic became the main language of the entire Hebridean archipelago. Due to Scots and English being favoured in government and the educational system, the Hebrides have been in a state of diglossia since at least the 17th century. The Highland Clearances of the 19th century accelerated the language shift away from Scottish Gaelic, as did increased migration and the continuing lower status of Gaelic speakers. Nevertheless, as late as the end of the 19th century, there were significant populations of monolingual Gaelic speakers, and the Hebrides still contain the highest percentages of Gaelic speakers in Scotland. This is especially true of the Outer Hebrides, where a slim majority speak the language. The Scottish Gaelic college, Sabhal Mòr Ostaig, is based on Skye and Islay.

Ironically, given the status of the Western Isles as the last Gaelic-speaking stronghold in Scotland, the Gaelic language name for the islands – Innse Gall – means "isles of the foreigners"; from the time when they were under Norse colonisation.

== Modern economy ==
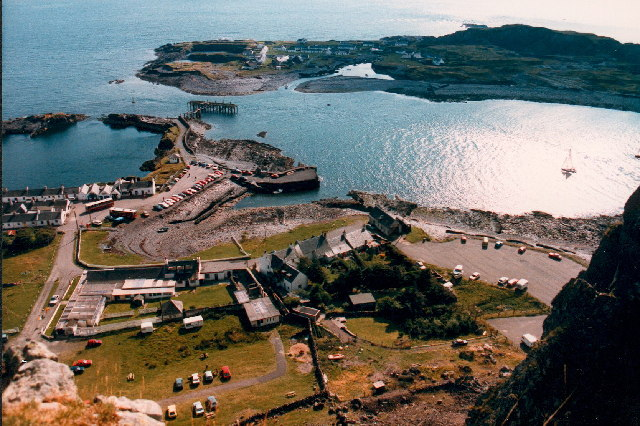
Sea-filled slate quarries on Seil (foreground) and Easdale in the Slate Islands

For those who remained, new economic opportunities emerged through the export of cattle, commercial fishing and tourism. Nonetheless, emigration and military service became the choice of many and the archipelago's populations continued to dwindle throughout the late 19th century and for much of the 20th century. Lengthy periods of continuous occupation notwithstanding, many of the smaller islands were abandoned.

There were, however, continuing gradual economic improvements, among the most visible of which was the replacement of the traditional thatched blackhouse with accommodation of a more modern design and with the assistance of Highlands and Islands Enterprise many of the islands' populations have begun to increase after decades of decline. The discovery of substantial deposits of North Sea oil in 1965 and the renewables sector have contributed to a degree of economic stability in recent decades. For example, the Arnish yard has had a chequered history but has been a significant employer in both the oil and renewables industries.

The widespread immigration of mainlanders, particularly non-Gaelic speakers, has been a subject of controversy.

Agriculture practised by crofters remained popular in the 21st century in the Hebrides; crofters own a small property but often share a large common grazing area. Various types of funding are available to crofters to help supplement their incomes, including the "Basic Payment Scheme, the suckler beef support scheme, the upland sheep support scheme and the Less Favoured Area support scheme". One reliable source discussed the Crofting Agricultural Grant Scheme (CAGS) in March 2020:

the scheme "pays up to £25,000 per claim in any two-year period, covering 80% of investment costs for those who are under 41 and have had their croft less than five years. Older, more established crofters can get 60% grants".

== Media and the arts ==
=== Music ===
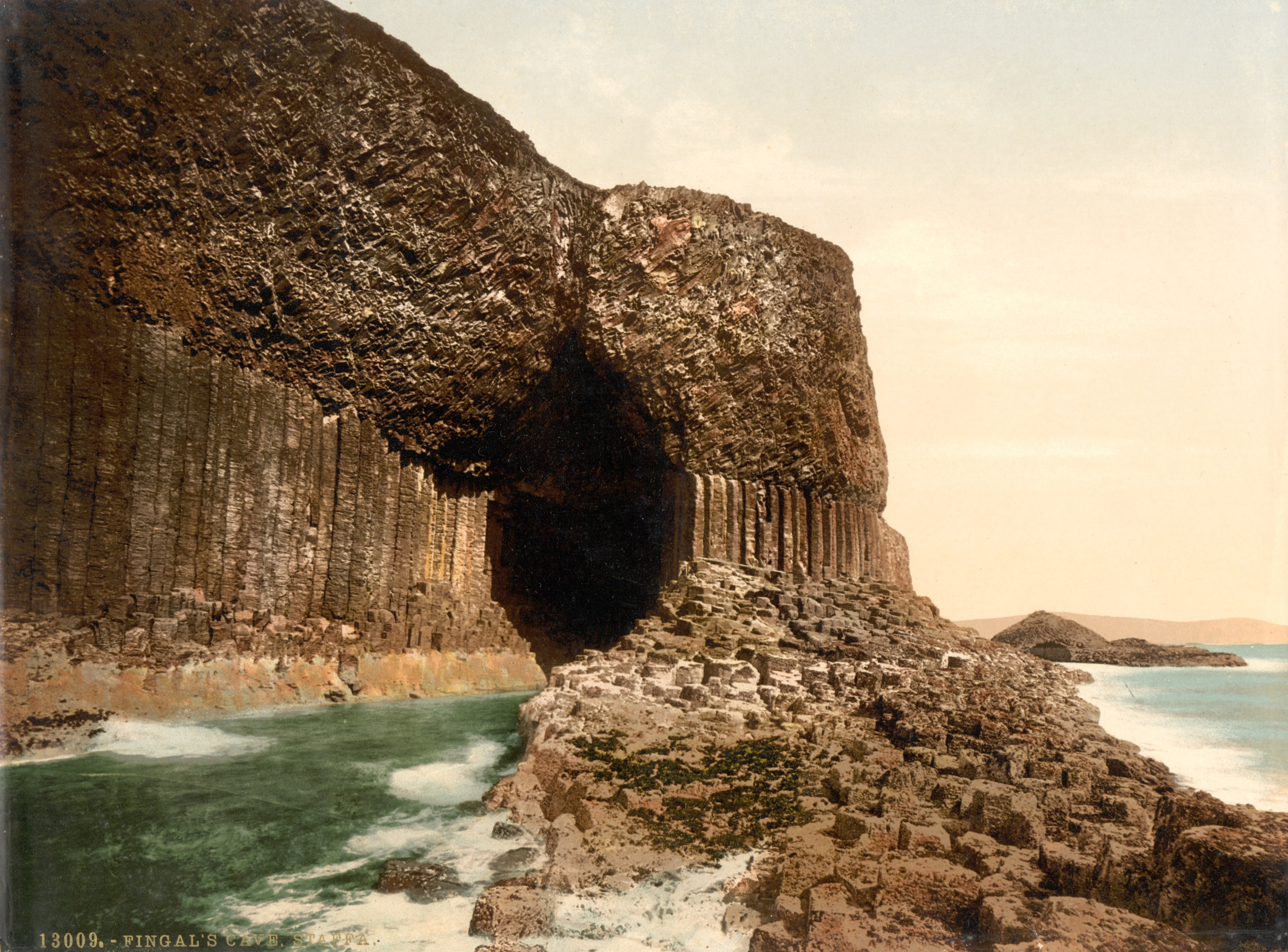
Entrance to Fingal's Cave, Staffa

Many contemporary Gaelic musicians have roots in the Hebrides, including vocalist and multi-instrumentalist Julie Fowlis (North Uist), Catherine-Ann MacPhee (Barra), Gillebrìde MacMillan (South Uist), Kathleen MacInnes of the band Capercaillie (South Uist), and Ishbel MacAskill (Lewis). All of these singers have composed their own music in Scottish Gaelic, with much of their repertoire stemming from Hebridean vocal traditions, such as puirt à beul ("mouth music", similar to Irish lilting) and òrain luaidh (waulking songs). This tradition includes many songs composed by little-known or anonymous poets, well-before the 1800s, such as "Fear a' bhàta", "Ailein duinn", "Hùg air a' bhonaid mhòir" and "Alasdair mhic Cholla Ghasda". Several of Runrig's songs are inspired by the archipelago; Calum and Ruaraidh Dòmhnallach were raised on North Uist and Donnie Munro on Skye.

=== Literature ===
The Gaelic poet Alasdair mac Mhaighstir Alasdair spent much of his life in the Hebrides and often referred to them in his poetry, including in An Airce and Birlinn Chlann Raghnaill. The best known Gaelic poet of her era, Màiri Mhòr nan Òran (Mary MacPherson, 1821–98), embodied the spirit of the land agitation of the 1870s and 1880s. This, and her powerful evocation of the Hebrides—she was from Skye—has made her among the most enduring Gaelic poets. Allan MacDonald (1859–1905), who spent his adult life on Eriskay and South Uist, composed hymns and verse in honour of the Blessed Virgin, the Christ Child, and the Eucharist. In his secular poetry, MacDonald praised the beauty of Eriskay and its people. In his verse drama, Parlamaid nan Cailleach (The Old Wives' Parliament), he lampooned the gossiping of his female parishioners and local marriage customs.

In the 20th century, Murdo Macfarlane of Lewis wrote Cànan nan Gàidheal, a well-known poem about the Gaelic revival in the Outer Hebrides. Sorley MacLean, the most respected 20th-century Gaelic writer, was born and raised on Raasay, where he set his best known poem, Hallaig, about the devastating effect of the Highland Clearances. Aonghas Phàdraig Caimbeul, raised on South Uist and described by MacLean as "one of the few really significant living poets in Scotland, writing in any language" (West Highland Free Press, October 1992) wrote the Scottish Gaelic-language novel An Oidhche Mus do Sheòl Sinn which was voted in the Top Ten of the 100 Best-Ever Books from Scotland.

Virginia Woolf's To The Lighthouse is set on the Isle of Skye, part of the Inner Hebrides.

=== Film ===
- The area around the Inaccessible Pinnacle of Sgurr Dearg of Skye provided the setting for the Scottish Gaelic feature film Seachd: The Inaccessible Pinnacle (2006). The script was written by the actor, novelist, and poet Aonghas Phàdraig Chaimbeul, who also starred in the movie.
- An Drochaid, an hour-long documentary in Scottish Gaelic, was made for BBC Alba documenting the battle to remove tolls from the Skye bridge.
- The 1973 film, The Wicker Man, is set on the fictional Hebridean island of Summerisle. The filming itself took place in Galloway and Skye
- I Know Where I'm Going! (1945) is set on and was filmed on locations on Mull and the whirlpool in the Gulf of Corryvreckan.

=== Video games ===
- The 2012 exploration adventure game Dear Esther by developer The Chinese Room is set on an unnamed island in the Hebrides.
- The Hebrides are featured in the 2021 video game Battlefield 2042 as the setting of the multiplayer map Redacted, which was introduced into the game in October 2023.

=== Influence on visitors ===
- J.M. Barrie's Marie Rose contains references to Harris inspired by a holiday visit to Amhuinnsuidhe Castle and he wrote a screenplay for the 1924 film adaptation of Peter Pan whilst on Eilean Shona.
- The Hebrides, also known as Fingal's Cave, is a famous overture composed by Felix Mendelssohn while residing on these islands, while Granville Bantock composed the Hebridean Symphony.
- Enya's song "Ebudæ" from Shepherd Moons is named after the Hebrides (see below).
- The 1973 British horror film The Wicker Man is set on the fictional Hebridean island of Summerisle.
- The 2011 British romantic comedy The Decoy Bride is set on the fictional Hebrides island of Hegg.
- Hebrides Suite is a 4-movement suite composed by Clare Grundman. It is written for concert band and is based on the folk music of the Hebrides Islands.

== Natural history ==
In some respects the Hebrides lack biodiversity in comparison to mainland Britain; for example, there are only half as many mammalian species. However, these islands provide breeding grounds for many important seabird species including the world's largest colony of northern gannets. Avian life includes the corncrake, red-throated diver, rock dove, kittiwake, tystie, Atlantic puffin, goldeneye, golden eagle and white-tailed sea eagle. The latter was re-introduced to Rùm in 1975 and has successfully spread to various neighbouring islands, including Mull. There is a small population of red-billed chough concentrated on the islands of Islay and Colonsay.

Red deer are common on the hills and the grey seal and common seal are present around the coasts of Scotland. Colonies of seals are found on Oronsay and the Treshnish Isles. The rich freshwater streams contain brown trout, Atlantic salmon and water shrew. Offshore, minke whales, orcas, basking sharks, porpoises and dolphins are among the sealife that can be seen.

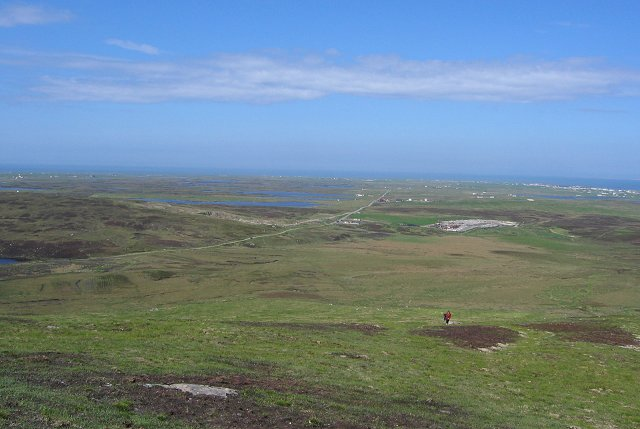
The open landscapes of Benbecula

Heather moor containing ling, bell heather, cross-leaved heath, bog myrtle and fescues is abundant and there is a diversity of Arctic and alpine plants including Alpine pearlwort and mossy cyphal.

Loch Druidibeg on South Uist is a national nature reserve owned and managed by Scottish Natural Heritage. The reserve covers 1,677 hectares across the whole range of local habitats. Over 200 species of flowering plants have been recorded on the reserve, some of which are nationally scarce. South Uist is considered the best place in the UK for the aquatic plant slender naiad, which is a European Protected Species.

Hedgehogs are not native to the Outer Hebrides—they were introduced in the 1970s to reduce garden pests—and their spread poses a threat to the eggs of ground nesting wading birds. In 2003, Scottish Natural Heritage undertook culls of hedgehogs in the area although these were halted in 2007 due to protests. Trapped animals were relocated to the mainland.

== See also ==
- List of islands of Scotland
- Scottish island names
- Geology of Scotland
- Timeline of prehistoric Scotland
- Fauna of Scotland
- New Hebrides
- Languages of Scotland
- Goidelic substrate hypothesis
- Insular Celtic languages
- Canadian Boat-Song
- The Lewis Awakening (Religious Revival)

== References and footnotes ==
=== General references ===
- Ballin Smith, B. and Banks, I. (eds) (2002) In the Shadow of the Brochs, the Iron Age in Scotland. Stroud. Tempus. ISBN 0-7524-2517-X
- Ballin Smith, Beverley; Taylor, Simon; and Williams, Gareth (2007) West over Sea: Studies in Scandinavian Sea-Borne Expansion and Settlement Before 1300. Leiden. Brill.
- Benvie, Neil (2004) Scotland's Wildlife. London. Aurum Press. ISBN 1-85410-978-2
- Buchanan, Margaret (1983) St Kilda: a Photographic Album. W. Blackwood. ISBN 0-85158-162-5
- Buxton, Ben. (1995) Mingulay: An Island and Its People. Edinburgh. Birlinn. ISBN 1-874744-24-6
- Downham, Clare "England and the Irish-Sea Zone in the Eleventh Century" in Gillingham, John (ed) (2004) Anglo-Norman Studies XXVI: Proceedings of the Battle Conference 2003. Woodbridge. Boydell Press. ISBN 1-84383-072-8
- Fraser Darling, Frank; Boyd, J. Morton (1969). The Highlands and Islands. The New Naturalist. London: Collins. First published in 1947 under title: Natural history in the Highlands & Islands; by F. Fraser Darling. First published under the present title 1964.
- Gammeltoft, Peder (2006). "Scandinavian influence on Hebridean island names". In Gammeltoft, Peder; Jorgenson, Bent (eds.). Names through the Looking-Glass. Copenhagen: C.A. Reitzels Forlag. ISBN 8778764726.
- Gammeltoft, Peder (2010) "Shetland and Orkney Island-Names – A Dynamic Group Archived 23 July 2011 at the Wayback Machine". Northern Lights, Northern Words. Selected Papers from the FRLSU Conference, Kirkwall 2009, edited by Robert McColl Millar.
- "Occasional Paper No 10: Statistics for Inhabited Islands". (28 November 2003) General Register Office for Scotland. Edinburgh. Retrieved 22 January 2011.
- Gillies, Hugh Cameron (1906) The Place Names of Argyll. London. David Nutt.
- Gregory, Donald (1881) The History of the Western Highlands and Isles of Scotland 1493–1625. Edinburgh. Birlinn. 2008 reprint – originally published by Thomas D. Morrison. ISBN 1-904607-57-8
- Haswell-Smith, Hamish (2004). The Scottish Islands. Edinburgh: Canongate. ISBN 978-1-84195-454-7.
- Hunter, James (2000) Last of the Free: A History of the Highlands and Islands of Scotland. Edinburgh. Mainstream. ISBN 1-84018-376-4
- Keay, J. & Keay, J. (1994) Collins Encyclopaedia of Scotland. London. HarperCollins.
- Lynch, Michael (ed) (2007) Oxford Companion to Scottish History. Oxford University Press. ISBN 978-0-19-923482-0.
- Mac an Tàilleir, Iain (2003) Goireasan Cànain / Language Resources - Tadhail is Ionnsaich : Pàrlamaid na h-Alba. (pdf) Pàrlamaid na h-Alba. Retrieved 26 October 2025.
- Maclean, Charles (1977) Island on the Edge of the World: the Story of St. Kilda. Edinburgh. Canongate ISBN 0-903937-41-7
- Monro, Sir Donald (1549) A Description Of The Western Isles of Scotland. Appin Regiment/Appin Historical Society. Retrieved 3 March 2007. First published in 1774.
- Murray, W. H. (1966) The Hebrides. London. Heinemann.
- Murray, W.H. (1973) The Islands of Western Scotland. London. Eyre Methuen. ISBN 0-413-30380-2
- Omand, Donald (ed.) (2006) The Argyll Book. Edinburgh. Birlinn. ISBN 1-84158-480-0
- Ordnance Survey (2009) "Get-a-map". Retrieved 1–15 August 2009.
- Rotary Club of Stornoway (1995) The Outer Hebrides Handbook and Guide. Machynlleth. Kittiwake. ISBN 0-9511003-5-1
- Slesser, Malcolm (1970) The Island of Skye. Edinburgh. Scottish Mountaineering Club.
- Steel, Tom (1988) The Life and Death of St. Kilda. London. Fontana. ISBN 0-00-637340-2
- Stevenson, Robert Louis (1995) The New Lighthouse on the Dhu Heartach Rock, Argyllshire. California. Silverado Museum. Based on an 1872 manuscript and edited by Swearingen, R.G.
- Thompson, Francis (1968) Harris and Lewis, Outer Hebrides. Newton Abbot. David & Charles. ISBN 0-7153-4260-6
- Watson, W. J. (1994) The Celtic Place-Names of Scotland. Edinburgh. Birlinn. ISBN 1-84158-323-5. First published 1926.
- Woolf, Alex (2007). From Pictland to Alba, 789–1070. The New Edinburgh History of Scotland. Edinburgh: Edinburgh University Press. ISBN 978-0-7486-1234-5.
