= The Skye Boat Song =

19th-century Scottish song

"The Skye Boat Song"
An adaptation for bagpipes played by the Clan Stewart Pipe Band

"The Skye Boat Song" (Roud 3772) is a late 19th-century Scottish song adaptation of a Gaelic song composed in around 1782 by William Ross, entitled Cuachag nan Craobh ("Cuckoo of the Tree"). In the original song, the composer laments to a cuckoo that his unrequited love, Lady Marion Ross, is rejecting him. The 19th century English lyrics instead evoked the journey of Prince Charles Edward Stuart ("Bonnie Prince Charlie") from Benbecula to the Isle of Skye as he evaded capture by government soldiers after his defeat at the Battle of Culloden in 1746.

Sir Harold Boulton, 2nd Baronet composed the new lyrics to Ross's song which had been heard by Anne Campbell MacLeod in the 1870s, and the line "Over the Sea to Skye" is now a cornerstone of the tourism industry on the Isle of Skye.

Alternative lyrics to the tune were written by Robert Louis Stevenson, probably in 1885. After hearing the Jacobite airs sung by a visitor, he judged the lyrics to be "unworthy", and composed a new set of verses "more in harmony with the plaintive tune".

It is often played as a slow lullaby or waltz, and entered into the modern folk canon in the twentieth century with versions by Paul Robeson, Tom Jones, Rod Stewart, Roger Whittaker, Tori Amos, and many others.

== Content ==
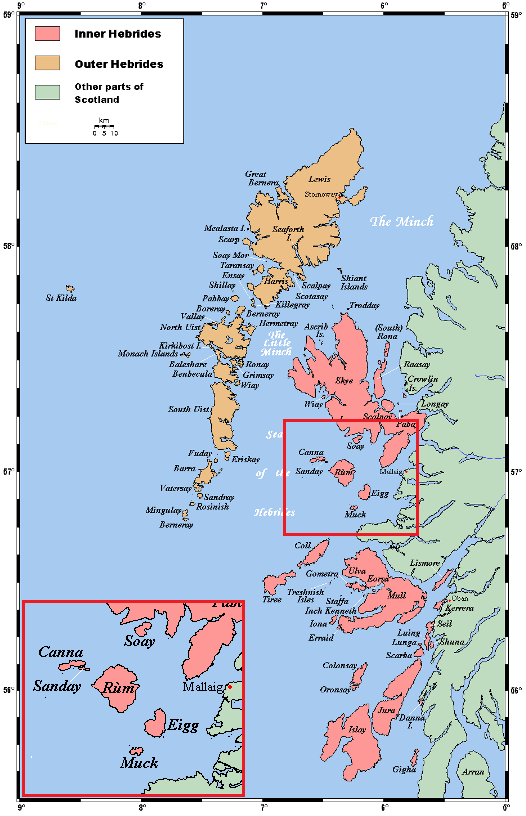
Location of the Small Isles within the Hebrides

The text of the song gives an account of how Bonnie Prince Charlie, disguised as a serving maid, escaped in a small boat after the defeat of his Jacobite rising of 1745, with the aid of Flora MacDonald. The song draws on the motifs of Jacobitism although it was composed nearly a century and a half after the episode it describes. Especially Stevenson's version, which gives the boat's course (Mull was astern, Rum on the port, Eigg on the starboard bow) seems to describe Charles's flight from the mainland, but that is unhistorical. The only time Charles was in Skye was when he left Benbecula in the Outer Hebrides to avoid the increasingly thorough government searches. It is unlikely that a boat from Benbecula would sail south of Rum to travel to Skye.

== Origin ==
The lyrics were written by Sir Harold Boulton, 2nd Baronet, to Ross's song collected in the 1870s by Anne Campbell MacLeod (1855–1921), who became Lady Wilson by marriage to Sir James Wilson, KCSI (1853–1926), in 1888. The song was first published by Boulton and MacLeod, London, in 1884, in Songs of the North, a book that went into at least twenty editions. In later editions, MacLeod's name was dropped and the ascription "Old Highland rowing measure arranged by Malcolm Lawson" was substituted. It was quickly taken up by other compilers, such as Laura Alexandrine Smith's Music of the Waters (published 1888). Lawson was the elder brother of artist Cecil Gordon Lawson.

The song is set in the style of a iorram, a Gaelic rowing song. According to Andrew Kuntz, a collector of folk music lore, MacLeod was on a trip to the isle of Skye and was being rowed over Loch Coruisk (Coire Uisg, the "Cauldron of Waters") when the rowers broke into a Gaelic rowing song "Cuachag nan Craobh" ("The Cuckoo in the Grove"). MacLeod set down what she remembered of the air, with the intention of using it in a book she was to co-author with Boulton, who later added the section with the Jacobite associations. "As a piece of modern romantic literature with traditional links it succeeded perhaps too well, for soon people began 'remembering' they had learned the song in their childhood, and that the words were 'old Gaelic lines'," Andrew Kuntz has observed.

The song was not in any older books of Scottish songs, though it is in most collections like The Fireside Book of Folk Songs. It is often sung as a lullaby, in a slow rocking 6/8 time.

== Recording history and covers ==
It was extremely popular in its day and, from its first recording by Tom Bryce on 29 April 1899, it became a standard among Scottish folk and dance musicians. From the 1960s onwards, it became even more widely known and has remained popular in mainstream music genres.

The song was also used in the British World War II film, Above Us the Waves (1955), with John Mills, James Robertson Justice and John Gregson. The film was based on the attack by British midget submarines (human torpedoes) on the German battleship Tirpitz in a Norwegian fjord.

In 1957, Michael Tippett included the song, titled as "Over the Sea to Skye", in his arrangements of Four Songs from the British Isles for unaccompanied four-part chorus, commissioned by North West German Radio, Bremen, for a festival of European folk song. However, the amateur choir for which they were intended found the songs too difficult, and the first performance took place in July 1958, given by the London Bach Group, conducted by John Minchinton, at Royaumont in France. Tippett's Selected Letters states that he proposed to replace "Over the Sea to Skye" because it was "too strictly held by a publisher here".

Alfred Deller recorded a version for his album Western Wind in 1958, together with Desmond Dupré on guitar and John Sothcott on recorder. It was performed to great acclaim and recorded by artist and social activist Paul Robeson in 1959 and 1960.

Welshman Tom Jones recorded a version, arranged by Lee Lawson and Harold Boulton, on his 1965 debut album Along Came Jones. The same album, released in the U.S. as It's Not Unusual, which included only 12 of the original 16 tracks, gave no attribution for the arrangement but did characterise the song as "Trad.—2:57." Esther & Abi Ofarim recorded the song under the title "Bonnie Boat" for their album Das Neue Esther & Abi Ofarim Album (1966).

=== Doctor Who ===
Patrick Troughton, as the Second Doctor on the British science-fiction television series Doctor Who, played the song repeatedly on his recorder in episode 6, scene 10 of "The Web of Fear" (broadcast 9 March 1968). Sacha Dhawan, as the Master, also played the song on recorder in "The Power of the Doctor" (broadcast 23 October 2022). Ncuti Gatwa, as the Fifteenth Doctor, sang the song to calm himself while standing on a land mine, in episode 3 of series 14, "Boom", broadcast on 18 May 2024.

=== Hits Down Under ===
Among later renditions that became well known were Peter Nelson and The Castaways from New Zealand, who released a version in 1966, as did Larry’s rebels on their debut album “a study in black” in 1967. In Australia, artist Glen Ingram released a version also in 1966. Ingram and the castaways versions were in the Australian hit parade in 1966. A tough garage rock version of the song by a New Guinean band, The Stalemates, was included on the Viking Records compilation The New Guinea Scene in 1969.

=== 1970s ===
Calum Kennedy included a version on Songs of Scotland and Ireland (Beltona 1971), and Rod Stewart recorded two versions of the song with The Atlantic Crossing Drum & Pipe Band during the sessions for Atlantic Crossing between 1974 and 1975. They were given an official release on the deluxe re-release of the album in 2009.

=== After 1980 ===
Roger Whittaker's duet version with Des O'Connor, released in 1986, made the UK top 10; it combined O'Connor's vocals with Whittaker's whistling version, a part of his repertoire since at least the mid-1970s. The track was recorded at London's Holland Park Lansdowne Studios. The cellist Julian Lloyd Webber recorded an instrumental version of the song in 1986 on the album Encore!.

In the 1987 horror film, It's Alive III: Island of the Alive, the main character played by Michael Moriarty sings the song on board a boat with crew members.

The Shadows played an instrumental version of the song on their 1987 album Simply Shadows. Singer Tori Amos covered the song as part of a song trilogy entitled "Etienne Trilogy" on her debut album Y Kant Tori Read (1988). James Galway and The Chieftains recorded an instrumental version (which was used as background music for a Johnnie Walker commercial) in February 1990 at Studios 301, Sydney, Australia, released on the album Over the Sea to Skye – The Celtic Connection. There is also a version on The Corries In Concert / Scottish Love Songs album (track 19). Galway plays the instrumental version on episode 1957 of Sesame Street, originally aired in 1984.

"The Skye Boat Song" can be heard in "Tomorrow Night" by the New Zealand musical theatre duo The Front Lawn on their 1989 album Songs from the Front Lawn.

Stellan Skarsgård's character plays this song on the cello in the 1992 film Wind.

=== 21st century ===
Scottish singer Barbara Dickson recorded the song in 2006, and Marc Gunn included it on his 2013 album Scottish Songs of Drinking & Rebellion.

Bear McCreary adapted the song as the opening titles of the 2014 TV series Outlander, sung by Raya Yarbrough, changing the text of Robert Louis Stevenson's poem "Sing Me a Song of a Lad That Is Gone" (1892) to "Lass" to fit the story. In season 6, the opening main title was sung as an English-language duet by Raya Yarbrough and Griogair Labhruidh, with the lyric returning to “lad”. In the same season, a Gaelic main-title version — with new Gaelic lyrics written and performed by Griogair Labhruidh — was used for the opening credits of episode 605, “Give Me Liberty”. In season 7, the opening is sung by Sinéad O'Connor. In the final season, the opening is sung by Annie Lennox.

It can also be heard as background instrumental music in several episodes of the American serial killer television series Dexter. Peter Hollens recorded an a capella cover of the song for the 2018 album Legendary Folk songs.

George Donaldson of Celtic Thunder sang it in the 2015 show "Heritage" (arr. Phil Coulter) and on the CD and DVD of the same name. Celtic Thunder Limited. USA Sony Music Entertainment.

The Choral Scholars of University College Dublin recorded an arrangement by their artistic director Desmond Earley for their 2015 album Invisible Stars: Choral Works of Ireland and Scotland.

The song was played by pipers as the coffin of Her Late Majesty Queen Elizabeth II travelled up the Long Walk to Windsor Castle on 19 September 2022.

The song reappears in Doctor Who in the episode "The Power of the Doctor" in October 2022, played by the Master on the recorder, which in-universe is supposed to be the same recorder that the Second Doctor used.

The song reappears again in Doctor Who in the episode "Boom" in May 2024, sung by the Fifteenth Doctor.

The song appears as background music in Black Flags on Season 1, episode 2, "II," at 47 minutes, 10 seconds.

== Lyrics and melody ==
=== Original lyrics ===
[Chorus:]
Speed, bonnie boat, like a bird on the wing,
Onward! the sailors cry;
Carry the lad that's born to be king
Over the sea to Skye.

1. Loud the winds howl, loud the waves roar,
Thunderclaps rend the air;
Baffled, our foes stand by the shore,
Follow they will not dare.

[Chorus]

2. Many's the lad, fought on that day
Well the claymore did wield;
When the night came, silently lay
Dead on Culloden's field.

[Chorus]

3. Though the waves leap, soft shall ye sleep,
Ocean's a royal bed.
Rocked in the deep, Flora will keep
Watch by your weary head.

[Chorus]

4. Burned are their homes, exile and death
Scatter the loyal men;
Yet ere the sword cool in the sheath
Charlie will come again.

=== Stevenson's poem ===
Robert Louis Stevenson's 1892 poem, which has been sung to the tune, has the following text:

[Chorus:]
Sing me a song of a lad that is gone,
Say, could that lad be I?
Merry of soul he sailed on a day
Over the sea to Skye.

1. Mull was astern, Rum on the port,
Eigg on the starboard bow;
Glory of youth glowed in his soul;
Where is that glory now?

[Chorus]

2. Give me again all that was there,
Give me the sun that shone!
Give me the eyes, give me the soul,
Give me the lad that's gone!

[Chorus]

3. Billow and breeze, islands and seas,
Mountains of rain and sun,
All that was good, all that was fair,
All that was me is gone.

=== Other version ===
There has also been a hymn adaptation of the tune, known as "Spirit of God Unseen as the Wind"; some of the lyrics vary.
