= Kathleen MacInnes =

Scottish singer

Kathleen MacInnes / Caitlin NicAonghais
- Born: Kathleen NicAonghais; 30 December 1969 (age 56)
- Origin: South Uist, Outer Hebrides, Scotland
- Genres: Celtic, folk
- Occupations: Singer, actress
- Years active: 1992–present
- Labels: Greentrax Recordings

Kathleen MacInnes, or Caitlin NicAonghais in Scottish Gaelic, (born 30 December 1969) is a Scottish singer, who performs primarily in Scottish Gaelic. She is a native of South Uist, Outer Hebrides, Scotland, and lives in Glasgow with her partner and three sons. In 2010, she appeared on the soundtrack to the Ridley Scott film Robin Hood.

== Discography ==
=== Solo albums ===
- Òg-Mhadainn Shamhraidh (Summer Dawn) (2006)
- Cille Bhrìde (Kilbride) (2012)

=== Collaborations and guest appearances ===
- Iain MacDonald & Iain MacFarlane – The First Harvest (2002)
- Maggie MacInnes – Òran na Mnà (A Woman's Song) (2006)
- Julie Fowlis – Cuilidh (2007)
- Griogair Labhruidh – Dail-riata (2007)
- Margaret Stewart - Togaidh mi mo Sheòlta (2007)
- Deoch 'n' Dorus – The Curer (2008)
- Blair Douglas – Stay Strong (Bithibh Laidir / Rester Fort) (2008)
- Flying Fiddles – Flying Fiddles (2009)
- Marc Streitenfeld – Robin Hood (Soundtrack) (2010)
- Seudan – Seudan (2011)
- Salsa Celtica – The Tall Islands (2014)
- Niteworks – Maraiche (2015)
- Trail West – Rescattermastered (2016)

== Filmography ==
=== Film ===
- An Ceasnachadh: The Interrogation of a Highland Lass (2000)
- Seachd: The Inaccessible Pinnacle (2007)

=== Television ===
- Speaking our Language (1992–1996)
- Machair (1992–1998)
- Bannan / The Ties that Bind (2014)
- Gaol @ Gael (2014)

== Awards ==
- Scots Trad Music Awards: Gaelic Singer of the Year (2006)
