= Cinderella (2015 soundtrack) =

2015 film score by Patrick Doyle

Cinderella (Original Motion Picture Soundtrack)

Film score by Patrick Doyle
- Released: March 10, 2015
- Recorded: Air Lyndhurst Studios (London)
- Genres: Orchestral; melody
- Length: 84:57
- Label: Walt Disney
- Producer: Kenneth Branagh

Patrick Doyle chronology
Jack Ryan: Shadow Recruit (2014)	Cinderella (2015)	A United Kingdom (2016)

Cinderella: Original Motion Picture Soundtrack is the soundtrack album to the 2015 film Cinderella. A live-action film adaptation of Walt Disney's 1950 animated film based on the folk tale, is directed by Kenneth Branagh and featured musical score composed by Patrick Doyle, Branagh's frequent collaborator. The score was released by Walt Disney Records on March 10, 2015 and debuted at No. 60 on the Billboard 200, selling 8,000 copies in its first week.

== Development ==
On June 7, 2013, news confirmed that Patrick Doyle would score the film. Branagh claiming about Doyle's music being vitally important, had further stated, "The tone we were trying to achieve was playful and joyful, but also emotional without being manipulative. Patrick found a beautiful yet robust tune that could be orchestrated so that it could offer lots of moods. It had simplicity, joy, and added a sense of fun. And, of course, his trademark: romantic."

The score offered various moods for the characters and sequences. For Cinderella and Prince's main theme "La Valse de L’Amour", Doyle had written four additional waltzes and three polkas for the ball, lending a 19th-century musical flavour that complements the setting, design and costumes according to that time period. One of Cinderella's key themes, where Ella's mother sings early in the film, is derived from a 17th-century tune lending on English folk music. He added choral notes for few key sequences, including transformation of Cinderella’s dress, her isolation in the attic, which Doyle stated it as an "ethereal" and "melancholic touch", and for the wicked stepmother, which was "slightly more mysterious" and "otherwordly sense". From the 2006 film adaptation of the Shakespearean play As You Like It, Doyle's composition of the Shakespearean sonnet "It Was A Lover And His Lass" was set to the film, which was sung by Sophie McShera, who played Drisella. Doyle comically stated that "it would be the ultimate disaster to have an appalling singer sing those immortal words".

In addition to the score, three tracks "A Dream Is a Wish Your Heart Makes" and "Bibbidi-Bobbidi-Boo" (songs adapted from the 1950 film) were featured in the end credits, sung by Lily James and Helena Bonham Carter, in addition to an original song "Strong" written by Doyle, Branagh and Tommy Danvers and recorded by Sonna Rele of MoTown. Doyle said that the tune was "based on all the themes used in the film". Doyle recorded the film's score with the London Symphony Orchestra conducted by James Shearman at the Air Lyndhurst Studios in London. According to him, "the executives of Disney wanted the score to have a classic feel to it, a timeless quality", where he wanted to strive for and honor the tradition.

== Track listing ==
No.	Title	Writer(s)	Performer(s)	Length
1.	"A Golden Childhood"			3:56
2.	"The Great Secret"			3:01
3.	"A New Family"			2:15
4.	"Life and Laughter"			1:34
5.	"The First Branch"			2:11
6.	"Nice and Airy"			1:53
7.	"Orphaned"			3:46
8.	"The Stag"			4:56
9.	"Rich Beyond Reason"			1:43
10.	"Fairy Godmother"			2:47
11.	"Pumpkins and Mice"			4:32
12.	"You Shall Go"			3:02
13.	"Valse Royale"			2:06
14.	"Who Is She?"			3:20
15.	"La Valse De L'amour"			2:34
16.	"La Valse Champagne"			1:35
17.	"La Polka Militaire"			1:47
18.	"La Polka De Paris"			1:22
19.	"A Secret Garden"			2:48
20.	"La Polka De Minuit"			2:02
21.	"Choose That One"			1:16
22.	"Pumpkin Pursuit"			2:28
23.	"The Slipper"			1:00
24.	"Shattered Dreams"			4:10
25.	"Searching the Kingdom"			2:51
26.	"Ella and Kit"			2:11
27.	"Courage and Kindness"			4:38
28.	"Strong"	Patrick Doyle, Kenneth Branagh and Tommy Danvers	Sonna Rele	3:14
29.	"A Dream Is a Wish Your Heart Makes"	Al Hoffman, Mack David, and Jerry Livingston	Lily James	2:00
30.	"Bibbidi-Bobbidi-Boo"	Al Hoffman, Mack David, and Jerry Livingston	Helena Bonham Carter	2:28
31.	"Strong (Instrumental Version)"			3:14
32.	"A Dream Is a Wish Your Heart Makes (Instrumental Version)"			2:01
33.	"Bibbidi-Bobbidi-Boo (Instrumental Version)"			1:21
Total length:				84:57

== Charts ==
=== Weekly charts ===
Chart (2015)	Peak position
UK Soundtrack Albums (OCC)	11
US Billboard 200	60
US Soundtrack Albums (Billboard)	32

=== Year-end charts ===
Chart (2015)	Peak position
US Billboard 200	156
