= Rise of the Planet of the Apes (soundtrack) =

Rise of the Planet of the Apes (Original Motion Picture Soundtrack)

Film score by Patrick Doyle
- Released: August 9, 2011
- Recorded: 2010–2011
- Studios: Newman Scoring Stage, Twentieth Century Fox Studios
- Genre: Film score
- Length: 49:38
- Labels: Varèse Sarabande; Fox Music
- Producer: Patrick Doyle

Patrick Doyle chronology
Sarajevo (2011)	Rise of the Planet of the Apes (2011)	Brave (2012)

Rise of the Planet of the Apes (Original Motion Picture Soundtrack) is the score album to the 2011 film Rise of the Planet of the Apes, a reboot of the Planet of the Apes film franchise. The film's original score was composed by Patrick Doyle, and was released by Varèse Sarabande and Fox Music on August 9, 2011.

== Development ==
The score for the film was written by Patrick Doyle and performed by the Hollywood Studio Symphony conducted by James Shearman. On being compared to the musical works of Jerry Goldsmith and Danny Elfman, who scored the previous instalment, and its impact on the tonal and primitive quality, Doyle opined that the musical approach would be fresh. The main concern was to have the music help progress the plot in the scenes without dialogue, for instance, conveying the emotions of Caesar's relationships with Will and Charles. To turn the score into a "driving force that keeps audiences paying attention," Doyle employed an African-American chorus and focused on percussion and "low and deep" orchestra sounds. Doyle collaborated closely with the sound department to make the music complement the sound effects, including writing a recurring theme based on their recording of a chimpanzee.

== Reception ==
James Southall of Movie Wave wrote "While this is undoubtedly the most mainstream of all the Apes scores, it's also arguably the only one which attempts to give a real emotional arc to the apes themselves. The album isn't consistently outstanding – a few tracks I haven't mentioned in my commentary above don't really add too much – but is quite a thrill ride, proving Patrick Doyle's more than got the chops to play at the top table even in modern action movies." Sean Wilson of Mfiles wrote, "It's immensely satisfying to note that even on a major Hollywood score such as this, Doyle's voice can still shine through. It's a testament to his skills as a composer, but director Rupert Wyatt must also be applauded for allowing the composer to maintain his musical personality, even under the vast weight of expectation. Doyle has always been one of the most sensitive composers in the business, and by balancing the score's modern trappings with the sense of beauty for which he is renowned, ensures Rise of the Planet of the Apes is yet another winning score for 2011. Much like Thor, it demands repeat listening but rewards those willing to go the distance."

Filmtracks.com wrote, "Some listeners will find too much of Rise of the Planet of the Apes to be similarly generic in its catering to blockbuster norms, but listen more carefully to Doyle's complexities and you will be rewarded. The thematic development, while very strong, is not quite pleasing enough in its obvious placements to give this score the highest rating. It stands as a strong sibling to Thor, however, and proves that the humble and humorous Scot is certainly more than capable of handling these kinds of assignments." James Christopher Monger of AllMusic wrote, "Doyle, who comes from the Hanz Zimmer and Harry Gregson-Williams school of big and bold and percussive action cues, allows little space for the reboot to breathe, yet his themes are consistently thrilling, rarely devolving into the kind of generic, tuneless smorgasbord of kettle drums and dissonant keyboard strings that so often pass for 21st century summer blockbuster fare." Peter Debruge of Variety said that Doyle's "insistent score clearly sympathizes with the pic's climactic ape uprising". David Edelstein of Vulture wrote Doyle's "typically stupendous score sweeps aside the absurdities"

== Track listing ==
No.	Title	Length
1.	"The Beginning"	2:48
2.	"Bright Eyes Escapes"	3:38
3.	"Lofty Swing"	1:36
4.	"Stealing The 112"	1:52
5.	"Muir Woods"	1:20
6.	"Off You Go"	2:17
7.	"Who Am I?"	2:21
8.	"Caesar Protects Charles"	3:58
9.	"The Primate Facility"	2:45
10.	"Dodge Hoses Caesar"	1:40
11.	"Rocket Attacks Caesar"	1:24
12.	"Visiting Time"	2:17
13.	"‘Caesing' The Knife"	2:04
14.	"Buck Is Released"	1:52
15.	"Charles Slips Away"	1:16
16.	"Cookies"	1:14
17.	"Inhaling The Virus"	2:45
18.	"Caesar's Stand"	4:23
19.	"Gen-Sys Freedom"	4:57
20.	"Zoo Breakout"	2:41
21.	"Golden Gate Bridge"	5:21
22.	"The Apes Attack"	2:10
23.	"Caesar and Buck"	1:58
24.	"Caesar's Home"	2:40
Total length:		61:17

== Personnel ==
Credits adapted from CD liner notes.

- Producer – Maggie Rodford, Patrick Doyle
- Programming – Rupert Cross, Roger Suen, Sam Bohn
- Recording – Alan Meyerson, Joel Iwataki, Kevin Globerman, Vincent Cirilli, Tim Lauber
- Score editing – Chris Benstead, Jeanette Surga, Joseph Bonn
- Mastering – Andrew Walter
- Mixing – Patrick Spain, Joel Iwataki
- Musical assistance – Jerome Pangelinan
- Music supervisor – Patrick Houlihan
- Music contractor – Gina Zimmitti
- Vocals contractor – Jasper Randall
- Music preparation – 'Note That Score'
- Executive producer – Robert Townson

Instruments

- Bass – Bruce Morgenthaler, Drew Dembowski, Ed Meares, Frances Liu Wu, Oscar Hidalgo, Sue Ranney
- Bassoon – Ken Munday, Rose Corrigan
- Cello – Tony Cooke, Cecilia Tsan, Dennis Karmazyn, Giovanna Clayton, Steve Erdody, Tim Landauer, Tim Loo, Trevor Handy
- Clarinet – Don Foster, Ralph Williams, Stuart Clark
- Flute – Heather Clark, Steve Kujala, Pedro Eustache
- Oboe – Leslie Reed, Phil Ayling
- Percussion – Bob Zimmitti, Alex Acuña, Luis Conte, Mike Fisher
- Piano – Randy Kerber
- Trombone – Alex Iles, Bill Reichenbach, Steve Holtman
- Trumpet – Jon Lewis, Marissa Benedict, Rick Baptist
- Tuba – Doug Tornquist
- Viola – Andrew Duckles, Brian Dembow, David Walther, Keith Greene, Matt Funes, Shawn Mann, Thomas Diener, Vicky Miskolczy
- Violin – Alan Grunfeld, Alyssa Park, Barbra Porter, Charlie Bisharat, Darius Campo, Eun Mee Ahn, Helen Nightingale, Henry Gronnier, Jackie Brand, Josefina Vergara, Julie Rogers, Kathleen Sloan, Katia Popov, Lily Ho Chen, Natalie Leggett, Neel Hammond, Becky Bunnell, Richard Altenbach, Sarah Thornblade, Tiffany Yi Hu, Bruce Dukov
- Vocals (African choir) – Alvin Chea, Ayo Adeyemi, Baye Diouf, Terence Chaplin, Carmen Twillie, Darryl Phinnessee, Dethie Diouf, Greg Clark, Ibrahima Ba, Jim Gilstrap, Joel Virgel, Jules Green, Louis King, Marc Antonio Pritchett, Oren Waters, Rocky Dawuni, Thiane Diouf, Will Wheaton
- Woodwind – Pedro Eustache

Orchestra

- Orchestra – The Hollywood Studio Symphony
- Orchestration – James Shearman, Patrick Doyle, Bruce Fowler
- Concertmaster – Belinda Broughton
- Conductor – James Shearman
- Stage engineer – Denis St. Amand

Management

- Business affairs – Tom Cavanaugh
- Executive in charge of music – Robert Kraft
- Music production supervisor – Rebecca Morellato
- Stage manager – Greg Dennen, Tom Steel
