= Jack Ryan: Shadow Recruit (soundtrack) =

Jack Ryan: Shadow Recruit – Music From the Motion Picture

Film score by Patrick Doyle
- Released: January 14, 2014
- Recorded: 2013
- Studios: Abbey Road; Air Lyndhurst Hall; Air-Edel
- Genre: Film score
- Length: 73:12
- Label: Varèse Sarabande

Patrick Doyle chronology
Brave (2012)	Jack Ryan: Shadow Recruit (2014)	Cinderella (2015)

Jack Ryan: Shadow Recruit – Music from the Motion Picture is the soundtrack to the 2014 action thriller film Jack Ryan: Shadow Recruit based on the character Jack Ryan created by author Tom Clancy; the fifth film in the Jack Ryan series and the second reboot. Directed by Kenneth Branagh, the film stars Chris Pine as the titular character alongside Kevin Costner and Keira Knightley. The film's music is composed by Patrick Doyle and released digitally by Varèse Sarabande on January 14, 2014, and on physical formats on February 4.

== Background ==
Branagh's regular collaborator Patrick Doyle composed music for Jack Ryan: Shadow Recruit. Doyle eventually visited the film's sets in late-2012 to get the feel for the characterizations and the scope. He recalled that Branagh wanted a piece of music for the specific scene which he had the theme the following day. He wrote the main theme at his recording studio while watching the edit. The score was written for around seven months, unlike Doyle's usual projects which would take up to 3–4 months. James Shearman conducted the London Symphony Orchestra.

== Reception ==
Filmtracks.com wrote "the score for Jack Ryan: Shadow Recruit is disappointingly anonymous despite housing those five to ten minutes of solid highlights." Pete Simons of Synchrotones assigned three-and-a-half out of five and wrote "this is a great example of a composer adapting to modern cinema, without losing his own voice". Daniel Schweiger of Assignment X wrote "Patrick Doyle terrifically reboots himself along with Tom Clancy's action-hero analyst". Peter Hartlaub of San Francisco Chronicle wrote "Patrick Doyle's pulse-quickening score is a huge asset".

== Track listing ==
Jack Ryan: Shadow Recruit – Music from the Motion Picture track listing
No.	Title	Length
1.	"Flying Over Afghanistan"	2:43
2.	"The United Nations"	2:42
3.	"Shadow Accounts"	2:54
4.	"The Window Reflection"	1:51
5.	"Rooftop Call"	1:52
6.	"Second Great Depression"	3:19
7.	"Faith of Our Fathers"	4:00
8.	"Cherevin Meets Ryan"	2:11
9.	"Plan in a Van"	1:51
10.	"The Activation"	2:19
11.	"Aleksandr"	1:54
12.	"The Engagement"	2:24
13.	"Stealing the Data"	7:59
14.	"Get Out"	4:19
15.	"Moscow Car Chase"	4:15
16.	"The Lightbulb"	4:37
17.	"Unravelling the Data"	4:37
18.	"CIA Recruitment"	1:41
19.	"Chopper to NYC"	1:40
20.	"Bike Chase"	3:47
21.	"Jack And Aleksandr"	3:15
22.	"Picking This Life"	1:04
23.	"Ryan, Mr. President"	3:28
24.	"Shadow Recruit"	2:30
Total length:		73:12

== Personnel ==
Credits adapted from CD liner notes.

- Music – Patrick Doyle
- Producer – Maggie Rodford, Patrick Doyle
- Orchestra – London Symphony Orchestra
- Orchestration – James Shearman, Patrick Doyle
- Conductor – James Shearman
- Contractor – Evgeny Tugarinov, Rob Fardell
- Piano – John Alley, Patrick Doyle
- Programming – Rupert Cross
- Engineer – Chris Barrett, Fiona Cruickshank, Lawrence Anslow, Roman Turtev
- Recording and mixing – Nick Taylor
- Mastering – Andrew Walter
- Music editor – Chris Benstead
- Score editor – Robin Morrison
- Musical assistance – Laura Nakhla
- Technician – Patrick Jonsson
- Music co-ordinator – Jason Richmond
- Copyist – Colin Rae
- Executive producer – Kenneth Branagh, Robert Townson
