= Uam =

Studio album by Julie Fowlis
- Released: 26 October 2009
- Recorded: 2009
- Genre: Folk; Celtic
- Label: Machair (own label); Shoeshine Records
- Producer: Julie Fowlis; Éamon Doorley

Julie Fowlis chronology
Cuilidh (2007)	Uam (2009)	Live at Perthshire Amber (2011)

Professional ratings
Review scores
Source	Rating
The Guardian	link
The Telegraph	link

Uam is the third music album by Scottish musician Julie Fowlis. It was released on 26 October 2009 in Europe and in March 2010 in Canada and the United States. The album features contributions from Eddi Reader, Phil Cunningham and Sharon Shannon among others. It is the first Fowlis album to contain English lyrics, contributed by Eddi Reader on a bilingual version of folk song Wind And Rain. The title of the album means "From me" in Scottish Gaelic.

== Track listing ==
1. M' fhearann saidhbhir
  - M' fhearann saidhbhir (My land is rich)
  - Nellie Garvey's
  - 'G ioman nan gamhan 's mi muladach
  - Jerry's Pipe Jig
2. Bothan Àirigh am Bràigh Raithneach (A sheiling on the Braes of Rannoch)
3. Wind and Rain
4. Thig am bàta (the boat will come)
5. A Chatrion' Òg (Young Catriona)
6. Hé gràdh, hò gràdh
7. Cò nì mire rium?
  - Cò nì mire rium? (Who will flirt with me?)
  - Trip to Galway
8. A' Chiad Cheum (The First Step)
9. Brògan ùr agam a-nochd
  - Brògan ùr agam a-nochd (I have new shoes tonight)
  - The Cat and The Dog
  - Mu chuachag 's laghach thu (My beloved you are so nice)
10. Rugadh mi 'teis meadhan na mara (Me zo ganet é kreiz er mor / I was born in the midst of the sea)
11. Bodachan cha phòs mi
12. A Mhic Dhùghaill 'ic Ruairidh (Son of Dougal, son of Ruairidh)
13. Hò bha mi, hé bha mi (Hò I was, hè I was)
