= Brave (soundtrack) =

Brave (Original Soundtrack)

Film score by Patrick Doyle
- Released: June 19, 2012
- Recorded: 2011–2012
- Studios: Air Studios, London
- Genres: Celtic; film score
- Length: 65:32
- Label: Walt Disney
- Producers: Julie Fowlis; Jim Sutherland; Éamon Doorley; Mumford & Sons; Maggie Rodford

Patrick Doyle chronology
Rise of the Planet of the Apes (2011)	Brave (2012)	Jack Ryan: Shadow Recruit (2014)

Professional ratings
Review scores
Source	Rating
AllMusic	4/5 stars
Empire	3/5 stars
Film Score Reviews	4/5 stars
Filmtracks	4/5 stars

Brave (Original Soundtrack) is the soundtrack album to the 2012 Disney-Pixar film of the same name composed by Patrick Doyle and performed by the London Symphony Orchestra. The soundtrack features Doyle's musical score and features two original songs performed by Scottish singer Julie Fowlis (written by Alex Mandel and Mark Andrews, produced by Jim Sutherland), and one original song performed by Birdy and Mumford & Sons. Walt Disney Records released the soundtrack on both CD album and digital download on June 19, 2012.

Brave was the first Disney film to feature music lyrics in Scottish Gaelic. The lullaby duet between the characters Merida and Queen Elinor entitled "A Mhaighdean Bhan Uasal (Noble Maiden Fair)" (music by Patrick Doyle, lyrics by Patrick Neil Doyle) appears on three occasions in different variations within the fabric of the score, and uniquely includes Gaelic vocals by Emma Thompson and Peigi Barker. Doyle also composed for the film, "Song of Mor'du" (lyrics by Patrick Doyle and Steve Purcell) sung by Billy Connolly, Scott Davies, Patrick Doyle, Gordon Neville, Alex Norton and Carey Wilson. In this drinking song, Doyle and Purcell utilise a rich variety of words in the Scots language.

Doyle's original music for Brave was used in the official trailers for the film, which subsequently featured prominently in the film's score. The trailers also included a Scottish Gaelic song called "Tha Mo Ghaol Air Àird A' Chuain" sung by Julie Fowlis, taken from her album Mar a tha mo chridhe.

Brave is the first Pixar film not to be scored by Randy Newman, Thomas Newman, or Michael Giacchino. The film along with The Good Dinosaur, Onward, Soul, Luca, Turning Red, Inside Out 2, Elio and Hoppers are currently the only Pixar films that are not scored by the three recurring composers. Additionally, with the London Symphony Orchestra performing, this is the first Pixar film not to be scored in Los Angeles.

== Track listing ==
All tracks are written by Patrick Doyle, except "Touch the Sky" (music by Alex Mandel, lyrics by Mandel and Mark Andrews), "Into the Open Air" (music and lyrics by Mandel), and "Learn Me Right" (music and lyrics by Mumford & Sons).

No.	Title	Performer(s)	Length
1.	"Touch the Sky"	Julie Fowlis	2:31
2.	"Into the Open Air"	Julie Fowlis	2:41
3.	"Learn Me Right"	Birdy, Mumford & Sons	3:46
4.	"Fate and Destiny"		4:17
5.	"The Games"		1:53
6.	"I Am Merida"		2:23
7.	"Remember to Smile"		2:17
8.	"Merida Rides Away"		4:07
9.	"The Witch's Cottage"		4:26
10.	"Song of Mor'du"	Billy Connolly & Cast	2:17
11.	"Through the Castle"		4:34
12.	"Legends Are Lessons"		4:06
13.	"Show Us the Way"		3:46
14.	"Mum Goes Wild"		3:25
15.	"In Her Heart"		2:36
16.	"Noble Maiden Fair (A Mhaighdean Bhan Uasal)"	Emma Thompson & Peigi Barker	2:36
17.	"Not Now!"		3:34
18.	"Get the Key"		3:15
19.	"We've Both Changed"		5:30
20.	"Merida's Home"		1:32
Total length:			65:32

== Charts ==
Brave debuted as the highest-charting Pixar soundtrack at US Billboard since Cars in 2006. Ratatouille never placed, WALL-E debuted at No. 127 and Cars 2 at No. 153. The soundtracks to Up and Toy Story 3 were only released digitally, instead of being given a traditional CD release, until 2011.

Chart (2012)	Peak position
Spanish Albums Chart	33
Canadian Albums Chart	70
U.S. Billboard Soundtracks	2
U.S. Billboard Top 200	33
U.S. Billboard Digital Albums	13
