= Griogair Labhruidh =

Scottish Gaelic singer-songwriter

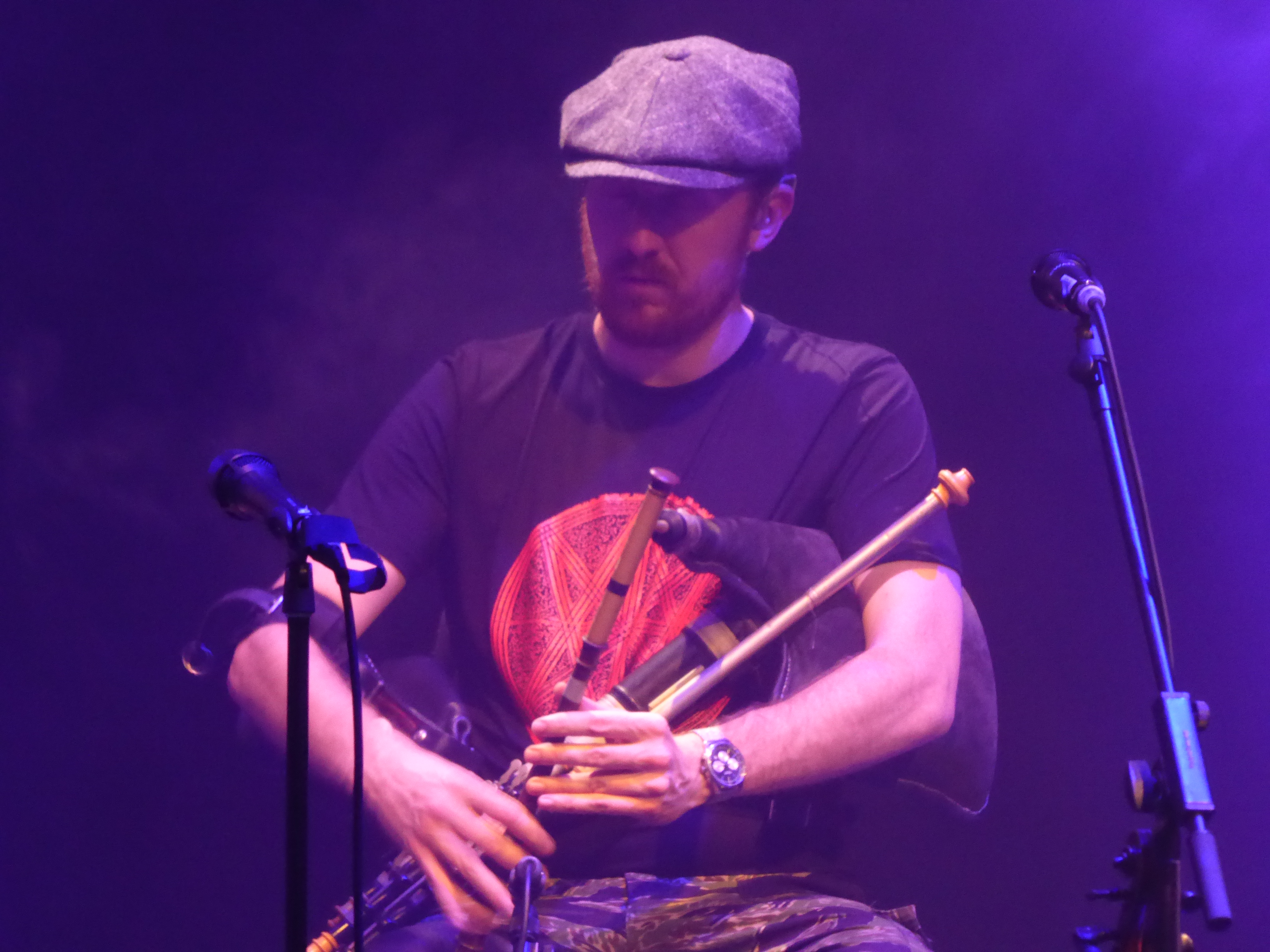
Labruidh playing with Afro Celt Sound System, October 2016

Griogair Labhruidh (born 24 October 1982) is a Scottish Gaelic singer/songwriter, multi-instrumentalist and recording artist from Gartocharn with strong roots in the Gaelic tradition of Ballachulish in the Scottish Highlands. After many years recording the Gaelic traditions of his local area, Gaelic became his dominant language and he is one of the few musicians who can speak and perform in a mainland Gaelic dialect, rather than the standard Hebridean Gaelic. Well-versed in the ceòl mòr piping tradition of his native district, Labhruidh is a member of the Afro-Celt Sound System and has also produced Gaelic music in non-traditional genres, such as hip-hop. In 2014, Labhruidh, who sings in a sean-nós style, became the main vocalist for the Gaelic supergroup Dàimh. He was Gaelic Singer of the Year at the MG Alba Trad Music Awards of 2015. He contributed a chapter to the book Dhá Leagan Déag: Léargais Nua ar an Sean-Nós.

Labhruidh was a Ph.D. candidate at the National University of Ireland; his dissertation "challenges the influences of cultural colonisation upon the Gaelic singing tradition of Scotland". In addition, he runs a croft in the Ballachulish area of the Scottish Highlands.

Labhruidh has featured extensively in the soundtrack of the television series Outlander, collaborating with series composer Bear McCreary to provide vocals and lyrics for both traditional Gaelic songs and original compositions.

== Contributions to Outlander ==
Working closely with composer Bear McCreary, Labhruidh contributed Gaelic vocals and original lyrics across four seasons of Outlander. In Season 2 he performed the Jacobite song Moch sa Mhadainn (by Alasdair mac Mhaighstir Alasdair); McCreary described his voice as “a powerful reminder of the Scottish spirit.” He also provided Gaelic vocals on the soundtrack track “Je Suis Prest.” His vocals returned in Season 5 to underscore Jamie Fraser’s fiery-cross oath-taking sequence.

In Season 6, Labhruidh recorded Gaelic versions of "The Skye Boat Song" and wrote the Gaelic lyrics used for the arrangement on the official soundtrack. He also performed on the English-language main-title theme as a duet with Raya Yarbrough. The Gaelic version—with lyrics by Labhruidh—was used for the opening credits of Episode 605 (“Give Me Liberty”).

In Season 7, he arranged and performed the end-credits song Tha mi Sgìth ’n Fhògar Seo (attributed to Iain mac Mhurchaidh) for Episode 8; the recording was released on the official soundtrack, which also features Sinéad O'Connor on the season’s main-title theme. A “Fife and Drum” version of the main title, performed as a duet by Raya Yarbrough and Labhruidh, was released as a bonus track on the Season 7 soundtrack.
