= Julie Fowlis =

Scottish singer (born 1979)

Julie Fowlis FRSE
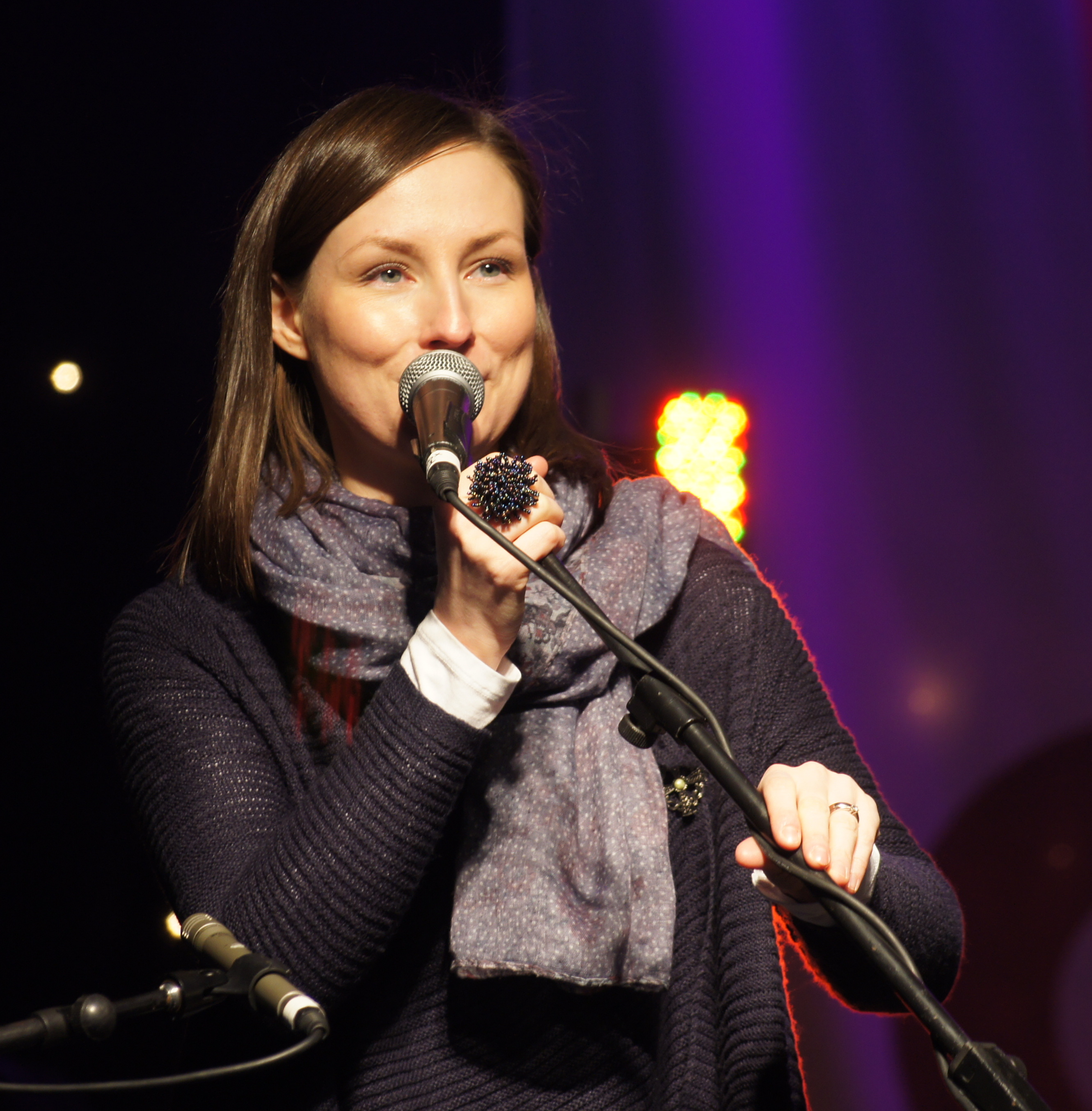
- Julie Fowlis at Edinburgh's Hogmanay 2011

Background information
- Born: 20 June 1979 (age 47); North Uist, Outer Hebrides, Scotland
- Genres: Celtic; Folk
- Occupations: Musician; broadcaster
- Instruments: Vocals; whistle; Great Highland bagpipe; Scottish smallpipes; flute; oboe; cor anglais; accordion; melodeon; shruti box
- Years active: 2005–present
- Labels: Macmeanmna; Shoeshine; Machair
- Website: www.juliefowlis.com

Julie Fowlis FRSE (born 20 June 1979) is a Scottish folk singer and multi-instrumentalist who sings primarily in Scottish Gaelic.

== Early life ==
Fowlis was born and grew up on North Uist, an island in the Outer Hebrides, in a Gaelic-speaking community. Her mother was a Gaelic-speaking islander from a family of fishermen and crofters which originated on the island of Heisgeir, while her father was originally from Pitlochry on mainland Scotland. Her parents ran a hotel for many years on North Uist. She moved with her parents to Ross-shire on the mainland when she was 15 years old after her father took a new job. The family lived in Strathpeffer and Fowlis finished her secondary education at Dingwall Academy. She attended the University of Strathclyde in Glasgow and studied the oboe and the English horn. She graduated in 2000 with a BA in Applied Music. After university, Fowlis attended the Gaelic language college Sabhal Mòr Ostaig on the Isle of Skye to improve her Gaelic and formally study traditional Scottish music. After completing her studies on Skye she returned to Ross-shire. From 2001-2004, she was music development officer at the Gaelic language and culture organisation Fèis Rois in Dingwall.

== Career ==
Fowlis had been involved in singing, piping and dancing since she was a child. She began her professional music career as a member of the Scottish sextet Dòchas which included Shetland fiddle player Jenna Reid. The group formed while four of its members were students at the Royal Scottish Academy of Music and Drama and Fowlis was a student at nearby University of Strathclyde. Billed as "a young and dynamic all-female band playing traditional music from the Highlands and Islands of Scotland and Ireland," the band released its first album in 2002. The group was nominated for the Best Up and Coming Artist/Band award at the inaugural Scots Trad Music Awards in 2003 and won the award in 2004. Fowlis herself was nominated for the Gaelic Singer of the Year award the same year.

While continuing with Dòchas and releasing the band's second album An Darna Umhail in 2005, Fowlis began to strike out on her own. Also in 2005 she released her first solo album Mar a Tha Mo Chridhe (As My Heart Is). The album was produced by Iain MacDonald and Fowlis and instantly gained her worldwide acclaim. Fowlis' future husband Éamonn Doorley played bouzouki on seven of the tracks. She was also accompanied by Kris Drever, Ross Martin of the Gaelic super group" Dàimh, John Doyle, Iain MacDonald, Muireann Nic Amhlaoibh of Danú, and many other performers prominent in the traditional Irish and Scottish music scenes. The album was remastered and re-released in 2012.

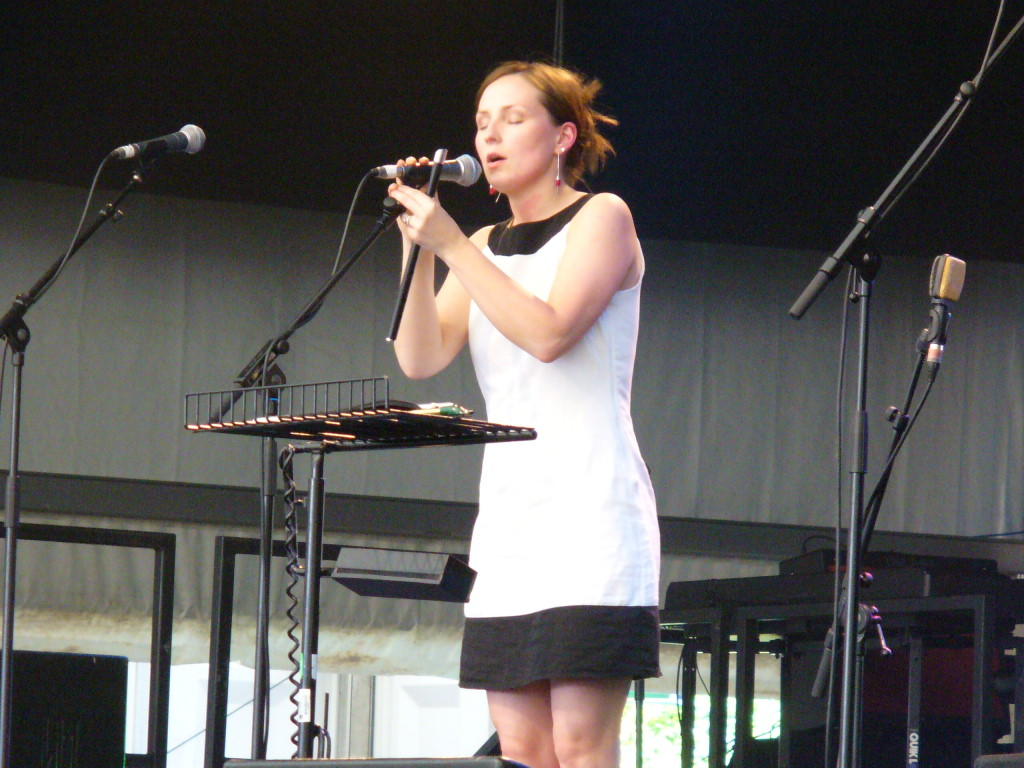
Julie Fowlis performing live, 2007

Her second solo album Cuilidh was released in March 2007, becoming a worldwide top-seller in the Traditional and World Music charts. Her album is a collection of songs from her native North Uist. Doorley again played bouzouki on nearly all the tracks and co-produced the album with Fowlis. She is also accompanied by John Doyle, Ross Martin, John McCusker, Iain MacDonald, Kathleen MacInnes, and many others.

Fowlis won the Horizon award at the 2006 BBC Radio 2 Folk Awards, won Folk Singer of The Year at the 2008 awards and was nominated for the Folk Singer of the Year award at the 2007 awards. She appeared on Later With Jools Holland on BBC Two on 25 May 2007, and performed Hùg air Bhonaid Mhòir on the show. Notable fans of Fowlis include Björk, Ricky Gervais and Radiohead's Phil Selway.

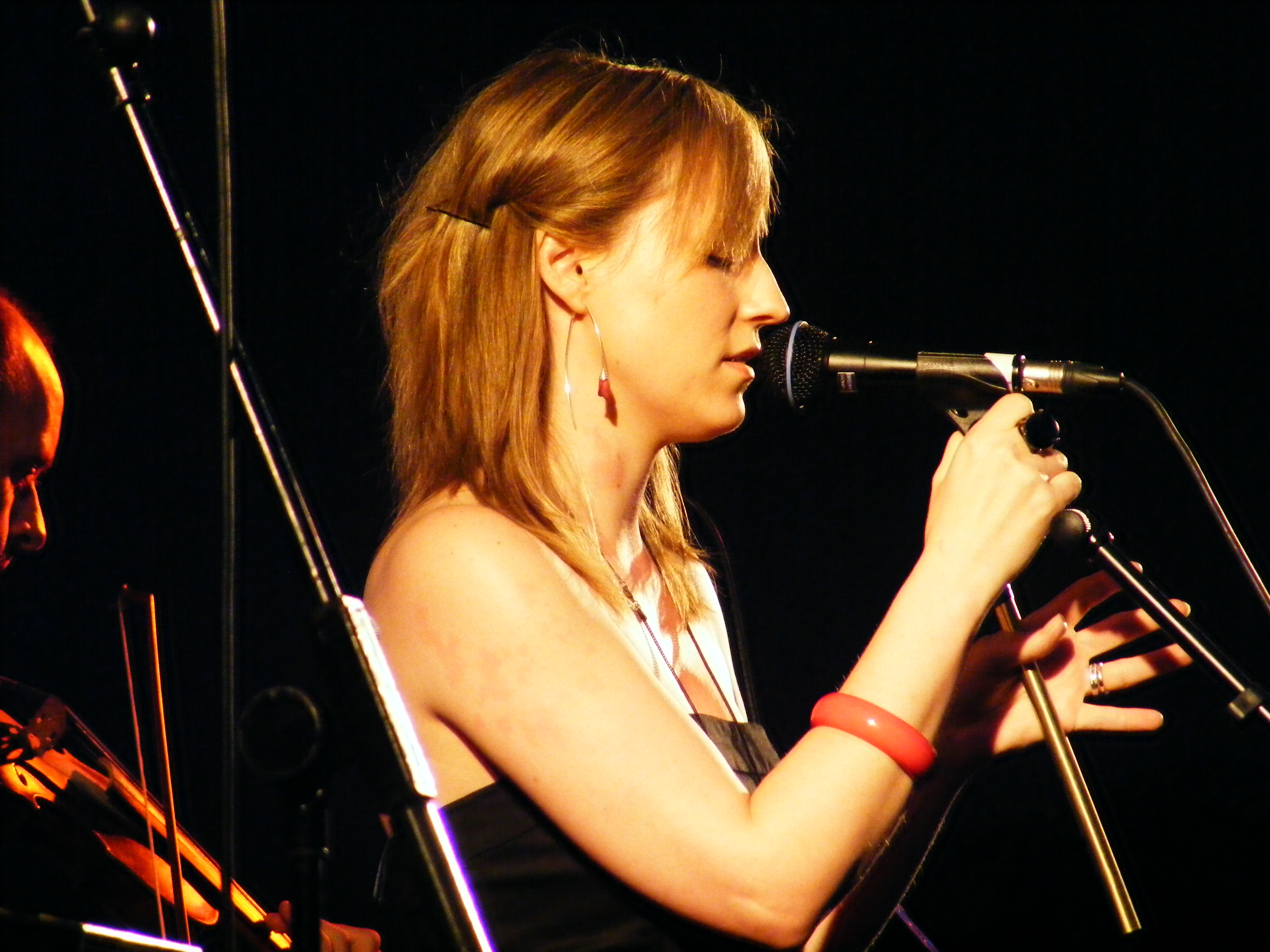
Fowlis on stage at Analog, Ringsend Dublin, July 2008

In 2008, Fowlis recorded an album with long-time friends and collaborators Muireann Nic Amhlaoibh, Ross Martin and husband Éamonn Doorley. The album, entitled Dual, was released in October 2008. Fowlis toured extensively around Scotland, Ireland, central Europe and America and launched both her solo albums while on tour. Fowlis recorded a Scottish Gaelic cover of The Beatles' song Blackbird for Mojo magazine to celebrate the 40th anniversary of The Beatles' The White Album. The song was released as a download single from Fowlis' website in October 2008.

On 24 April 2009, Fowlis announced that she would begin recording her third studio album in May and that she would preview tracks from the project on her May 2009 tour of England. On 10 August 2009, she announced the album's title, Uam (Scottish Gaelic for 'From Me'). The album was released 26 October.

In September 2011, she performed the hour-long Heisgeir at the Phipps Hall in Beauly. The piece, "half-documentary, half-arthouse meditation", celebrated "the history, landscape and legend" of the now-uninhabited Heisgeir, as part of the six "Blas 2011" concert series.

In 2012, Fowlis contributed to the Pixar film Brave with the songs "Touch the Sky" and "Into the Open Air", sung in the off-screen musical thoughts of the lead character Merida. In 2011, she graduated from the University of the Highlands and Islands (UHI) with an MA in material culture and the environment. In 2013, Fowlis was named "UHI Alumnus of the year".

Fowlis' fourth studio album, Gach Sgeul (Every Story), was released on 24 February 2014 and her fifth, Alterum, was released on 27 October 2017.

All of Fowlis' albums including Dual have been released on the Machair Records. The label, which is operated by Fowlis and her husband Éamon Doorley, is an outlet for their music. Machair "is a Gaelic word which describes rich and fertile low-lying land. Almost half of all Scottish machair occurs in the Outer Hebrides and it is one of the rarest habitat types in Europe. It is a fragile environment which is under threat, a little like the music which is produced on this label." Their label distributes through Cadiz Music.

=== Broadcasting career ===
Fowlis has a notable broadcasting career complementing her musical accomplishments. She appeared as a guest on BBC Radio Scotland's flagship traditional music programme Travelling Folk and the world music show Global Gathering. In 2007, BBC Two broadcast a one-hour documentary entitled Bliadhna Julie / Julie's Year about her travels and travails in the music business. In 2008-09, Fowlis hosted her first broadcast series, a weekly folk music programme titled Fowlis and Folk on BBC Radio Scotland. She co-presents the annual Radio 2 Folk Awards with Mark Radcliffe and has deputised for Radcliffe on his weekly BBC Radio 2 Folk Show. In 2012, a short documentary on Fowlis, her family, and her band broadcast on the United States television channel PBS as part of an episode of the program Sound Tracks: Music Without Borders.

In 2015, Fowlis and her frequent musical collaborator Muireann Nic Amhlaoibh hosted a television series Port dedicated to traditional Scottish and Irish music. In each episode, Fowlis and Nic Amhlaoibh travel to a new location highlighting local folk musicians and the local traditional music scene. The programme is narrated by Fowlis in Scottish Gaelic and Nic Amhlaoibh in Irish, with English-language subtitles. It is broadcast on both BBC Alba and TG4. The first season ran seven episodes, and a second season of seven episodes in 2016.

== Personal life ==
Fowlis lives in Dingwall, Scotland with husband Éamon Doorley, a regular member of her group as well as of the Irish traditional group Danú. The couple married in May 2007 and have two daughters, Aoibhe (b. 2010) and Niamh (b. 2012).

Fowlis campaigned for independence in the 2014 Scottish independence referendum.

== Discography ==
=== Solo recordings ===
==== Albums ====
- Mar a tha mo chridhe (2005)
- Cuilidh (2007)
- Uam (2009)
- Live at Perthshire Amber (2011)
- Gach sgeul - Every story (2014)
- Alterum (2017)

==== Singles ====
- Turas san Lochmor (2007 – from Cuilidh)
- Hùg Air A' Bhonaid Mhòir (2008 – from Cuilidh)
- Lon Dubh / Blackbird (2008 – Cover of the Beatles' "Blackbird" in Gaelic)

=== With others ===
==== Allt ====
- Allt (2018 - with Éamon Doorley, Zoë Conway and John Mc Intyre)
- Allt: Volume II Cuimhne (2024 - with Éamon Doorley, Zoë Conway and John Mc Intyre)

==== Brolum ====
- 7:11 (2000)

==== Dòchas ====
- Dòchas (2002)
- An Darna Umhail (2005)
- TBC (2009)

==== Dual ====
- Dual (2008 – with Muireann Nic Amhlaoibh)

==== Spell Songs ====
- The Lost Words: Spell Songs (2019)
- Spell Songs II: Let the Light In (2021)

==== Guest roles and other recordings ====
- Evolving Tradition 3 – Various artists (2003)
- Best in Show – Various artists (2003)
- Ceòlmhor Ostaig – Various artists (2004)
- Braighe Loch Iall – Rachel Walker (2004)
- When All is Said and Done – Danú (2005)
- Orain nan Rosach – Fiona Mackenzie (2006)
- Fáinne An Lae : Daybreak – Muireann Nic Amhlaoibh (2006)
- Òg-Mhadainn Shamhraidh – Kathleen MacInnes (2006)
- Everything You See – Runrig (2007)
- Party On The Moor (40 year anniversary) - Runrig (2013)
- Somewhere - Runrig (2018)
- Under One Sky – John McCusker (2008)
- An Cailín Rua – Kathleen Boyle (2008)
- Transatlantic Sessions 3 Vol. 1 (CD) – Various artists (2008)
- Transatlantic Sessions 3 Vol. 2 (CD) – Various artists (2008)
- Transatlantic Sessions 3 (DVD) – Various artists (2008)
- Transatlantic Sessions 4 – Various artists (2010) – DVD, CD vol. 1 and 3
- Transatlantic Sessions 6 – Various artists (2013) – DVD, CD vol. 1, 2 and 3
- Homecoming – A Scottish Fantasy (with Nicola Benedetti) (2014)
- Outlander Blood of My Blood (Original Series Soundtrack) (with Bear McCreary) (2025)
- As Long as We Breathe — Alex Mandel
- Assassin's Creed Valhalla: Wrath of the Druids (Original Game Soundtrack) – Max Aruj, Einar Selvik (2021)

== Awards and nominations ==
Fowlis was elected a Fellow of the Royal Society of Edinburgh in March 2021.

== See also ==
- Ruth Keggin, sings in Manx
- Gwenno Saunders, sings in Welsh and Cornish
