= Etymology of Skye =

Origin of the name of the Isle of Skye in Scotland

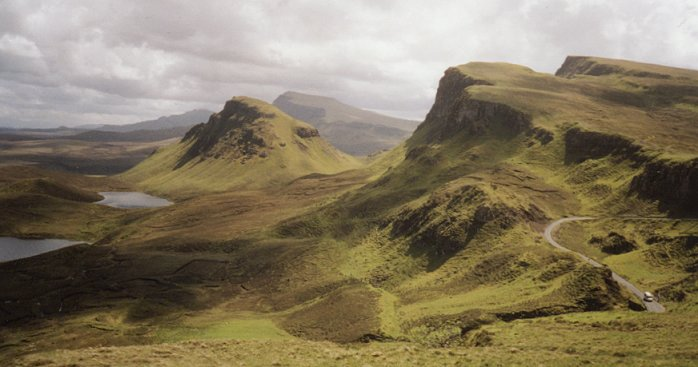
Looking south from the Quiraing, Skye.

The etymology of Skye attempts to understand the derivation of the name of the Isle of Skye in the Inner Hebrides of Scotland. Skye's history includes the influence of Gaelic, Norse and English speaking peoples, and the relationships between their names for the island are not straightforward. Ultimately, like other Scottish locations as Islay, Lewis and Arran, the origin of the name is still debated and may be impossible to discern with all known evidence.

== Details ==
The Gaelic name for the "Isle of Skye" is An t-Eilean Sgitheanach (or Sgiathanach, a more recent and less common spelling). The meaning of this name is not clear. Various etymologies have been proposed, such as the "winged isle" or "the notched isle", but no definitive solution has been found to date and the placename may be from a yet-unknown substratum language and thus simply opaque.

For example, writing in 1549, Donald Munro, High Dean of the Isles wrote: "This Ile is callit Ellan Skiannach in Irish, that is to say in Inglish the wyngit Ile, be reason it has mony wyngis and pointis lyand furth fra it, throw the dividing of thir foirsaid Lochis".

This was by no means the first written reference. Roman sources refer to the Scitis (see the Ravenna Cosmography) and Scetis can be found on a map by Ptolemy. A possible derivation from *skitis, an early Celtic word for "winged", which may describe the island's peninsulas that radiate out from a mountainous centre, has also been suggested.

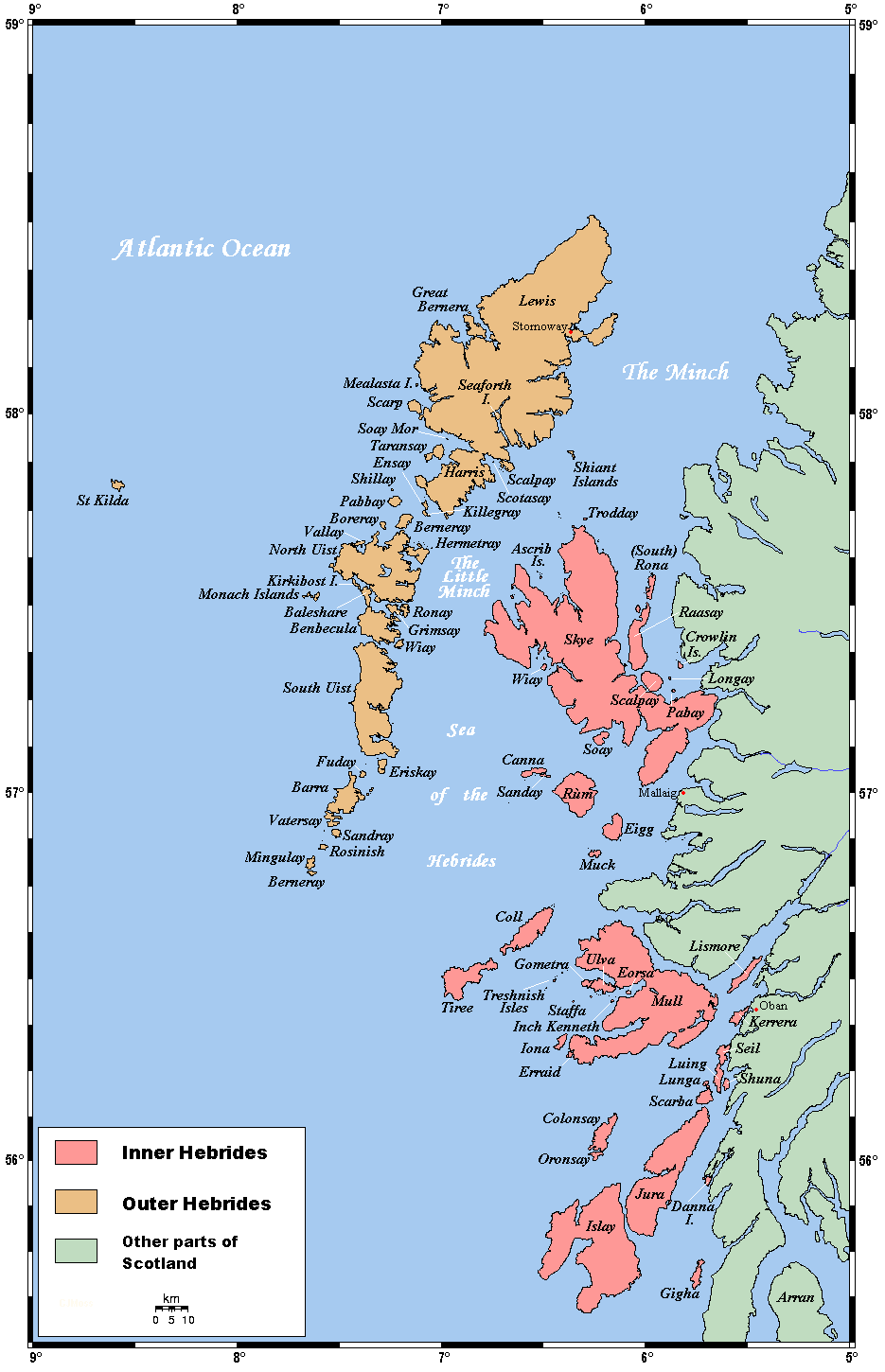
Skye is the northernmost of the Inner Hebrides, coloured red on this map of western Scotland.

In the Norse sagas Skye is called Skíð, for example in the Hákonar saga Hákonarsonar, and in a skaldic poem in Saga Magnús konungs berfœtts in the Heimskringla from c. 1230. According to other authors, it was referred to in Norse as skuy "misty isle", *skýey, or skuyö "cloud isle". It is not certain whether the Gaelic poetic name for the island, Eilean a' Cheò "isle of the mist" precedes or postdates the Norse name. Some legends also associate the isle with the mythic figure of the warrior Scáthach.

The problems with the proposed Gaelic etymologies can be summed up as follows. Firstly, the Gaelic word for "winged" is sgiathach and sgiathanach is not attested in Gaelic except in the place name and the ethnonym Sgiathanach "person from Skye". Secondly, the recorded pronunciations all point towards a clear [a] preceding the -ach ending: [ˈs̪kʲiəhanəx], [ˈs̪kʲiə.anəx], or [ˈs̪kʲi.aːnəx]. This means the form Sgiathanach is very unlikely to be based on the Gaelic plural of "wing" (sgiathan), which contains a schwa in the last syllable ([ˈs̪kʲiəhən]) and would represent a highly unusual adjectival form based on a plural noun. Thirdly, the diminutive/nominaliser ending -an would result in [ˈs̪kʲiəhan], with a clear [a] in the last syllable. This form sciathán or sgiathan is indeed attested in the modern Gaelic languages. The Old Irish attested form is scíath (cognate with modern Welsh ysgwydd "shoulder") with a reconstructed Celtic form *skeito-, which suggests the Irish form sgiathán is an innovation and an unlikely root for Sgiathanach. Finally, deriving the name from Scáthach involves two main problems: there would be a case of unexplained palatalisation of [s̪k] to [s̪kʲ] and an unexplained extra element -an-.

The roots of the Roman and Greek forms, Scit- and Scet- (meaning unknown), could be the root of Sgitheanach as they would regularly develop into Old Gaelic [s̪gʲiθ-] and be an entirely logical source for the attested Norse Skíð. It would also lead to modern Sgitheanach via a regular suffigation of -an and -ach to form an ethnonym and adjective. This would also explain the use of an apparent root form in An Cuan Sgith(e) The Minch (the strait separating the Outer Hebrides from the Inner Hebrides) and the older Irish form of Scíth rather than the modern An tOileán Sgiathanach, for example: Do ṡiuḃal sé Scíṫ agus an dá Uiḃeast agus Beinn a' Ṁaola... "He travelled Skye and the two Uists and Benbecula...". In this case the interpretation of the name as "winged" may simply be a case of folk etymology.
