= Dàimh =

Scottish folk band

Dàimh (pronounced "dive") is a folk band which performs in Scottish Gaelic.

Its members are Angus MacKenzie (whistle/bagpipes), Gabe McVarish (fiddle), Ellen MacDonald (voice/bagpipes), Murdo Cameron (mandolin/accordion) and Ross Martin (guitar). In addition, Calum Alex MacMillan sang with them on their album Crossing Point.

Dàimh was established in the western Gàidhealtachd as this was the homeland of the original members. Angus MacKenzie is from Mabou, Nova Scotia, on Cape Breton Island; Gabe McVarish is from California; Ross Martin is from Arisaig; Griogair Labhruidh is from Balloch; and Murdo Cameron from Glenelg.

The group has released seven albums.

== Discography ==
- Moidart to Mabou (2000)
  - 1. Welcome to Scotsville
  - 2. Go Jerry!
  - 3. Oran Eile do'n Phrionnsa
  - 4. Goat Island
  - 5. Nighean Donn a' Chuailein Riomhaich
  - 6. Strathspeys & Reels
  - 7. The King
  - 8. The Brown One
  - 9. Song & March
  - 10. Polkas
  - 11. Wise Maid Set
- Pirates of Puirt (2004)
  - 1. Supernose
  - 2. Wreckd ‘er
  - 3. Slippy Sean’s
  - 4. The Funny Whistle
  - 5. Bonny Doon
  - 6. C Tune
  - 7. Toad
  - 8. The Sandy Lad
  - 9. Mazurka
  - 10. The Lady’s Dance
- Crossing Point (2007) Greentrax
  - 1. Dòmhnaill Mòr
  - 2. Mo Nighean Chruinn Donn
  - 3. Trip to Glenfinnan
  - 4. Anxo's
  - 5. Nuair a Chi Thu Caileag Bhòidheach
  - 6. Turbo Shandy
  - 7. Òran a Mhagarine
  - 8. Murdo's
  - 9. Sealg a's Sùgradh nan Gleann
  - 10. Eathar Dubh a Bradhagair
  - 11. Dram
  - 12. Polkas
- Diversions (2010)
  - 1. Sporan Dhòmhnaill
  - 2. Ida’s Jig
  - 3. Mo Mhàili Bheag Òg
  - 4. Lads and Lasses
  - 5. An Caol Loch Eilt
  - 6.Taighean Geala
  - 7.‘S dubh choisich mi ‘n oidhche
  - 8. Clann Mhàrtainn
  - 9. He ‘m èille
  - 10. Lock and Load
  - 11. Nan ceadaicheadh an tìde dhomh
- Tuneship (2014)
  - 1. Raasay
  - 2. Barra to Balloch
  - 3. Coddywatch
  - 4. Siud Agaibh an Deoch a dh’ Òlainn
  - 5. Bottle for Brigg
  - 6. Stormy Hill
  - 7. Hiù ra bhò Nuair a Chaidh mi a Ghlaschu
  - 8. The Gannet
  - 9. Mo Ghleannan Taobh Loch Lìobhann
  - 10. Banjo's Favourite
- The Hebridean Sessions (2015)
  - 1. Locheil's awa’ to France
  - 2. Dhannsamaid le Ailean
  - 3. O fair a-nall am botal
  - 4. Bog an Iochan
  - 5. Mike MacDougall's O' KEeefe's Pattern day
  - 6. Cuir a-nall Mor-a-bhitheag
  - 7. Gur e mo ghille dubh dhonn
  - 8. Biodag aig MacThomais
  - 9. Oran an tombaca
  - 10. The Lassies Fashion
- The Rough Bounds (2018)
  - 1. ’S Trusaidh mi na Coilleagan
  - 2. 12th of June
  - 3. Tha Fadachd orm Fhìn
  - 4. Donald MacLeod Reels
  - 5. Òran Bhàgh a’ Chàise
  - 6. Mary's Fancy
  - 7. A Nìghneag a Ghràidh
  - 8. Bodach Innse Chrò
  - 9. Happy Fish
  - 10. Turas Dhòmhsa Chun na Galldachd
  - 11. Chì mi’n Toman
- Sula (2023)
  - 1. If It Plays
  - 2. Chaidh Mis‘ a dh’Eubhal Imprig
  - 3. Miss MacGregor's Traditional Jigs
  - 4. Tàladh Choinnich Òig
  - 5. Tha Ghaoth an Iar a' Gobachadh
  - 6. PUFF PUFF
  - 7. An Dubh Ghleannach
  - 8. Peggy Shrimpy Jonny
  - 9. Altsasaig
  - 10. Laoidh Fhearchair Eòghainn

== Other performances ==
The band played at the Cèilidh a' Cho-fhlaitheis at Pacific Quay beside the BBC building in Glasgow in 2014. Dòmhnall Seathach performed with them. They were recorded on BBC Alba.
