= Cuilidh =

Studio album by Julie Fowlis
- Released: 2007
- Recorded: 2007
- Genre: Folk; Celtic
- Label: Machair (own label); Shoeshine Records

Julie Fowlis chronology
Mar a tha mo chridhe (2005)	Cuilidh (2007)	Uam (2009)

Singles from Cuilidh
- 1. "Turas san Lochmor" Released: 2007; 2. "Hùg Air A' Bhonaid Mhòir" Released: 2008

Cuilidh ("Retreat") is the second album by Scottish musician Julie Fowlis. It won the 2007 Album of the Year at the Scots Trad Music Awards.

The album spawned two singles: "Turas san Lochmor" and "Hùg Air A' Bhonaid Mhòir" (Celebrate the Big Bonnet). The latter is an example of puirt à beul.

== Track listing ==
1. "Hùg air a' Bhonaid Mhòir" – 2:58
2. "Mo Ghruagach Dhonn" – 3:59
3. "An t-Aparan Goirid 's an t-Aparan Ùr: Òran do Sheasaidh Bhaile Raghnaill" – 4:05
4. "'Ille Dhuinn, 's toigh Leam Thu" – 3:40
5. "Puirt à beul Set ('S Toigh Leam Fhìn Buntàta 's Ìm/Tha Fionnlagh ag Innearadh/Hùg Oiridh Hiridh Hairidh)" – 3:39
6. "Set of Jigs (The Thatcher/Peter Byrne's/The Tripper's)" – 3:42
7. "Mo Dhòmhnallan Fhèin" – 3:57
8. "Turas san Lochmor" – 4:04
9. "Òran nan Raiders" – 3:44
10. "Bodaich Odhar Hoghaigearraidh" – 2:49
11. "Mo Bheannachd dhan Bhàillidh Ùr" – 4:12
12. "Aoidh, Na Dèan Cadal Idir" – 2:16

== Deluxe edition ==
A deluxe edition of Cuilidh was released in the UK and Ireland on 1 December 2008. The box set contains Cuilidh, a disc of songs from the album performed live at Celtic Connections in 2008, and a DVD documentary. The box set was released in the United States on 21 April 2009.

=== Disc one – Cuilidh ===
1. "Hùg air a' Bhonaid Mhòir" – 2:58
2. "Mo Ghruagach Dhonn" – 3:59
3. "An t-Aparan Goirid 's an t-Aparan Ùr: Òran do Sheasaidh Bhaile Raghnaill" – 4:05
4. "'Ille Dhuinn, 's toigh Leam Thu" – 3:40
5. "Puirt à beul Set ('S Toigh Leam Fhìn Buntàta 's Ìm/Tha Fionnlagh ag Innearadh/Hùg Oiridh Hiridh Hairidh)" – 3:39
6. "Set of Jigs (The Thatcher/Peter Byrne's/The Tripper's)" – 3:42
7. "Mo Dhòmhnallan Fhèin" – 3:57
8. "Turas san Lochmor" – 4:04
9. "Òran nan Raiders" – 3:44
10. "Bodaich Odhar Hoghaigearraidh" – 2:49
11. "Mo Bheannachd dhan Bhàillidh Ùr" – 4:12
12. "Aoidh, Na Dèan Cadal Idir" – 2:16

=== Disc two – At Celtic Connections ===
1. "Lon-Dubh" (Blackbird) – 2:24
2. "Òganaich Ùir A Rinn M' Fhàgail" – 2:49
3. "Mo Bheannachd Dhan Bhàillidh Ùr" – 4:03
4. "Turas San Lochmor" – 3:38
5. "Thatcher/Peter Byrne's/The Soup Dragon/Mo Chuachag's Laghach Thu" – 4:23
6. "Biodh An Deoch Seo 'n Làimh Mo Rùin" – 3:21

=== DVD – Julie Fowlis Documentary ===
1. "Hello, I'm Julie Fowlis" – 7:23
