= Rogue's Harbor =

1964 American novel by Inglis Fletcher

- Author: Inglis Fletcher
- Language: English
- Publisher: Bobbs-Merrill
- Publication date: February 1964
- Publication place: United States
- Media type: Print (hardcover)
- Preceded by: Wicked Lady

Inglis Fletcher is a 1964 historical novel by American author Inglis Fletcher. It was Fletcher's sixteenth novel, and the last she published before her death. It was also the last of her "Carolina Series" of novels, all of which are self-contained works of historical fiction set in colonial North Carolina.

== Plot ==
The novel follows the fortunes of the fictional Nathan Willoughby and his family. There is an emphasis on daughter Judith's romantic adventures. In a subplot, son Matthew Willoughby is kidnapped by pirates.

== Reception ==
The novel was not well reviewed when it was published in the spring of 1964. As with her novel, Wicked Lady, reviewers noted that Rogue's Harbor was not up to the standard of Fletcher's earlier work. The Boston Globe described it as a clear indication of the Carolina Series' diminishing returns:

Spiced with insurrection, obdurate governors, and a bit of piracy, "Rogue's Harbor" follows the orthodox recipe for historical fiction of its type. But not too successfully. The rich lode which produced the first half doze of Mrs. Fletcher's Carolina series, and gave readers such lively yarns as Men of Albermarle and Lusty Wind for Carolina, has run thin in its 13th reworking.

Writing in the Fort Worth Star-Telegram, Pauline Reed called it "somewhat thin in detail and color at first, [though] it gains momentum as it goes along and is a worthwhile study of an interesting time in history."
