= The Wicked Lady (disambiguation) =

The Wicked Lady can refer to:

- The Wicked Lady, a 1945 film
  - The Wicked Lady (1983 film), a 1983 remake of the above film
    - The Wicked Lady (album), the soundtrack album to the 1983 film, by Tony Banks
- Lady Katherine Ferrers, believed by some to be a notorious highwaywoman known as the "Wicked Lady"
- Wicked Lady (novel), a 1952 American historical novel by Inglis Fletcher
- Wicked Woman (film), a 1953 American film noir starring Beverly Michaels and Richard Egan
- Black Lady, a Sailor Moon character who is called "Wicked Lady" is some adaptations

== See also ==
- Wicked (disambiguation)
