= Toil of the Brave =

1946 American novel by Inglis Fletcher

- Author: Inglis Fletcher
- Language: English
- Publisher: Bobbs-Merrill
- Publication date: 1946
- Publication place: United States
- Media type: Print (hardcover)
- Pages: 547
- Preceded by: Lusty Wind for Carolina (1944)
- Followed by: Roanoke Hundred (1948)

Toil of the Brave is a 1946 American historical novel by Inglis Fletcher. It was the fourth of twelve novels by Fletcher that comprise her "Carolina Series" and was the first book in the series not to serve as a prequel to Raleighʻs Eden. The title is taken from an ode by Pindar.

== Plot ==
The novel follows the adventures of Peter Huntley, a captan in the Continental Army, who is ordered to track down and neutralize officer Anthony Allison, a British spy. Angela Ferrier, a senator's daughter, becomes romantically involved with both of them while the cause of American independence from Britain becomes a "strange passion" of hers.

A majority of the novel is set in locales near Albemarle Sound and along the Chowan River, this setting being a staple of Fletcher's Carolina series. The action takes place "just after the low ebb of Valley Forge" and Fletcher depicts "the almost disastrous lack of money, supplies, and coordination that beset the American cause" in detail. The novel's dramatic climax occurs during the Battle of Kings Mountain.

== Publication History ==
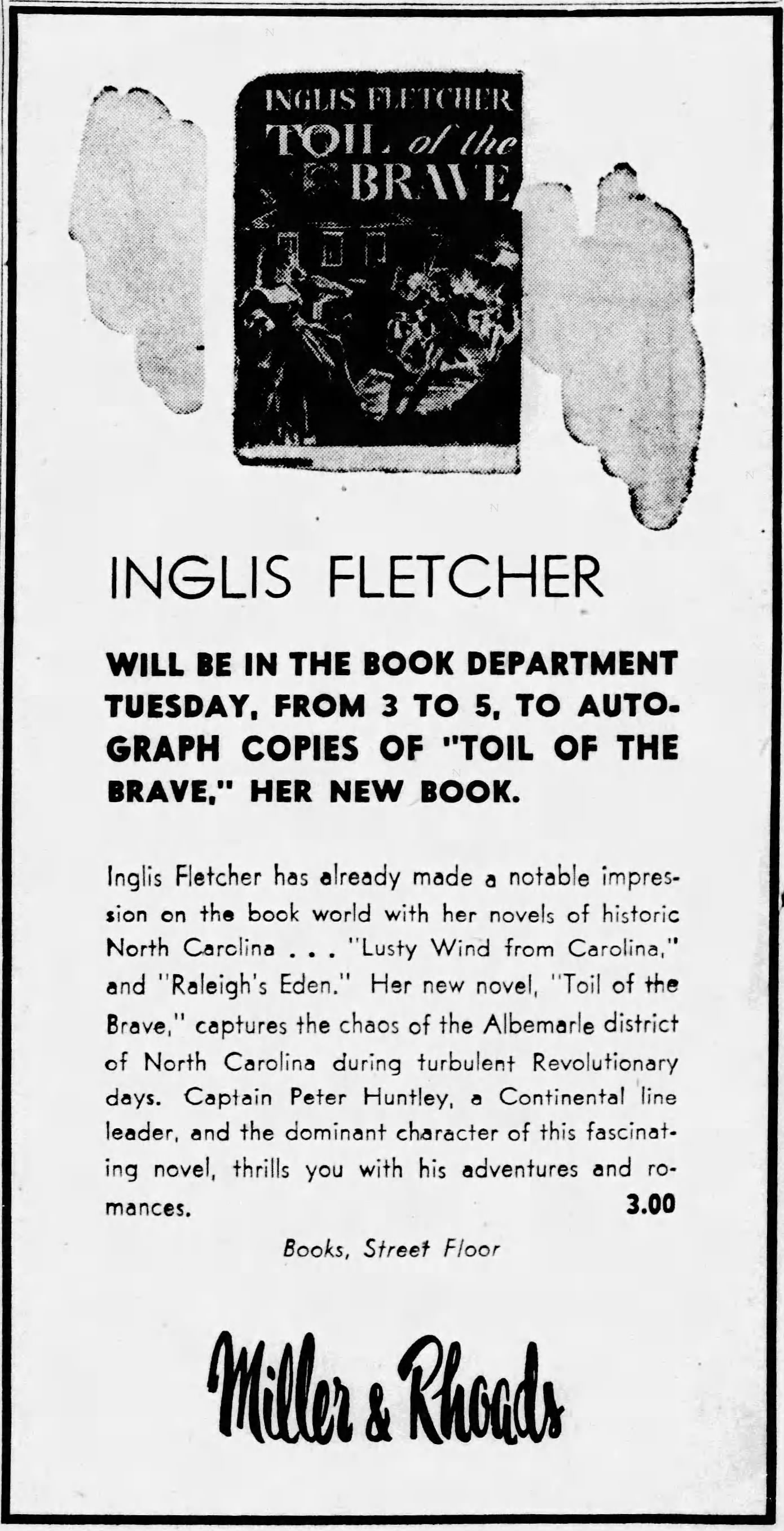
Advertisement for Richmond, Virginia, book signing connected with "Toil of the Brave." (Richmond Times-Dispatch Tuesday, Nov 12, 1946.)

The novel was first published in hardcover with a wrap-around dust jacket illustrated by Paul Laune. In 1971, a paperback edition was published by Bantam.

== Reception ==
Toil of the Brave, like Fletcher's previous Carolina books, received positive reviews. The Chicago Tribune's Walter Havighurst wrote that the novel exhibited "sound historical framework already established in her Albemarle tales." John Browning's review in The Daily Dispatch called it "engrossing" and predicted that it would be popular title. Writing for The Plain Dealer, Naomi Bender Sinks described it as a welcome alternative to the "many luridly cheap books, masquerading as historical fiction, (that) have flooded the bookstalls (in) the past few years." Sinks gave the book a positive review, despite admitting that it "occasionally drags and suffers from an over-abundance of characters and detail."

James H. Powers, writing for The Boston Globe, called Toil of the Brave an "admirably handled historical novel" that maintained the high standard of writing and research that characterized Fletcher's previous work:

"The particular skill of Inglis Fletcher lies in her ability to people her stories with numerous characters which give the reader a strong sense of acquaintance with the whole community dealt with. 'Toil of the Brave' swarms with people, and they are all of them kept distinct and made very real. The historical material is splendidly managed and always subordinated to the tale, which unfolds with spacious leisure. This is a good novel for the Winter fireside."

Richard A. Stevens of The Hartford Courant wrote that the novel "perhaps dwelt too much on the customs of the day" for the average reader, but that "those who enjoy the chronicle of such matters...will welcome the author's meticulous attention to detail;" he concluded that Toil of the Brave was "a vivid tale that will rejoice the hearts of all lovers of the historical novel." The Lewiston Daily Sun called it "a grand story" and "highly recommended." Arthur Draper of the The Houston Post called it "a grand story that asks for more."
