= The Scotswoman =

1954 American novel by Inglis Fletcher

- Title page for The Scotswoman (1954)
- Author: Inglis Fletcher
- Language: English
- Publisher: Bobbs-Merrill
- Publication date: 1954
- Publication place: United States
- Media type: Print (hardcover)

The Scotswoman is an American historical novel by Inglis Fletcher. The novel dramatizes the experiences of Flora MacDonald before and during the American Revolutionary War after emigrating to what would become North Carolina. Known for her Carolina Series, in which fictional lead characters interact with real historical figures and events, this was Fletcher's first novel to center an actual historical figure as its protagonist.

== Plot ==
Following the defeat of the Scots at Culloden, Flora MacDonald becomes one of many Highlanders to emigrate to the Americas and settle in North Carolina. Tensions between loyalists and Whigs, which eventually lead to the Battle of Moore's Creek Bridge (depicted in the novel's climax), causes termoil between Flora and her husband Allan as they start to develop differing loyalties. There is an additional romantic subplot following Douglas MacDonald (Allan's twin brother) and fellow Scottish immigrant Moira MacQueen, as well as a love triangle between "snobbish English Girl" Cecily Weston, British officer James Blair, and silversmith-turned-Whigs leader Stephen Moray.

== Publication ==
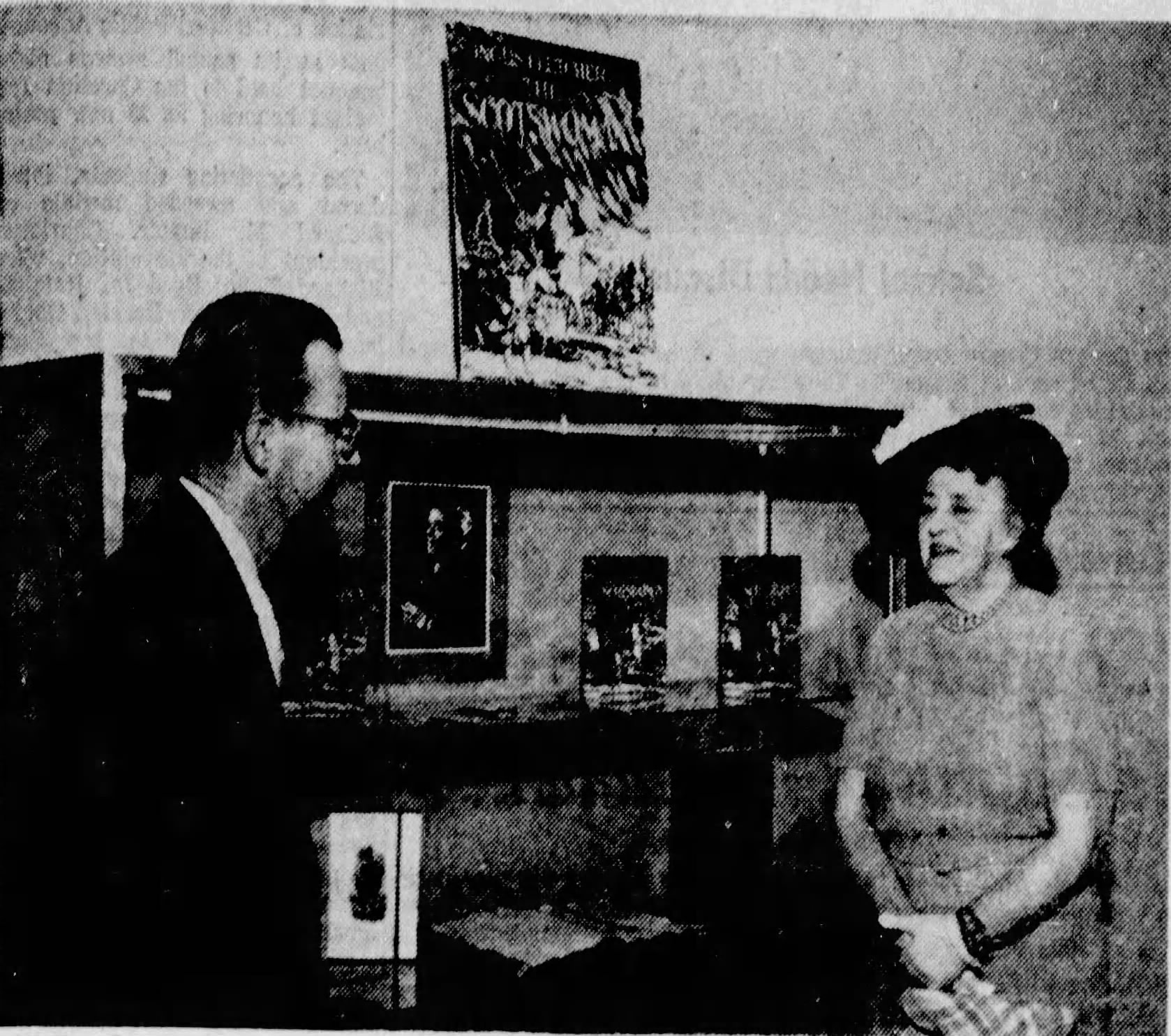
Inglis Fletcher (R) being interviewed by Dr. Andrew H. Horn at an event promoting The Scotswoman in Chapel Hill, North Carolina, on April 22, 1955.

As with all of Fletcher's Carolina novels, The Scotswoman was published in the United States by Bobbs-Merrill. The Literary Guild of America selected the novel as its featured book for May, 1955. In Canada, it was published by McClelland & Stewart It was reissued in paperback in 1974 by Bantam.

== Reception ==
The Scotswoman received mixed reviews, although some critics felt it maintained both the high quality of Fletcher's previous work. Ruth Loaring-Clark Mainord, in her review for The Jackson Sun, described it as "a delight" and write that the reader will "feel that he is living with her characters rather than reading about them." Hilda Noel Schroetter of the Richmond Times-Dispatch called it "a milestone in Mrs. Fletcher's career" and "a poignant portrayal of a woman torn by her need for peace, by her love for her husband, and most of all by the habit of command which has been thust upon her." Schroetter was one of the few reviewers to specifically praise Fletcher increased focus on character development:

Heretofore, (Fletcher's) books have been concerned mainly with events; her characters gave been sketched in hastily [sic] at times, subordinated to the unfolding of the plot. Here Mrs. Fletcher employs the full extent of her powers in painting the portrait of a woman against a turbulent background.

Walter Spearman, writing for the Asheville Citizen-Times, similarly praised Fletcher's character development, holding up, among the supporting characters, Douglas MacDonald as "more complex than most of Mrs. Fletcher's characters." He also described the evolving relationship between Flora and Allan as "the best scenes of the novel."

L.S. Munn of The Springfield Sunday Republican wrote that Fletcher's thorough historical research and "warm and lively" writing style "helps to conceal the threads of her central theme," concluding that "The Scotswoman is not among her best novels." Writing for The Anniston Star, Barbara Hodge Hall noted that "the North Carolina portion of The Scotswoman does not live up to the promise of the earlier chapters," but attributed this more to "the sometimes disappointing turn of history itself" rather than any technical or stylistic failings by Fletcher. Hall gave the book a positive review, arguing that Fletcher's departure from her usual formula was "one which many readers will find more than welcome." The Boston Globe offered, sympathetically, that Fletcher may have been out of her depth when tackling a project of this scale:

It is undoubtedly a bold foray in story telling but, apparently, the sheer volume of the historical material and the extraordinary time-span involved, have proved too much even for Inglis Fletcher's proven competence. ... To merge the glamorous tale of [Bonnie Prince Charlie's] rescue with the swirl and surge of the American Revolution involves an almost impossible feat for any writer, however talented."

Kathleen Graham, writing for the Regina Leader-Post, was more dismissive: "Far too many incidents in The Scotswoman follow the tried and true pattern of the historical novel. By the time the most interesting part of the plot is reached—the part played by the Scottish settlers in the War of Independence—it is too late —one is anaesthetized [sic] by the background." The review in The Hamilton Spectator allowed that The Scotswoman had "its stirring moments" but dismissed it as an "inflated, gaudily-jacketed historical romance, whose ultimate and deserved destiny, if it is lucky, will be a motion picture."

In a review for The Richmond News Leader, Lawrence S. Thompson criticized the novel's pacing, "awkward dialog" (much of which he felt was anachronistic), and "annoying...cloak and dagger play involving a secret message for Governor Martin." He concluded: "Only an inveterate Inglis Fletcher fan or an aficionado of North Carolina history will take the four or five evenings necessary to read the whole book."

== Legacy ==
When writing about the Literary Guild of America in 1977 for its semicentennial, Thomas Collins derisively singled out The Scotswoman as one of the Guild's more inexplicable, undeserving selections.
