= The Wind in the Forest =

1957 American novel by Inglis Fletcher

- Title page for The Wind in the Forest (1957)
- Author: Inglis Fletcher
- Language: English
- Publisher: Bobbs-Merrill
- Publication date: 1957
- Publication place: United States
- Media type: Print (hardcover)
- Pages: 448

The Wind in the Forest is a 1957 American historical romance novel by Inglis Fletcher. It is the eighth title in Fletcher's "North Carolina series," and one of several that are set during or just before the American Revolutionary War (which is also depicted). Fictional characters, including a female romantic interest that Inglis based upon her own great grandmother, interact with real historical figures like Edmund Fanning, William Tryon and Herman Husband.

== Plot ==
Although nominally a romance between the fictional "young Hillary Caswell and the roguish redhead, Cecelia Chapman," the novel depicts the formation of the Regulator Movement in 1770, as well as the events that led up to Battle of Alamance.

== Publication ==
The Wind in the Forest was published in the fall of 1957 in the United States by Bobbs-Merrill, and in Canada by McClelland. It was reissued in paperback in 1975 by Bantam.

== Reception ==
Richard Walser, a reviewer for the Raleigh News and Observer, described the novel as "diffuse" (focussed on too many disparate storylines) but also "lively and exciting." Writing in the Newport News Daily Press, Mildred T. Russell called it "a pleasure" and reported that, in keeping with Fletcher's previous work, "history and fiction are woven into an exciting, living pattern."
