= Wicked Lady (novel) =

1962 American novel by Inglis Fletcher

- Title page for Wicked Lady (1962)
- Author: Inglis Fletcher
- Language: English
- Publisher: Bobbs-Merrill
- Publication date: June 19, 1962
- Publication place: United States
- Media type: Print (hardcover)
- Pages: 256

Wicked Lady the penultimate novel by Inglis Fletcher. As with most of Fletcher's output, it is a work of historical fiction set in colonial Edenton and coastal North Carolina during the American Revolution. It was first published by Bobbs-Merrill in 1962.

== Plot ==
The novel concerns the adventures of fictitious Lady Anne Stuart. Though already married to Baron Von Poellnitz, a wealthy German planter, Lady Anne becomes romantically entangled with another man and "becomes a victim of her own unscrupulousness." Historical figures that appear in the novel include Stephen Cabarrus, Charles Cornwallis, Henry Clinton, and the Marquis de Lafayette. Though most of the action is set in Edenton, colonial Charleston and Yorktown are also depicted; the climax of the novel depicts the Siege of Yorktown.

== Development ==
The novel took at least a year to write. A News & Observer article from March, 1961, reported that Fletcher had already selected the title and was developing the story.

== Reception ==
Wicked Lady received mixed reviews and was generally not considered by critics to be up to the standard of Fletcher's earlier work.

In her review for the Nashville Banner, Leila Douglas Phillips wrote that "Wicked Lady is neither historically as great an effort nor character-wise up to the standards of some of [Fletcher's] exceedingly popular historical romances, Raleighʻs Eden, Toil of the Brave and Queen's Gift." Similarly, the Boston Globe wrote that "Mrs. Inglis is a long way, in this stilted hodgepodge, from the skills she displayed in Raleighʻs Eden." The Hamilton Spectator called it "wearying" and "a bore," stating: "Mrs. Fletcher is reciting American history here in the way Upton Sinclair did in the Lanny Budd series and she does it poorly." The Bangor Daily News said that it "does not seem quite as strong in depth as some of the others" but still called it "interesting reading."

A positive review in the Newport News Daily Press called it "the work of the historical novelist at its best" and opined that Fletcher's fanbase would pleased with it. The Fort Worth Star-Telegram offered little praise beyond a general observation that it "effectively combines fact and fiction." The St. Louis Post-Dispatch called it "light reading about a very dark lady." It was described as "not a great book, by any stretch of the imagination," by The Province, but "a good mix of war and love that would fit into a summer's day reading." It also received positive reviews in smaller papers like Beaumont Journal and the Daily Press, the latter being a Newport News, Virginia, paper that was close to Fletcher's own place of residence.
