= The Birthday Murder =

1945 novel by Lange Lewis

- Author: Lange Lewis
- Language: English
- Genre: Detective fiction
- Publisher: Bobbs-Merrill Company
- Publication date: 1945
- Pages: 206

The Birthday Murder is a 1945 novel by American author Lange Lewis. The story follows the Los Angeles lieutenant Richard Tuck, who is investigating the murder of movie producer Albert Hime and his wife, Victoria Jason Hime, who wrote a novel where a woman's husband is killed in similar circumstances. Published by Bobbs-Merrill, it received positive reviews from critics.

== Plot ==
Richard Tuck, a lieutenant in the Los Angeles Police Department's homicide squad, investigates a case where the B movie producer Albert Hime is murdered the night before his wife's birthday. His wife, Victoria Jason Hime, is the author of the novel Ina Hart, which depicts a woman poisoning her husband and when her husband dies in the same way as the character in her novel, Victoria becomes the primary suspect. The other suspects are Moira Hastings, an actress who wants to appear in a film of Ina Hart directed by Albert; Bernice Saxe, a family friend; Captain Sawn Harriss, Victoria's ex-husband; and Hazel, the family maid.

== Background and publication ==
Lange Lewis published her first novel featuring Richard Tuck in 1942, Murder Among Friends. Tuck re-appeared in two subsequent novels, Juliet Dies Twice and Meat for Murder. Bobbs-Merrill published The Birthday Murder in 1945. It was reprinted in 1976 by Garland Publishing in its series by editors Jacques Barzun and Wendell Hertig, "Fifty Classics of Crime Fiction, 1900–1950". The novel was re-published in 2023 by American Mystery Classics, an imprint by Otto Penzler, with a new introduction by Randal S. Brandt.

== Reception ==
The novel generally received the most positive reviews of Lewis's works, including a review from the critic Anthony Boucher that it was her best novel. It received a starred review from A Catalogue of Crime, which praised the plot and prose, describing it as "full of women sharply differentiated". The Los Angeles setting generally was praised, as well as the plot and the twist ending. The novel uses the gilded cage motif.
