= Queen's Gift =

1952 American novel by Inglis Fletcher

- Title page for Queen's Gift (1952)
- Author: Inglis Fletcher
- Language: English
- Publisher: Bobbs-Merrill
- Publication date: 1952
- Publication place: United States
- Media type: Print (hardcover)
- Pages: 448

Queen's Gift is a 1952 American historical novel by Inglis Fletcher, the seventh (of twelve) titles in her "Carolina Series" that began in 1940 with the publication of Raleigh's Eden.

The story mixes fictional romantic plot-lines with actual historical events surrounding the political conflicts associated with North Carolina's entry into the Union. James Iredell, Samuel Johnston and Penelope Barker are among the historical figures depicted; the novel also dramatizes the Hillsborough and Fayetteville Conventions.

Fletcher reportedly called Queen's Gift "the most difficult book she had ever written" up to that point. Upon its publication, it was announced that Queen's Gift would be the final entry in the Carolina Series, but Fletcher subsequently wrote five more novels, publishing the last in 1964.

== Publication history ==
As with Fletcher's other Carolina Novels, Queen's Gift was published by Bobbs-Merrill in hardcover with a colorful wraparound illustrated dust jacket by Paul Laune. In addition to a Canadian hardcover edition, the novel was published in full in the August 1, 1953, edition of The Vancouver Province as their Province Book-of-the-Week. It was republished in mass market paperback format by Bantam in 1973.

== Reception ==
Richard Walser, a reviewer for the Raleigh News and Observer, said that "Queen's Gift represents Inglis Fletcher at her best" and declared that "(n)o literate North Carolinan would ever dare admit not having read it." Victor P. Hass also provided a positive review, writing of its position in the series: "I closed Queen's Gift with real regret; it will seem strange not to look forward to another panel in the series." The Pasadena Star-News called it "a thoroughly fine book from every standpoint" and "the best of the lot" of the Carolina Series. In The Buffalo News, with reviewer Carol Willis called it Fletcher's "most ambitious" work yet, but stated that it "lacks humanity."
