= Men of Albemarle =

1942 American novel by Inglis Fletcher

- Author: Inglis Fletcher
- Language: English
- Publisher: Bobbs-Merrill
- Publication date: October 1942
- Publication place: United States
- Media type: Print (hardcover)
- Pages: 566

Men of Albemarle is a 1940 American historical romance novel by Inglis Fletcher. It was the second of what would become her twelve-book "Carolina Series." It was written and published after the first novel in the series, Raleighʻs Eden, but is set earlier. It was well received and praised for its attention to historic detail.

== Plot ==
The action is set in 1710-1712 against the backdrop of Queen Anne's War, the Cary Rebellion, and the development of plantation and slave labor economy in the Province of Carolina. The novel's fictional plot revolves largely around the romance of Mary Tower, a Scottish noblewoman, and her niece Marita, as well as plantation owner Roger Mainwairing. Political turmoil back home in England causes friction between the characters and their diverging loyalties. Historical figures depicted include Edward Hyde and Thomas Cary.

== Publication ==
Men of Albemarle went through six printings at Bobbs-Merrill, the last of which was in September 1947. By the fall of 1943, it was reported in The Evening Star that it had been published in Britain and Sweden and had been translated into Swedish and Danish. It was subsequently published by Doubleday in 1951 and by Bantam in 1970 and 1980.

== Development ==
According to The News & Observer, Fletcher had completed Men of Albemarle in July 1942 and was presently developing a follow up work. She began writing Men of Albemarle while staying at Greenville Plantation in Edenton, North Carolina in 1940, but finished the novel at her then-current home in Santa Ana, California. She drew on her experiences in British East Africa when writing developing the black enslaved characters. She also went to England and to Nassau to do original research for the novel.

== Reception ==
As with Fletcher's previous work, Men of Albemarle received positive reviews. The Chicago Tribune called it "a vivid and crowded story, a triple decker of intrigue, romance, and battle" and commended Fletcher's craft: "Inglis Fletcher misses noe of the tricks of costume drama. She uses lavish colors and furnishes her story richly with period details. She builds up dramatic and melodramatic scenes." The Philadelphia Inquirer said that "Miss Fletcher writes with a practised [sic] heart and hand;" she handled the romantic plots with "flavor and charm" and her depiction of the Quakers made for "fascinating reading."

It was called "a masterful blend of history and fiction" in the Memphis Commercial Appeal: "The descriptions of the taverns and ordinaries in Carolina sound as authentic and written-on-the-spot as do Addison's coffee house essays." The Nashville Banner described it as "well above the usual run of historical novels," the Winston-Salem Journal described it as telling "a love story with the ancient savor, beauty and gallantry of the people of the day," and it was called "intensely delightful and absorbing" by The Roanoke Times. The Atlanta Constitution "History is stirred to life as the story marches from one incident to another and threads of plot and intrigue converge into the knots of dramatic climax." The San Francisco Call Bulletin described it as "spirited, deftly-plotted and absorbing" and The Kansas City Star called it "a well told story charged with action."

One dissenting review came from The Tennessean, which described it as "an indifferent piece of work" in which "the style is a bit over-frescoed, and the characterization is stilted."

The United States had recently entered the Second World War and Fletcher herself commented, when promoting the book, that the public was likely to recognize the emotions of the present era in her depiction of the 18th century American colonies. The Sanford Herald wrote that contemporary audiences might find some catharsis in Men of Albemarle: "Back of all the history and fiction woven into this long novel there is one dominant idea: freedom, the kind of freedom men are fighting for in 1942." The Sacramento Union likewise found timely inspiration in the novel: "Religious dissension, political strife and Indian warfare stir the country, but the men of Albemarle stand firmly for liberty and justice." Emily Haswell of The Los Angeles Times agreed that "one is reminded on every page that all times are one time; and one is sent hurrying back to some of the most fascinating pages in American history."
