= Lange Lewis =

American author (1915–2003)

- Lewis in 1942
- Born: Jane de Lange Lewis; September 10, 1915; Oakland, California, U.S.
- Died: February 1, 2003 (aged 87)
- Education: University of Southern California
- Years active: 1942–1979
- Spouses: William Mansfield Beynon (m. 1940, divorced) Malcolm Havens Bissell Jr. (m. 1944; div. 1948) George A. Brandt (m. 1952; div. 1964)

Jane de Lange Lewis (September 10, 1915 – February 1, 2003), known by her pen names Lange Lewis, Jane Beynon and Jane Lewis Brandt, was an American author. She graduated from the University of Southern California (USC) in 1939 and began writing mystery novels, the first two of which – Murder Among Friends and Juliet Dies Twice – were set at a fictional university standing in for USC. She wrote three other books in the series, which followed a fictional lieutenant in the Los Angeles Police Department, Richard Tuck: Meat for Murder, The Birthday Murder and The Passionate Victims.

Under her married name Jane Beynon, Lewis published the novel Cypress Man. Following a time teaching in Mexico City, she published two historical romances, Love in the Hot-Eye Country and La Chingada. Although she is largely obscure in the modern day, her books received generally positive reviews from critics at the time.

== Early life ==
Lewis was born Jane de Lange Lewis on September 10, 1915, in Oakland, California. Her father was Arthur Munroe Lewis and her mother was Jennie Clark de Lange, both artists who met at a boarding house in Manhattan, New York, and married in 1911 before moving back to Oakland, her father's hometown, prior to Lewis's birth. Her father had worked for the San Francisco Chronicle in its art department and became a magazine illustrator in Oakland. The family moved to Berkeley and Los Angeles before returning to New York during the 1920s, where her father worked as a marine painter. He died in 1931 and Lewis moved back to Los Angeles with her mother, where she graduated from Los Angeles High School in 1935. At school, she was active in the philomathian society and the poetry club, publishing a poem in her senior yearbook. Lewis attended the University of Southern California (USC), where she joined the women's literary society, before graduating with Phi Beta Kappa honors in 1939.

== Career ==
After graduation, Lewis began working as a sales associate and a bank teller. The next year, on October 17, 1940, she married William Mansfield Beynon, a newspaper artist. He was drafted in November 1942 to fight in World War II and the couple ultimately separated, although Lewis used her married name until at least March 1944. During this time, she published her first novel Murder Among Friends on August 1, 1942, under the pen name Lange Lewis. The novel established the character of Richard Tuck, a lieutenant in the Los Angeles Police Department's homicide squad. Tuck, who was noted for refusing to arrest suspects without sufficient evidence, reappeared in four subsequent novels of Lewis's. The first novel follows an investigation into the murder of a secretary, whose body is discovered at the university medical school, and the group of medical students who serve as the suspects. It received praise from critics in the San Francisco Chronicle, The New York Times, and the Oakland Tribune. It is described in The Sacramento Bee as "smoothly written" and commended for its convincing solution. The novel was published in London in 1950 by Bodley Head.

Following her separation from Beynon, Lewis worked as a departmental secretary for USC, while she lived in an apartment near campus. She published Juliet Dies Twice on February 15, 1943, which once again follows Tuck investigating a murder at a university, named Southwest University but considered a stand-in for USC. It was described by critic Anthony Boucher as "for USC alumni a grand roman à clef, for others that rarest of mysteries—a really good novel with a university setting." The plot follows students in the university drama department after a graduate student portraying Juliet in a performance of Romeo and Juliet is found dead. It received a positive review from author Dorothy B. Hughes in her column for The Albuquerque Tribune, who commented that she wished she had written the novel. The novel was published in London in 1948. Lewis also published Meat for Murder in 1943, which focuses on the murder of a Hollywood set designer who hired two young writers to assist him with a movie script. The Oakland Tribune commended the novel for its "tangy brew of mystery with more than a dash of satire".

Around this time, Lewis met Malcolm Havens Bissell Jr., who worked for the Associated Press in Latin America as a reporter and photographer. The couple married at Fort Ord in Monterey County, California, in 1944. In March 1944, Lewis published her fourth book, Cypress Man, under the name Jane Beynon. The novel is a study of the psychological circumstances that could lead to a shooting. It received mixed reviews, with the Chicago Tribune and The Salt Lake Tribune criticizing the focus of the plot for not explaining the character of the murderer in a convincing way. She returned to her books about Tuck in 1945, publishing The Birthday Murder about a famous movie director who was murdered in the same way as described in his wife's books. It received a starred review from A Catalogue of Crime and was reprinted by Garland Publishing in its series "Fifty Classics of Crime Fiction, 1900–1950".

Lewis and Bissell worked together on "Murder in Acapulco," a mystery story published in second issue of the magazine Avon Detective Mysteries in 1947. The story follows an American journalist who becomes involved in a murder on the Mexican Riviera. The couple had a daughter, Haven Jean Bissell, on February 6, 1945. Bissell was in the U.S. Army until October 1945, when he was discharged following an illness. They planned to build a house in Los Gatos, California. The couple divorced in 1948.

Lewis published her last book about Tuck in 1952, The Passionate Victims. The novel focuses on the six year old murder of a student at Hollywood High School, which has been described by The Birmingham News as "interesting, but in spots far-fetched". The novel was published in London in 1953. Lewis remarried on August 5, 1952, to George A. Brandt. The couple moved to Mexico City and she worked at Colegio Coronet Hall as a teacher between 1953 and 1959. They moved back to California and ultimately divorced in 1964. She edited the feminist newspaper Woman West with Gail Winston Hammond for six months prior to its dissolution in 1970, which focused on satire and poetry and was published in South Pasadena, California. She also published a number of short stories around this time.

In 1975, she published her first historical romance with Bantam Books under the name Jane Lewis Brandt, titled Love in the Hot-Eye Country. The novel is set in Mexico and follows a middle-aged widow and a grifter. Her second historical novel, La Chingada, published on September 1, 1979, was more successful. It focuses on La Malinche, a Nahua woman in the 16th century who travelled with Spanish conquistador Hernán Cortés as a translator and concubine. The story is told from the perspective of Malinche and a young soldier Arturo Mondrayon. It was described in reviews as "meticulously researched" and "history as it should be novelized". However it has been criticized for its characterization of Malinche, choosing to portray her as a frivolous lover. The novel was translated into Spanish, as Malinche.

== Death and legacy ==
Lewis continued to live in the San Fernando Valley until her death on February 1, 2003, at the age of 87. Although she has become largely obscure in the modern day, she received generally positive contemporary reviews for her books and was compared by Boucher to the writer Margaret Millar. She often wrote about female characters and a character who appears aside Tuck in three of her novels, Murder Among Friends, Meat for Murder and The Passionate Victims, Briget Estees may have been the first female homicide investigator in an American crime novel due to her first appearance in 1942.

== Works ==
- Lewis, Lange (1942). Murder Among Friends. Indianapolis: Bobbs-Merrill Company.
- Lewis, Lange (1943). Juliet Dies Twice. Indianapolis: Bobbs-Merrill Company.
- Lewis, Lange (1943). Meat for Murder. Indianapolis: Bobbs-Merrill Company.
- Beynon, Jane (1944). Cypress Man. Indianapolis: Bobbs-Merrill Company.
- Lewis, Lange (1945). The Birthday Murder. Indianapolis: Bobbs-Merrill Company.
- Lewis, Lange (1952). The Passionate Victim. Indianapolis: Bobbs-Merrill Company.
- Brandt, Jane Lewis (1975). Love in the Hot-Eye Country. New York: Bantam Books.
- Brandt, Jane Lewis (1979). La Chingada. New York: McGraw-Hill. ISBN 9780070072169.
