= Paul Laune =

American painter

Paul Sidney Laune (1899 in Woodward, Oklahoma – 1977) was a writer, painter and illustrator, known for his book covers and for paintings he did of rural Western U.S. pioneer scenes. He covered pioneers, ranch-life, quarter horses in his paintings. He painted five murals for the Plains Indians and Pioneers Museum in his hometown of Woodward, Oklahoma.

After graduating from the University of Oklahoma, Laune worked as an illustrator and art critic in New York. He also lived in Phoenix, Arizona, where he drew quarter horses and wrote a book on them.

Among the more famous works he illustrated, were books in the Hardy Boys Mystery Series.

== Works ==
- The Forgotten Books Of Eden. Illustrations, 1930.
- The Secret Warning. Hardy Boys Mystery Series, illustrations, 1938
- The Thirsty Pony, author, cover art and illustrations, 1940
- The Clue of the Broken Blade. Hardy Boys Mystery Series #21, illustrator, 1942
- The Flickering Torch Mystery. Hardy Boys Mystery Series #22, illustrator
- Toil of the Brave by Inglis Fletcher, dust jacket art, 1946
- The Mustang Roundup, author
- Bennett's Welcome by Inglis Fletcher, dust jacket art, 1950
- Queen's Gift by Inglis Fletcher, dust jacket art, 1952
- The Silver Chalice, illustrations, 1952
- Southwest, John Houghton Allen, 1952
- Wicked Lady by Inglis Fletcher, dust jacket art, 1962
- When the Legends Die, book cover, 1963
- America's Quarter Horses, author, 1977
