= Cormorant's Brood =

1957 American novel by Inglis Fletcher

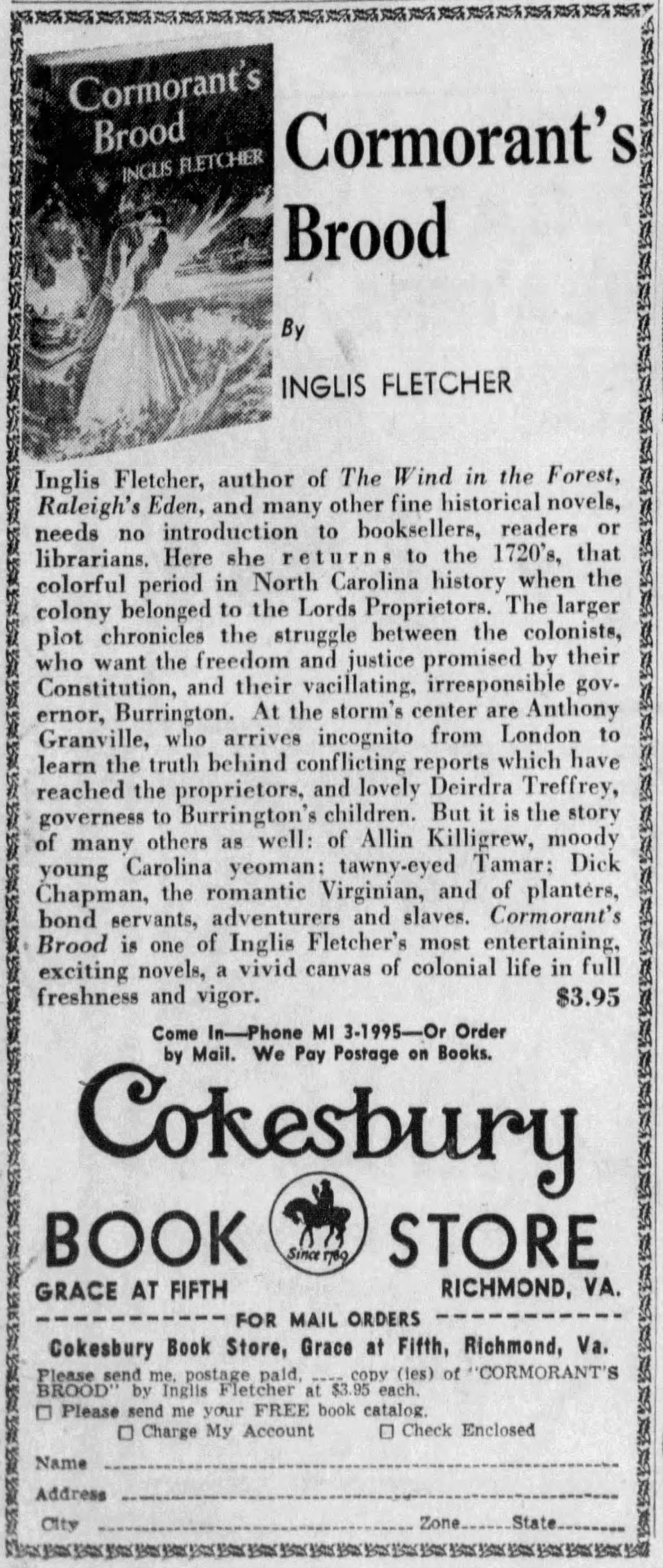
- Newspaper advertisement for Cormorant's Brood, published in the December 20, 1959, edition of the Richmond Times-Dispatch.
- Author: Inglis Fletcher
- Language: English
- Publisher: J. B. Lippincott
- Publication date: 1959
- Publication place: United States
- Media type: Print (hardcover)
- Pages: 345

Cormorant's Brood is an American historical romance novel by Inglis Fletcher first published in August, 1959. It is the ninth title in Fletcher's "Carolina series" and, as with her previous works, depicts a mix of historical and fictional events in and around the real town of Edenton, North Carolina. To date, it was the shortest of her Carolina novels. Fletcher described the novel as one "with no real hero or heroine, a novel about a quiet time, in which there were neither battles nor war."

Fletcher, a long-time resident of Edenton, was able to access extensive, locally-available historical records when conducting research for the Carolina Series books, using "the 'Colonial Records of North Carolina' to authenticate her background." She also maintained a large personal reference library at her home, the historic Bandon plantation. She reported that, because of her extensive work writing about the South during the colonial period, Cormorant's Brood was easy to write and that she "needed only to pinpoint the actual events of the years" in which it is set.

== Plot ==
The action takes place over the years 1723 to 1929. Anthony Dawson arrives in Edenton to oversee landholdings on behalf of a Palatine of the Lords Proprietors. He immediately finds himself swept up in the corrupt political climate overseen by Governor Burrington. A romantic triangle develops between Anthony, the Burrington family's governess Dierdra Taffrey, and yeoman farmer Allin Killigrew; a romance between Allin's sister Tamar and Anthony's friend Richard Chapman also develops.

The "cormorant's brood" of the title are the corrupt British governors installed in the colonies.

== Publication ==
As with most of Fletcher's novels, the first edition hardcover edition featured a dustjacket illustrated by Paul Laune.

It was reported by the Winston-Salem Journal that the publication of Cormorant's Brood had been "held up due to publication difficulties;" in the interim, Fletcher published Pay, Pack, and Follow, a memoir. Fletcher promoted the book locally at events Norfolk, Richmond, and Winston-Salem in the fall of 1959. 1500 copies of the book's first printing were made available on August 24, 1959, as a "limited autographed Edenton edition."

The novel was reissued in paperback in 1975 by Bantam Books.

== Reception ==
Reviews for Cormorant's Brood were positive, with most reviewers describing the novel as being in line with the structure and quality of Fletcher's previous work. Richard Walser, an academic who was also a biographer of Fletcher's and long-time booster of her work, called the novel "one of the best and one of the most tempestuous of the impressive Carolina Series." Robert Marks, writing for The High Point Enterprise, called it "a story which many fans of Inglis Fletcher will enjoy." Writing for the Richmond Times-Dispatch, Hilda N. Schroetter said: "Mrs. Fletcher's evocative style can always capture the spirit of the reader, as well as the spirit of her novel's setting. Once more, in 'Cormorant's Brood' the breeze blows briskly from the Edenton harbor. And the breeze is as fresh and vigorous as ever."

In her more tempered review for The Baltimore Sun, Adelaide C. Rackemann said: "It is a tribute to Mrs. Fletcher that, even if not highly original, none of it seems silly. Furthermore, since the main political events in the story are true, reading 'Cormorant's Brood' can be, for many people, a painless way of absorbing some American history." The Virginian-Pilot described it as "fast moving, vibrant with life and color," attesting that "it faithfully follows history," but that its "numerous characters lack the force, depth and sensitivity which have characterized other works of Mrs. Fletcher's." Mary B. Morris, writing for The Roanoke Times, opined that it "cannot be called one of the best of her novels," but found it to be "eminently readable." Margaret Nordholm, writing in The Courier of Waterloo and Cedar Falls, called Cormorant's Brood "run of the mill historical stuff."
