= Roanoke Hundred =

1948 American novel by Inglis Fletcher

- Author: Inglis Fletcher
- Language: English
- Publisher: Bobbs-Merrill
- Publication date: October 18, 1948
- Publication place: United States
- Media type: Print (hardcover)
- Pages: 492

Roanoke Hundred is a 1948 American historical novel by Inglis Fletcher and is the fifth of her twelve "Carolina Series" of novels depicting events in and around North Carolina before to the American Revolutionary War.

As the title would suggest, Roanoke Hundred depicts the founding of the Roanoke Colony. Its setting in 1585 makes it the earliest-set Carolina Series novel. Because of this, it is sometimes described as the first novel in the series, even though it was neither the first written nor published title.

== Plot ==
Sir Richard Grenville, an English landowner and cousin of Walter Raleigh, leads 108 men on a voyage to the Americas, where they establish the Roanoke Colony.

== Development ==
Fletcher, whose writing process was known to include detailed research, made a research trip to England in 1947 "to get basic material for Roanoke Hundred." She traveled to Devon and Cornwall, as well as to the British Museum in London, in search of historical documentation, ultimately compiling biographical information on 75 of the 108 members of the Roanoke Colony.

== Publication ==
Initial publication of Roanoke Hundred occurred in the fall of 1948, including in a special signed "Carolina Edition" that was available for pre-order. It was serialized in the Philadelphia Inquirer, New York Post-Home News, and Canada Wide Feature in 1949. It was republished in paperback by Permabooks (#P151) in 1951 and 1952. For reissues by Bantam (released in March and October 1972, October 1973, January 1976, and April 1980) it was marketed as the "first" novel in the series based on chronology.

== Reception ==
The novel received positive reviews, with critics commending Fletcher's ability to bring historical personages to life in her writing. Fletcher's depiction of Elizabethan England was praised and compared to the writings of Harrison Ainsworth.
