= Flora MacDonald =

Scottish Jacobite heroine

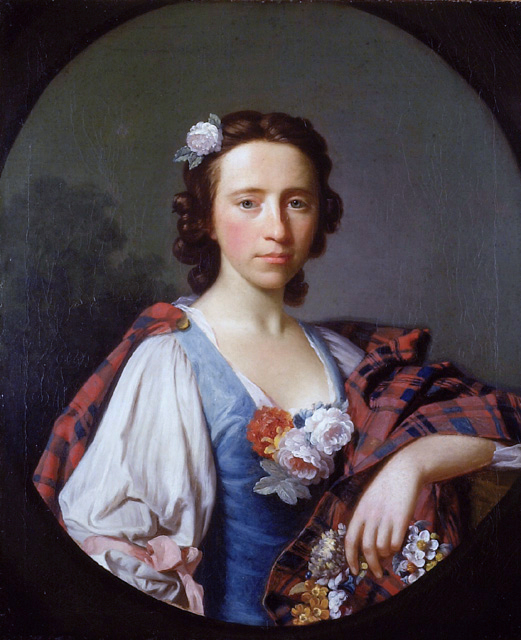
- Flora Macdonald by Allan Ramsay c. 1749–1750; the roses are a Jacobite symbol. Ashmolean Museum, Oxford.
- Born: 1722; Milton, South Uist, Scotland
- Died: 5 March 1790 (aged 68); Kingsburgh, Skye
- Known for: Assisting the escape of Charles Edward Stuart

Flora MacDonald (Note: Scottish Gaelic: Fionnghal nic Dhòmhnaill) (1722 – 5 March 1790) was a member of the minor gentry from the Outer Hebrides. She is best known for helping Charles Edward Stuart evade government troops after the Battle of Culloden in April 1746, which ended the 1745 Rising. MacDonald later claimed to have assisted Charles out of sympathy for his situation, rather than support for the Jacobite cause.

Arrested and held in the Tower of London, she was released under a general amnesty in June 1747. She later married Allan MacDonald and the couple emigrated to North Carolina in 1773. Their support for the British government during the American War of Independence meant the loss of their American estates and they returned to Scotland, where she died in 1790.

== Early life ==
MacDonald was born in 1722 at Milton on South Uist in the Outer Hebrides, third and last child of Ranald MacDonald (d. 1723) and his second wife, Marion. Her father was a member of the minor gentry of Clan MacDonald of Clanranald, being tacksman and leaseholder of Milton and Balivanich. She had two brothers, Angus, who later inherited the Milton tack, and Ronald, who died young.

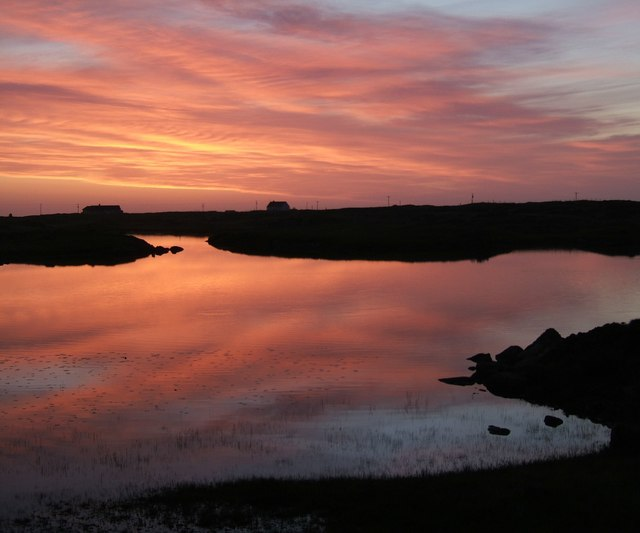
Sunset on South Uist, where MacDonald was born in 1722

Particularly in the Hebrides, elements of the Clan Donald adhered to the Catholic Church, but MacDonald came from South Uist's Protestant minority. According to Scottish Episcopal Church Bishop Robert Forbes, "Miss MacDonald is Protestant, and is descended from the family of Clanranald by her father, and of an Episcopal clergyman by her mother."

Through her uncle Maighstir Alasdair MacDhòmhnaill, Episcopalian rector of Kilchoan and a Clanranald tacksman of Dalilea, Moidart, she was first cousin to poet Alasdair mac Mhaighstir Alasdair

Her father died soon after her birth and in 1728 her mother married again, this time to Hugh MacDonald, tacksman of Armadale, Isle of Skye. MacDonald was brought up by her father's cousin, Sir Alexander MacDonald, chief of Clan Macdonald of Sleat. Suggestions she was educated in Edinburgh cannot be confirmed.

On 6 November 1750, she married Allan MacDonald, a captain in the British Army whose father was Sir Alexander's steward, and tacksman of Kingsburgh, Skye. They had seven surviving children, two daughters and five sons, two of whom were lost at sea in 1781 and 1782; a third son John made his fortune in India, enabling his parents to spend their last years in some comfort.

== The escape of Prince Charles Edward Stuart ==
MacDonald was visiting Benbecula in the Outer Hebrides when Prince Charles and a small group of aides took refuge there after the Battle of Culloden in June 1746. One of his companions, Félix O'Neille y O'Neille, was a distant relative of MacDonald, and asked for her help. Benbecula was controlled by a pro-government Independent Highland Company commanded by MacDonald's step-father, Hugh MacDonald. This connection allowed her to obtain the necessary permits but she apparently hesitated, fearing the consequences for her family if they were caught. She may have been taking less of a risk than it appears, since witnesses later claimed Hugh advised the Prince where to hide from his search parties.

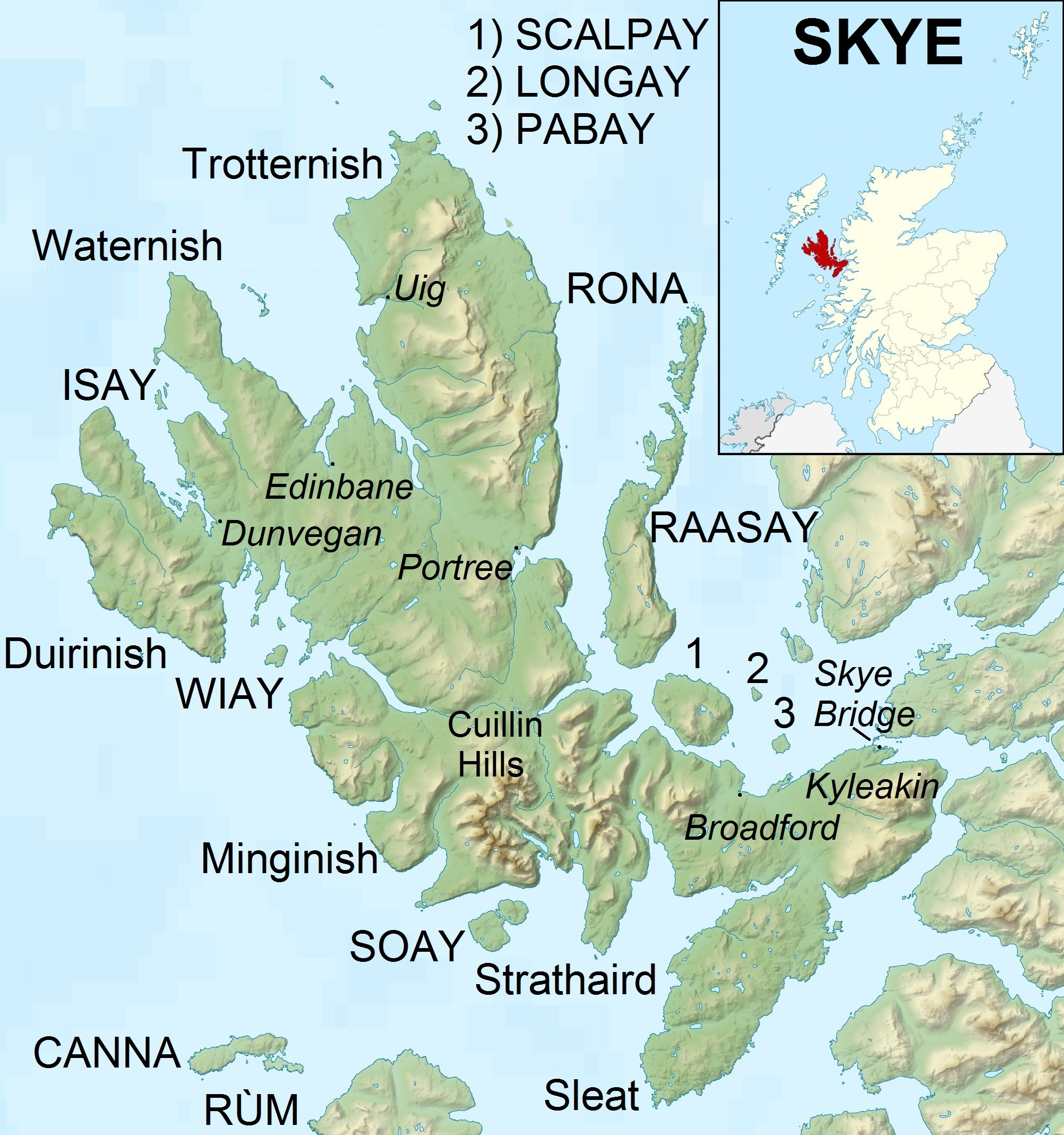
Islands of Skye and Raasay, Portree mid-left

Passes were issued allowing passage to the mainland for MacDonald, and a party of eight, including Charles disguised as an Irish maid called Betty Burke. On 27 June, they landed near Sir Alexander's house at Monkstadt, near Uig, Snizort. In his absence, his wife Lady Margaret arranged lodging with her steward, who told Charles to remove his disguise, as it simply made him more conspicuous. The next day, the Prince was taken from Portree to the island of Raasay, while MacDonald remained on Skye.

MacDonald was subsequently arrested and imprisoned in the Tower of London. After Lady Margaret interceded on her behalf with the chief Scottish legal officer, Duncan Forbes, she was allowed to live outside the Tower under the supervision of a "King's Messenger", and released after the June 1747 Act of Indemnity. Aristocratic sympathisers collected over £1,500 for her, one of the contributors being Frederick, Prince of Wales. She allegedly told Frederick she helped Charles out of charity, and would have done the same for him.

== Emigration to North Carolina ==
Following their marriage in 1750, MacDonald and her husband Allan lived at Flodigarry on Skye. Allan served in the 114th and 62nd Regiments of Foot during the 1756 to 1763 Seven Years' War, and inherited Kingsburgh when his father died in 1772. The couple was visited here by poet, essayist, and lexicographer Dr Samuel Johnson in 1773, (Note: Johnson, who claimed to have Jacobite sympathies, asked to meet Flora, and described her as "a woman of soft features, gentle manners, kind soul and elegant presence") whose words were later inscribed on her memorial at Kilmuir: "a name that will be mentioned in history, and if courage and fidelity be virtues, mentioned with honour".

However, a series of poor harvests and increasingly high rents resulted in what Johnson described as an "epidemic desire of wandering" throughout the Highlands in general. At the time of his visit in 1773, more than 800 people from the Sleat lands were preparing to emigrate to North America, and in 1774 MacDonald and her husband moved to Anson County, North Carolina. Along with other Clan Donald transplants, they settled near what is now Cameron Hill, on a plantation named "Killegray".

When the American Revolutionary War began in 1775, Allan raised the Anson Battalion of the Loyalist North Carolina Militia, a total of around 1,000 men, including their sons Alexander and James. They then set off for the coast to link up with some 2,000 British reinforcements commanded by General Henry Clinton, who in reality had only just left Cork in Ireland. Early on the morning of 27 February, they were ambushed at Moore's Creek Bridge by Patriot militia led by Richard Caswell and along with his troops, Allan MacDonald was taken prisoner.

After the battle, MacDonald was interrogated by the local Committee of Safety. In April 1777, all Loyalist-owned property was confiscated and the MacDonalds were evicted from Killegray, losing all their possessions. After 18 months in captivity, Allan was released as part of a prisoner exchange in September 1777 and posted to Fort Edward, Nova Scotia as commander of the 84th Regiment of Foot. He was joined here by his wife in August 1778.

== Return to Skye ==
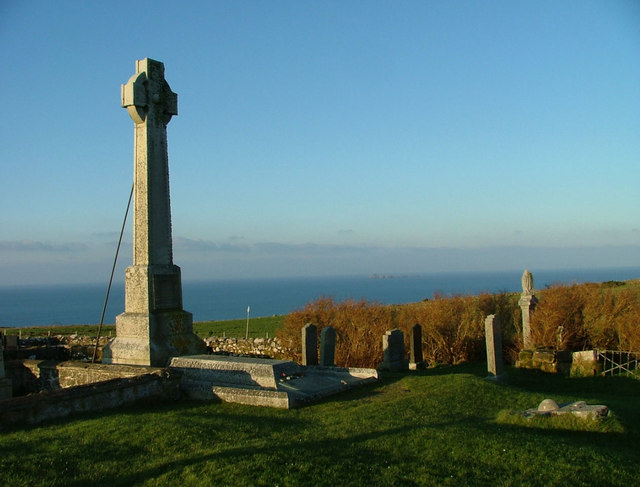
MacDonald's grave in Kilmuir Cemetery, Skye

After a harsh winter in Halifax, Nova Scotia, in September 1779 MacDonald took passage for London in the Dunmore, a British privateer; during the voyage, she broke her arm and ill-health delayed her return to Scotland until spring 1780. She spent the next few years living with various family members, including the Dunvegan home of her son-in-law Major General Alexander MacLeod, the largest landowner in Skye after the MacDonalds.

The compensation received for the loss of their property in North Carolina was insufficient to allow them to resettle in Nova Scotia and Allan returned to Scotland in 1784. Kingsburgh was now occupied by MacDonald's half-sister and her husband, and Allan instead took up tenant farming in nearby Penduin. She died in 1790 at the age of 68 and was buried in Kilmuir Cemetery, followed by her husband in September 1792.

== Legacy ==
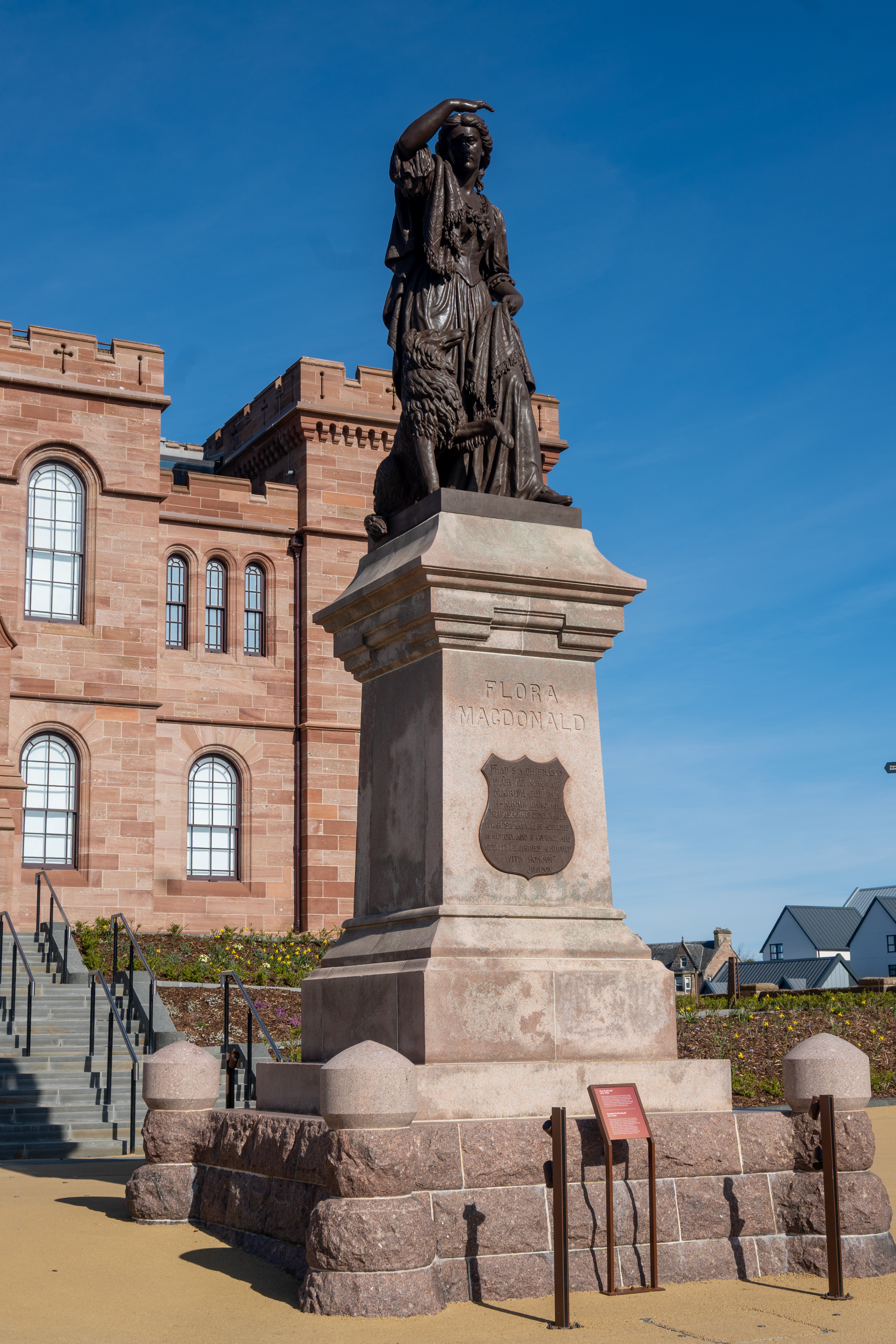
1896 statue, Inverness Castle

=== Scholarly interpretation and historical memory ===
Traditional portrayals of the escape focus on Charles, with MacDonald relegated to a secondary role. She herself rarely spoke of the episode, and her last contact with the Prince was when they parted ways at Portree. It appears her assistance was at least partly driven by fears his continued presence would endanger her family.

Scholars of Scottish Gaelic literature argue English-language versions fail to recognise Macdonald was only one of many people who assisted Charles after Culloden. MacDonald herself rarely referred to the episode in later life, and made no attempt to highlight her own role, although Gaelic poet Niall mac Eachainn criticised her for allegedly trying to win favour from both Stuarts and Hanoverians, while contrasting his own continuing loyalty to the Jacobite cause.

During the Victorian era, influenced in part the novels of Sir Walter Scott, a romanticized Scottish cultural identity emerged that elevated figures like Mary, Queen of Scots and Prince Charles. In 1878, an alleged "Autobiography" was published by her granddaughter Flora Frances Wylde, which contains so many mistakes that it could not have been written by MacDonald. These errors were repeated by Charles Ewald in his 1886 book The Life and Times of Prince Charles Edward, which remains the basis for many popular perspectives on her life and motivations.

=== Monuments and institutional commemoration ===
Flora MacDonald was painted several times by the Scottish portrait artist Allan Ramsay (1713–1784). The best-known portrait, reproduced in this article, was completed after her release in 1749–1750. In 2015, a previously unrecorded painting, allegedly also by Ramsay, was discovered in Florida.

A bronze statue was erected at Inverness Castle in 1899, with her dog Flossie by her side. This was soon followed by the first performance of the Scottish highland dance known as Flora MacDonald's Fancy.

The Flora MacDonald Academy, formerly Flora MacDonald College, in Red Springs, North Carolina is named for her. Two of her children are interred on the campus. Until 2007, it was also the site of the Flora Macdonald Highland Games.

=== In popular culture ===
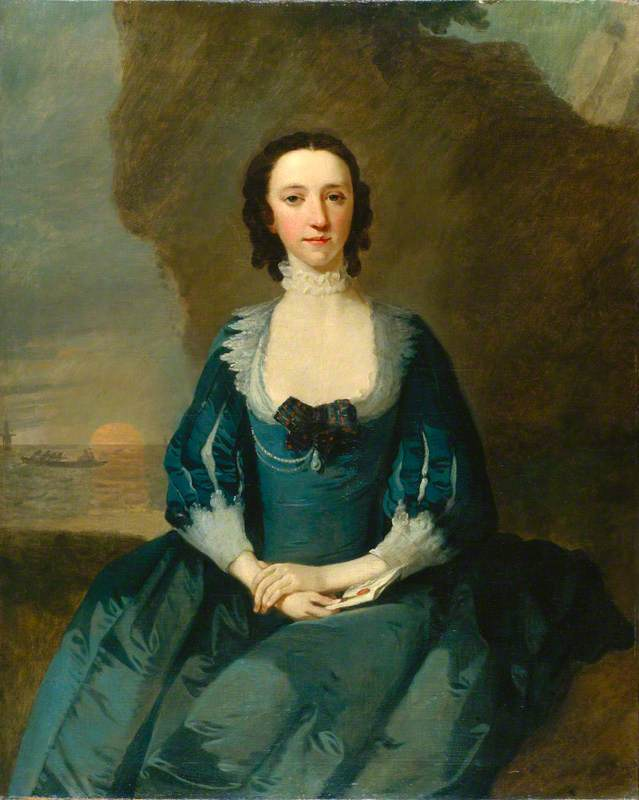
Portrait of Flora MacDonald by Richard Wilson, 1747

==== English literature ====
In 1954, Inglis Fletcher, published The Scotswoman, a novel based on MacDonald's life in North Carolina during the American War of Independence.

==== Film and television ====
In the 1948 film Bonnie Prince Charlie, MacDonald is portrayed by Margaret Leighton, with David Niven as Prince Charles. Niven later recalled the film as "...one of those huge, florid extravaganzas that reek of disaster from the start."

MacDonald was played by Shauna Macdonald in the Outlander television series, season six, episode five.

==== Music ====
In 1884, Sir Harold Boulton composed English lyrics to Cuachag nan Craobh (Note: "Cuckoo of the Trees"), a lament written by 18th-century Gaelic poet William Ross about his unrequited love for noblewoman Marion Ross. Published under the title The Skye Boat Song, Boulton's lyrics focus instead upon Prince Charles' escape to Skye, and proved extremely popular.

== Sources ==
- Bate, W Jackson (1955). The Achievement of Samuel Johnson. OUP. ISBN 978-0195004762.
- Douglas, Hugh (2004). "Flora MacDonald". Oxford Dictionary of National Biography (online ed.). Oxford University Press. doi:10.1093/ref:odnb/17432. (Subscription, Wikipedia Library access or UK public library membership required.)
- Fraser, Flora (2022). Pretty Young Rebel: The Life of Flora Macdonald. Bloomsbury. ISBN 978-1408879825.
- MacInnes, John (1899). The Brave Sons of Skye; Containing the Military Records (compiled From Authentic Sources) of the Leading Officers, Non-Commissioned Officers, and private soldiers whom "Eilean a' Cheo" has produced. Eyre and Spottiswood.
- MacLeod, Ruairidh (1985). Flora MacDonald: The Jacobite Heroine in Scotland and North America. Shepheard-Walwyn. ISBN 978-0856831478.
- MacGregor, Alexander (December 2009). The life of Flora Macdonald, and her adventures with Prince Charles (Print On Demand ed.). Nabu Press.
- McConnell, Brian (30 November 2014). "A Highlander & Loyalist – Alan MacDonald" (PDF). UE.org.
- Meyer, Duane (1963). The Highland Scots of North Carolina. Raleigh, N.C.: Carolina Charter Tercentenary Commission.
- Morris, RJ (1992). "Victorian Values in Scotland & England". Proceedings of the British Academy (78).
- Newton, Michael (2001). We're Indians Sure Enough: The Legacy of the Scottish Highlanders in the United States. Saorsa Media.
- Quynn, Dorothy Mackay (July 1941). "Flora MacDonald in History". The North Carolina Historical Review. 18 (3): 236–258. JSTOR 23516055.
- Riding, Jacqueline (2016). Jacobites; A New History of the 45 Rebellion. Bloomsbury. ISBN 978-1408819128.
- Thomson, Derek, ed. (1983). The Companion to Gaelic Scotland. Blackwell. ISBN 9780631155782.
