= Flora Frances Wylde =

- Born: 1812
- Died: November 27, 1888; Cheltenham
- Occupations: Novelist, editor
- Parents: John Macdonald (father); Frances Maria Chambers (mother)

Flora Frances Wylde (1812 – 27 November 1888) was a Scottish novelist best known for her fictionalized autobiography of her grandmother, Jacobite heroine Flora MacDonald.

== Early life ==
She was born Flora Frances in 1812. She was the eighth of nine children of Lieutenant Colonel John MacDonald, the last surviving son of Flora MacDonald, and Frances Maria Chambers, daughter of Robert Chambers, Chief Justice of the Supreme Court of Judicature at Fort William in Bengal. She was the last surviving granddaughter of MacDonald. She married Edward Randyll Wylde of the Royal Navy.

== Career ==
She began writing novels following the 1853 death of her husband. Her first was The Tablette Booke of Ladye Mary Keyes (1861), a fictionalized journal by Lady Mary Grey, sister of Lady Jane Grey, which imitated period spelling and grammar. Her The Autobiography of Flora MacDonald (1870) has been criticized for its inaccuracies. MacDonald's twentieth century biographer, Hugh Douglas, wrote that Wylde's "work was so full of fancy and errors of fact that it should not have been taken seriously even at the time, but, alas, it was." Wylde's next book was another fictional autobiography, of the 200 year life of a tortoise named Totty Testudo. Her The Widow Unmasked (1875) was a domestic romance.

== Death ==
Flora Wylde died on 27 November 1888 in Cheltenham.

== Bibliography ==
- The Tablette Booke of Ladye Mary Keyes, Owne Sister to the Misfortunate Ladye Jane Dudlie: In Wiche wille be founde a faithfulle Historie of alle the Troubels that did com to them and theire Kinsfolke, writt in the Yeare of Oure Lorde Fifteene Hundred and Seventie-seven. 1 vol. London: Saunders and Otley, 1861.
- The Autobiography of Flora MacDonald, Being the Home of a Heroine. Edinburgh: W. P. Nimmo, 1870.
- The Life and Wonderful Adventures of "Totty Testudo": An Autobiography. 1 vol. Edinburgh: W. P. Nimmo, 1873.
- The Widow Unmasked: or, The Firebrand in the Family. A Novel. 3 vol. London: Samuel Tinsley, 1875.
