= Portrait of Flora MacDonald =

Painting by Richard Wilson

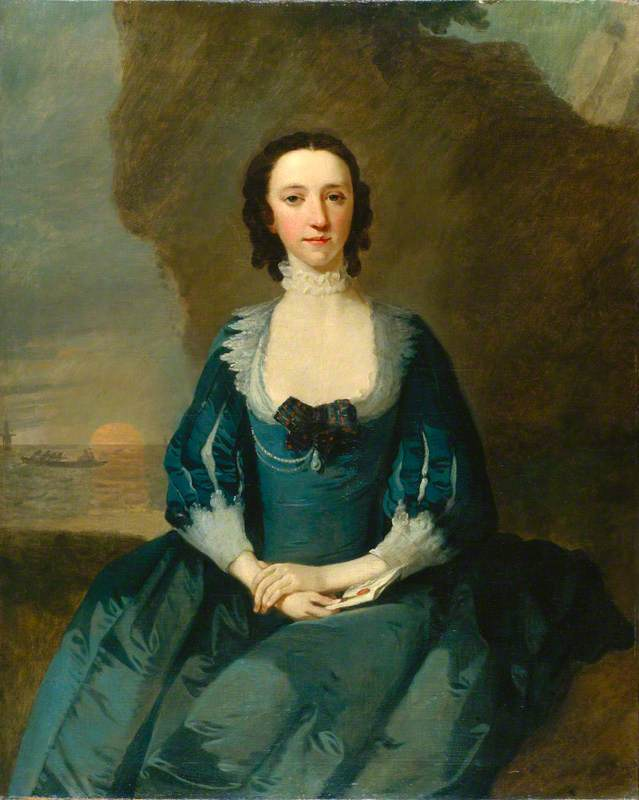
- Artist: Richard Wilson
- Year: 1747
- Type: Oil on canvas, portrait painting
- Medium: oil paint, canvas
- Dimensions: 117 cm × 93.3 cm (46 in × 36.7 in); 117.0 cm (46.1 in) × 93.3 cm (36.7 in)
- Location: National Portrait Gallery, National Portrait Gallery, London
- Accession: NPG 5848

Portrait of Flora MacDonald is a 1747 portrait painting by the British artist Richard Wilson. It depicts the Scottish Jacobite Flora MacDonald.

== Description ==
During the latter stages of the unsuccessful Jacobite Rising of 1745, Flora MacDonald assisted Charles Edward Stuart to escape. Her role made her a popular celebrity in Britain. She later emigrated to North Carolina in the United States, where she supported the Loyalist cause in the American War of Independence. It was painted shortly after she was released from the Tower of London and shows her wearing tartan bow with a backdrop that appears to show the royal escape.

As the Welsh Wilson was from a strongly Whig family it was unlikely that his painting reflected any personal sympathy with Jacobitism, rather than portaging a popular subject. Early in his career the artist produced a number of portraits. Wilson then travelled to Italy, and specialised entirely in landscapes on his return to Britain for which he is best known. Today the painting is in the collection of the National Portrait Gallery in London, which acquired it in 1985.

== Scottish National Portrait Gallery version ==
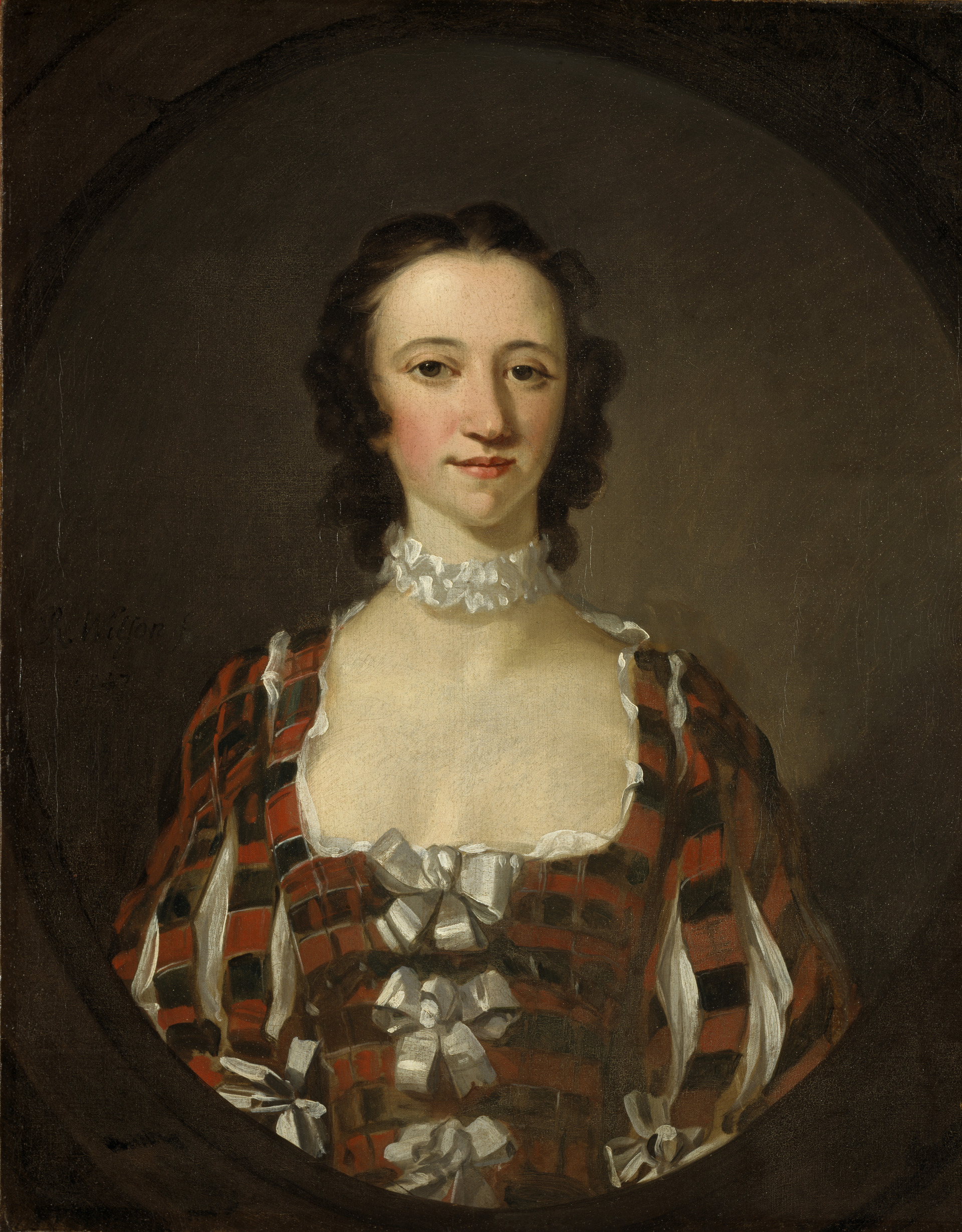
Version in the Scottish National Portrait Gallery

Another portrait of her by Wilson, dated the same year, is now in the Scottish National Portrait Gallery in Edinburgh. A smaller, oval-shaped portrait without the backdrop, it shows her more clearly clad in tartan.

== Bibliography ==
- Fraser, Flora. Pretty Young Rebel: The Life of Flora Macdonald. Bloomsbury Publishing, 2023.
- Lord, Peter. The Tradition: A New History of Welsh Art 1400–1990. Parthian Books, 2023.
- Solkin, David H. Richard Wilson: The Landscape of Reaction. Tate Gallery, 1982
