= Wicked =

Wicked may refer to:

== Books ==
- Wicked (Maguire novel), a 1995 novel by Gregory Maguire that inspired the musical of the same name
- Wicked, a 1997 novel series collaboration between Australian children's authors Paul Jennings and Morris Gleitzman
- Wicked (novel series), a young adult novel series by Nancy Holder and Debbie Viguié
- Wicked!, a 2006 novel by Jilly Cooper
- Wicked (Pretty Little Liars), a 2008 young adult novel in the Sara Shepard series

== Film, television and stage ==
- Wicked (1931 film), a drama film starring Bailey Morley and Victor McLaglen
- Wicked, Wicked, a 1973 horror-thriller feature film that was presented in "Duo-Vision"
- The Wicked (1991 film), Italian film directed by Carlo Lizzani
- Wicked (1998 film), a 1998 film starring Julia Stiles
- Wicked! (TV series), a 2000 Australian animated series
- Wicked (musical), a 2003 musical based on the Gregory Maguire novel
- Wicked (film franchise), a media franchise based on the two-part film adaptation of the musical
  - Wicked (2024 film), the first of the two-part film adaptation of the musical
  - Wicked: For Good, the second of the two-part film adaptation of the musical
  - Wicked: One Wonderful Night, a television special for the second movie
- The Wicked (2013 film), American film directed by Peter Winther
- "The Wicked" (The Amazing World of Gumball), a television episode

== Music ==
=== Albums ===
- Wicked (Barb Jungr and Michael Parker album), 1986
- Wicked (Sinitta album), 1989
- Wicked! (Scooter album), 1996
- Wicked (Shemekia Copeland album), 2000
- Wicked (musical album), original Broadway cast recording, 2003
  - Wicked: The Soundtrack, from the film based on the stage musical, 2024
  - Wicked (score), from the film based on the stage musical, 2024
- Wicked (Twiztid album) or the title song, 2009

=== Songs ===
- "Wicked" (Ice Cube song), 1992
- "Wicked", by Symphony X from The Odyssey, 2002
- "Wicked", by Greg Dulli from Amber Headlights, 2005
- "Wicked", by Firebeatz and Schella, 2013
- "Wicked" (Future song), 2016
- "Wicked", by Lee Ann Womack from The Lonely, the Lonesome & the Gone, 2017
- "Wicked", by Trippie Redd from A Love Letter to You 3, 2018
- "WICKED", by ALLDAY PROJECT, 2023

== Other uses ==
- Wicked (comics), a minor character in the X-Men universe
- Wicked (roller coaster), a launched steel roller coaster located at Lagoon Amusement Park in Farmington, Utah
- Wicked (video game), developed by Binary Vision Ltd. and released on Amiga, Atari ST and Commodore 64 in 1989
- WICKED, a fictional organization in the novel and film series The Maze Runner

== See also ==
- Wicked Pictures, an American pornographic studio
- Wickedness
- Wicked problem
- The Wicked Lady (disambiguation)
