= Lusty Wind for Carolina =

1944 American novel by Inglis Fletcher

- Author: Inglis Fletcher
- Language: English
- Publisher: Bobbs-Merrill
- Publication date: 1944
- Publication place: United States
- Media type: Print (hardcover)
- Pages: 509

Lusty Wind for Carolina is a 1944 American historical novel by Inglis Fletcher. It was the third of her "Carolina Series" series of books. Later editions were printed in hardcover by The Blakiston Company (1945) and in paperback by Permabooks (1951) and Bantam (1970). It was also published in full as a "Star Weekly Complete Novel" by the Toronto Star Weekly on August 3, 1946.

Fletcher dedicated the novel to Vilhjalmur Stefansson.

== Development ==
Fletcher, whose work was respected for its historical detail, undertook a research trip to the Nassau Library on the Island of New Providence; the Rare Book Room of the Library of Congress; the State Historical Commission in Raleigh; the Duke University library; and the archives of the Chowan County Courthouse, near her home in Edenton. While writing Lusty Wind for Carolina, Fletcher spent some time at Clarendon Plantation, the Wilmington home of Margaret Walthour Lippitt (who is thanked in the book's acknowledgements). Fletcher also did much of her research for the book at the Wilmington Public Library in Wilmington, North Carolina. Two years after the book was published, Fletcher donated her original manuscript to the organization's archive. While staying in the U.S. capital, Fletcher took lodgings that were within walking distance from the Library of Congress; she and her husband made the trip in part because it afforded them the chance to spend more time with their son, who was pursuing post-graduate studies at the United States Naval Academy in Annapolis, Maryland.

== Plot ==
The Fontaines, a French Huguenot family, travel to the American Colonies to take over a land grant. Passing through the Caribbean, they encounter pirates at Nassau. Once settled along Cape Fear, the eldest daughter Gabrielle Fontaine begins to fall in love with the family's new hire, David Moray. A secondary romance between locals Molly Lepel and Michael Cary also develops. The actual historical figure Anne Bonny is prominently featured.

== Reception ==
Lusty Wind for Carolina received generally positive reviews and, as with her previous two Carolina novels, Fletcher was praised for her detailed depictions of period setting. A reviewer for The St. Louis Star-Times said it contained "poignant drama" "stirring action", and the Harding Field Echelon of Baton Rouge said it "rates high both as history and as pure entertainment." James A. Brown of the Asheville Citizen-Times wrote that Fletcher "has scored again with another costume romance." The reviewer for the Greensboro News & Record wrote that the book "does not quite measure up to Raleigh's Eden nor is it likely to be regarded as a great novel, but it is a rich and entertaining story."

A review of the Bantam paperback edition in early 1971 called it "a well-plotted book, with fierce action."
