= Raleighʻs Eden =

1940 American novel by Inglis Fletcher

Raleigh's Eden
- Author: Inglis Fletcher
- Language: English
- Publisher: Bobbs-Merrill
- Publication date: 23 September 1940
- Publication place: United States
- Media type: Print (hardcover)
- Pages: 662

Raleigh's Eden is a 1940 American historical novel by Inglis Fletcher, the first of her "Carolina Series" series; an additional eleven books in the series were published through 1952.

== Plot ==
The novel is set primarily in Edenton, along the Albemarle Sound, and in other nearby North Carolina locales, and takes place between the years 1765 and 1782. The plot follows fictional plantation owner Adam Rutledge who becomes romantically entangled with multiple female characters (including an "Arabian priestess slave-girl, Azizi") while becoming a major resistance fighter against real historical figures like governors Edmund Fanning and William Tryon. Rutledge's primary romantic interest is young married socialite Mary Warden, while both Adam and his cousin Peyton are seduced by Lady Caroline Clothilde, "a female pirate." Fictional characters are shown witnessing or participating in the Edenton Tea Party, the arrest of Herman Husband, and demonstrations against the Stamp Act; historical figures who are depicted include Nathanael Greene, Samuel Johnston, and Charles Cornwallis.

== Development ==
Fletcher began working on the novel in 1934 and was reportedly inspired to start researching the period while at a tea party at an unnamed historic venue in London; she also drew on stories her mother and grandmother had told her about Colonial North Carolina. She wrote most of the novel while living in San Francisco, relying on sources in from the Bancroft Library, the United States Army Library, and the California State Library; in the novel's foreword, she thanked Hollywood actor Randolph Scott as one of the individuals or institutions "who supplied data on early Virginia and North Carolina." She also made research trips to Edenton, conducting research at the Cupola House Museum, the vestry archives of St. Paul's Episcopal Church and other libraries in the area. The character of Azizi was inspired by her experiences living in North Africa.

== Publication ==
As with Fletcher's subsequent Carolina novels, Raleigh's Eden was first published by Bobbs-Merrill. A numbered, limited edition of the first Bobbs-Merrill impression, called the "North Carolina Edition," featured a special tip-in signed by both Fletcher and North Carolina Governor Clyde R. Hoey. By the fall of 1943, it was reported that Raleigh's Eden and its follow-up, the prequel Men of Albemarle, had been published in Britain and Sweden and had been translated into Swedish and Danish.

== Reception ==
The novel was well-received and benefited from a surge of interest in "patriotic" American literature, with the San Francisco Chronicle referring to it as "fraught with significance in its timeliness." Writing for the St. Louis Globe-Democrat, reviewer Charles C. Clayton described as a "stirring" novel that balanced its grand historical scope with relatable characters called it "a story which will give you a new respect for the men and women whose courage is our heritage." The Appleton Post-Crescent called it "pleasantly free of the prosy loquacity of most historical novels" in addition to being "genuinely worthwhile and intensely thrilling."

Despite admitting that the novel was "perhaps too long" and was "not quite" the best "historical novel as the year will provide," the reviewer for the Houston Post commended the accessibility and immediacy of Fletcher's writing, stating:

"It is as if Inglis Fletcher had picked up a great section of pre-Revolutionary North Carolina in her Raleigh's Eden and had moved it forward through time to the present. In the process, no small detail is lost, and no warmth either. The effect is not that of those furnished rooms from the old days such as one finds in museums, sometimes with wax figures standing about them. Everything moves at its normal pace; color and emotion run high as in life."

The Louisville Courier-Journal described it as "an outstanding historical novel and a vivid and imaginative job of story telling" that disproved common expectations that historical fiction descriptions of the American Revoliutin "can no longer be considered from a fresh, unhackneyed viewpoint." Some reviewers compared Raleigh's Eden to Gone with the Wind, describing Adam Rutledge as "an attractive version of the Scarlett O'Hara" of the earlier book. The Atlanta Journal's reviewer, William S. Thompson, called it "a first-rate piece of story-telling that deserves a large audience."

Revisiting the novel seven years after its publication, The Decatur Daily said that Fletcher wrote "with the skill of a fine artist," and called Raleigh's Eden "a novel of many brilliant facets," opining: "It will be read for pure pleasure, and it will be ready with pride in Americans who are ready to give all to resist European aggression and to establish the idea of native liberty."
