= Inglis Fletcher =

American dramatist

Noted author Inglis Fletcher dressed in costume

Inglis Fletcher (October 20, 1879 – May 30, 1969) was an American writer.

== Early life ==
Inglis Clark was born October 20, 1879, in Alton, Illinois, the daughter of Maurice W. Clark and Flora Chapman.

== Career ==
Inglis Fletcher is known for numerous novels and plays, especially her Carolina Series. She spent much of her life traveling and living around the country with her husband, John George Fletcher, a miner.

Research about her maternal ancestors in Tyrell County, North Carolina, sparked Fletcher's interest in eastern North Carolina, which led her to research and write the novels within her Carolina Series, including Lusty Wind for Carolina, Men of Albemarle, The Wind in the Forest, Raleigh's Eden, and Queen's Gift among others.

She published verse and publicity material and she was a book reviewer in S. P. Women's City Club magazine.

She was a manager of famous lecturers and co-manager with Alice Seckles in "Seckles–Fletcher Popular Lecture Series" in San Francisco and Oakland; she was also associated in management for the 1928–29 season in Los Angeles and Sacramento.

In 1928 she went on a six months' trek to the interior of the British East Africa, unaccompanied by any white person, to a region never before visited by a white woman — and by very few white men — for the study of native "Voodoo" and other pagan religious practices.

She was the originator of the Junior Red Cross Hospital program in Spokane Public Schools.

She was a member of American Pen Women and Daughters of the American Revolution.

== Personal life ==
Inglis Fletcher moved to San Francisco in 1925 and lived at 2442 Leavenworth Street, San Francisco, California.

Inglis Clark married John G. Fletcher. They had one son, Stuart.

She died on May 30, 1969, and is buried with her husband in the Wilmington National Cemetery in Wilmington, New Hanover County, North Carolina.

== Novels ==
=== Carolina Novels series ===
- Raleighʻs Eden (1940)
- Men of Albemarle (1942)
- Lusty Wind for Carolina (1944)
- Toil of the Brave (1946)
- Roanoke Hundred (1948)
- Bennett’s Welcome (1950)
- Queen's Gift (1952)
- The Scotswoman (1954)
- The Wind in the Forest (1957)
- Cormorant's Brood (1959)
- Wicked Lady (1962)
- Rogue's Harbor (1964)

=== Standalone novels ===
- The White Leopard (1931)
- Red Jasmine (1932)
- The Young Commissioner (1951)

== Legacy ==
Fletcher donated her oil portrait, painted by North Carolina artist, William C. Fields, to Fletcher Residence Hall and her papers to East Carolina University's Manuscript Collection at Joyner Library.

In 1996 she was inducted in the North Carolina Literary Hall of Fame.
