= Bobbs-Merrill Company =

American book publisher

- Parent company: SAMS Publishing (1959–1985)
- Status: Defunct
- Founded: 1850
- Founder: Samuel Merrill
- Defunct: 1985
- Successor: Macmillan
- Country of origin: United States
- Headquarters location: Indianapolis, Indiana

The Bobbs-Merrill Company was an American book publisher active from 1850 until 1985, and located in Indianapolis, Indiana.

== Company history ==
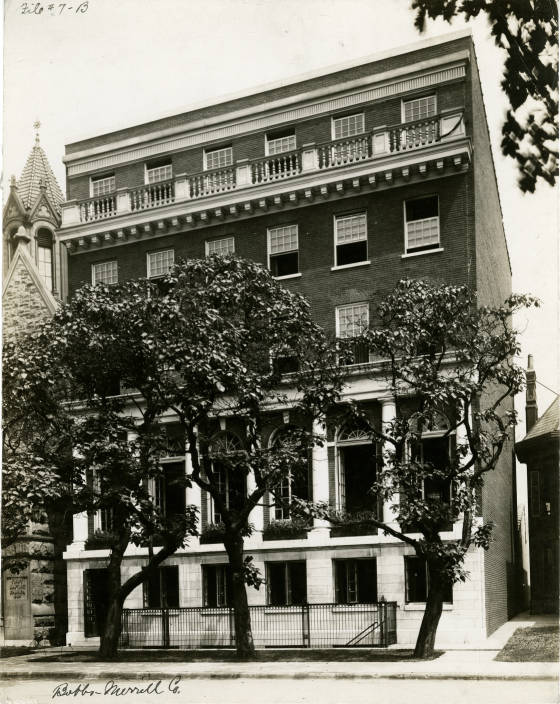
The office of the Bobbs-Merrill Company at 18 E. Vermont Street, Indianapolis, in 1911

The Bobbs-Merrill Company began 3 October 1850 when Samuel Merrill bought an Indianapolis bookstore and entered the publishing business. After his death in 1855, his son, Samuel Merrill Jr., continued the business. Soon after the American Civil War (1861–1865) the business became Merrill, Meigs, and Company, and in 1883 the name changed again to the Bowen-Merrill Company. In 1903 the name became the Bobbs-Merrill Company, after long-time director, William Conrad Bobbs. From 1899 through 1909, the company published 16 novels whose sales placed each of them among the nation's top ten best-selling books of the year for one or more years.

The company was the plaintiff in Bobbs-Merrill Co. v. Straus, 210 U.S. 339 (1908), a case regarded as the origin of copyright's first-sale doctrine.

Bobbs-Merrill was known for publishing such authors as Keith Ayling, Erving Goffman, Richard Halliburton, David Markson, Walter Dean Myers, Ayn Rand, James Whitcomb Riley, Mary Roberts Rinehart and Irma S. Rombauer. Of note, Irma S. Rombauer wrote The Joy of Cooking, Mary Roberts Rinehart wrote The Circular Staircase (1908) and Keith Ayling wrote The Story of Old Leatherneck of the Flying Tigers (1945). Bobbs-Merrill also published the early works of fantasy writer L. Frank Baum.

Bobbs-Merrill was responsible for a long period in its history for publishing the codified state laws of the State of Indiana and of other U.S. states. The firm also published legal and school textbooks, children's books (including The Wizard of Oz and "27 titles in the Raggedy Ann series"), and texts in the history of philosophy.

In 1944, Bobbs-Merrill commissioned artist Evelyn Copelman to illustrate a new edition of The Wonderful Wizard of Oz, reprinted as The Wizard of Oz and The New Wizard of Oz. Copelman's illustrations were more influenced by the 1939 Judy Garland MGM film version of the book than by W. W. Denslow's original 1900 illustrations, although the credits on the book stated otherwise. The year that Copelman's illustrations first appeared, 1949, was also the year of the film's first re-release.

In 1959, The Howard W. Sams Company purchased Bobbs-Merrill. When Sams was acquired by Macmillan in 1985, the Bobbs-Merrill name ceased being used, with the exception of continued sales of the Fifth Revision of The Joy of Cooking. This book continued to be a steady seller for Macmillan. There were also selected College Division titles, such as the Library of Liberal Arts.

== Book series ==
- The American Lake
- American Trails Series
- Bobbs-Merrill Reprint Series in the Social Sciences
- Childhood of Famous Americans Series
- Library of Liberal Arts
- Live Dolls (implied series)
- Makers of American Tradition
- Notable American Trials
- Raggedy Ann

== See also ==
- Angus Cameron (publisher)

== Archives ==
Bobbs-Merrill mss., 1885-1957. Lilly Library, Indiana University.
