= Awe (disambiguation) =

Awe is an emotion of respectful wonder.

AWE or awe may also refer to:

== Organizations ==
- AWE Nuclear Security Technologies, provider of the UK's nuclear deterrent system
- US Airways, by ICAO airline code
  - America West Airlines, an Airline that once used the ICAO code prior to the merger of US Airways.
- Australian Worldwide Exploration, a gas and oil company
- Automobilwerk Eisenach, a German automobile manufacturer
- AWE (TV network), an American cable network formerly known as Wealth TV

== Computing ==
- Address Windowing Extensions, a Microsoft Windows memory handling mode
- Sound Blaster AWE32 (Advanced Wave Effects), a sound card made by Creative Labs

== Places ==
- Awe, Kentucky, an unincorporated community in Lewis County
- Awe, Nigeria, a Local Government Area in Nasarawa State
- Loch Awe, a lake in Argyll and Bute, Scotland
- River Awe, the river from Loch Awe, Scotland
- Bridge of Awe, Argyll and Bute, a bridge over the River Awe and a settlement
- AsiaWorld-Expo, convention and exhibition facility in Hong Kong
- AWE, code for AsiaWorld–Expo station at the exhibition facility in Hong Kong

== Technology ==
- Atmospheric Waves Experiment, a NASA heliophysics experiment launched in 2023 to attach to the ISS for two years

== Other uses ==
- Francis Awe, Nigerian musician
- Australian White Ensign, the ensign flown by ships of the Royal Australian Navy
- Pirates of the Caribbean: At World's End, the third installment of the Pirates of the Caribbean film series
- An informal South African greeting, pronounced aah-weh, see list of South African slang words
- Average Weekly Earnings, the lead indicator of short-term changes in earnings
- Airborne wind energy, direct use or generation of wind energy by the use of aerodynamic or aerostatic lift devices
- Awe (film), a 2018 Telugu language film

== See also ==
- Sublime (philosophy)
- Shock and awe, a military doctrine also known as rapid dominance
