= Bridge of Awe =

Former bridge in Argyll and Bute, Scotland

- Coordinates: 56.41929°N 5.19448°W
- OS grid reference: NN 03062 29809
- Locale: Argyll and Bute

Characteristics
- Design: Arch
- Material: Stone
- No. of spans: 3

History
- Built: 1779

Listed Building – Category B
- Official name: Old Bridge of Awe River Awe
- Designated: 19 July 1971
- Reference no.: LB12178

Location
- Interactive map of Bridge of Awe

The Bridge of Awe (Scottish Gaelic: Drochaid Abha) was a triple-spanned arch bridge near Taynuilt in Argyll, Scotland.

== History ==
In 1753 the Bonawe Iron Furnace was constructed on the north side of Taynuilt. The furnace was of such strategic importance that in 1756 a military road was built to reach it, crossing the Pass of Brander and the Bridge of Awe. Despite flooding during construction, which swept away the partially built bridge, it was completed in 1779. It was twenty years before the road was extended westward to Connel, and later still to Oban.

The original bridge featured in the 1959 film 'The Bridal Path' starring George Cole and Gordon Jackson.

A reinforced concrete bridge was built in 1938 as a replacement for the old bridge. This is still in use today, carrying the A85 road from Oban to Dalmally over the River Awe.

The original bridge was destroyed in January 1992 following heavy floods. High winds had damaged the roof of the Inverawe Power Station, resulting in its temporary closure. Minimal water was drained from Loch Awe until the gates were opened to their maximum to relieve the level of Loch Awe and the Awe Barrage from overflowing. Two of the three arches of the old bridge were washed away, with one arch on the Taynuilt bank remaining, in part due to the deflection of the main flow by the small island upstream.

The course of the river has changed greatly since the 1992 floods. The island upstream now joins to the land on the Taynuilt bank in summer months when the river is low.

== See also ==
- List of bridges in Scotland
