= List of listed buildings in Ardchattan and Muckairn =

This is a list of listed buildings in the parish of Ardchattan and Muckairn in Argyll and Bute, Scotland.

== List ==
Name	Location	Date Listed	Grid Ref. (Note: Sometimes known as OSGB36, the grid reference (where provided) is based on the British national grid reference system used by the Ordnance Survey. • "Guide to National Grid". Ordnance Survey. • "Get-a-map". Ordnance Survey.)	Geo-coordinates	Notes	LB Number (Note: Historic Environment Scotland assign a unique alphanumeric identifier to each designated site in Scotland, for listed buildings this always begins with "LB", for example "LB12345".)	Image
Loch Creran, Mill Farm				56°30′47″N 5°21′28″W	Category B	6435	Upload Photo
Ichrachan Township Near Taynuilt, Cottage Near Roadside At West End Of Township				56°25′36″N 5°13′38″W	Category B	6368	Upload Photo
Ichrachan Township Near Taynuilt, Ichrachan Cottages				56°25′38″N 5°13′35″W	Category C(S)	6370	Upload Photo
Inverawe House				56°26′06″N 5°12′37″W	Category B	4699	Upload another image
St Conan's Kirk, Lochawe				56°23′43″N 5°03′15″W	Category A	4700	Upload another image See more images
Ardchattan Priory Church				56°27′45″N 5°17′42″W	Category B	4714	Upload another image See more images
Ben Cruachan Hydro Electric Scheme, Turbine Hall				56°23′37″N 5°06′45″W	Category A	51688	Upload Photo
Ardchattan Manse				56°27′40″N 5°17′14″W	Category C(S)	5116	Upload Photo
Barcaldine Bridge, Abhain Leithil				56°31′37″N 5°18′32″W	Category C(S)	4720	Upload Photo
Nelson Monument Taynuilt				56°25′47″N 5°14′12″W	Category B	4704	Upload another image
Taynuilt Inn Taynuilt				56°25′44″N 5°14′23″W	Category B	107	Upload another image
Druimavuic, Roadside Cairns Flanking A828				56°33′16″N 5°14′40″W	Category C(S)	48528	Upload Photo
Eriska House Isle Of Eriska				56°31′58″N 5°24′45″W	Category C(S)	4698	Upload another image
Achnacloich House (Stonefield)				56°27′14″N 5°19′10″W	Category B	4706	Upload Photo
Ardchattan House				56°27′45″N 5°17′42″W	Category B	4715	Upload Photo
Lochnell Castle Ardmucknish Bay				56°29′43″N 5°26′10″W	Category A	4716	Upload another image
Lonan Hotel (Barguilean House)				56°24′58″N 5°14′46″W	Category B	4705	Upload Photo
Shian House South Shian Loch Creran				56°31′30″N 5°24′06″W	Category C(S)	4718	Upload Photo
Lochnell House, Ardmucknish Bay, Barn (Bull House)				56°29′46″N 5°25′58″W	Category C(S)	44719	Upload Photo
Muckairn Manse Taynuilt				56°25′42″N 5°14′09″W	Category B	4703	Upload Photo
Lochnell House, Ardmucknish Bay, Steading				56°29′43″N 5°26′02″W	Category B	44720	Upload Photo
Ichrachan Township Near Taynuilt, Starling Cottage				56°25′38″N 5°13′35″W	Category C(S)	6369	Upload Photo
Glenure House				56°35′02″N 5°11′10″W	Category B	4697	Upload Photo
Ardchattan Kirk Achnaba				56°28′15″N 5°20′17″W	Category B	4712	Upload Photo
Falls Of Cruachan Railway Viaduct				56°23′40″N 5°06′51″W	Category A	50811	Upload another image
Ben Cruachan Hydro Electric Scheme, Cruachan Dam				56°24′23″N 5°06′47″W	Category B	51687	Upload Photo
Druimavuic Ballieveolon House				56°33′11″N 5°14′34″W	Category B	4721	Upload Photo
Loch Awe House				56°24′07″N 5°02′33″W	Category C(S)	4701	Upload another image
Muckairn Kirk Taynuilt				56°25′44″N 5°14′12″W	Category B	4702	Upload Photo
Old Ardchattan Kirk (Kilmodan) Baile Mhaodan				56°27′59″N 5°17′43″W	Category C(S)	4713	Upload Photo
Lochnell Observatory (St. Margaret's Tower) Lochnell Policies				56°29′22″N 5°26′29″W	Category A	4717	Upload another image
Barcaldine Castle				56°30′38″N 5°24′06″W	Category A	4719	Upload another image

== Key ==
The scheme for classifying buildings in Scotland is:

- Category A: "buildings of national or international importance, either architectural or historic; or fine, little-altered examples of some particular period, style or building type."
- Category B: "buildings of regional or more than local importance; or major examples of some particular period, style or building type, which may have been altered."
- Category C: "buildings of local importance; lesser examples of any period, style, or building type, as originally constructed or moderately altered; and simple traditional buildings which group well with other listed buildings."

In March 2016 there were 47,288 listed buildings in Scotland. Of these, 8% were Category A, and 50% were Category B, with the remaining 42% being Category C.

== See also ==
- List of listed buildings in Argyll and Bute
