= Ardchattan and Muckairn =

Scottish parish

Coordinates: 56°27′57″N 5°17′24″W

Ardchattan and Muckairn is a civil parish within Argyll and Bute in Scotland. It lies north of Oban, bordering Loch Etive and includes Glen Ure, Glen Creran, Barcaldine, Benderloch, Connel, Bonawe and Glen Etive. At the 2001 census, Ardchattan and Muckairn had a population of 2,443, between them. Its name derives from the 6th-century Irish monk Saint Cathan, combined with the Goidelic element ard-, or "heights".

In the past Ardchattan has been co-joined with its neighbouring parish of Muckairn, on the other side of Loch Etive. Its most famous landmark is Ardchattan Priory, founded as a Valliscaulian priory around 1230.

After the second world war the then owner Lieutenant-Colonel Robert (Bobby) Modan Thorne Campbell-Preston married the hospital administrator and widow Angela Murray in 1950. Their daughter, Sarah, was born in 1951.

The priory's ruins and surrounding gardens are now open to the public.

== See also ==
- Prior of Ardchattan
- Clan Chattan
