= Glenorchy =

Glenorchy may refer to:

- Glen Orchy, a glen in Scotland containing the River Orchy
- City of Glenorchy, a local government area of Tasmania, Australia
  - Glenorchy, Tasmania, the suburb contained within the local government area
- Glenorchy, Victoria, a town in Australia
- Glenorchy, New Zealand is a town bordering Lake Wakatipu in the South Island of New Zealand

== Sports teams ==
- Glenorchy Camanachd, a shinty club from Scotland
- Glenorchy Football Club, an Australian Rules Football Club
