= Tämnarån =

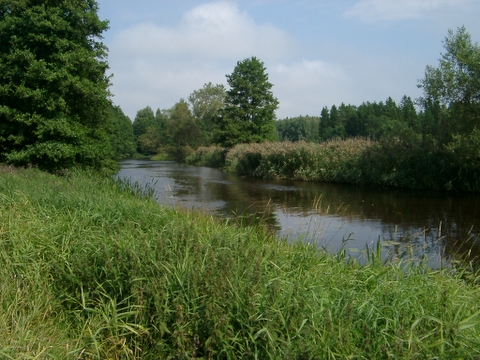

Location
- Country: Sweden

Physical characteristics
- Mouth: Bothnian Sea
  - location: Karlholmsbruk, Tierp Municipality
  - coordinates: 60°31′26″N 17°38′55″E
  - elevation: 0 m (0 ft)
- Length: 99 km (62 mi)
- Basin size: 1,258.1 km^{2} (485.8 sq mi)

The Tämnarån is an approximately 60 km long river in the northern parts of the Swedish historical province Uppland.
