= Cruachanside Camanachd Club =

Scottish shinty club

Cruachanside
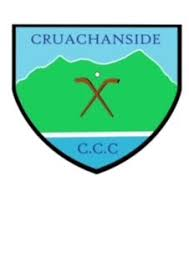
- Full name: Cruachanside Camanachd Club
- Gaelic name: Comann Camanachd Taobh Bheinn Chruachain
- Founded: 2022
- Ground: Taynuilt Playing Field
- League: South Division One
- 2022: 7th
Home

Cruachanside Camanachd Club is a shinty club which plays in Taynuilt, Argyll, Scotland. It plays in South Division One. It is a partnership between Taynuilt Shinty Club and Glenorchy Camanachd at senior level, allowing both clubs to have representation at adult level.

== History ==
The club was officially founded in 2022 as merger between the two clubs. They competed in the South Division One. They finished in the bottom half of the table. The club welcomed back Gary Innes to shinty, after the musician had retired for 8 years.

The Club's Black and Orange colours reflect the traditional black and white colours of Glenorchy and the orange of Taynuilt.
