= Tierp Church =

Coordinates: 60°17′56″N 17°28′11″E

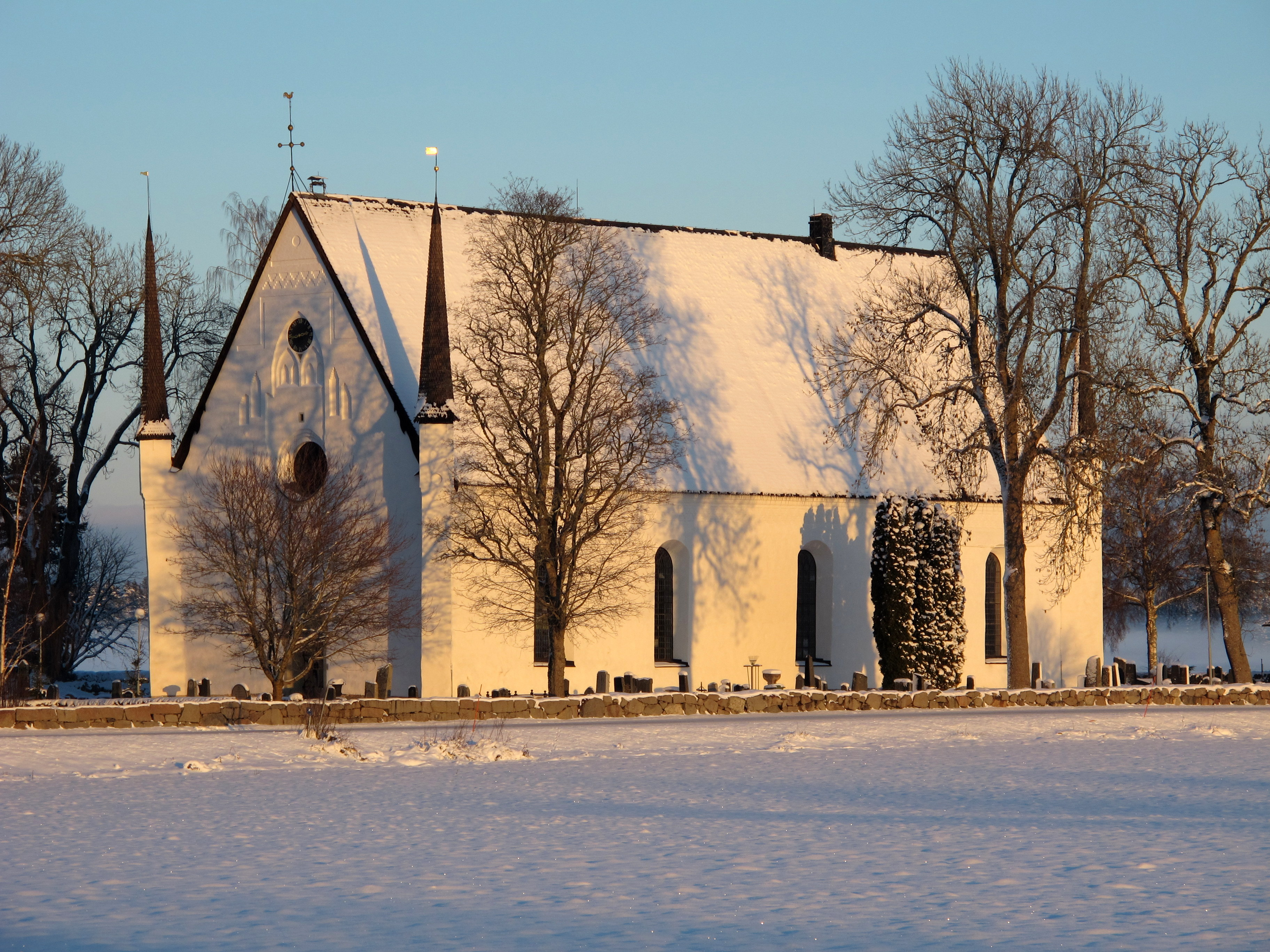
Tierp Church, external view

Tierp Church (Swedish: Tierps kyrka) is a Lutheran church in Tierp, Uppsala County, Sweden. It belongs to the Archdiocese of Uppsala. The church is one of the largest countryside churches in Uppland and contains well-preserved medieval frescos.

== History and architecture ==
The church was built at the end of the 13th century or around the year 1300. The building material is fieldstone and brick. The internal vaults were constructed sometime between 1430 and 1460, replacing an earlier ceiling made of wood. During the same period the gables of the church were remade. The vaults were subsequently decorated by artists of the Tierp school. The church paintings were covered with whitewash during the 18th century but restored during a renovation in 1915.

The church is a hall church with external buttresses crowned with spires. The façade is today whitewashed.

It contains a triumphal cross from the second half of the 13th century and a baptismal font from the 15th century. The pulpit was made in 1781.

The church has an external wooden bell tower, one of the largest in Uppsala county.

A renovation of the interior was carried out in 2009-2010.
