= Karlholmsbruk =

- Location within Uppsala Location within Sweden
- Coordinates: 60°31′N 17°37′E
- Country: Sweden
- Province: Uppland
- County: Uppsala County
- Municipality: Tierp Municipality

Area
  - Total: 2.37 km^{2} (0.92 sq mi)

Population (31 December 2010)
  - Total: 1,150
  - Density: 485/km^{2} (1,260/sq mi)
- Time zone: UTC+1 (CET)
  - Summer (DST): UTC+2 (CEST)

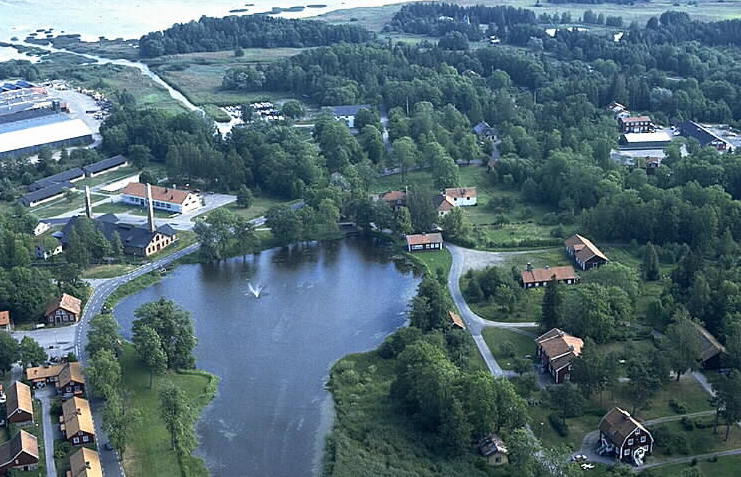

Karlholmsbruk is a locality situated in Tierp Municipality, Uppsala County, Sweden with 1,150 inhabitants in 2010.

In 1725 Charles de Geer of Lövstabruk purchased the mansions of Finnerånger, from Johan Dahl Finnerånger, and Holmsånger, from Hugo Johan Hamilton Holmsånger, in order to start an ironworks, Karlholmsbruk, at the mouth of Tämnarån, which he successfully did after a lengthy legal process. Originally a Wallonic hearth was erected. In 1880 it was replaced by a Lancashire hearth. Iron production was discontinued in September 1932.
