= Lancashire hearth =

Wrought iron production method

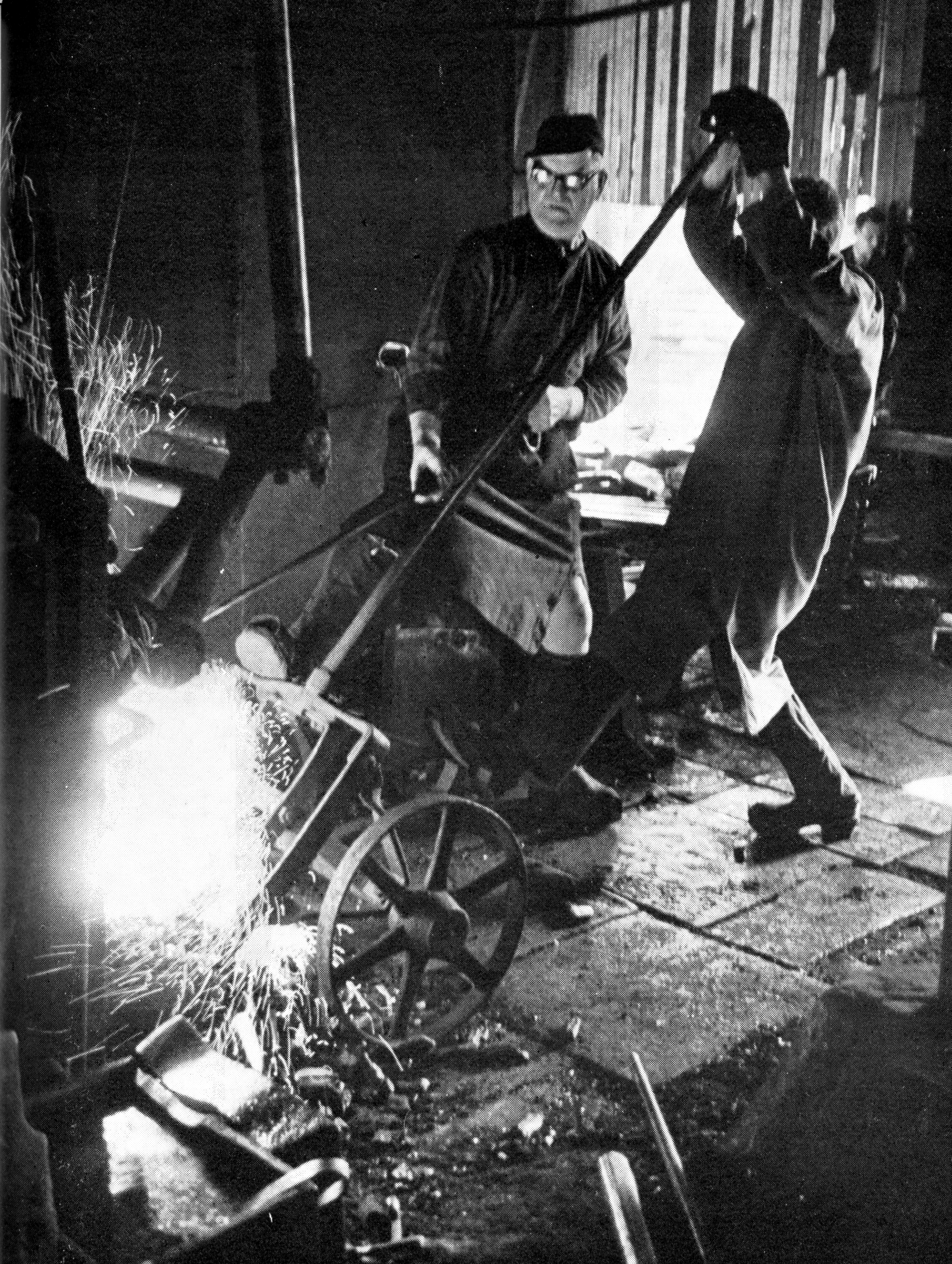
Men working a Lancashire hearth in Sweden

The Lancashire hearth was used to fine pig iron, removing carbon to produce wrought iron.

== Origins ==
Until the early 19th century, the usual method of producing wrought iron involved a charcoal-fired finery in a finery forge. In the beginning of the 19th century this became an obsolete process and was slowly replaced by the coal-fueled puddling process. However, charcoal continued to be used in some forges after most of the iron industry had abandoned it for coke.

When John Bradley & Co. (whose leading partner was James Foster) took over forges at Eardington in Shropshire, in 1813, a potting and stamping forge, they reverted to using charcoal. In 1820, he bought Hampton Loade Forge, which then became a tinplate works and in 1826 another charcoal forge. This was followed by other charcoal forges at Horsehay in 1832 and at the Old Park ironworks of the Botfield family about 1826. Cookley Forge in the Stour valley also reverted to charcoal working in 1814, supplying wire and tinplate mills.

By the 1830s, these forges were sometimes producing over 2,000 tons of iron per year, compared with a few hundred from earlier finery forges. It is likely that these forges were using a more efficient variety of hearth, which from Swedish usage has come to be known as a Lancashire hearth.

== Spread ==
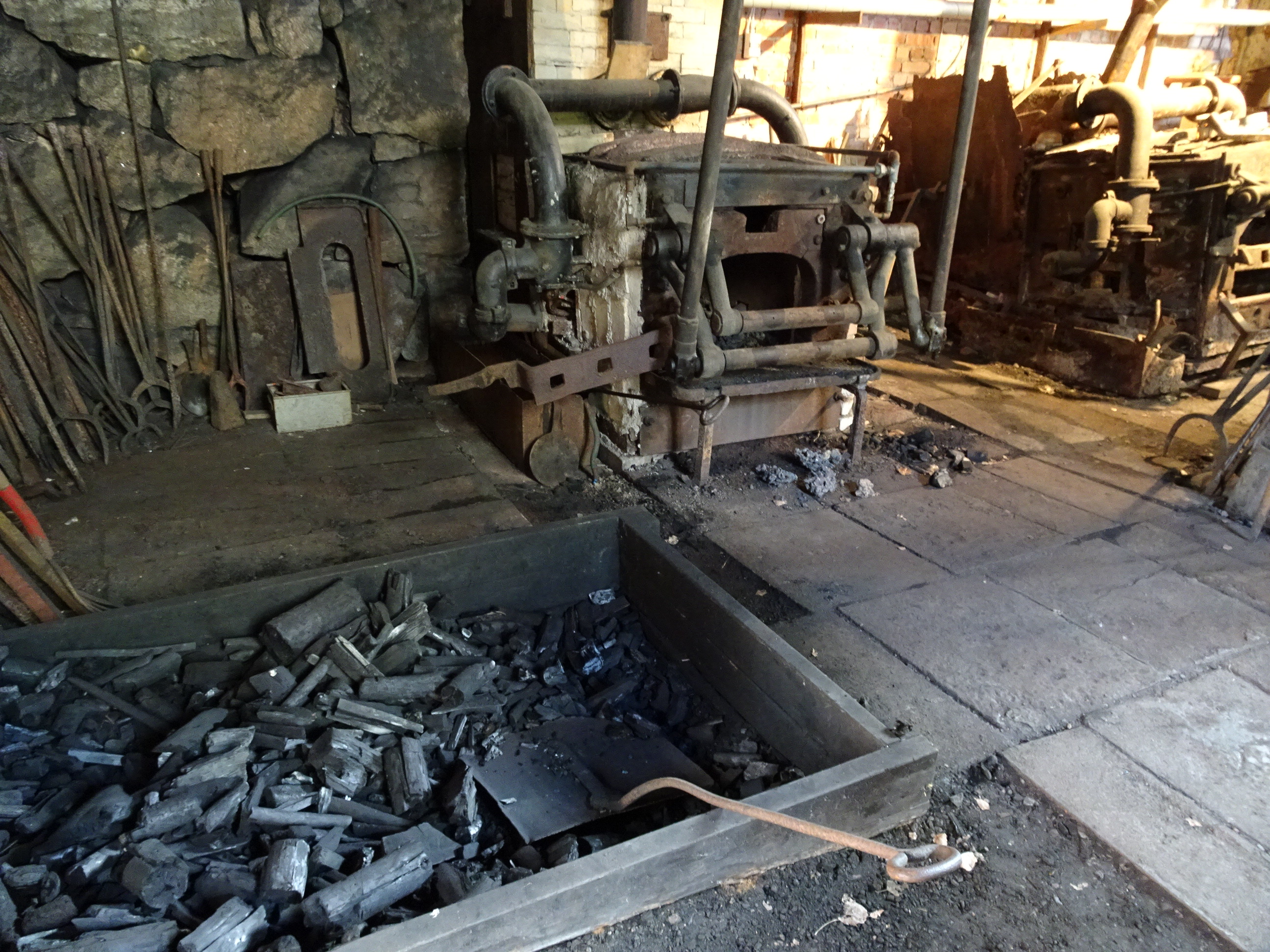
A Lancashire hearth in Sweden

Faced with competition from cheaper British iron production, the Swedish iron industry needed to find a new cheaper method of making iron. In the 1810s, experiments were made with puddling, but this proved unsatisfactory, as it needed coal of which Sweden had none. After Gustav Ekman visited Britain, he published a report of his observations. He had seen closed finery hearths in south Wales and near Ulverston, then in Lancashire (now Cumbria). Those in south Wales were similar to puddling furnaces, but in Lancashire, he saw closed furnaces, where the metal was in contact with the fuel. On his return to Sweden, Ekman experimented and built furnaces similar to what he had seen near Ulverston, most probably at Newland ironworks.

In 1829-30, Waern installed a furnace of the south Wales type at Backefors ironworks, while independently Ekman built Lancashire hearths at Dormsjö and Söderfors. From there the process spread to other forges. Charcoal consumption by the metallurgical industry in Sweden peaked about 1885. In 1887, 406 hearths made 210,500 tons of iron. The last Lancashire forge in Sweden was at Ramnäs, closed in 1964.

In Shropshire, charcoal iron production continued on a significant scale, but declined after 1870, rods for wire-drawing being a significant product. However most charcoal forges were probably closed by 1890.

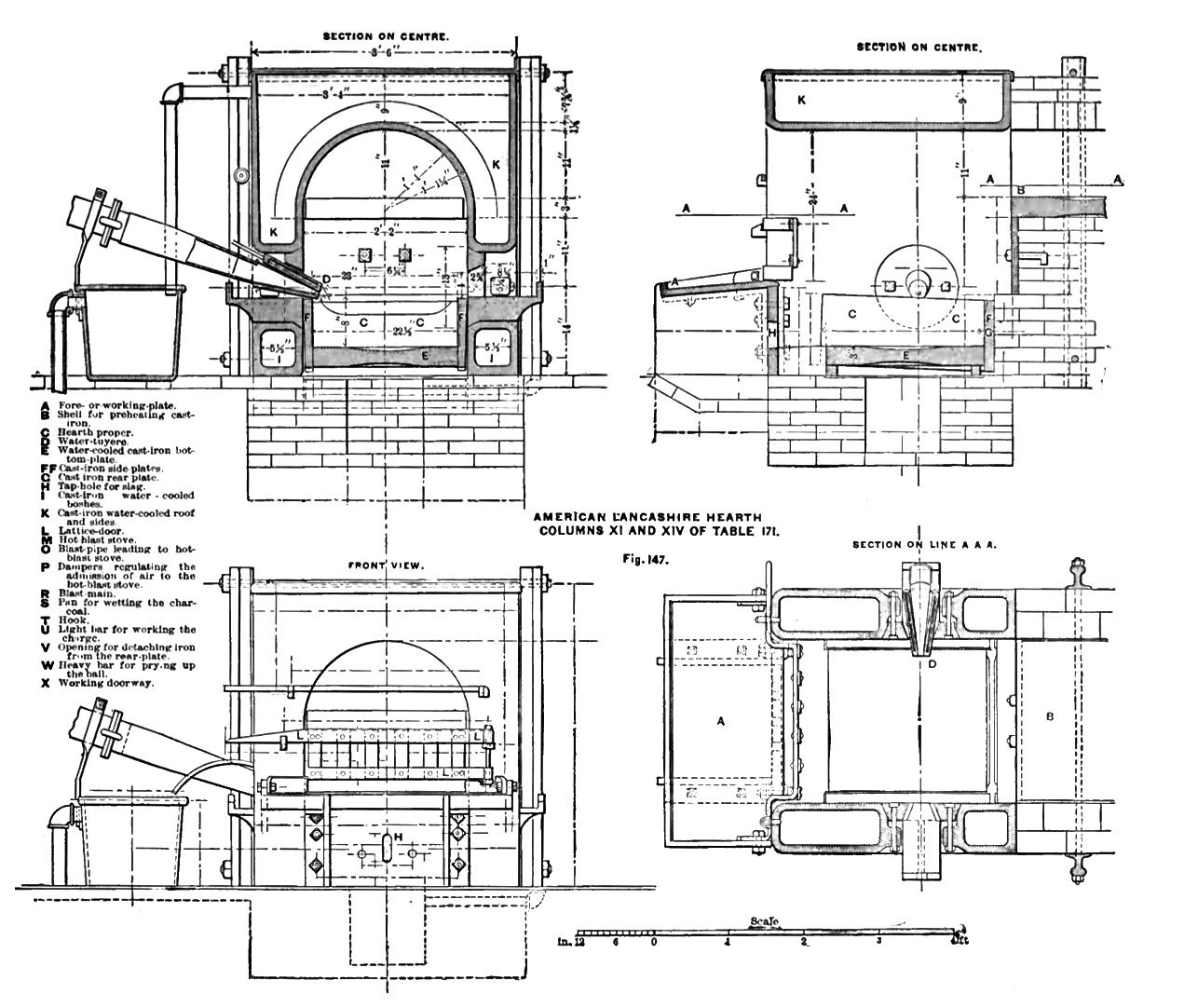
A diagram of a Lancashire hearth, 1890

== Process ==
The Swedish Lancashire hearth consisted of a rectangular closed furnace with a chimney (8 metres high) at one end and a working arch in front of the hearth proper at the other. Pig iron was charged through a door at the foot of the chimney and stacked on an iron-clad bridge so that it could be heated by the waste gases from the hearth. The hearth was blown through a single water-cooled tuyere with pre-heated air. The hearth consisted of a rectangular box of iron plates, the bottom plate being water-cooled. Surplus slag was removed with a shovel between firings, but some was left to help the process. Pig stacked on the bridge at the back of the hearth was then pulled forward with a hook and charcoal added. The blast was then turned on and fining began.

When the pigs began to melt, rabelling began (as in the Walloon process) using two bars of iron one to stir the iron and the other to lift it back into the blast. Periodically the tuyere had to be cleaned of matter adhering to it with a third bar. Finally, the iron was gathered into a 'loop' which was lifted out of the hearth with a heavier bar and tongs, and taken to the shingling hammer.

The process was more fuel-efficient and more productive than its predecessors.
