= Dyfi Furnace =

Blast furnace in Ceredigion, Wales

Coordinates: 52.5382°N 3.9403°W

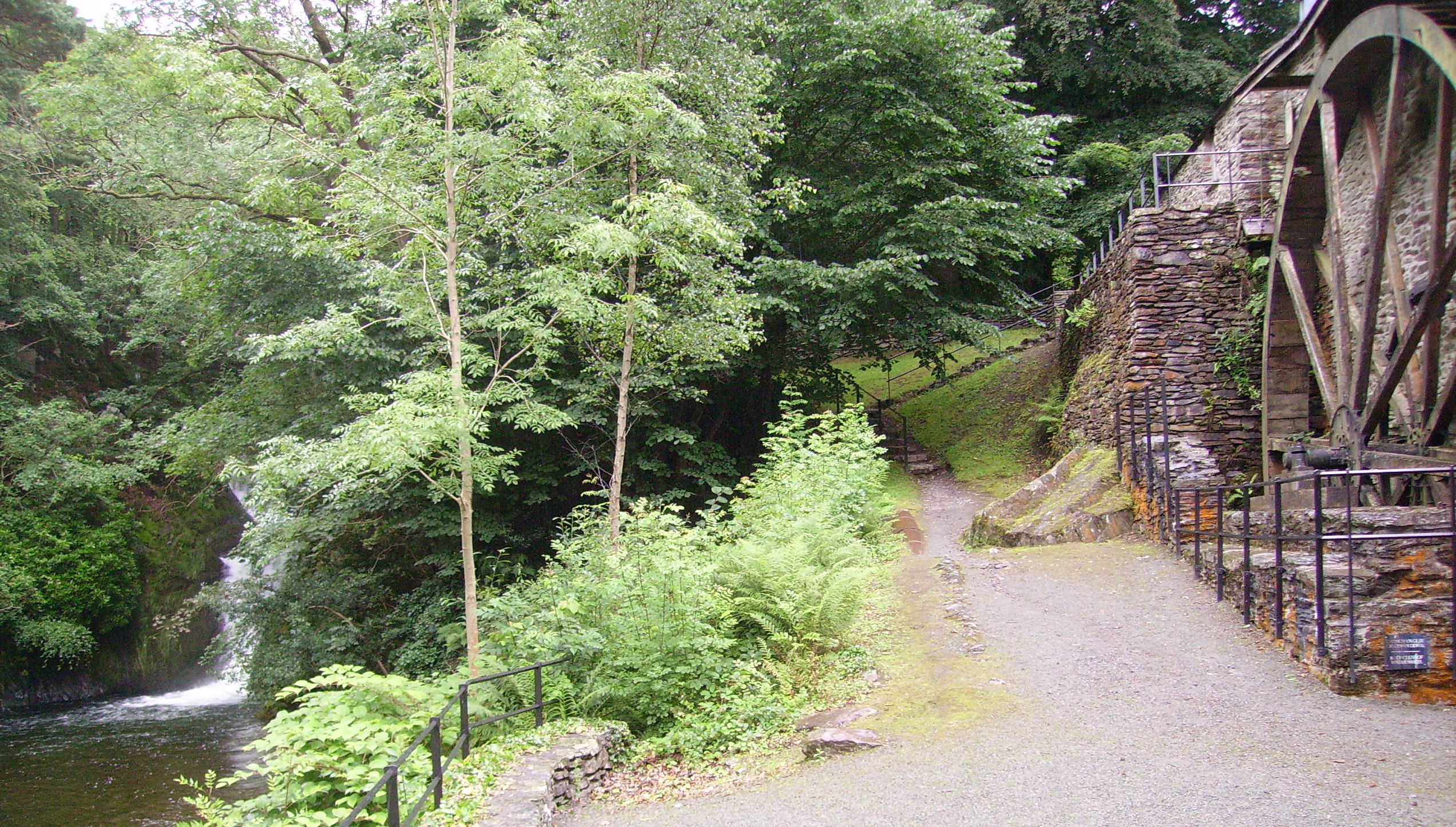
Dyfi Furnace

Dyfi Furnace is a restored mid 18th century charcoal fired blast furnace used for smelting iron ore. It has given its name to the adjoining hamlet of Furnace (Welsh: Ffwrnais).

== Location ==
The Dyfi Furnace is in the village of Furnace, Ceredigion, Wales, adjoining the A487 trunk road from Machynlleth to Aberystwyth, near Eglwysfach.

== History ==
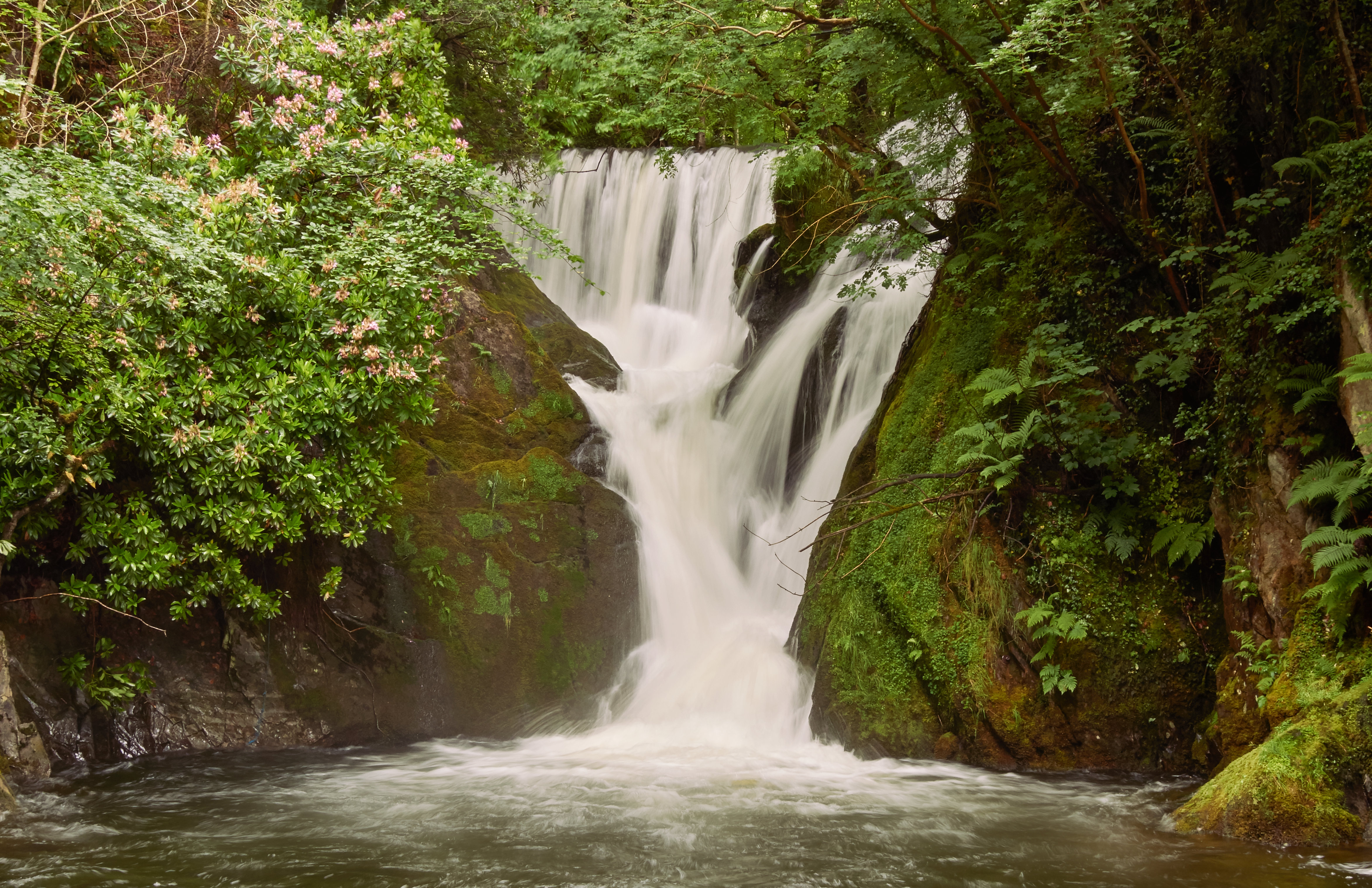
Waterfall on the River Einion at Dyfi Furnace. A mill race leads from the top of the waterfall to power the breastshot waterwheel

The site for Dyfi Furnace was chosen downstream of the waterfall on the River Einion to take advantage of the water power from the river and charcoal produced from the local woodlands, with the iron ore being shipped in from Cumbria via the Afon Dyfi.

The furnace built around 1755 was only used for about fifty years to smelt iron ore. By 1810 it had been abandoned and the waterwheel removed. The etching by John George Wood to accompany his "The Principal Rivers of Wales", published 1813, shows the furnace in its transitional form with no waterwheel attached. Some time later a new waterwheel was installed – the one that has been renovated and is visible today – and the furnace became a sawmill. The furnace site was renovated around 1988.

The furnace was built by Ralph Vernon and the brothers Edward Bridge and William Bridge. Vernon retired between 1765 and 1770, and the Bridges (who also owned Conwy Furnace) became bankrupt in 1773. It is likely that the furnace was then transferred to Kendall & Co. (Jonathan Kendall and his brother Henry), ironmasters from the West Midlands with extensive interests scattered across Staffordshire, Cheshire, The Lake District and Scotland. After the original lease expired in 1796, it appears the furnace was then owned by Bell and Gaskell, including Thomas Bell, who had managed it for the Kendalls, whose main activity by then was running the Beaufort Ironworks in Beaufort, Ebbw Vale, in the South Wales Valleys.

The water wheel, shown in the photographs, provided power for a sawmill.

The site was previously a Silver Mill of the Society of Mines Royal.

Water wheel	Dyfi Furnace	Dyfi Furnace

== See also ==
- Harrison Ainslie
