= Örbyhus =

- Location within Uppsala Location within Sweden Location within European Union
- Coordinates: 60°13′36″N 17°42′17″E
- Country: Sweden
- Province: Uppland
- County: Uppsala County
- Municipality: Tierp Municipality

Area
  - Total: 1.58 km^{2} (0.61 sq mi)

Population (31 December 2020)
  - Total: 2,247
  - Density: 1,420/km^{2} (3,680/sq mi)
- Time zone: UTC+1 (CET)
  - Summer (DST): UTC+2 (CEST)

Örbyhus is a locality situated in Tierp Municipality, Uppsala County, Sweden with 2,153 inhabitants in 2018.

Örbyhus Castle, located a few kilometers from the village, is where king Eric XIV of Sweden was imprisoned until his death from arsenic poisoning on 26 February 1577.

== History ==
Libbarbo was a farm property located south of what is now Örbyhus, dating back to the 13th century. In the 1820s Libbarbo was a large farm with a number of buildings as well as a croft for a croft soldier.

In 1874, a railway station on the new railroad which connected Stockholm with Gävle was built, and formed the nucleus of the new village Örbyhus. The politician Balzar von Platen (son of the naval officer Balzar von Platen, who constructed Göta Canal) was Count of Örbyhus Castle at the time, and he may have influenced the placement of the station.

Several factories and other industries were built in Örbyhus in the early 20th century: a steam sawmill, two bed factories, and a manufacturer of harrows and other farm equipment. Bröderna Larssons Snickeri- & Skidfabrik, a ski manufacturer which also made garden furniture, kick sleds and toboggans, was built in 1905, and Örbyhus also had two textile factories in the first half of the 20th century.
