= Tierp =

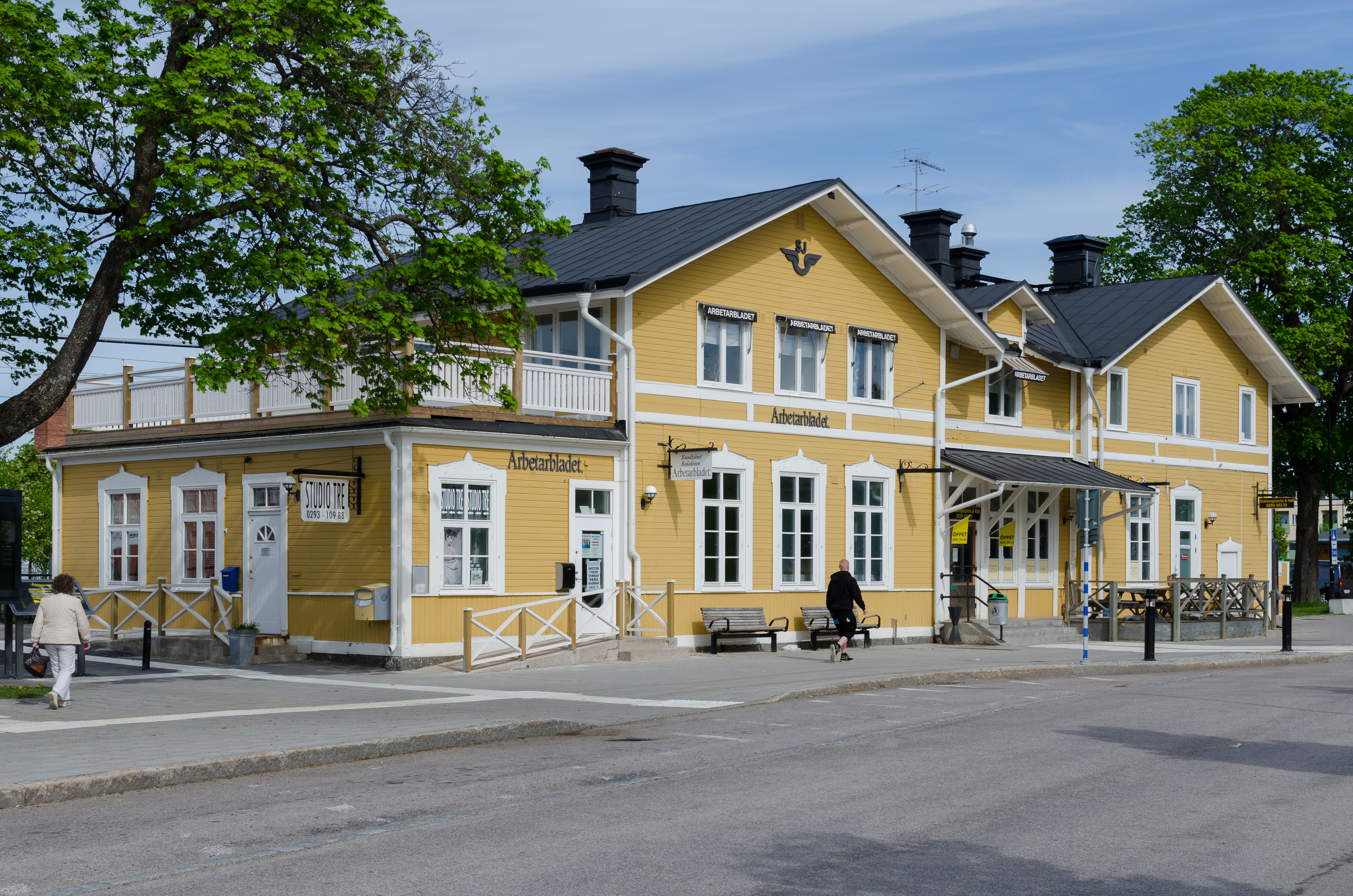
- Tierp Train Station

- Location within Uppsala Location within Sweden
- Coordinates: 60°20′N 17°30′E
- Country: Sweden
- Province: Uppland
- County: Uppsala County
- Municipality: Tierp Municipality

Area
  - Total: 4.11 km^{2} (1.59 sq mi)

Population (31 December 2020)
  - Total: 6,260
  - Density: 1,520/km^{2} (3,940/sq mi)
- Time zone: UTC+1 (CET)
  - Summer (DST): UTC+2 (CEST)

Tierp (Swedish pronunciation: [ˈtǐːɛrp]) is a locality and the seat of Tierp Municipality, Uppsala County, Sweden with 6,143 inhabitants in 2018.

== Communications ==
Tierp is connected to Uppsala and Gävle by commuter train Mälartåget and the new (2007) section of highway E4 passes just west of Tierp.

== Sports ==
The following sports clubs are located in Tierp:

- Strömsbergs IF
- Tierp City FC
- Tierps IF

Tierp Arena is located here. It is a world class auto racing facility. The main sport at this facility is Drag Racing. It hosts two FIA European Drag Races per year. One in June and the other in August.

== Main sights ==
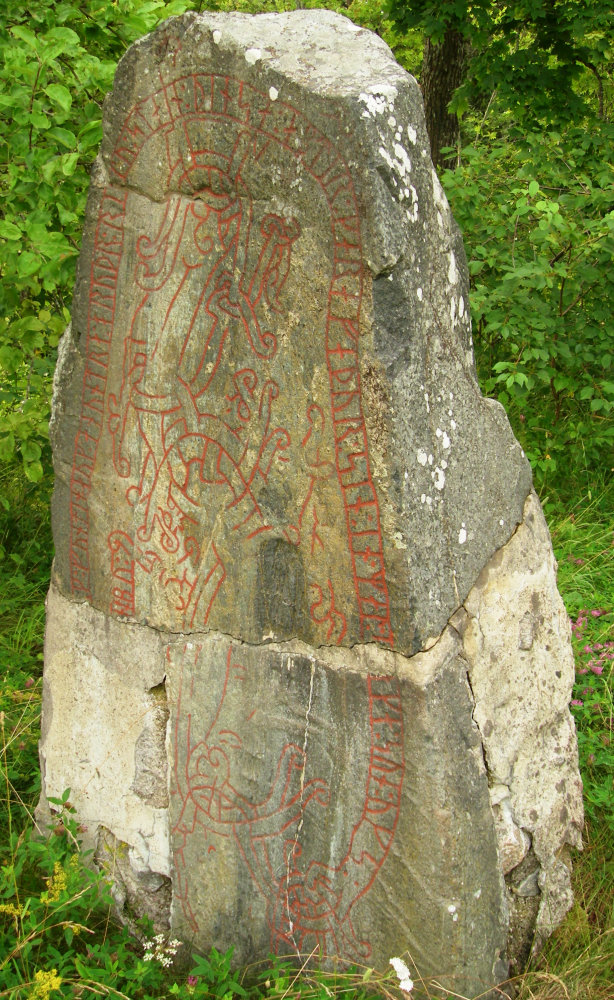
Gillberga runestone.

Tämnarån is a river passing just west of the locality. The Gillberga runestone is located across the river, close to where it is crossed by a wooden pedestrian bridge. Two other runestones, nr 1144 and 1145, are located a couple of miles south of Tierp.
