= Bonawe =

Bonawe: Scottish Gaelic: Bun Abha
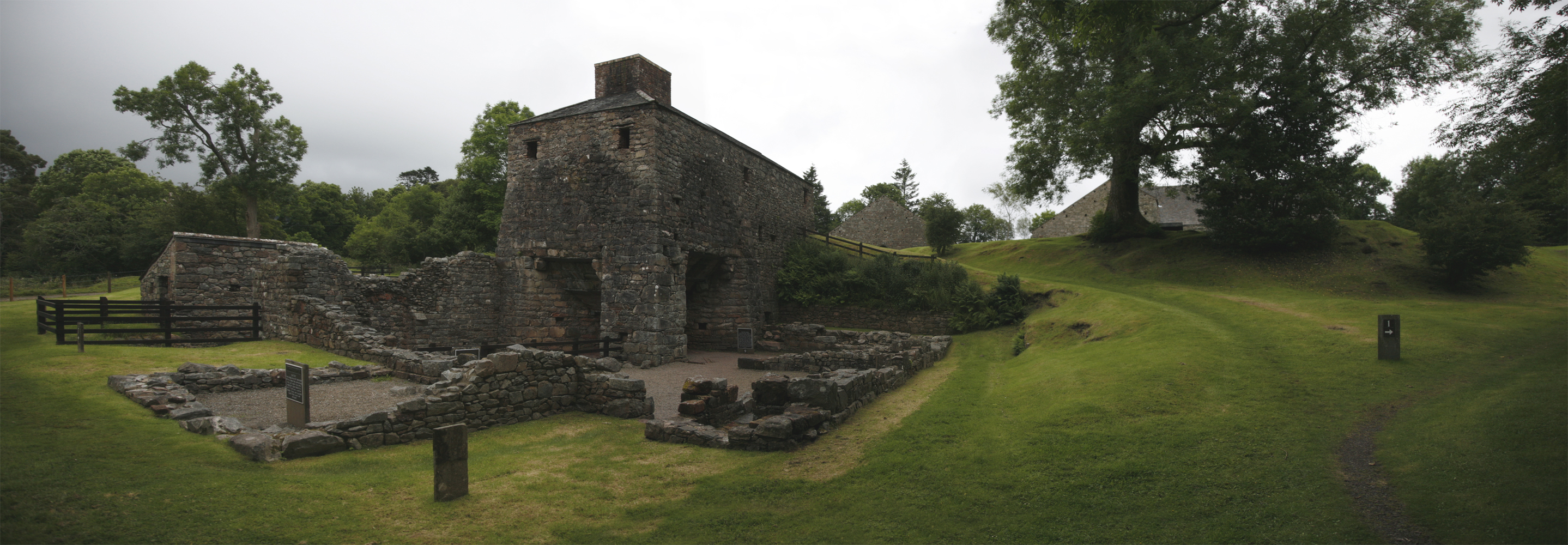
- Ancient Iron Furnace

- Location within Argyll and Bute
- OS grid reference: NN002340
- Council area: Argyll and Bute
- Lieutenancy area: Argyll and Bute
- Country: Scotland
- Sovereign state: United Kingdom
- Post town: OBAN
- Postcode district: PA37
- Police: Scotland
- Fire: Scottish
- Ambulance: Scottish
- UK Parliament: Argyll, Bute and South Lochaber
- Scottish Parliament: Argyll and Bute

Bonawe (Scots pronunciation: [boˈnɔː]; Scottish Gaelic: Bun Abha [puˈna.ə]) is a village in Ardchattan Parish Argyll and Bute, Scotland opposite Taynuilt on the north shore of Loch Etive, most famous for the shipping firm J & A Gardener's Bonawe Quarry - now owned by Breedon Aggregates Scotland Ltd (56°27′05″N 05°13′25″W). Bonawe is primarily a linear settlement along on the B845 road and the coast. The iron furnace is at Bonawe in Glenorchy & Inishail Parish across Loch Etive nr Taynuilt in Muckairn Parish.

== Bonawe Quarry ==
In the early 1900s there were 1,000 people living in Bonawe. The hub of this community was the Bonawe Quarry which still operates to this day. In those days there were stonemasons, drillers and miners extracting the stone and of course their families and support industries such as local shops, butchers, bowling greens, a cinema, bakeries and laundry. But now technology has advanced which means very few people are needed from the quarry and people can come from far to work, and as a result there are no shops left in Bonawe.

== Ardchattan Primary School ==
When the school opened in 1886, on the shores of Loch Etive, it had a roll of 14. The number rose to 50 within five years and in 1940 it hit 100 - including 40 Second World War evacuees. It is now mothballed due to no children. It ran for 128 years until 2014.

== Kenmore Cottages ==
Kenmore Cottages is a small village just 2 minutes away from the school and a 20-minute walk from the quarry. There is 27 houses in the horseshoe-shaped village. Other than that, there are some houses near the quarry and on the road to Oban, but many are ruins.

== Bonawe Ferry ==
There was a ferry crossing at Bonawe, from Eilean Duirinnis known as the "Penny Ferry".

== Etymology ==
The name is derived from Scottish Gaelic Bun Abha, meaning "the mouth of the River Awe".

== Lorn Furnace ==
Lorn Furnace or Bonawe Furnace is located across the loch, in Glenorchy and Innishail Parish, between the rivers Awe and Nant, close to Taynuilt Village in Muckairn Parish from which the Nant separates it. It was built in 1753 by Richard Ford & Co. (the Newland Company) from Furness (now in Cumbria) to use Furness haematite ore with local charcoal. The same company operated the furnace until 1876. The site is in the guardianship of Historic Scotland.
