= Bonawe Iron Furnace =

Industrial complex located in Bonawe, Lorn District, Scotland

Coordinates: 56.4370°N 5.2299°W

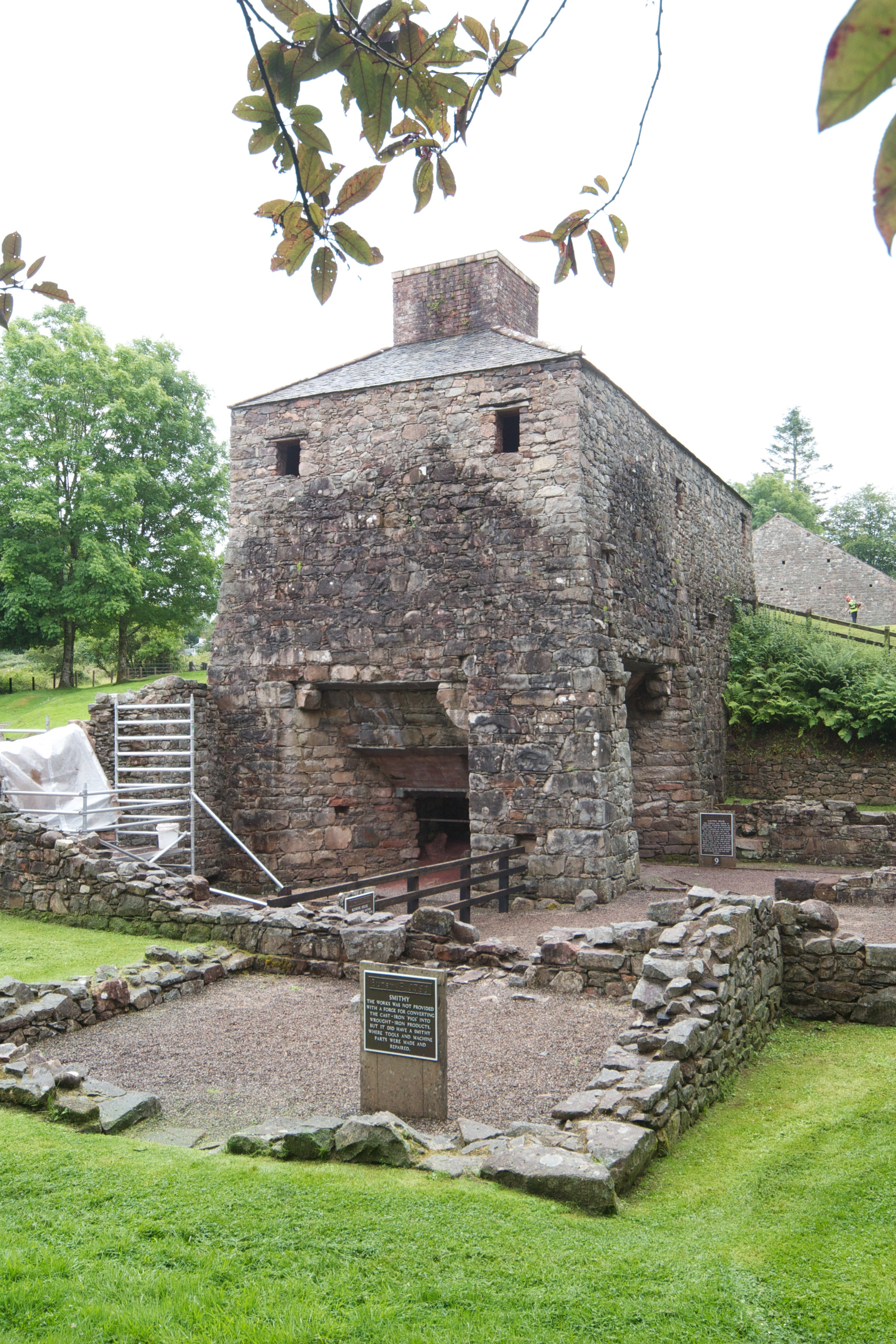

- Location within Argyll and Bute
- Established: 1753
- Location: Taynuilt, Argyll

The Bonawe Iron Furnace (also called the Lorn Furnace) was an industrial complex located in Bonawe, Lorn District, Scotland. It operated in the middle of the eighteenth century, with the aim of producing pig iron. Central to this complex was a charcoal fired blast furnace. The site is designated as a scheduled monument.

== History ==
The industrial complex was built in 1753 by Richard Ford's small business, the Newland Company. The site was chosen because there was enough wood in the area for the production of charcoal, as well as the fact that there was enough water pressure in the river to drive a water wheel. As the company itself was established in Cumbria, the blast furnace was managed by a local representative of the firm. During construction, most of the building materials were brought in from Cumbria. For the furnace to produce pig iron, it first had to be brought up to temperature, which took about one week. The furnace was used almost continuously for nine months at a time.

The complex employed as many as 600 people at the height of its operation. The majority of the staff were needed for the collection of timber and the manufacture of charcoal. The daily output could reach up to 2500 kilograms of pig iron and the annual production was about 700,000 kilograms. As the complex did not include a forge, finished iron products could not be manufactured, with the exception of simple objects such as cannonballs. The majority of pig iron was taken to offices of the Newland Company in Cumbria to be shipped for further processing.

As of 1750, the use of coke as fuel was becoming common. The first blast furnace in Scotland which made use of coke was built in 1759 near Falkirk. This new development in the production of iron in the complex made Bonawe less profitable. In the nineteenth century, production fell sharply and the complex was closed in 1876.

The remains of Bonawe Iron Furnace are currently managed by Historic Environment Scotland.

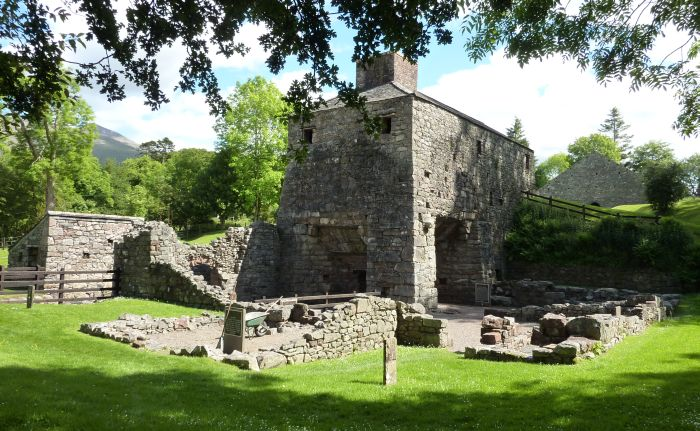
The building with the blast furnace.

== Construction ==
The part of the complex that was needed for the production of the pig iron consisted of four separate buildings. Two of these buildings were used for the storage of charcoal, one for the storage of iron ore, and one for the housing of the actual smelting furnace. In addition to these four buildings that had a central role, there were other buildings that were associated with the complex, such as buildings for the accommodation of workers, a home for the local representative of the Newland Company, and an aqueduct. There was also a pier for the supply of raw materials and shipping of finished product.

=== Storage of charcoal ===
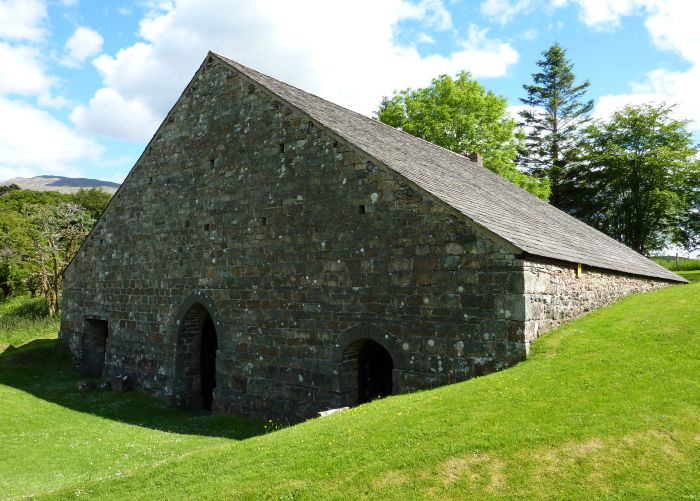
Building for storing charcoal, built on a slope.

There were two buildings for the storage of charcoal, but they also contained room for the storage of other products. The bark of felled trees was sold in turn to tanneries. The storehouses were dug into a bank, so that material could be brought in at the back of the building, at the top of the slope, and removed at a lower level at the front. The total storage capacity of these two buildings together was more than 2500 cubic meters.

=== Storage of iron ore ===
This building was built on a slope to facilitate loading and unloading of materials. In the building were hematite and other minerals, including limestone. All of these minerals were needed in the preparation of pig iron.

=== Blast furnace ===
The blast furnace was central to the function of the entire complex. The raw materials were placed in the furnace stack from the southern wing of the building, known as the charging house. North of the smelter was the blowing house which, equipped with bellows, continuously supplied air to the furnace. On the eastern exterior wall of the house was a water wheel which kept the bellows in constant motion. The water for the wheel was brought from the river Awe via an aqueduct. On the west side of the furnace was the casting house where the molten iron was poured into moulds to form pig iron bars. The slag, a by-product, was taken outside.

== Gallery ==
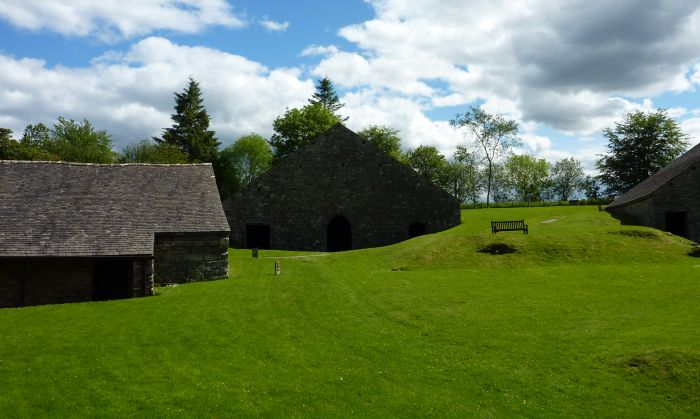
On the left the building for the storage of iron ore, in the middle and on the right buildings for the storage of charcoal

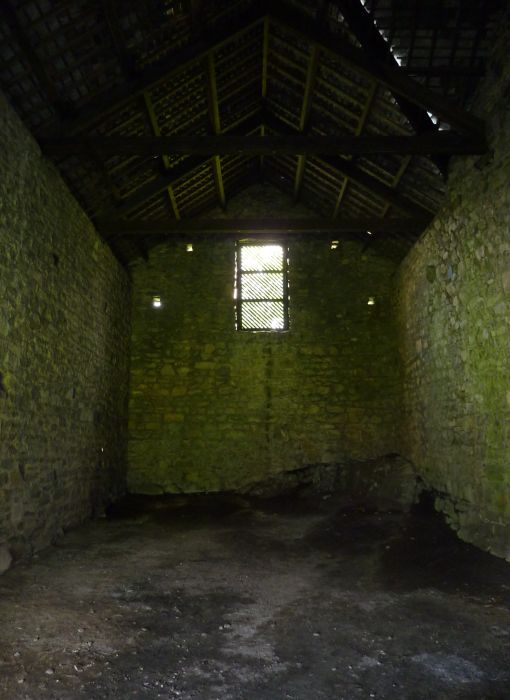
Storage for charcoal

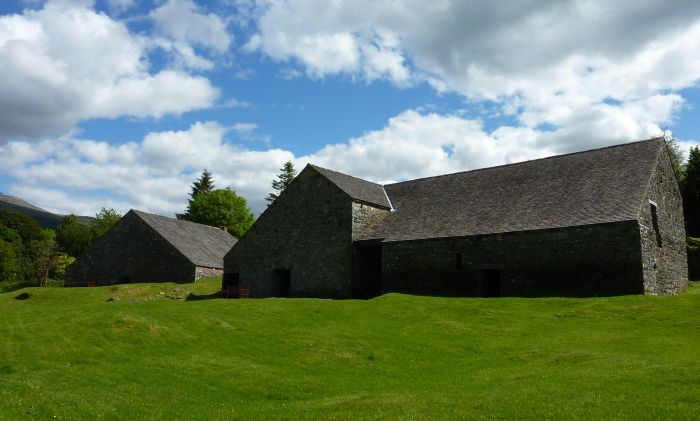
The two storage areas for charcoal
