= Uppland Runic Inscription 1146 =

Viking Age memorial runestone in Gillberga, which, Uppsala County, Sweden

Coordinates: 60°21′02″N 17°32′41″E

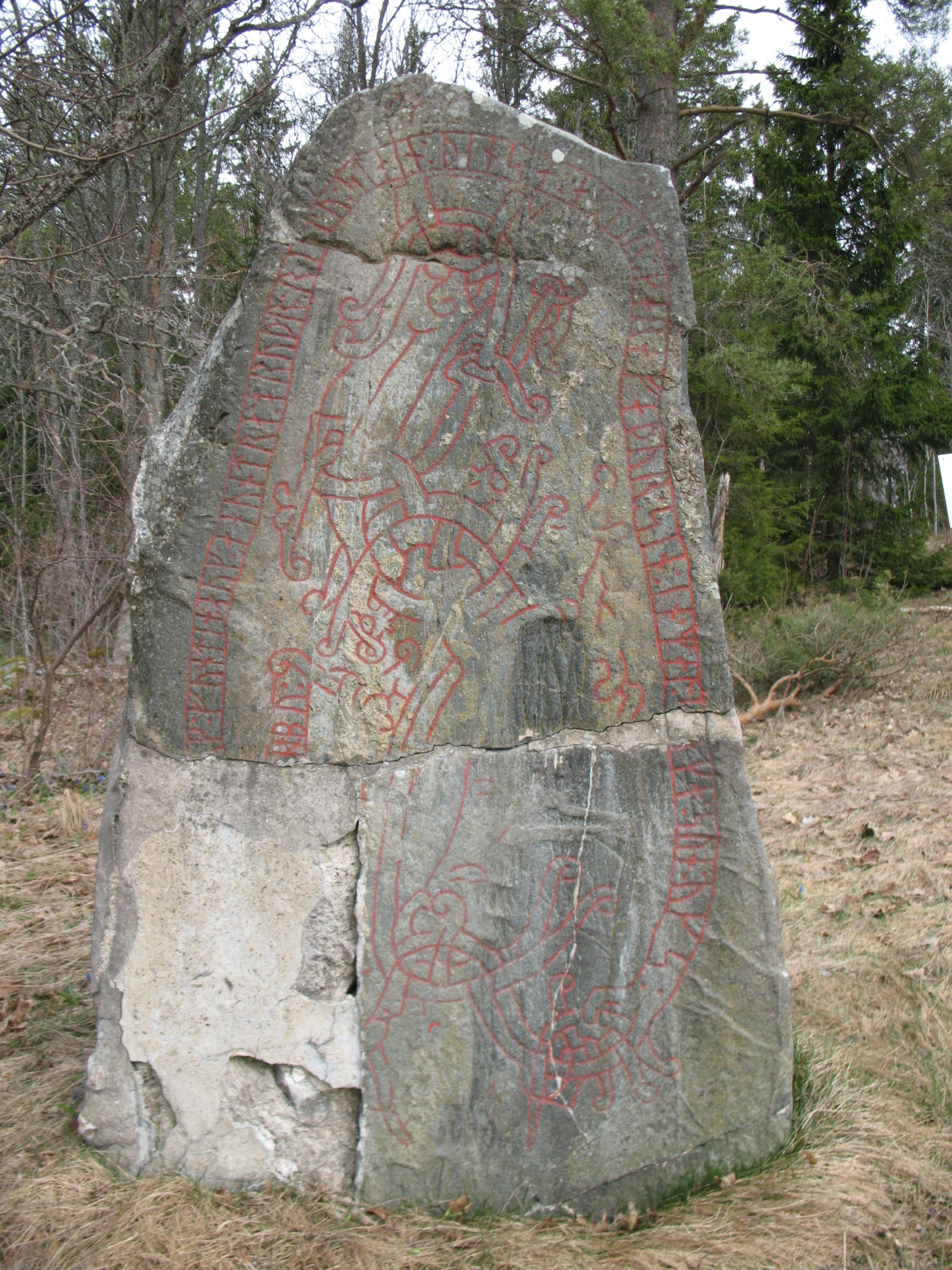
Runic inscription U 1146 is located in Gillberga, Uppland, Sweden.

Uppland Runic Inscription 1146, also known as U 1146, is the Rundata catalog designation for a Viking Age memorial runestone that is located in Gillberga, which is about 1 kilometer east of Tierp, Uppsala County, Sweden, which is in the historic province of Uppland.

== Description ==
This inscription consists of runic text on a serpent that is intertwined in the center with other stylized beasts. The granite stone, which is 1.85 meters in height, is classified as being carved in runestone style Pr1, which is also known as Ringerike style. This is the classification for inscriptions where the runic bands end in serpent or beasts heads. The inscription is unsigned, but through stylistic analysis it is considered to have been carved by the same runemaster as inscription U 1016 in Fjuckby, which is one of the Greece runestones. One runologist suggested that the style of this inscription with its curved lines is considered unusual and different from that on most other runestones in the district and better suited for wood and metal, making it likely that only few runemasters ever tried to apply it on stone. Besides U 1016, the other inscriptions with this unusual style are N 84 in Vang, N 62 in Alstad, and Sö 280 in Strängnäs. The runestone has been damaged over time, and a break in the middle of the stone was repaired in 1933.

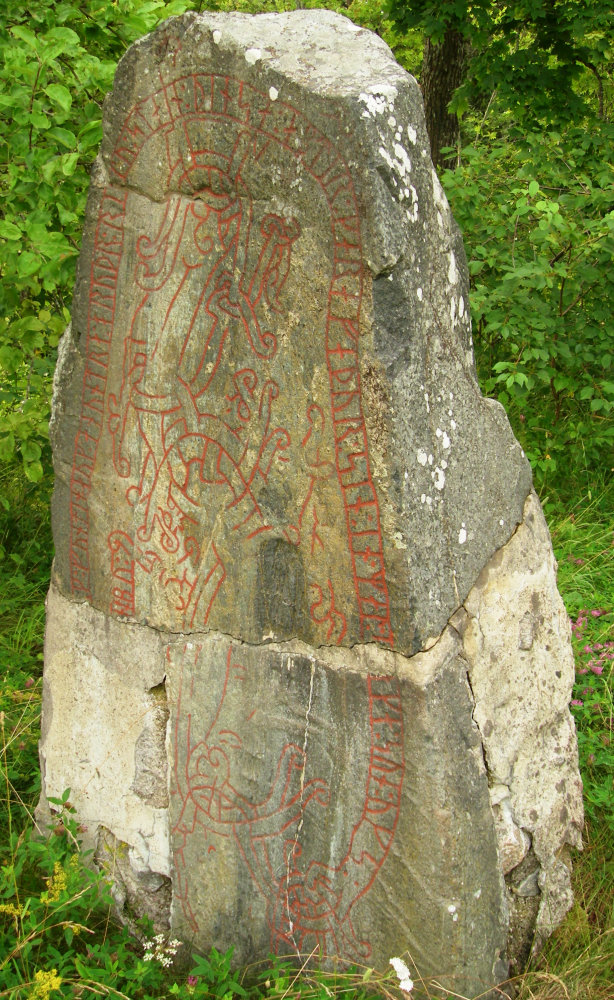
Second view of U 1146.

The runic text states that the stone is a memorial raised by three brothers Ráðulfr, Fundinn, and Ǫnundr in memory of their father Kári, who is called "the Eloquent." Kári is also described as being the son of Uggr of Svanabýr, which is the modern village of Svanby which is located about 3 kilometers southwest of Gillberga. Although the runic text has been damaged, the complete text is known from a drawing of the inscription made during the surveys of runestones conducted in Sweden in the 17th century.

== Inscription ==
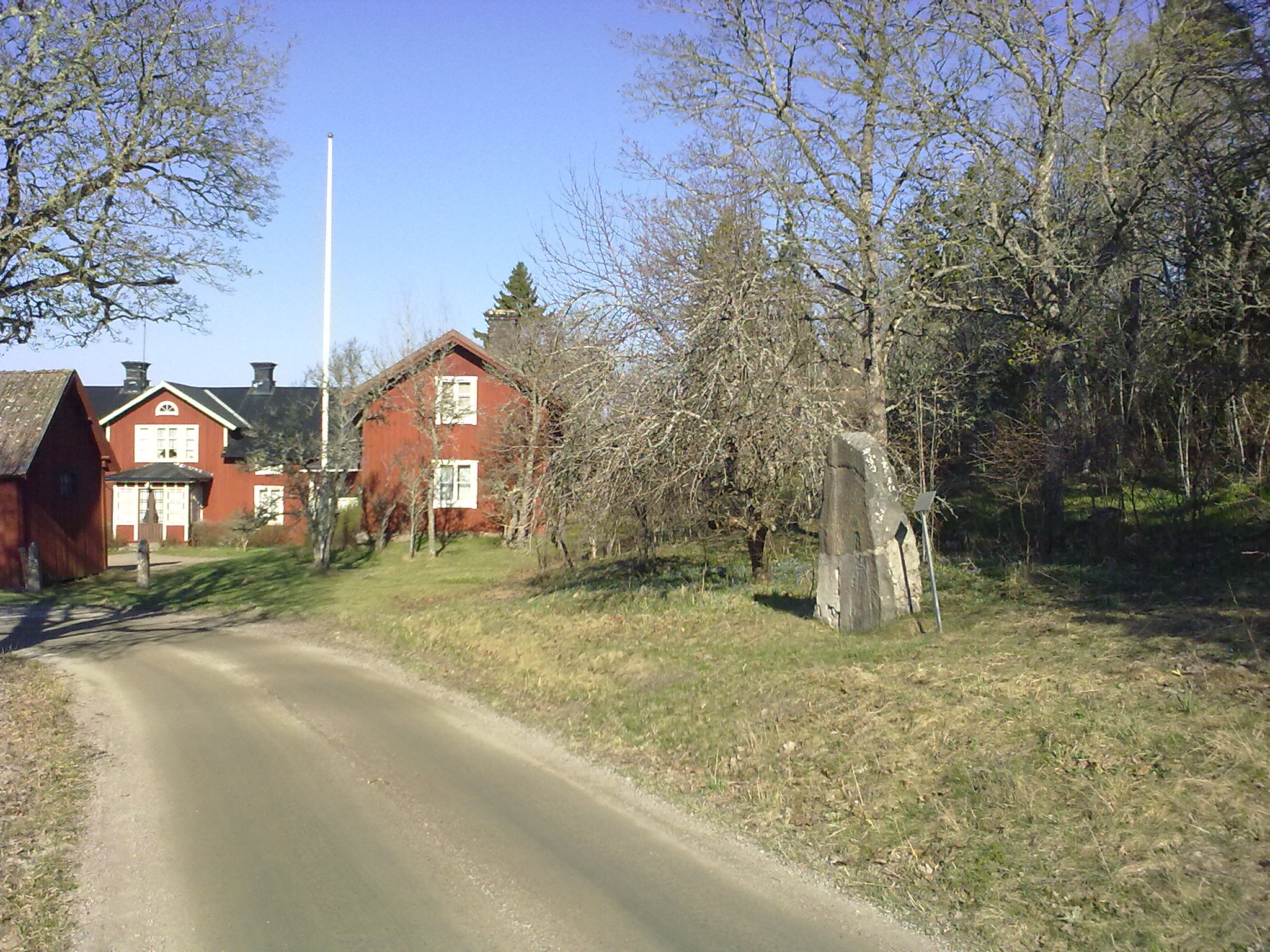
U 1146 surroundings.

=== Transliteration of the runes into Latin characters ===
[raþulfr : (a)](u)k : funtin : auk : a(n)untra : bruþr : ritu : stain : þinsa : abtir : kara : faþur : sin : in : mal:s[b]aka : sun : uks : [i * sua]n[o]bu :

=== Transcription into Old Norse ===
Raðulfʀ ok Fundinn ok Anundr, brøðr, rettu stæin þennsa æftiʀ Kara, faður sinn, hinn malspaka, sun Uggs i Svanaby.

=== Translation in English ===
Ráðulfr and Fundinn and Ǫnundr, the brothers erected this stone in memory of Kári the Eloquent, their father, the son of Uggr of Svanabýr.

== See also ==
- List of runestones
