= Furnace, Ceredigion =

Village in Ceredigion, Wales

Coordinates: 52.53803°N 3.94092°W

Furnace: Welsh: Ffwrnais
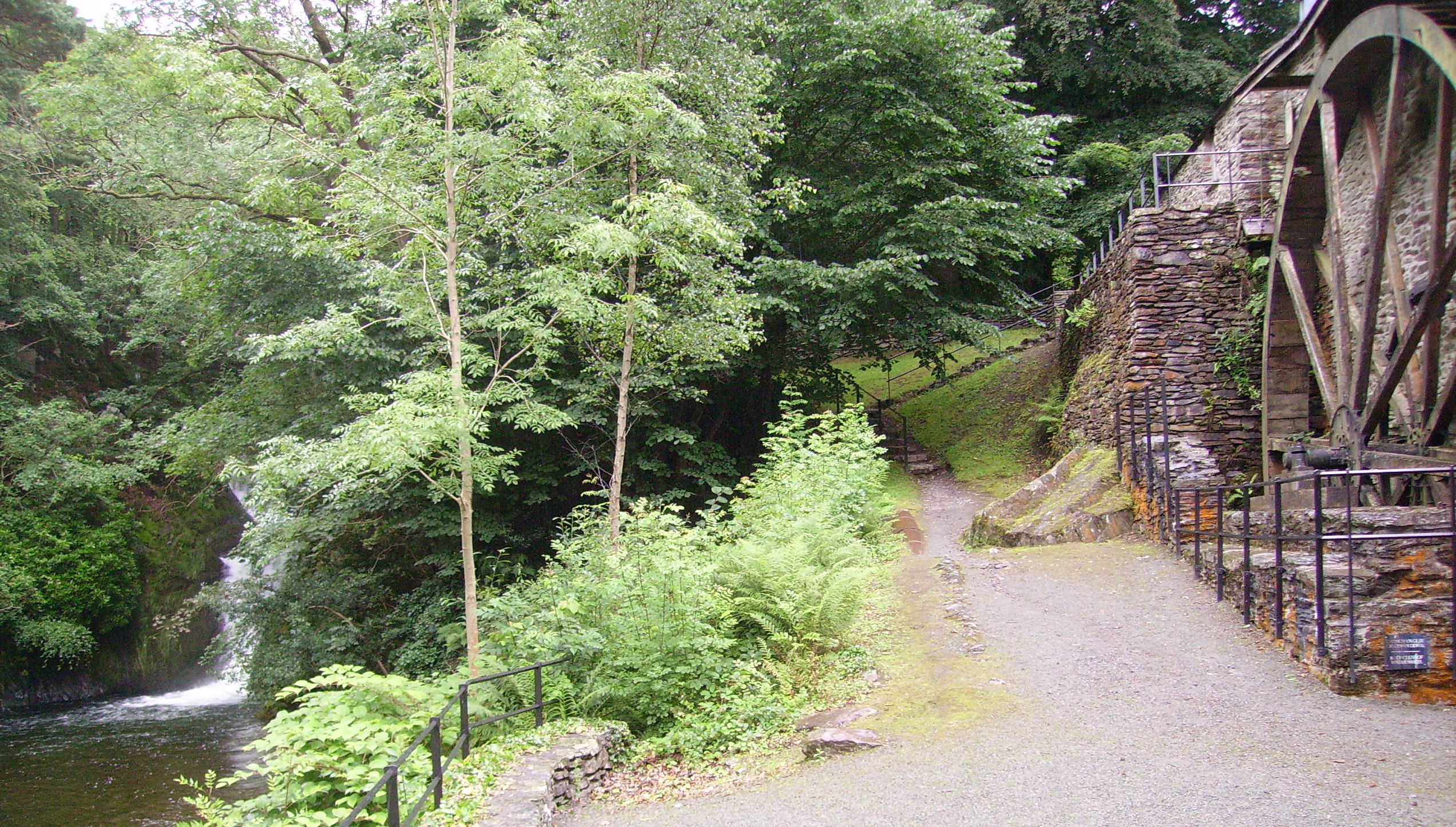
- Dyfi Furnace

- Location within Ceredigion
- OS grid reference: SN684951
- Principal area: Ceredigion
- Preserved county: Dyfed
- Country: Wales
- Sovereign state: United Kingdom
- Post town: MACHYNLLETH
- Postcode district: SY20
- Dialling code: 01654
- Police: Dyfed-Powys
- Fire: Mid and West Wales
- Ambulance: Welsh
- UK Parliament: Ceredigion Preseli
- Senedd Cymru – Welsh Parliament: Ceredigion Penfro

Furnace (Welsh: Ffwrnais) is a hamlet in Ceredigion, Wales on the A487 trunk road from Machynlleth to Aberystwyth, near Eglwysfach.

It is the location of the Dyfi Furnace, used from the 1750s to the 19th century to make pig iron with charcoal as fuel. The site had been used by the Silver Mills of the Society of Mines Royal.
