= Uppland Runic Inscription 1145 =

Coordinates: 60.2666°N 17.4566°E

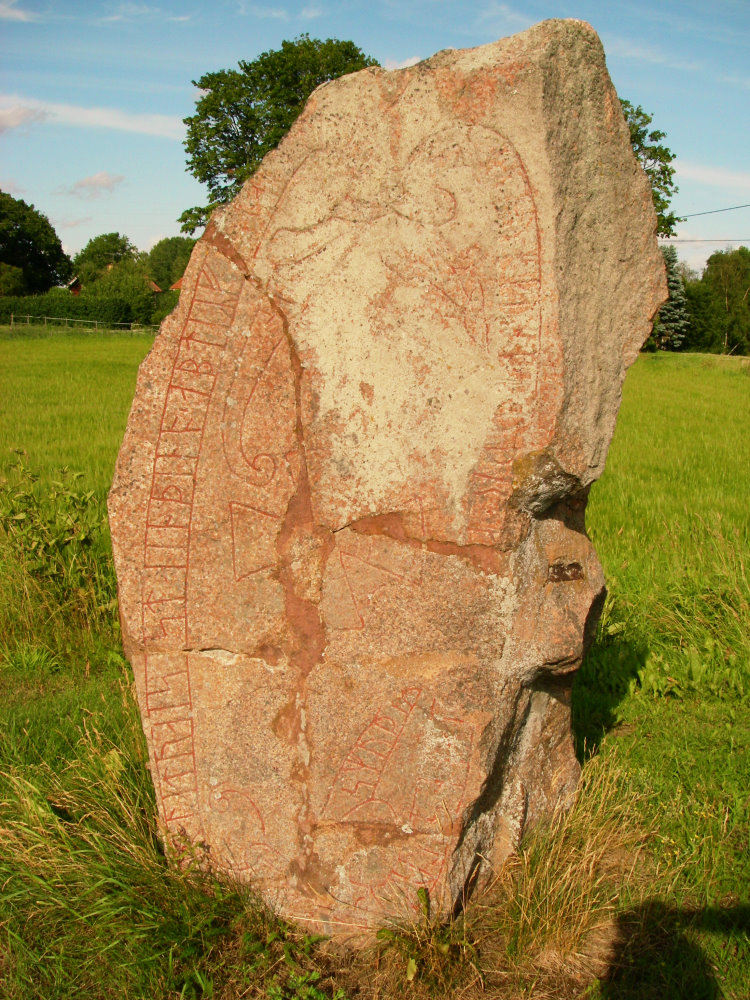
Runestone U 1145 near Tierp

Uppland Runic Inscription 1145, or U 1145 in the Rundata catalog, is a Viking Age memorial runestone that is located near the town of Tierp in Uppland, Sweden.

== Description ==
U 1145, which consists of a serpent that circles a cross, is classified as being carved in either runestone style Pr2 or Pr3. The text states that Ríkr and Gunnthrúðr raised the stone in memory of Fasti. The text ends in a prayer which uses the Norse word salu for soul, which was borrowed from English and was first used in another inscription during the tenth century. The runes in the prayer follow the rule that double letters are represented with only a single rune, even if one of the two letters are at the end of one word and the second is at the beginning of the next word. In U 1145 this rule applies to four consecutive words in the prayer, which are written as honsalukuþs on the stone. The transliteration of the runic text for these words in the prayer, hons| |salu| |uk| |kuþs, shown below shows word divisions and a separate s, u, and k rune for each of the words.

== Inscription ==
=== Transliteration of the runes into Latin characters ===
: r(i)kr ' lit raisa stain þino ' abtiʀ fasta faþur sin auk þauh kunþruþr ' k[uþ hial]bi hons| |salu| |uk| |kuþs muþiʀ

=== Transcription into Old Norse ===
Rikʀ let ræisa stæin þenna æftiʀ Fasta, faður sinn, ok þau Gunnþruðr. Guð hialpi hans salu ok Guðs moðiʀ.

=== Translation in English ===
Ríkr had this stone raised in memory of Fasti, his father, and Gunnthrúðr (also raised). May God and God's mother help his soul.

== See also ==
- List of runestones
