= Taynuilt Shinty Club =

Scottish shinty team

Taynuilt
- Full name: Taynuilt Shinty Club
- Gaelic name: Comann Camanachd Taigh an Uillt
- Founded: 1905/2008
- Ground: Taynuilt Shinty Pitch, Taynuilt
- Manager: Dave Thompson
- League: South Division One
- 2016: 4th
Home

Taynuilt Shinty Club is a shinty team based in Taynuilt, Scotland. The club has existed in several different forms most recently in junior form but has reformed and won South Division Two in 2009.

== History ==
Taynuilt has a history of abeyance although the sport has strong historical roots in the area. There was side in the village originally called Ben Cruachan founded in 1905. The first known Taynuilt side competed in the Sutherland Cup in 1935. A Taynuilt side was also active in the 1970s and 1980s but went into abeyance at senior level in 1990.

The club was linked at junior level with Glenorchy Camanachd in recent years but decided to go out on its own.

The village shinty pitch has been used several times as a completely neutral venue for semi-finals and finals.

Gary Innes appeared in a Taynuilt top at Runrig’s Beat the Drum concert in 2007 wearing a Taynuilt strip as on the cover of the album Everything You See, Innes’ Fort William strip was altered to Taynuilt colours to match the colour scheme of the album artwork and because the photographer, Stewart MacKenzie played shinty for an incarnation of Taynuilt.

Taynuilt had a strong comeback season, including a 4–0 defeat of Bute Shinty Club. In 2009, the recently retired Fraser Inglis, formerly of Oban Camanachd and Kingussie became a coach. Taynuilt marked a successful return to senior shinty by winning South Division Two in 2009 with a flawless record.

Their expansion since rejoining the league gathered apace as they created a second team to enter the Bullough and Sutherland cups in 2010. 2010 also saw Taynuilt's first ever match in the Camanachd Cup, a 5–0 loss to Kilmallie on 24 April. They reached the second round of the Camanachd Cup in 2011, defeating Inverness then facing Kingussie, where they exited 8–1, although they opened the scoring.

Taynuilt even has foreign connections as they have a player from Africa, Iain Macdonald, but the club will have to develop further without Fraser Inglis as coaching guru as he stepped down for the 2012 season which will see Taynuilt compete in the MacAulay Cup for the first time.

The club made history in 2012 by reaching the final of the Glasgow Celtic Society Cup for the first time. Taynuilt took advantage of the strongest teams in the tournament being in the other side of the draw to advance to the final at Strachur. Oban Celtic were defeated 3–2 in the quarter-final before Taynuilt saw off Aberdour 4–1 in the semi-final. Unfortunately the team was to make further history in the final as they were thrashed by a record 14–0 scoreline by Inveraray.

In 2022, Taynuilt combined with Glenorchy at senior level to field a team as Cruachanside.
