= Killskär =

Coordinates: 60°34′00″N 018°01′00″E

Killskär is a populated place in Tierp Municipality, in Uppsala County of Sweden.
