= Taynuilt =

Coordinates: 56.4307°N 5.2386°W

Taynuilt: Scottish Gaelic: Taigh an Uillt
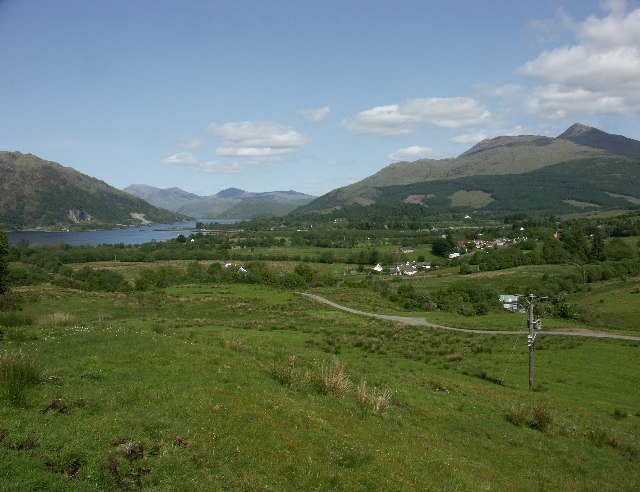
- View of Taynuilt and Airds Bay from near Balindore

- Location within Argyll and Bute
- Population: 800
- OS grid reference: NN004312
  - Edinburgh: 85 miles (137 km) ESE
  - London: 398 miles (641 km) SSE
- Council area: Argyll and Bute
- Lieutenancy area: Argyll and Bute
- Country: Scotland
- Sovereign state: United Kingdom
- Post town: TAYNUILT
- Postcode district: PA35
- Dialling code: 01866
- Police: Scotland
- Fire: Scottish
- Ambulance: Scottish
- UK Parliament: Argyll, Bute and South Lochaber
- Scottish Parliament: Argyll and Bute

Taynuilt (Scots: [ˈtəinəlt]; Scottish Gaelic: Taigh an Uillt [ˈt̪ʰɤj ən̪ˠ ˈɯiʎtʲ], meaning 'the House by the Stream') is a large village in Argyll and Bute, Scotland located at the western entrance to the narrow Pass of Brander.

== Location ==
The village is situated on the River Nant about a kilometre before the river flows into Loch Etive at Airds Bay. This is just to the west of a narrowing of the loch down to about 200 m (660 ft). The larger River Awe passes about 1 km to the east of the village and joins the loch just to the east of the narrow point. The West Highland Line and A85 road pass through the village.

== History ==
The narrows form a natural crossing to Bonawe on the north shore, and for centuries the village was a staging post and resting place for travellers. A small hill immediately to the east of the main street of the village was the site of Killespickerill, which was built in 1228 as the seat of the Bishop of Argyll. Some of its ruins were incorporated into Muckairn Parish Church, built in 1829. On the north shore of Loch Etive more extensive ruins remain of Ardchattan Priory, which was founded in 1230. In 1308 it was the venue for the last Scottish Parliament held in Gaelic. A regular ferry service ran to Bonawe from 1690.

In 1753 the Bonawe Iron Furnace was constructed by the Newland Company, later known as Harrison Ainslie. It stood just to the north of the village, between the rivers Nant and Awe, making use of timber from the local forests for charcoal fuel to smelt iron ore brought by sea from England. Although small in comparison to the huge 'hot-melt' furnaces of the 19th century, the furnace provided work not only at the site of the smelter but also for up to 600 charcoal burners over a large area of local woodlands. The effects of coppicing trees for charcoal burning can still be seen in local woods where, for a time, during the early part of the 20th century, birch brooms for use in steel mills were manufactured. The furnace was of such strategic importance that in 1756 a military road was constructed, crossing the Pass of Brander and the Bridge of Awe to reach the furnace. Twenty years afterwards the road was extended westward to Connel, and later still on to Oban. The factory produced 42,000 cannonballs in 1781. Closed in 1876, the furnace is still substantially complete and is a tourist attraction in the care of Historic Scotland.

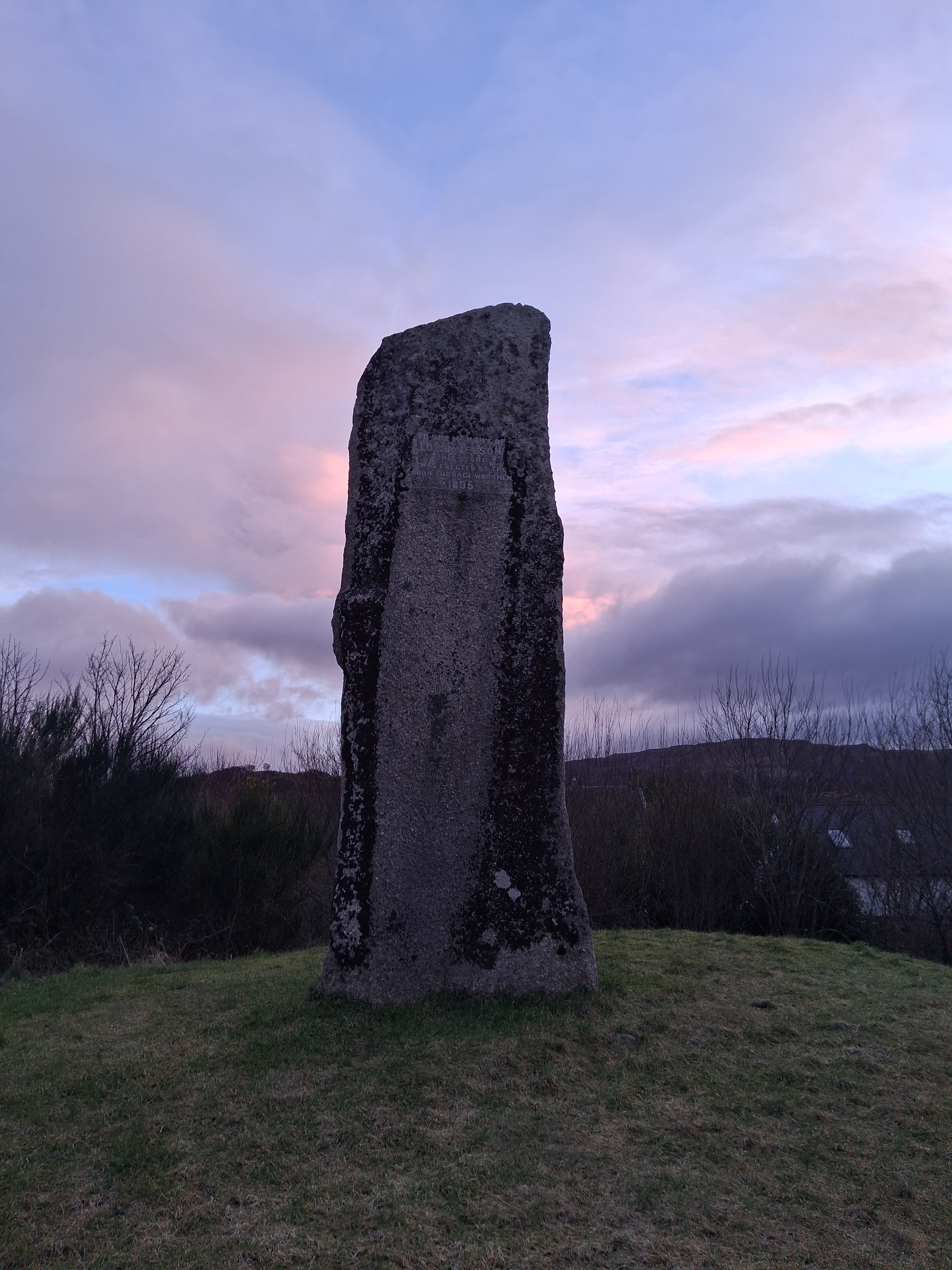
Nelson Monument

What is claimed to have been the first monument to be erected in Britain to commemorate the death of Nelson at the Battle of Trafalgar stands at Taynuilt with an inscription dated 1805 on its base, a reminder of the wide popularity of Nelson and of the many Scots crew and captains at the battle.

The Callander and Oban Railway opened Taynuilt railway station in 1880, making the village a popular place for tourists visiting the Scottish Highlands. The ferry service across Loch Etive to Bonawe eventually became a car ferry. Connel Bridge, which had been built to carry the railway over tidal rapids the mouth of the loch, with cars later sharing it as a toll bridge, was converted to being a road bridge when the railway was closed. The Taynuilt to Bonawe ferry closed in 1966.

Taynuilt war memorial was erected in 1920 to a design by Sir Robert Lorimer.

== Facilities ==
Taynuilt has two main beaches. Airds Bay is a pebble bay with views to the Duirinnis hill and Bonawe. Kelly's Pier has both old and new parts, with a sweep of pebble beach as well, where small craft can be launched. From the loch there are panoramic views of the loch, Bonawe, Ben Cruachan, and Connel.

The modern village has a population of about 800 and is separated into a number of neighbourhoods, including Kirkton, Ichrachan, Airds and Hafton. There are two council housing schemes, Cruachan Cottages and Achlonan. The main A85 road passes through the south of the village. Taynuilt Golf Club lies immediately to the northwest of the village and enjoys scenic views over Airds Bay. Taynuilt Shinty Club plays in the village and Taynuilt Youth Pipe Band proves to be very popular. Other amenities include a village hall, a post office, a doctor's surgery with a pharmacy, and a grocery shop. Shops that have since closed include a toy shop, the tea room and the butcher's. A bakery and coffee shop are about to be opened.

Taynuilt Primary School and Early Learning Centre serves the village and surrounding area.

== Notable people ==
- Karen Matheson and Donald Shaw of the folk group Capercaillie are from Taynuilt.
- Dr Alexander Carmichael, the author of Carmina Gadelica, lived in Taynuilt in the early 1900s.
