= Månkarbo =

- Location within Uppsala Location within Sweden
- Coordinates: 60°14′N 17°28′E
- Country: Sweden
- Province: Uppland
- County: Uppsala County
- Municipality: Tierp Municipality

Area
  - Total: 0.91 km^{2} (0.35 sq mi)

Population (31 December 2020)
  - Total: 645
  - Density: 710/km^{2} (1,800/sq mi)
- Time zone: UTC+1 (CET)
  - Summer (DST): UTC+2 (CEST)

Månkarbo is a locality situated in Tierp Municipality, Uppsala County, Sweden with 666 inhabitants in 2010.
