= Prior of Ardchattan =

The Prior of Ardchattan (later Commendator of Ardchattan) was the head of the Valliscaulian, and then Cistercian, monastic community of Ardchattan Priory, Argyll. It was founded in 1230 by Duncan MacDougal, Lord of Argyll. In April 1510 it was incorporated as a cell of Beauly Priory. It was annexed to the bishopric of the Isles in 1615. The following are a list of abbots and commendators:

== List of priors ==
- Peter, 1296
- Martin Filani, 1371-1395
- Maurice, 1395 x 1425
- Patrick, 1425
- Duncan MacDougall, 1489
- Dugall MacDougall, 1491
- Eugenius MacDougall, 1500
- Duncan Macarthur, 1508-1544
- John Campbell, 1538-1544

== List of commendators ==
- Neil Campbell, 1544
- John Campbell (again), 1545–1580 "In 1558 John Campbell became Prior of Ardchattan, he was succeeded by his son Alexander in 1580, but during these troubled years of religious dissension the number of monks dwindled and the Priory become a private dwelling house."
- Alexander Campbell, 1580–1602

== Bibliography ==
- Cowan, Ian B. & Easson, David E., Medieval Religious Houses: Scotland With an Appendix on the Houses in the Isle of Man, Second Edition, (London, 1976), p. 83
- Watt, D.E.R. & Shead, N.F. (eds.), The Heads of Religious Houses in Scotland from the 12th to the 16th Centuries, The Scottish Records Society, New Series, Volume 24, (Edinburgh, 2001), pp. 10–1

== See also ==
- Ardchattan Priory
- Clan Chattan
