= Glenorchy Camanachd =

Shinty team from Dalmally, Scotland

Glenorchy
- Full name: Glenorchy Camanachd
- Gaelic name: Comann Camanachd Ghleann Urachaidh
- Nickname: Orchy
- Founded: 1947/1965
- Ground: Mart Park, Dalmally
- Manager: Keith MacIntyre
- League: South Division One
- 2016: 7th
- League: In Abeyance
Home	Away

Glenorchy Camanachd is a shinty club from Dalmally, Scotland. In 2022, Glenorchy combined with Taynuilt at senior level to field a team as Cruachanside.

== History ==
Old letters and poetry show that organised shinty was played in Dalmally in and about 1880. These games were played by teams from each side of the River Orchy for a cup presented by a Mr Macdonald, who had returned from Australia. The contests took place on New Year's Day and continued up to 1932. While the game continued to be played in the district, it was not until 1947 that Glenorchy Camanachd was formed.

After a period of some success in the 1950s, a severe shortage of players forced the club to fold in 1960 but it was re-formed in 1965 and has played continuously since then.

As a junior team the Munro Shield was won in 1952 and 1959, the Campbell Cup in 1958, the Bullough Cup in 1973 and the Sutherland Cup in 1990. As a senior team the South League Championship was won in 1990.

Events which gave satisfaction were the winning of the Munro Shield in 1952, the club's first trophy, the winning of the Bullough Cup in 1973, the first triumph after a period of fifteen years, the winning of the Sutherland Cup and the championship of Division I in 1990. The club won its first senior cup with the Glasgow Celtic Society Cup being raised in 1998.

They also won the South First Division Championship in 1999, and achieved Premier league status in the same year with a solid performance in a two leg playoff against Caberfeidh. In 2007, Glenorchy narrowly missed out on promotion to the Premier League but won the South Division 1 title with 2 games to spare in 2008 to seal their return to the Premier League. Glenorchy's 2nd team also had a good 2008 finishing 2nd in South Division 2.

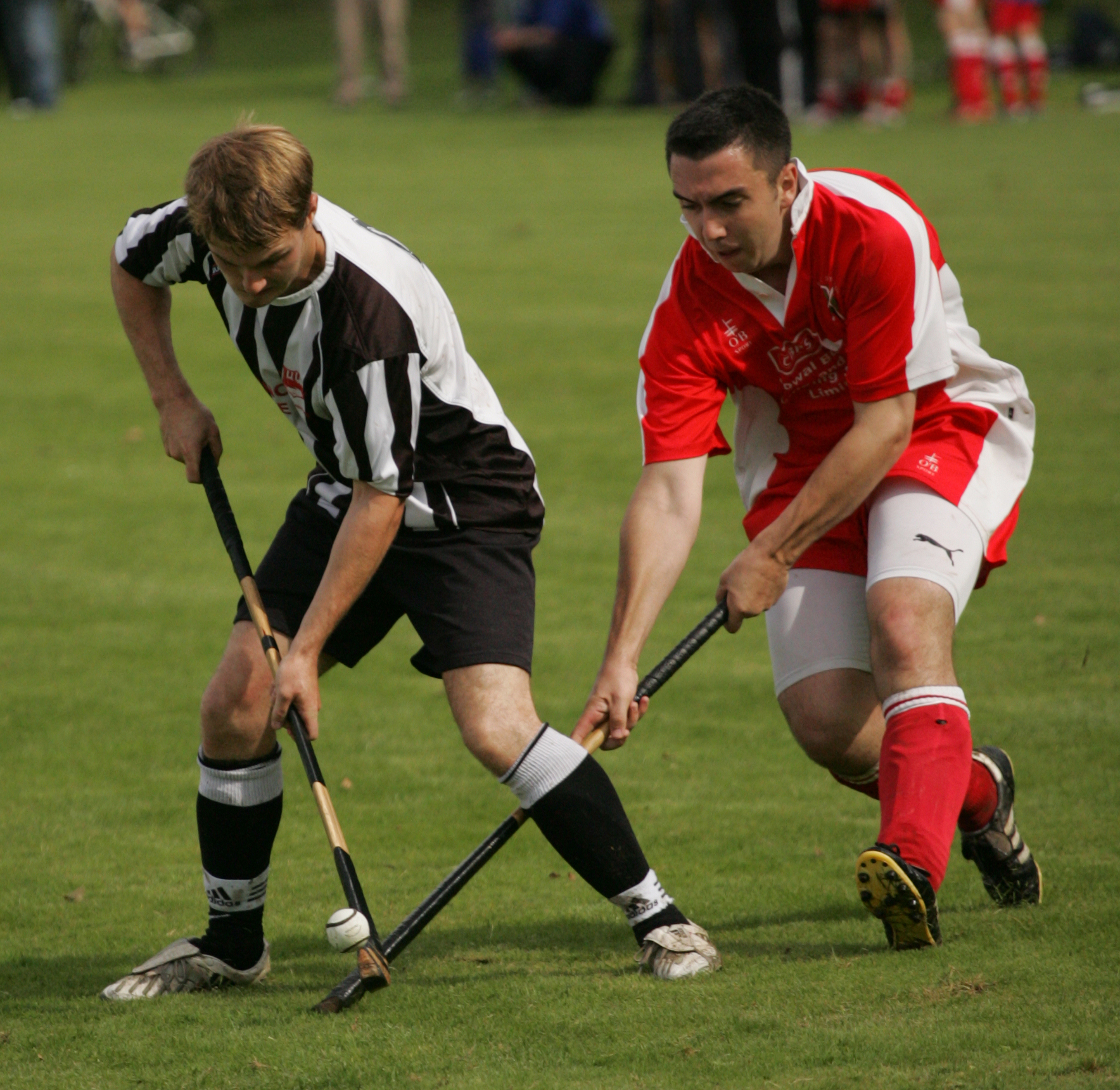
Glenorchy Vs Bute

Glenorchy has always been a small but enthusiastic village team which has had a struggle to remain sound financially. Of notable personalities connected with shinty in Glenorchy, there are Donnie MacDougall who got the club going again in 1966 and Mr and Mrs Kenny Campbell who did so much to encourage and coach boys at school. The club supports two junior shinty clubs, at Dalmally and Taynuilt in local first shinty leagues, who come together as Cruachanside to play in National Competition.

The club were relegated to South One in 2009 after a season where they lost 13–0 to Kingussie Camanachd and finished bottom of the league. The club disbanded its second team in 2010.

The club bounced back to the Premier with an undefeated championship season in South Division One in 2010. The 2011 was one of unstinting horror at league level with Orchy failing to win a game and not breaching double figures in terms of goals scored.

Orchy played in the re-established National Division One in 2014 after finishing third in South Division One in 2013. The club fielded a second team for the first time in several years in 2014. However, the club pulled out of National Division One in 2015 due to feeling they did not have the resources to compete at that level.

In 2022, Glenorchy combined with Taynuilt at senior level to create Cruachanside.

== Difficulties with Park ==
Home games are played at the Mart Park, Dalmally, and there are changing facilities at the Auction Market there. Apart from a pitch at Craig Farm when the Mart pitch was flooded, all home games since 1947 have been played at the Mart Park. The suitability of the stadium for the Premier League was questioned by some in the Premier league as Glenorchy made the step up in 2009. Whether or not the issues were addressed is uncertain, but Glenorchy did not suffer as many postponements as Kyles Athletic or other South clubs.

== Famous Players ==
- Magnus MacFarlane-Barrow, OBE, founder of Mary's Meals.
