= Tierp Municipality =

Tierp Municipality Tierps kommun
- Municipality
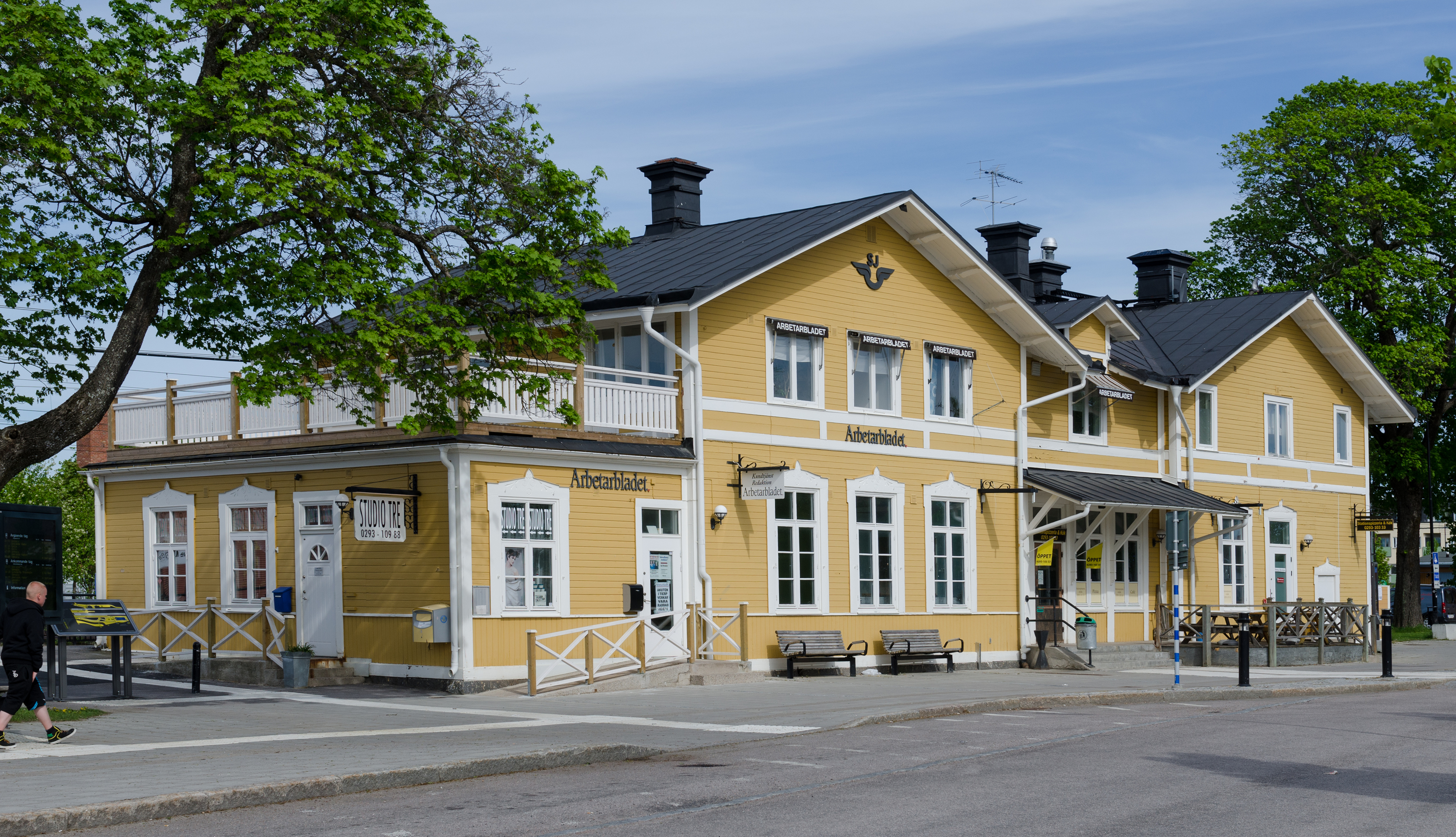
- Tierp Train Station

- Coat of arms

- Coordinates: 60°20′N 17°30′E
- Country: Sweden
- County: Uppsala County
- Seat: Tierp

Area
  - Total: 2,573.82 km^{2} (993.76 sq mi)
  - Land: 1,547.78 km^{2} (597.60 sq mi)
  - Water: 1,026.04 km^{2} (396.16 sq mi)
- Area as of 1 January 2014.

Population (30 June 2025)
  - Total: 21,062
  - Density: 13.608/km^{2} (35.244/sq mi)
- Time zone: UTC+1 (CET)
  - Summer (DST): UTC+2 (CEST)
- ISO 3166 code: SE
- Province: Uppland and Gästrikland
- Website: www.tierp.se

Tierp Municipality (Swedish: Tierps kommun) is a municipality in Uppsala County in east central Sweden. Its seat is located in the town of Tierp.

== Localities ==
Localities in Tierp Municipality include:

- Karlholmsbruk
- Killskär
- Månkarbo
- Mehedeby
- Örbyhus
- Skärplinge
- Söderfors
- Tierp (seat)
- Tobo
- Upplanda

== Demographics ==
This is a demographic table based on Tierp Municipality's electoral districts in the 2022 Swedish general election sourced from SVT's election platform, in turn taken from SCB official statistics.

In total there were 21,459 residents, including 16,185 Swedish citizens of voting age. 49.2% voted for the left coalition and 49.5% for the right coalition. Indicators are in percentage points except population totals and income.

Location	Residents	Citizen adults	Left vote	Right vote	Employed	Swedish parents	Foreign heritage	Income SEK	Degree
Location			%	%					
Hållnäs	995	847	49.9	49.0	84	93	7	22,575	27
Kyrkbyn	1,201	910	38.1	60.4	86	91	9	25,880	23
Månkarbo	1,309	1,013	41.9	56.2	85	91	9	25,736	28
Skärplinge	1,768	1,417	46.7	52.7	83	92	8	22,515	26
Svanby	1,659	1,238	55.7	43.2	77	72	28	21,192	25
Söderfors	2,412	1,668	53.6	45.3	68	71	29	21,953	24
Tierps köping N	1,423	1,149	49.8	49.4	81	88	12	25,748	30
Tierps köping S	1,858	1,330	55.5	42.0	71	63	37	18,566	25
Tobo	1,203	815	46.8	51.8	77	80	20	23,167	25
Vallskoga	1,979	1,485	49.4	49.8	84	87	13	26,232	32
Vendel	1,065	816	38.4	60.5	88	93	7	27,152	28
Västland-Karlholm	1,962	1,540	49.3	49.4	78	88	12	22,375	23
Örbyhus NO	1,263	983	53.3	45.5	84	90	10	25,561	32
Örbyhus SV	1,362	974	55.4	42.7	79	82	18	21,999	29
Source: SVT
