= Ardchattan Priory =

Former monastic house in Argyll, Scotland

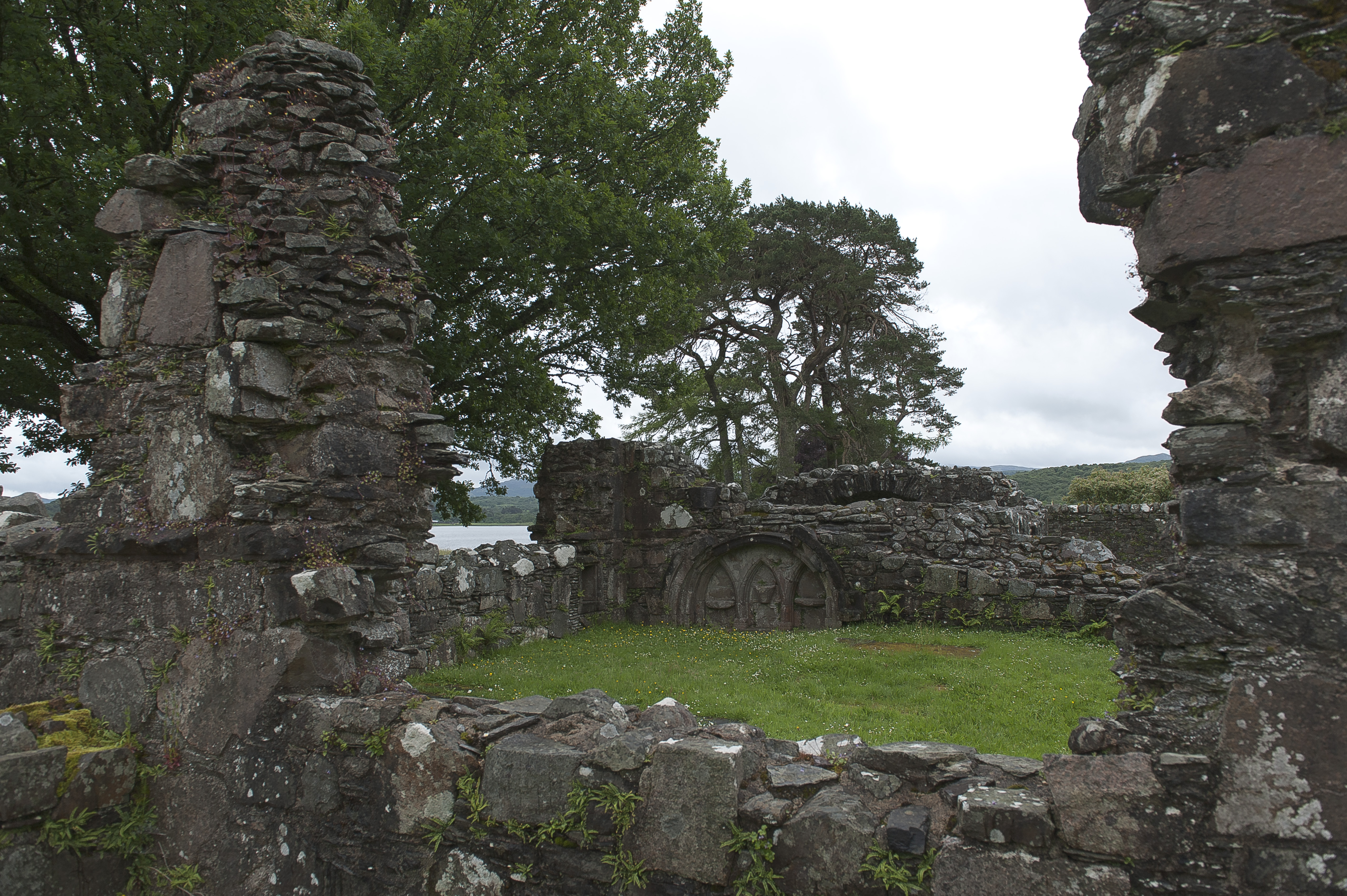
- Ardchattan Priory choir
- Interactive map of Ardchattan Priory

Monastery information
- Order: Canons Regular
- Established: 1230
- Controlled churches: Christian

Site
- Location: Ardchattan, Argyll
- Coordinates: 56°27′45″N 5°17′40″W

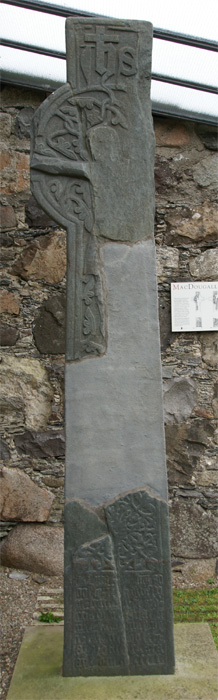
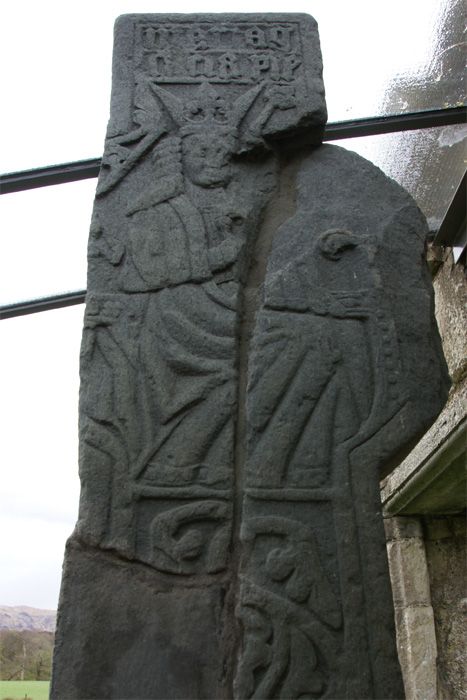
MacDougall Cross, commissioned by Prior Eugenius MacDougall in 1500; front (left) and back (right)

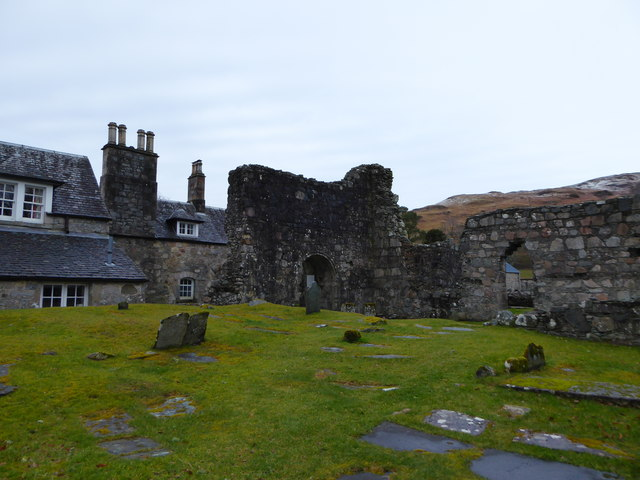
The choir and screen.

Ardchattan Priory was a Valliscaulian monastic community in Ardchattan, Argyll, Scotland.

== History ==
The Priory was founded in 1230 by Duncan MacDougall, Lord of Argyll. The most widely believed origin of Clan Chattan is that Clan MacDougall appointed Gillichattan Mor as the Ballie or protector of the Priory lands on their behalf.

In 1308, Robert the Bruce's campaign in the area included holding a council of local chiefs at the Priory, which is believed to have been the last Gaelic-speaking parliament in Scotland.

From the early 14th century, the Prior of Ardchattan held the chantership of Lismore Cathedral.

In April 1510 the Priory was incorporated as a cell of Beauly Priory and may have become Cistercian, but the evidence is slight. It was annexed to the bishopric of the Isles in 1615.

The Priory passed into the hands of Clan Campbell in the 16th century who converted the south range of the conventual buildings into a private dwelling house, and the choir and transepts of the church were used for parochial worship. The monastic church fell into disuse, except for the purpose of burial, following the erection of a new parish church in 1731–2. The priory church was then quarried for stone and is now heavily ruined.

== Priory ==
The priory church was cruciform in plan, with a small 13th century nave and transepts and a much larger 15th century choir. The remains are complicated by two 17th-century burial enclosures which abut them. The stone screen separating the choir from the rest of the church survives, while a tomb chest and piscina survive further east. The nave has largely vanished, but had a narrow north aisle. The remains also shelter a number of carved stones. To the south of the church was a cloister fifteen by sixteen metres, now largely built over by the later house. The 15th century refectory is the only claustral building to survive, though it was subdivided in 1713. The vaulted refectory pulpit survives and was restored in 1960. The Priory structure, the burial ground and the carved stones have been collectively designated a scheduled monument by Historic Environment Scotland.

== Gardens ==
The monks would have had a garden for practical purposes, but the fine site, with views over Loch Etive, Ben Cruachan and the hills of Mull, was recognised and developed with the house in the early 17th century, the date of some of the oldest trees on the estate. Most of the present garden was created in the 19th and 20th centuries.

The neutral soil and temperate climate allow a wide variety of plants to thrive, as well as over thirty varieties of trees, such as a huge Cornus kousa, Eucryphia glutinosa, and Hoheria lyalii as well as with scented roses and philadelphus. There are two main sections to the gardens: a woodland garden from the 1960s and an older formal garden near the priory. Shrub walks lead off the main drive of the garden. A wild flower meadow planted under a variety of sorbus trees is a more recent addition. The lawns are bordered by herbaceous beds, roses and a rockery. In addition, there is a walled kitchen garden. The gardens are surrounded by Picturesque parkland, with clumps of trees as well as woodland.

The gardens are also listed by Historic Environment Scotland because of their high historical, horticultural and scenic value.

== Yew Trees ==
The priory's yew trees (Taxus baccata) were allegedly inspected by Robert the Bruce and cut to make at least some of the longbows used at the Battle of Bannockburn.

== Burials ==
- Séon Carsuel

== Bibliography ==
- Cowan, Ian B. & Easson, David E., Medieval Religious Houses: Scotland With an Appendix on the Houses in the Isle of Man, Second Edition, (London, 1976), p. 83
- Watt, D.E.R. & Shead, N.F. (eds.), The Heads of Religious Houses in Scotland from the 12th to the 16th Centuries, The Scottish Records Society, New Series, Volume 24, (Edinburgh, 2001), pp. 10–1

== See also ==
- Prior of Ardchattan
- Clan MacDougall
- Clan Chattan
- Clan Campbell
- Donnchadh of Argyll
