= Harrison Ainslie =

British firm of ironmasters and iron ore merchants

The firm of Harrison Ainslie & Co. was a British firm of ironmasters and iron ore merchants, selling high quality haematite from their mines on Lindal Moor to smelters in Glasgow, Scotland, South Wales and the Midlands. From a 21st-century perspective, they are more interesting as the last operators of charcoal-fired blast furnaces in Great Britain. Their furnaces were stone-built, water-powered, and much smaller than the coke-fired furnaces of the same era.

== Managers ==
At various times the company was known as Richard Ford & Co, the Newland Co, George Knott & Co, Knott, Ainslie & Co, Harrison Ainslie & Co, Harrison Ainslie, Roper & Co, and finally as Harrison Ainslie & Co Ltd. Associated companies were the Hampshire Haematite Iron Co, Melfort Gunpowder Co, Lorn Furnace Co and Barrow & Ulverston Rope Co.

Newland Furnace was built in 1747 by Richard Ford, William Ford, Michael Knott and James Backhouse. Richard Ford was born in Middlewich in 1697. He was active in the Furness iron industry from 1722 as manager of Cunsey forge and a partner in Nibthwaite furnace. William Ford was his son. The partnership agreement at Nibthwaite prevented Richard Ford from building an ironworks within 10 miles, so the lease was taken in the name of his sister, Agnes Bordley. Agnes first bought Newland corn mill (still standing) to secure the water rights before applying to the Duke of Montagu for a lease on what is now the hamlet of Newland.

The company prospered under Richard Ford's management. James Backhouse's quarter share was worth £2000 when he sold it to William Ford in 1761. Richard Ford died in 1757. William Ford managed the company until his death in 1768. John Dixon was the managing partner from 1770 to 1775.

George Knott inherited Michael Knott's share of the company and married Catherine Ford. With a majority shareholding, he was managing partner from 1775 until his death in 1784.

Matthew Harrison was appointed sole manager in 1784. In 1812 he bought the Knott family's share of the company (19/32 or 59%) for £34,000.

Dr Henry Ainslie married Agnes Ford. He held shares in the company's ships, but his main career was as a London physician.

Matthew Harrison died in 1824, leaving the management of the company to Benson Harrison the elder.

Richard Roper, of Backbarrow, joined the company as a clerk in 1815. In 1820 he bought a share of the company. By the time of his death in 1860 he lived at Gawithfield and gave his occupation as "ironmaster". He was an active partner in the company, particularly as shipowner and shipping agent. There is conflicting evidence as to who ran the company after the death of Benson Harrison in 1863, but when William George Ainslie died in 1893, it was stated that he had for the past 30 years had the entire control and management of the firm's business. It was decided to turn Harrison Ainslie into a limited company in 1890, but it was 1893 before the limited company was formed. W G Ainslie was named as manager, but did not live to take an active part. The main shareholder in the limited company was Walter Dowson. He held 60% of the shares as trustee under the will of Benson Harrison. The limited company was in receivership in 1903.

The liquidator was Alfred Fell, author of "The Early iron industry in Furness". He sold the remaining assets to a new company, trading under the same name. The shareholders in the new company were Richard Edwin Killeen, James Saunders, James Murray, George B Court, George Ernest Bicknell, Thomas Henry Derbyshire, and Francis Cheers, most of whom were from Liverpool. The new company was in receivership in 1913. The receiver, James Morgan White, set up the Charcoal Iron Co which ran Backbarrow furnace until 1966.

== Developments 1850–1873 ==
The nature of the Furness iron industry changed dramatically in 1850 when Schneider & Davis discovered the large deposits of ore at Park. Henry Schneider turned his mind to building blast furnaces and CS Kennedy saw the prospects of the adjoining Roanhead royalty. The ore at Park and Roanhead occurred in large three-dimensional bodies (sops is the usual term). At Lindal Moor, the ore was in veins, flats and small pockets, much more expensive to work.

The first two furnaces at Barrow ironworks were blown in during 1859. In spite of an ever-increasing demand for phosphorus-free haematite for the Bessemer process, exports of Furness ore ceased about 1870. Harrison Ainslie's ships found other work and the railway took the ore to Hindpool.

The North Lonsdale Ironworks Company was established in 1873 with William George Ainslie as chairman and Myles Kennedy as vice chairman. With the Ainslie capital invested in a new, modern ironworks and a partner who owned fresh, efficient mines, the prospects for Harrison Ainslie & Co were now bleak.

== Mines ==
Richard Ford began partnerships in several mines in the Lindal and Marton area from 1746. The mines were expanded in 1799 when Knott, Ainslie & Co took the lease of the Muncaster royalty, near Lindal. Another large area of ground was gained in 1885 when the company spent £22,000 on the lease of Crossgates and Lindal Cote mines. These mines had been run down by the previous owners, Alexander Brogden's Ulverston Mining Co. Mine reports exist from 1881, and they are always severely critical of Harrison Ainslie's work.

== Transport ==
The company built the first pier at Barrow in 1780, and another at Greenodd in 1781. They built an ore quay on the Ulverston Canal about 1799. The Lancaster shipping registers record the ownership of vessels from 1786. Between 1786 and 1890 the company owned at least 25 ships entirely, but they held shares in many more. Most of their ships were bought new and sold long before they were worn out.

They owned a fleet of carts, for which they bred their own horses. In the steam age, the mines were served by narrow and standard-gauge railways.

== Blast furnaces ==
Newland Furnace was built in 1747. There were some modifications in 1854 and the furnace was converted to hot blast in 1873. It closed in 1891.

Bonawe Iron Furnace, Argyll, was built by the Newland Company in 1753. It worked until 1874.

Backbarrow Furnace was built in 1711 by Rawlinson, Machell and others, jointly known as the Backbarrow Company. The furnace stack was taken down in 1770 and replaced with a new one. It was bought by Harrison Ainslie in 1818. The blowing cylinders were operated by steam power in later years and the furnace fuelled by coke from 1921. It worked until 1966.

Duddon Furnace was built in 1736 by Kendall & Co, otherwise known as the Duddon Co. The Duddon company built the furnace at Argyll or Craleckan furnace in 1755. Craleckan furnace closed in 1813 but Duddon Furnace was bought by Harrison Ainslie in 1828. It worked until 1867, but according to one source, there was a final campaign in 1873 while Newland was under conversion to hot blast.

Warsash Furnace, Hampshire was built by Harrison Ainslie in 1868, more than 100 years later than any other charcoal blast furnace in Britain. It closed in 1877.

Dyfi Furnace, Cardiganshire, was built in 1755, by Kendall & Co., the owners of Duddon. It was not worked by Harrison Ainslie, but has many features in common with Newland, Bonawe, Craleckan and Duddon, namely:

- A battered (tapered) furnace stack, circular inside, built of stone and lined with firebrick.
- A blowing chamber uphill of the furnace driven by a waterwheel on the side of the blowing chamber.
- A charging house above the blowing chamber.
- Large charcoal barns uphill of the furnace stack.

All the blast furnaces mentioned except Warsash are still standing; Backbarrow was under restoration in 2019.

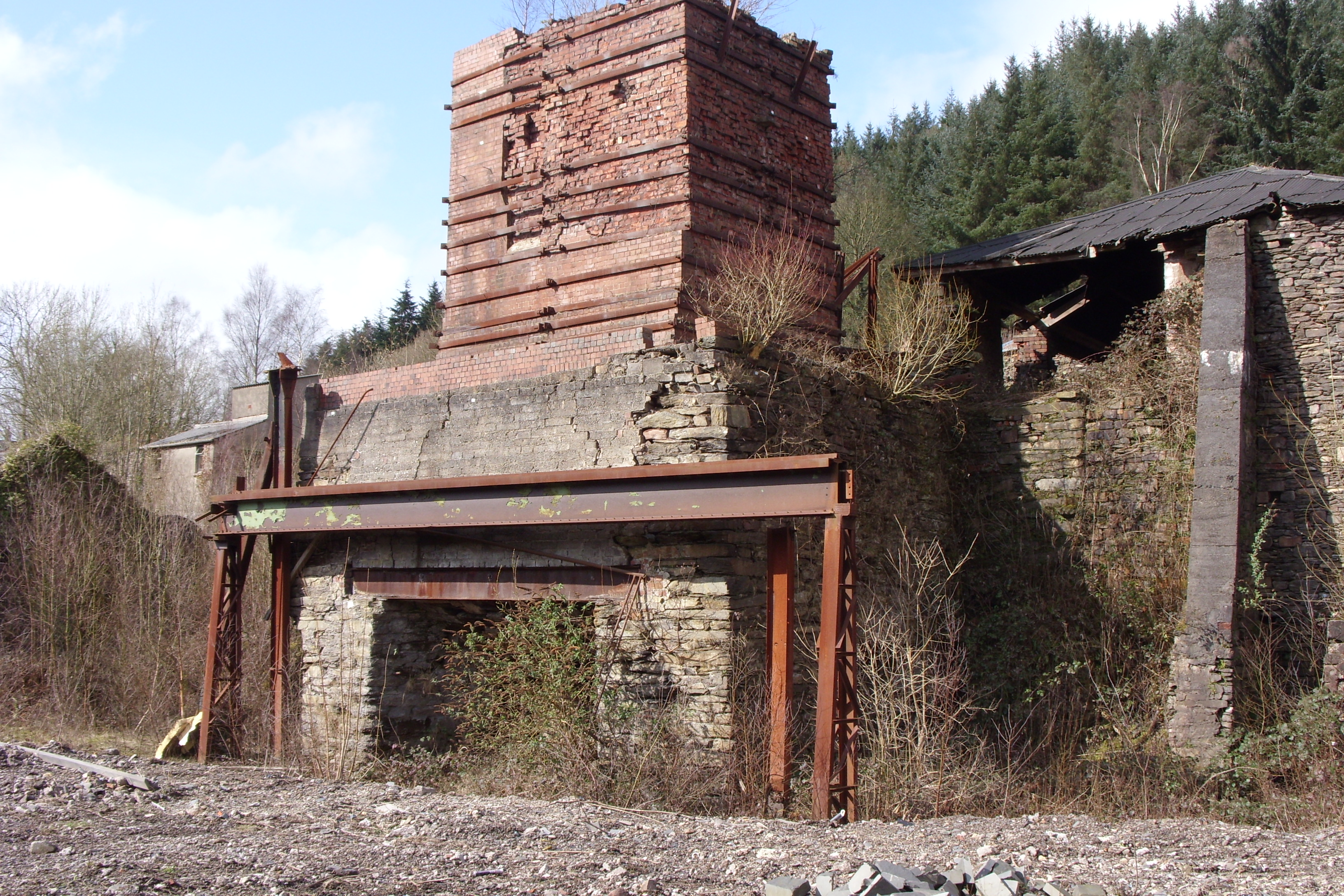
Backbarrow Furnace stack.

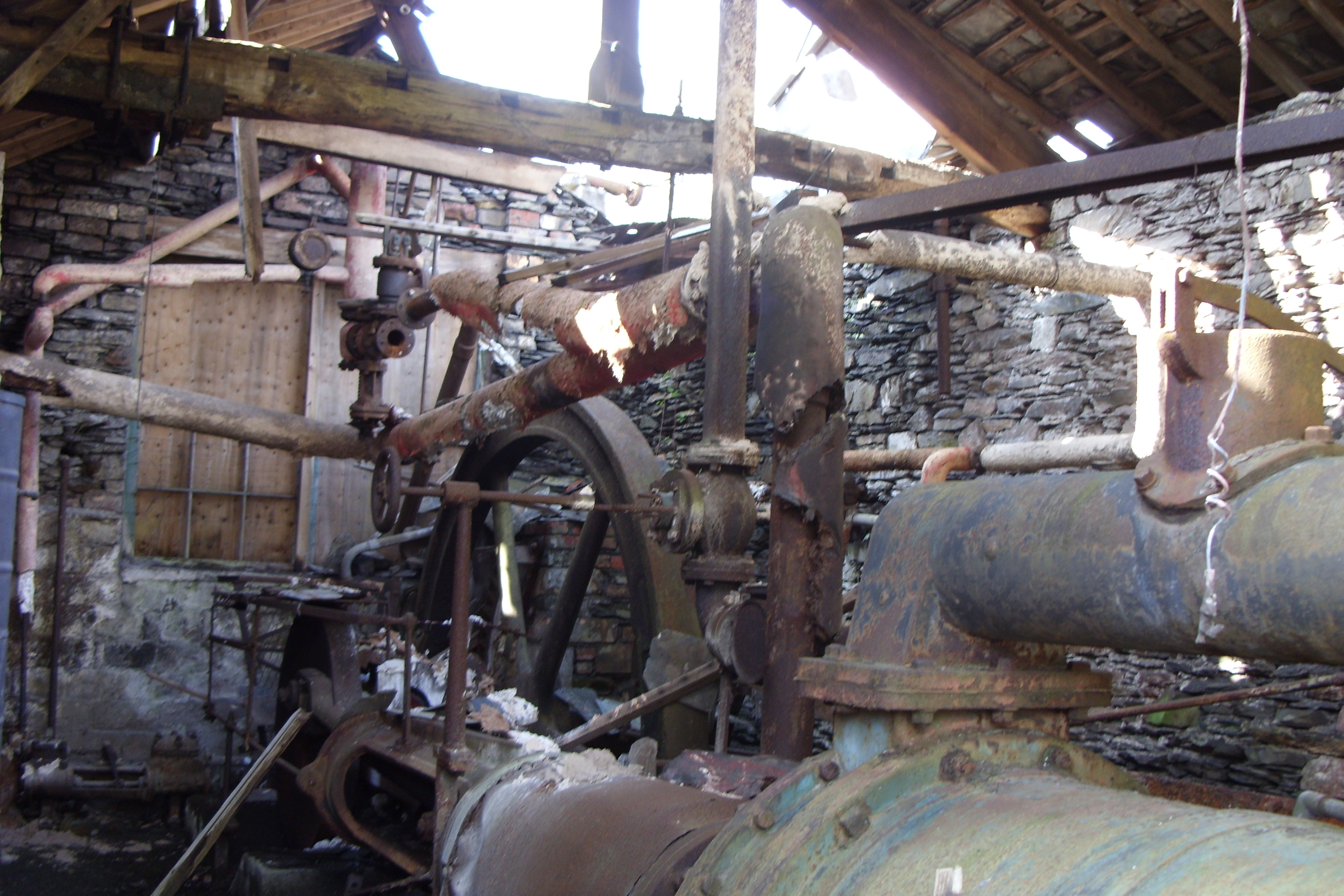
Steam blowing engine at Backbarrow

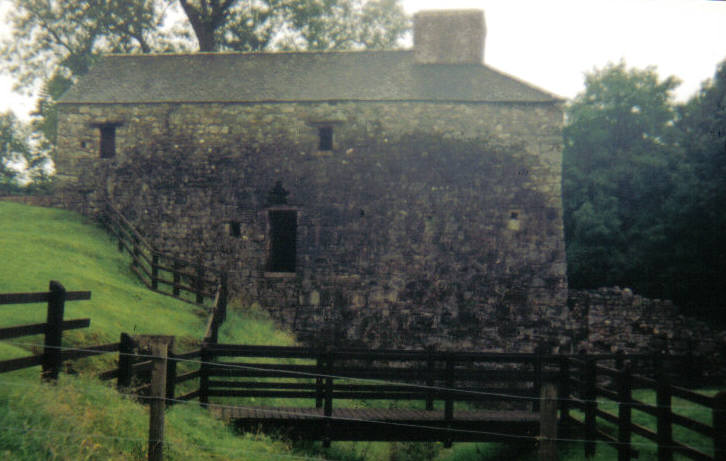
Lorn Furnace

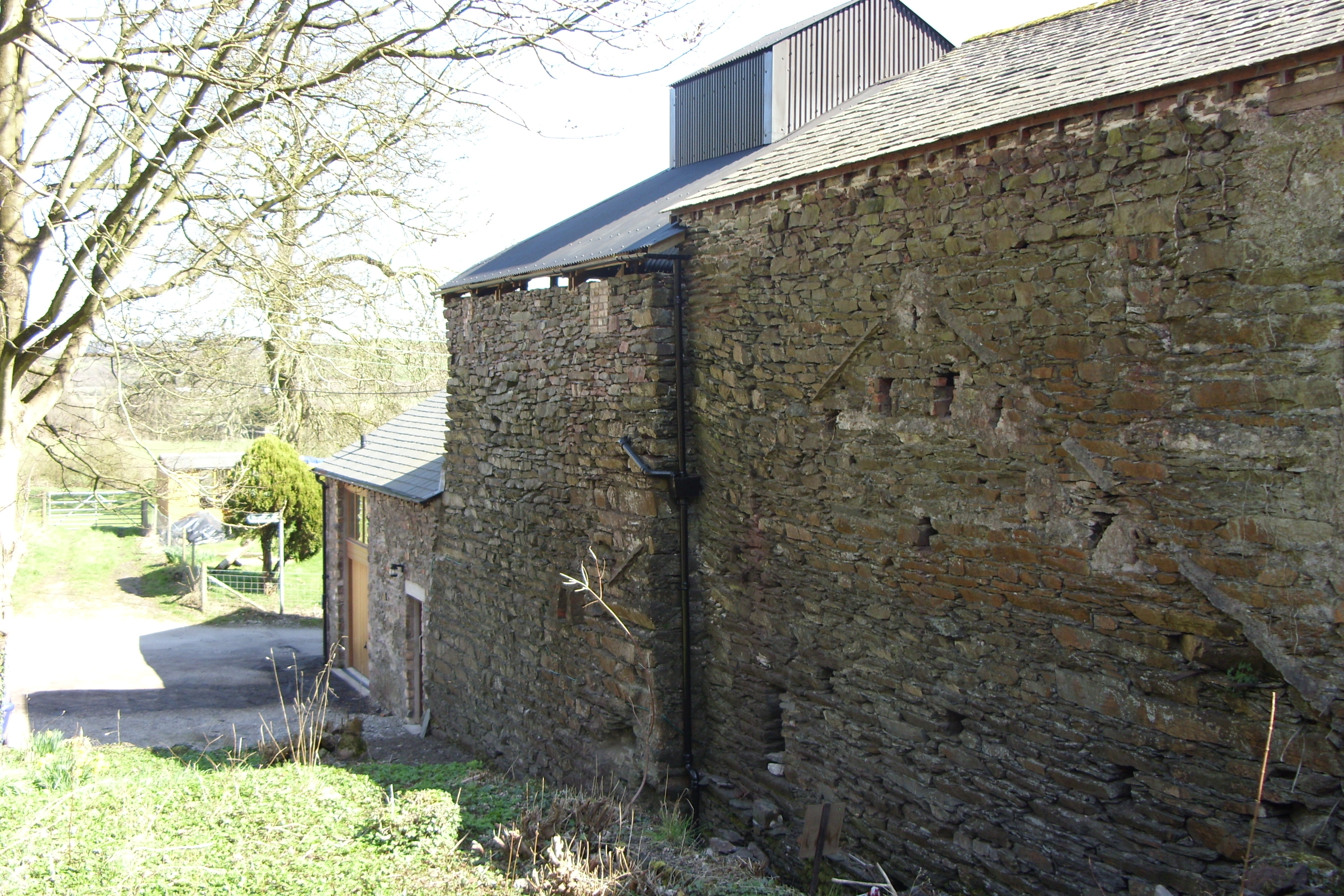
Newland Furnace. The blowing chamber with charging floor above is to the left of the stack. The cement scar is from a roof over the waterwheel.

== Forges ==
Richard Ford was a partner in the Nibthwaite furnace. A finery forge was built here in 1751 and operated by the Newland Company until 1840. The premises were sold in 1850 and a bobbin mill erected on the site.

The Newland Company bought Spark Bridge forge from the Backbarrow Company in 1798. It worked until 1848 and the premises were dismantled and sold in 1853.

A forge was built at Newland in 1783, close to the weir. In 1799 a rolling mill was added, but this was short-lived. The forge closed in 1807.

The corn mill bought by Agnes Bordley in 1747 continued to grind corn, but at some stage a large brick extension was built on top of the stone building. There was some speculation that the corn mill had been moved to the new extension and a forge built on the ground floor. Evidence for this was found in 2008 when the building was converted to a private house. The head of a forge hammer was found built into the wall.

In February 1853, Mr W. Kirk auctioned 150 tons of best charcoal bar iron. The reason given for the sale was that Harrison Ainslie had ceased to produce charcoal bar iron and billets.

== Gunpowder ==
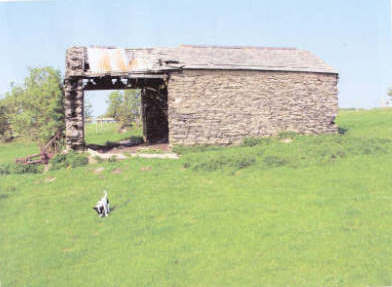
Gunpowder magazine at Poaka, now repaired and converted to stables

The Melfort Gunpowder Co was established in 1853. At the same time as the mills were built, the company sought permission to build powder magazines at Headin Haw, Poaka and Queensferry. Another magazine was built at Dudley. The works included a saltpetre refinery and a cooperage. Three explosions occurred at the works; the second, in 1860 killed six men. The works closed in 1874.

== Electrification ==
The company lit their Lindal Moor mines and also Lindal village and church using Yablochkov candles in 1882.

The second Harrison Ainslie & Co Ltd. built Maskels power station and fitted electric pumps at Lowfield, Grievenson, Bercune, Diamond, and Gillbrow pits.

== See also ==
- Dyfi Furnace
- Charcoal iron
- Furnace, Argyll and Bute
- William George Ainslie
- Taynuilt
