= River Awe =

River in the Southwest Highlands of Scotland

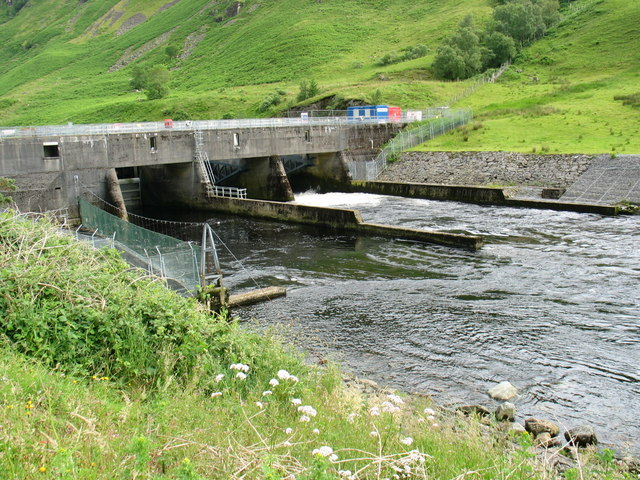
- The River Awe Barrage in the Pass of Brander
- Native name: Uisge Abha (Scottish Gaelic)

Physical characteristics
- Source
  - location: Loch Awe
  - coordinates: 56°24′37″N 05°10′12″W
- Mouth
  - location: Loch Etive
  - coordinates: 56°26′38″N 05°13′35″W

The River Awe (Scottish Gaelic: Uisge Abha) is a short river in Argyll and Bute, Southwest Highlands of Scotland by which the freshwater Loch Awe empties into Loch Etive, a sea loch. The river flows from a barrage which stretches across the end of a deep arm of the loch which protrudes northwestward through the Pass of Brander from the northeast–southwest aligned Loch Awe. The river is accompanied for much of its length both by the railway from Glasgow to Oban and by the A85 road both of which cross the river halfway along its length. The Awe is also crossed by a minor road bridge and a foot bridge.

The river discharges into Loch Etive near to the village of Taynuilt and beside the jetty from which ferries once took traffic using the B845 road across the narrowest part of Loch Etive.
