= List of Celtic festivals =

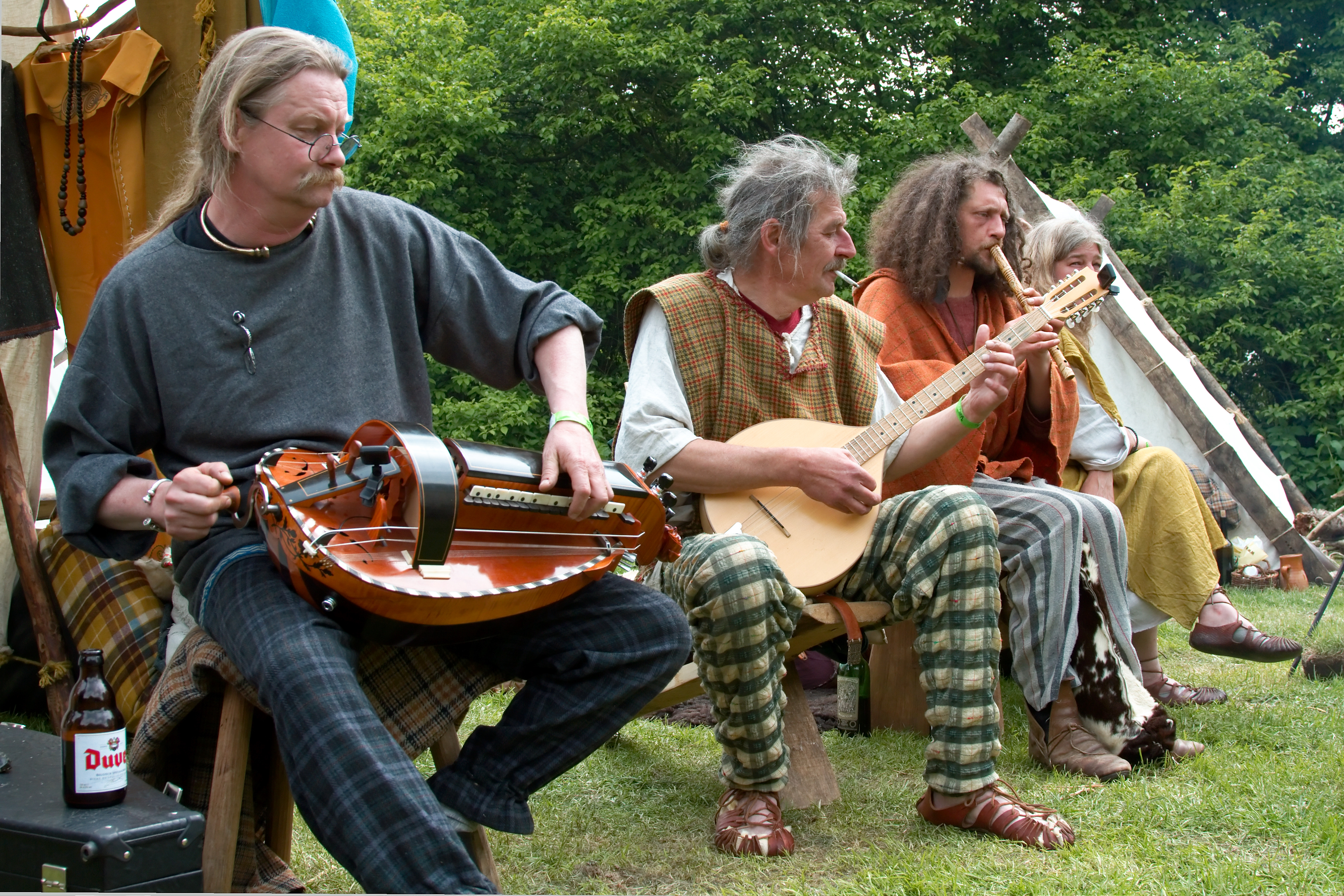
Keltfest in 2010

Celtic festivals celebrate Celtic culture, which in modern times may be via dance, Celtic music, food, Celtic art, or other mediums. Ancient Celtic festivals included religious and seasonal events such as bonfires, harvest festivals, storytelling and music festivals, and dance festivals. This list includes Celtic festivals held throughout the world.

== History ==
There are several specific and often ancient types of Celtic festivals. A fèis (plural fèiseannan) is a traditional Gaelic arts and culture festival, currently used referring to Irish dance competitions. In Ancient Ireland communities placed great importance on local festivals, where Gaels could come together in song, dance, music, theatre and sport. Today the Fèis has experienced something of a rebirth, both for ethnic Gaels and for enthusiasts of the Gaelic culture in Ireland and Scotland, and worldwide. Other ancient festivals include the eisteddfod, which is a Welsh festival of literature, music and performance dating back to at least the 12th century. The present-day format owes much to an eighteenth-century revival arising out of a number of informal eisteddfodau. Comparable to the eisteddfod but without the ancient roots, the Mòd is a festival of Scottish Gaelic song, arts and culture. There are both local mods and an annual national Mòd, the Royal National Mòd, which take the form of formal competitions, with choral events and traditional music including fiddle, bagpipe and folk groups. There are spoken word events, original dramas, and competitions in written literature.

The concept of modern Celtic identity evolved during the course of the 19th-century into the Celtic Revival and the growth of Celtic nations. After World War II, the focus of the Celticity movement shifted to linguistic revival and protectionism, e.g. protecting Celtic languages. The Celtic revival also led to the emergence of musical and artistic styles identified as Celtic. Music typically drew on folk traditions within the Celtic nations, and instruments such as Celtic harp. Art drew on decorative styles associated with the ancient Celts and with early medieval Celtic Christianity, along with folk-styles. Cultural events to promote "inter-Celtic" cultural exchange also emerged, including festivals.

== Celtic festivals by country ==
=== Oceania ===
==== Australia ====
- Kernewek Lowender in Moonta, South Australia
- National Celtic Festival in Portarlington, Victoria

=== Europe ===
==== France ====
- Brandivy (section Breizh–Kernow Festival) (Brittany)
- Festival Celtique, in Plessé
- Festival de Cornouaille (Quimper)
- Festival Interceltique de Lorient (Lorient)
- Festiv'Arz, in Arzal
- Kan ar Bobl (Pontivy)

==== Ireland ====
- Saint Brigid's Day, Imbolc (Killorglin, Ireland)
- Fleadh Cheoil (Tullamore, Ireland)
- Oireachtas na Gaeilge
- Pan Celtic Festival
- Puck Fair (Killorglin, Ireland)
- Seachtain na Gaeilge
- Willie Clancy Summer School (Milltown Malbay, Ireland)

Italy

- Insubria Festival, Marcallo con Casone, Lombardia

==== Spain ====
- Interceltic Festival of Avilés or "Festival Intercéltico de Avilés" (Avilés, Asturies, Spain)
- Ortigueira's Festival of Celtic World, Galicia
- Festival Internacional do Mundo Celta de Ortigueira (Ortigueira, Galicia, Spain)

==== United Kingdom ====
===== Scotland =====
- Celtic Connections, Glasgow
- Fèis Bharraigh, Barra Fest, Isle of Barra
- Royal National Mòd, Am Mòd Nàiseanta Rìoghail (Glasgow, Scotland)
- Hebridean Celtic Festival (Stornoway, Scotland)

===== Wales =====
- National Eisteddfod of Wales, Eisteddfod Genedlaethol Cymru
- Urdd National Eisteddfod, Eisteddfod Yr Urdd
- Llangollen International Music Eisteddfod, Eisteddfod Llangollen
- Tafwyl (Cardiff, Wales)
- Sesiwn Fawr Dolgellau (Dolgellau, Wales)
- Cerdd Dant Festival, Gŵyl Cerdd Dant

===== Northern Ireland =====
- Soma Festival (Castlewellan, Northern Ireland)

===== Cornwall =====
- AberFest, held in Falmouth (Aberfal) (alternating with Breizh-Kernow Festival in Brittany)
- Perranzabuloe, Lowender Peran, held at Perranporth, Cornwall, in honour of St Piran

Isle of Man

- Yn Chruinnaght (Isle of Man)

=== North America ===
==== Canada ====
- Celtic Colours, Cape Breton Island. Nova Scotia
- Goderich Celtic Roots Festival
- Russell CelticFest

== Gallery ==
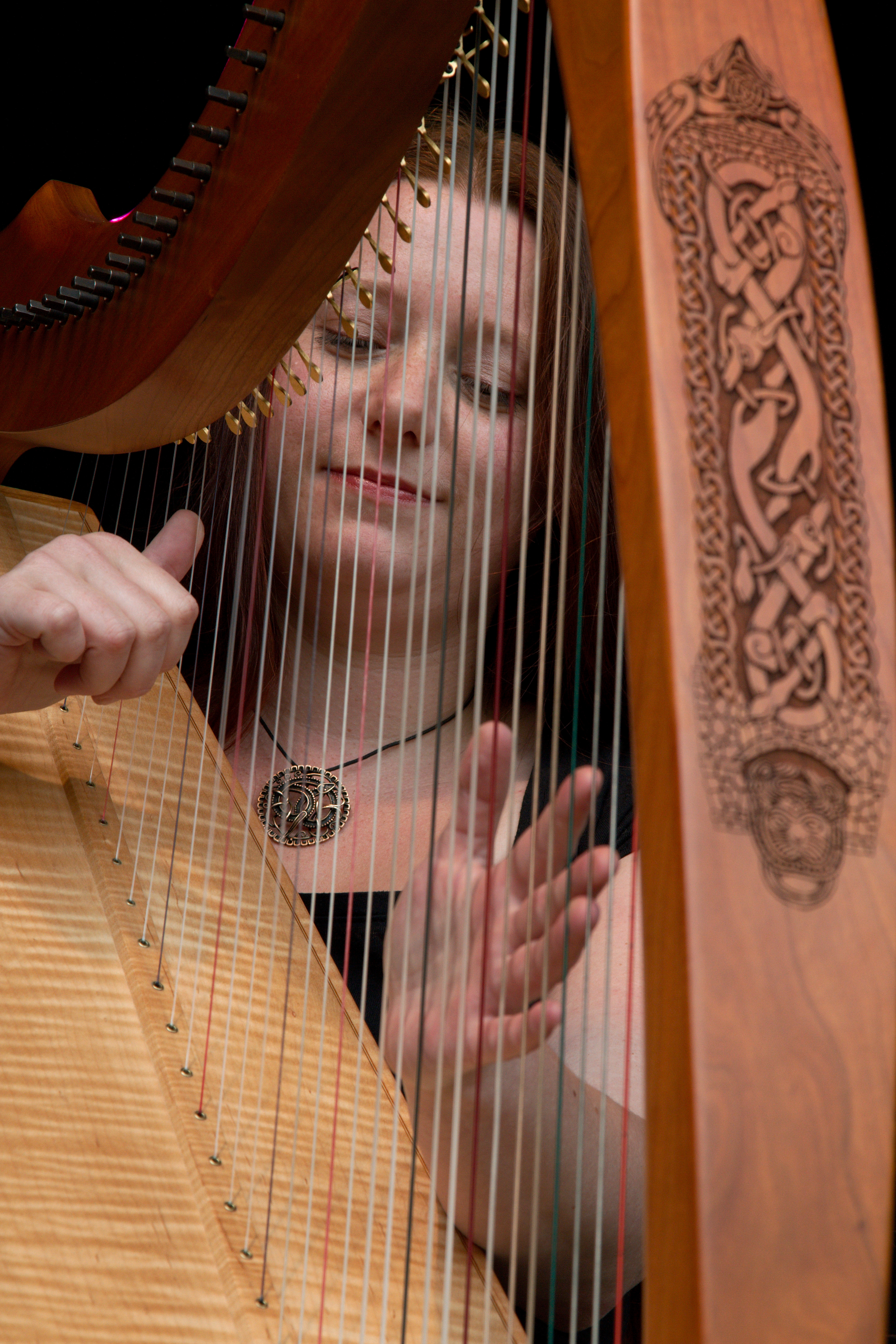

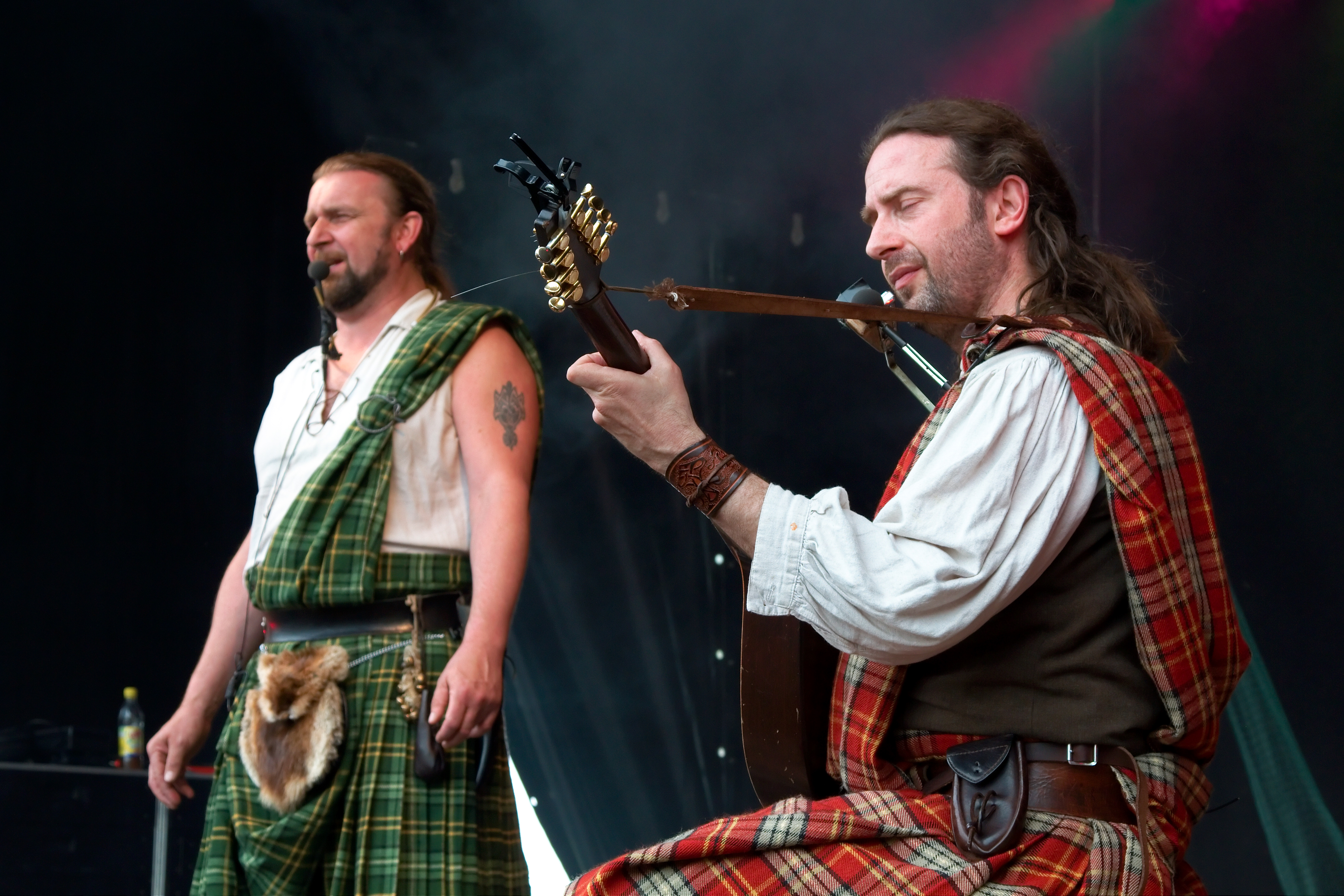

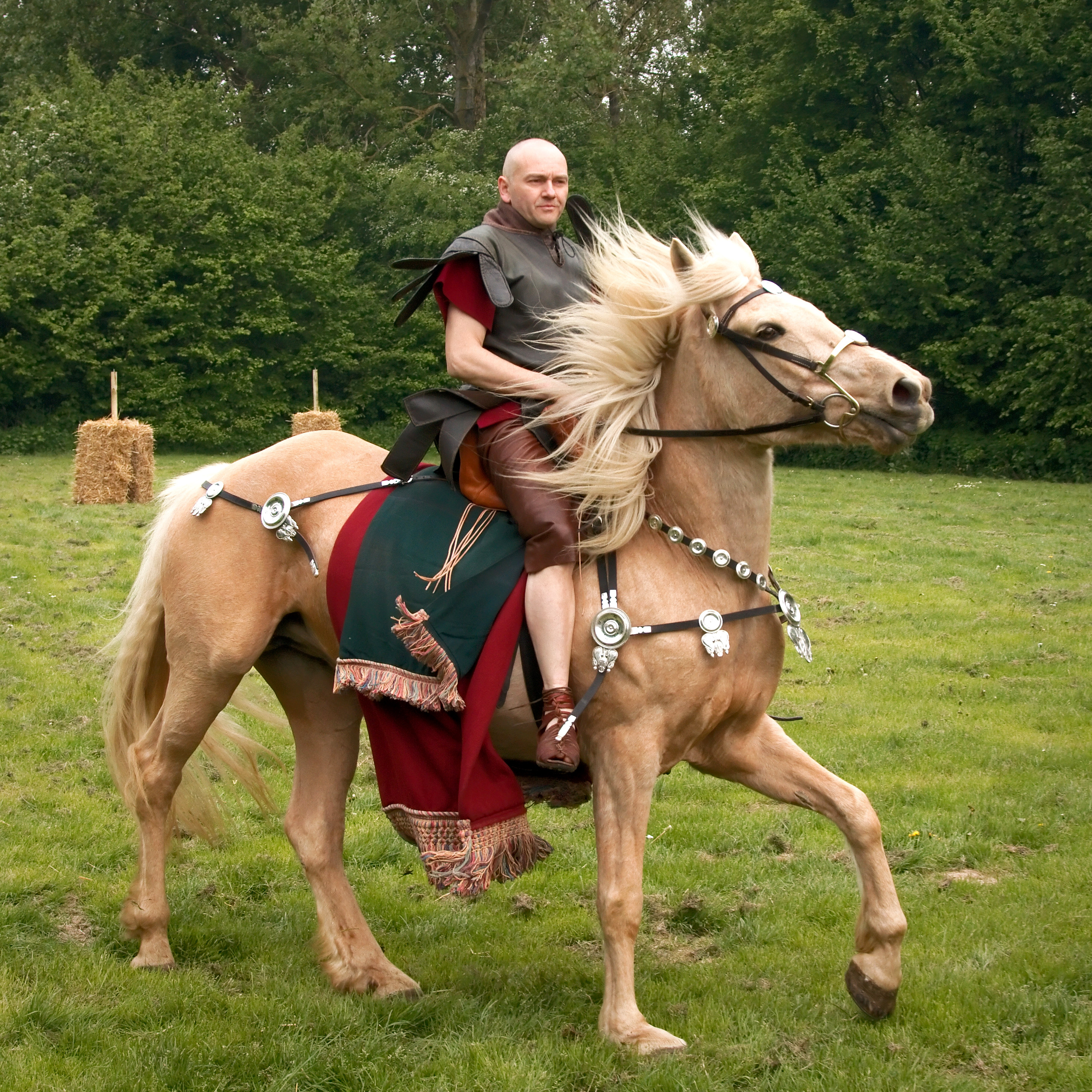

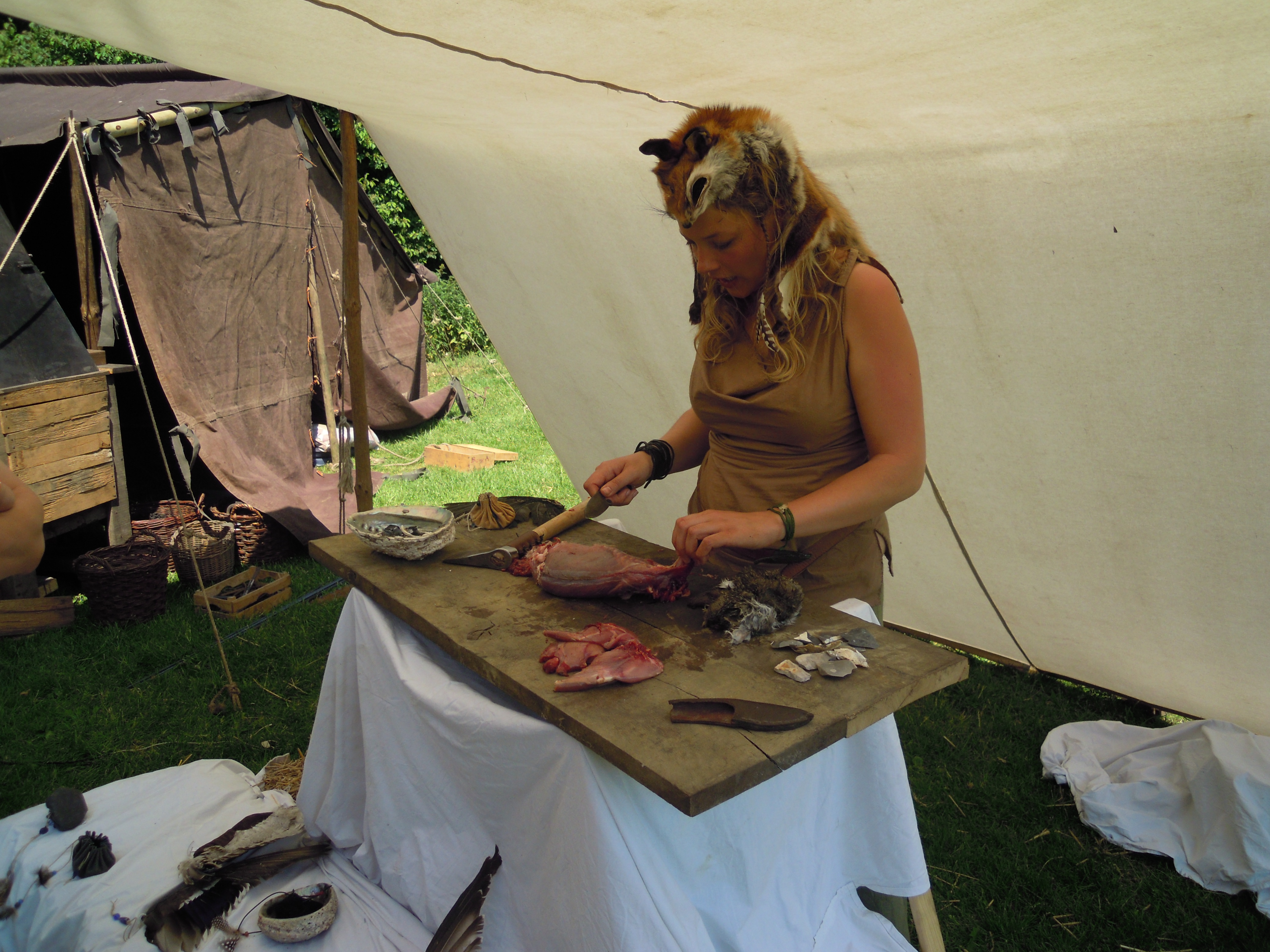

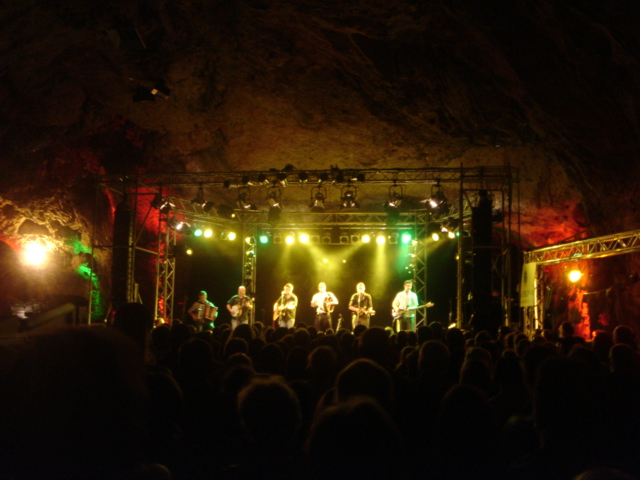
Weissmann Irish 2008

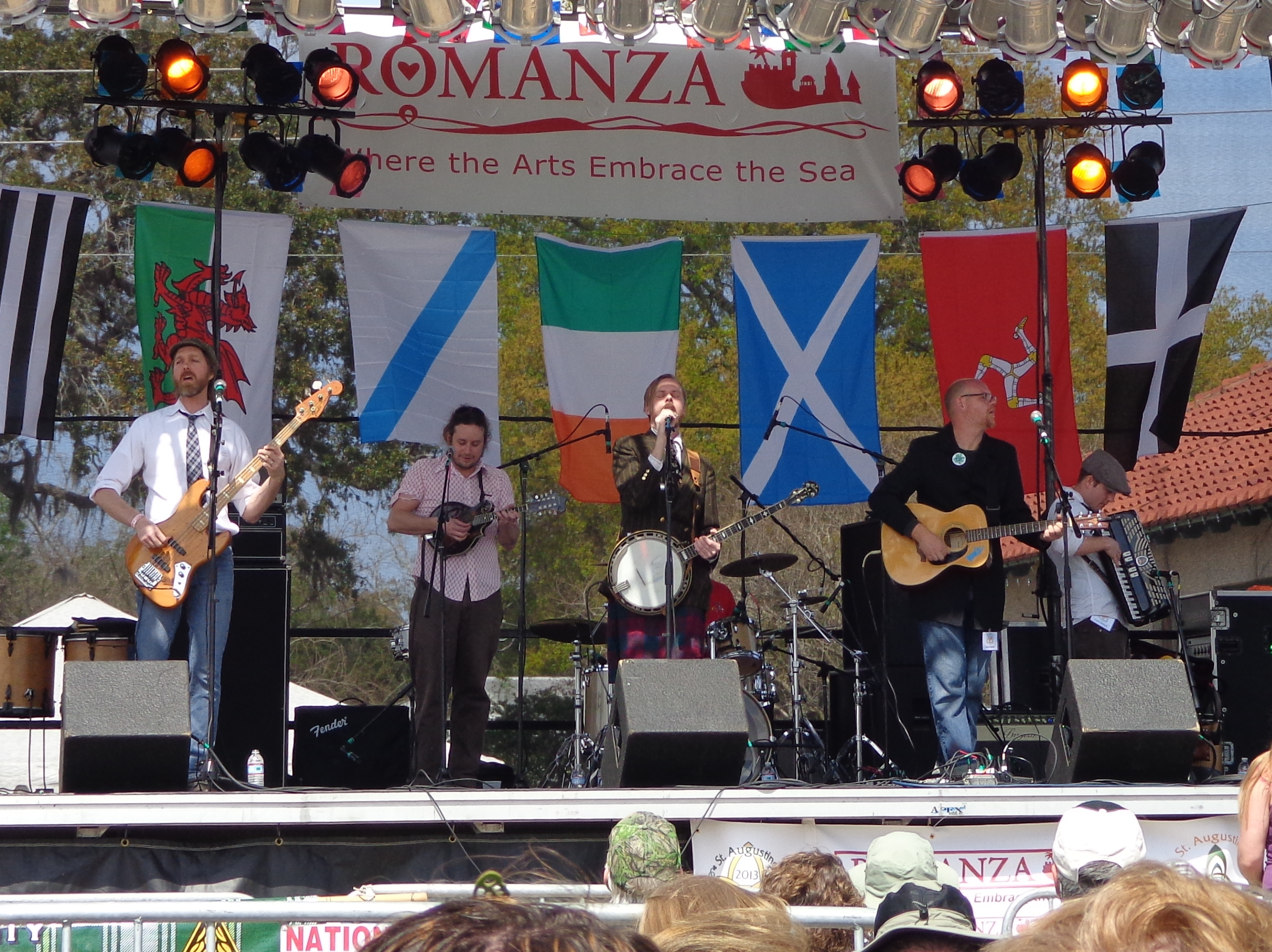
St. Augustine Celtic Music & Heritage Festival

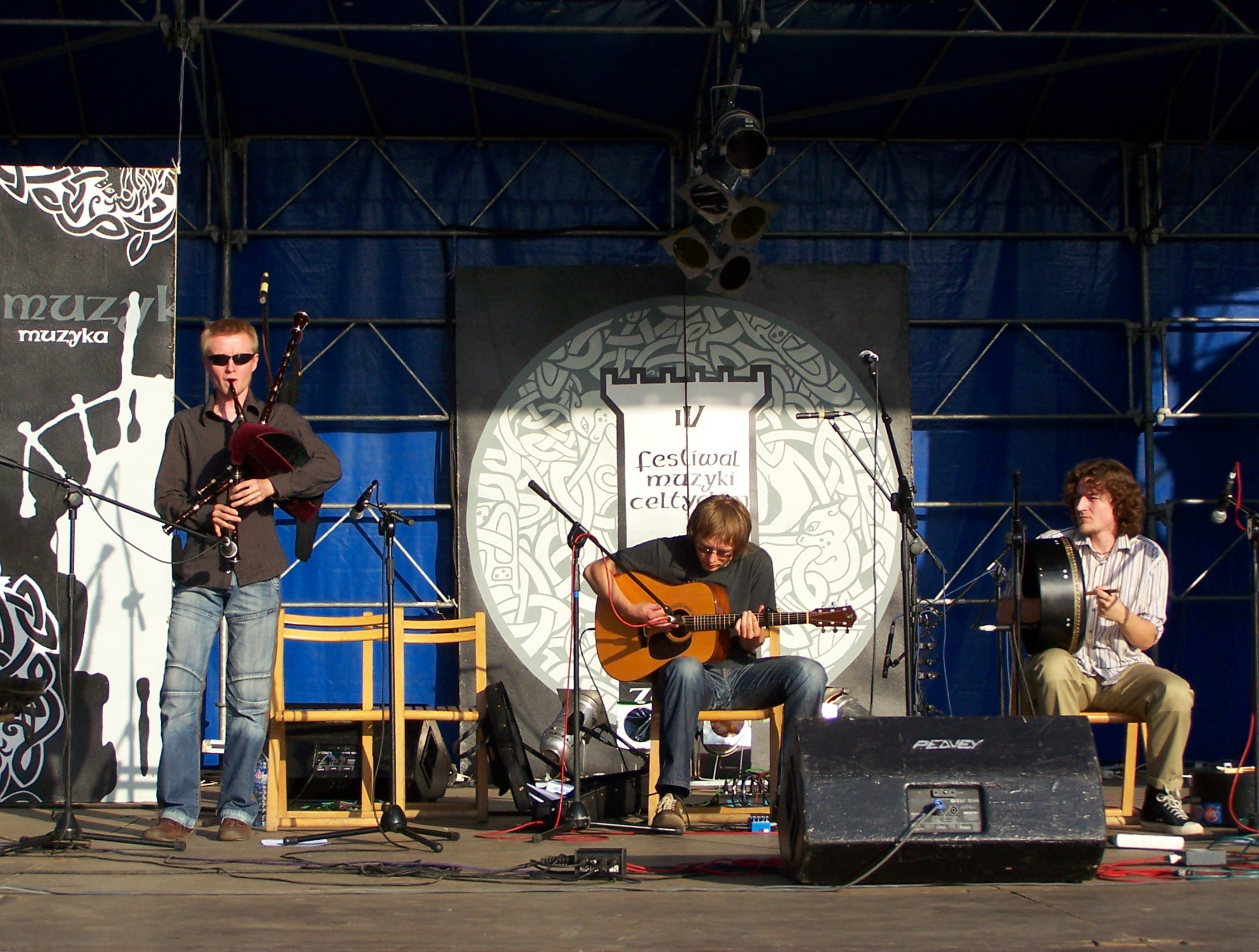

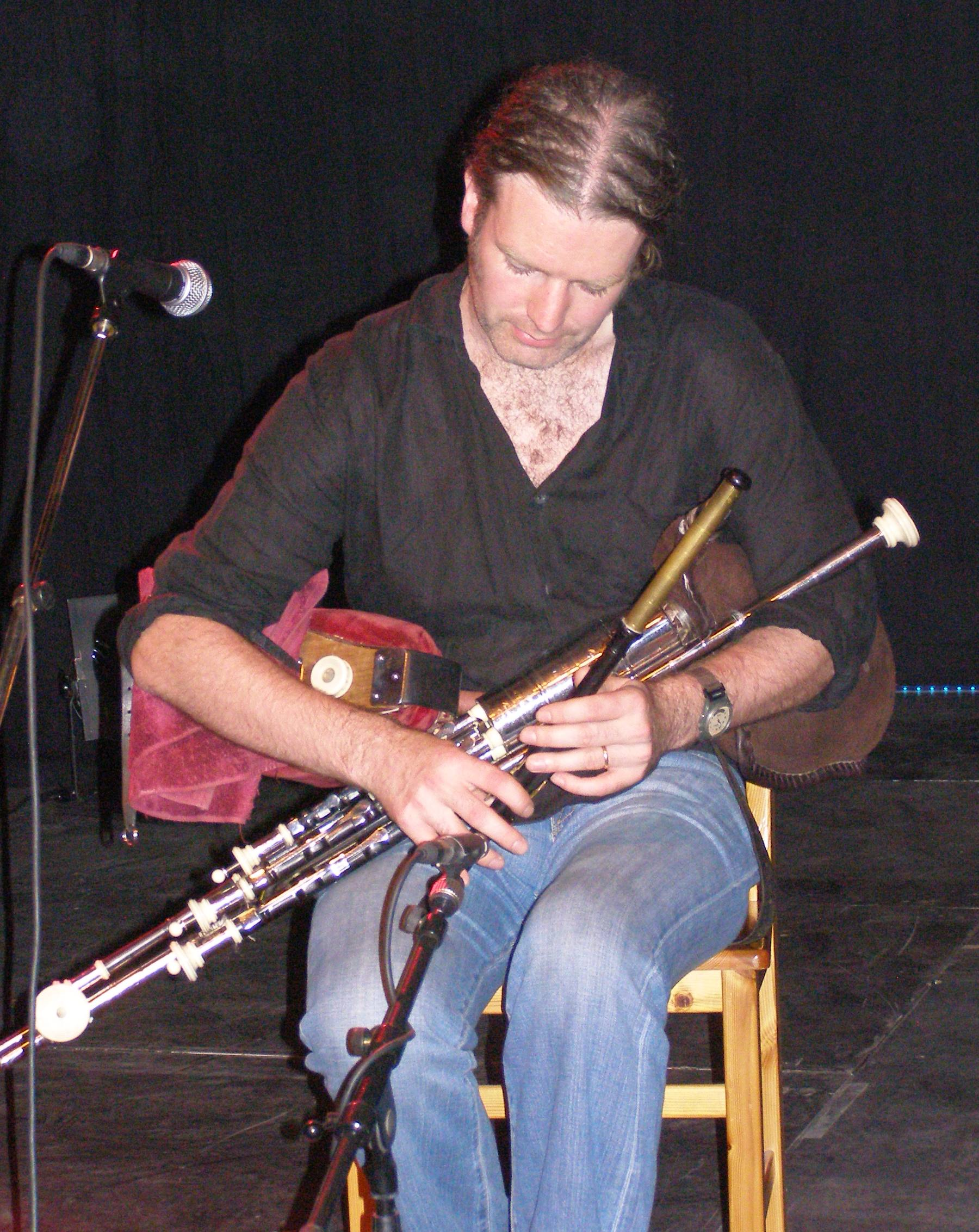

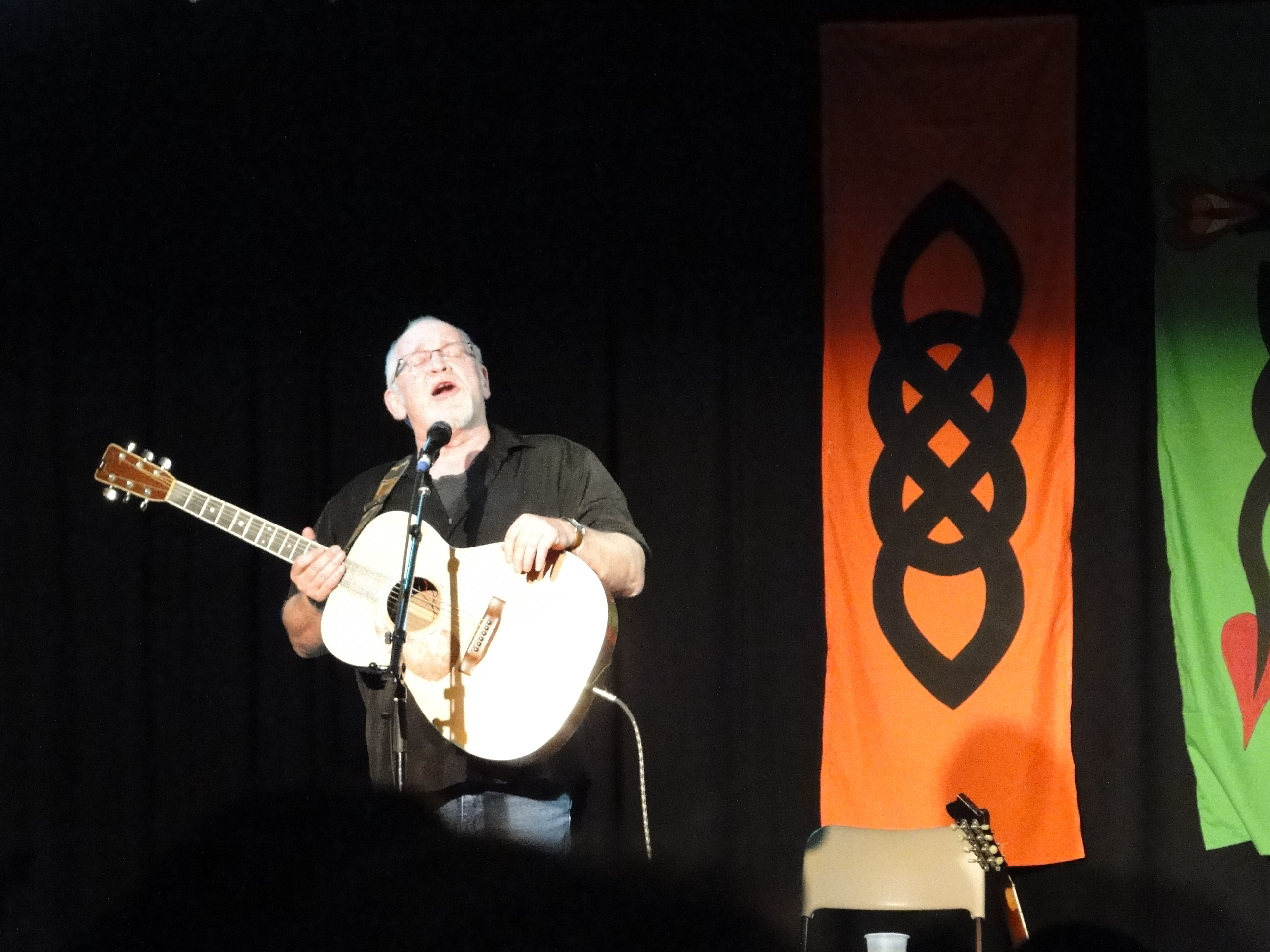

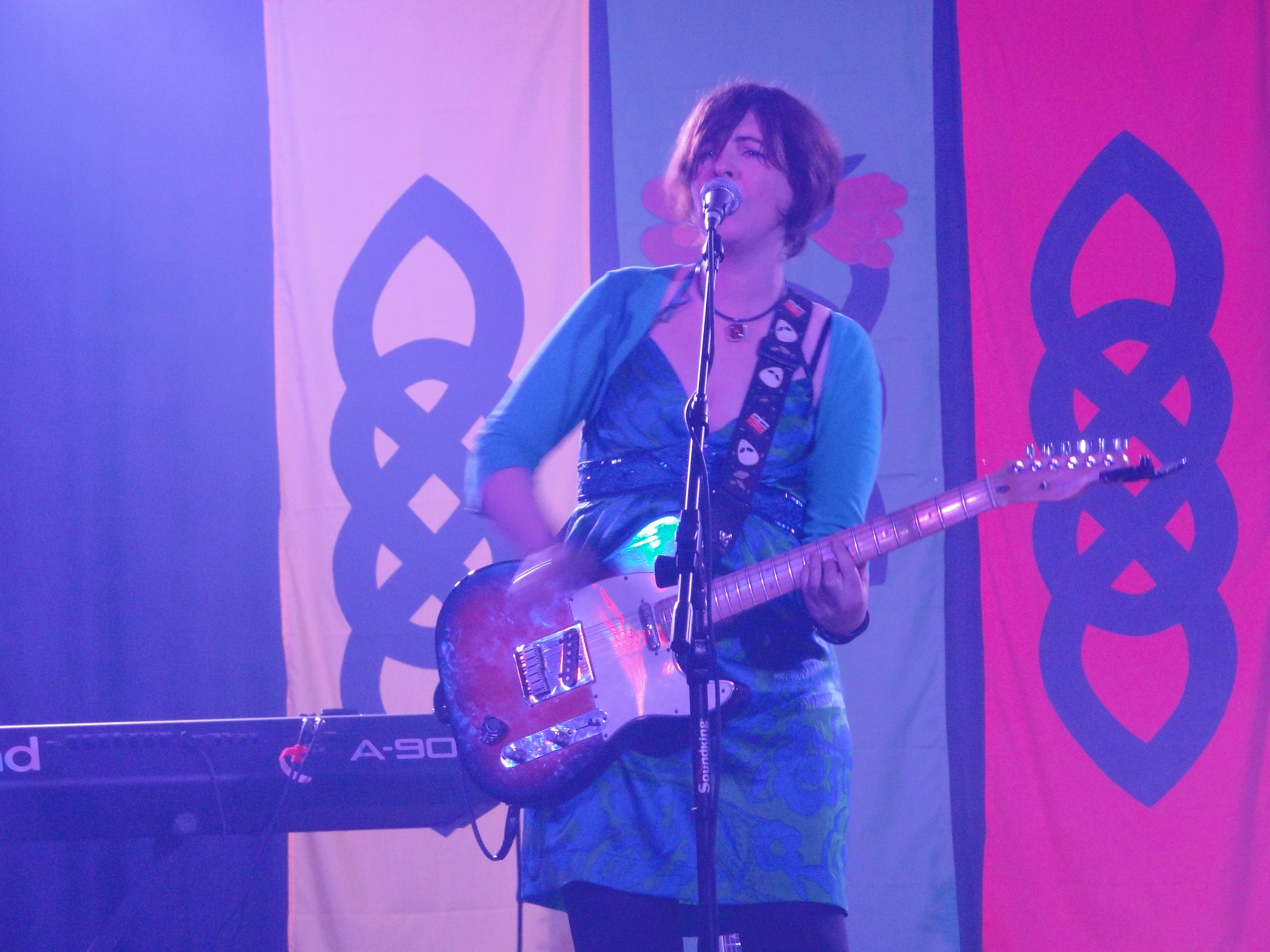

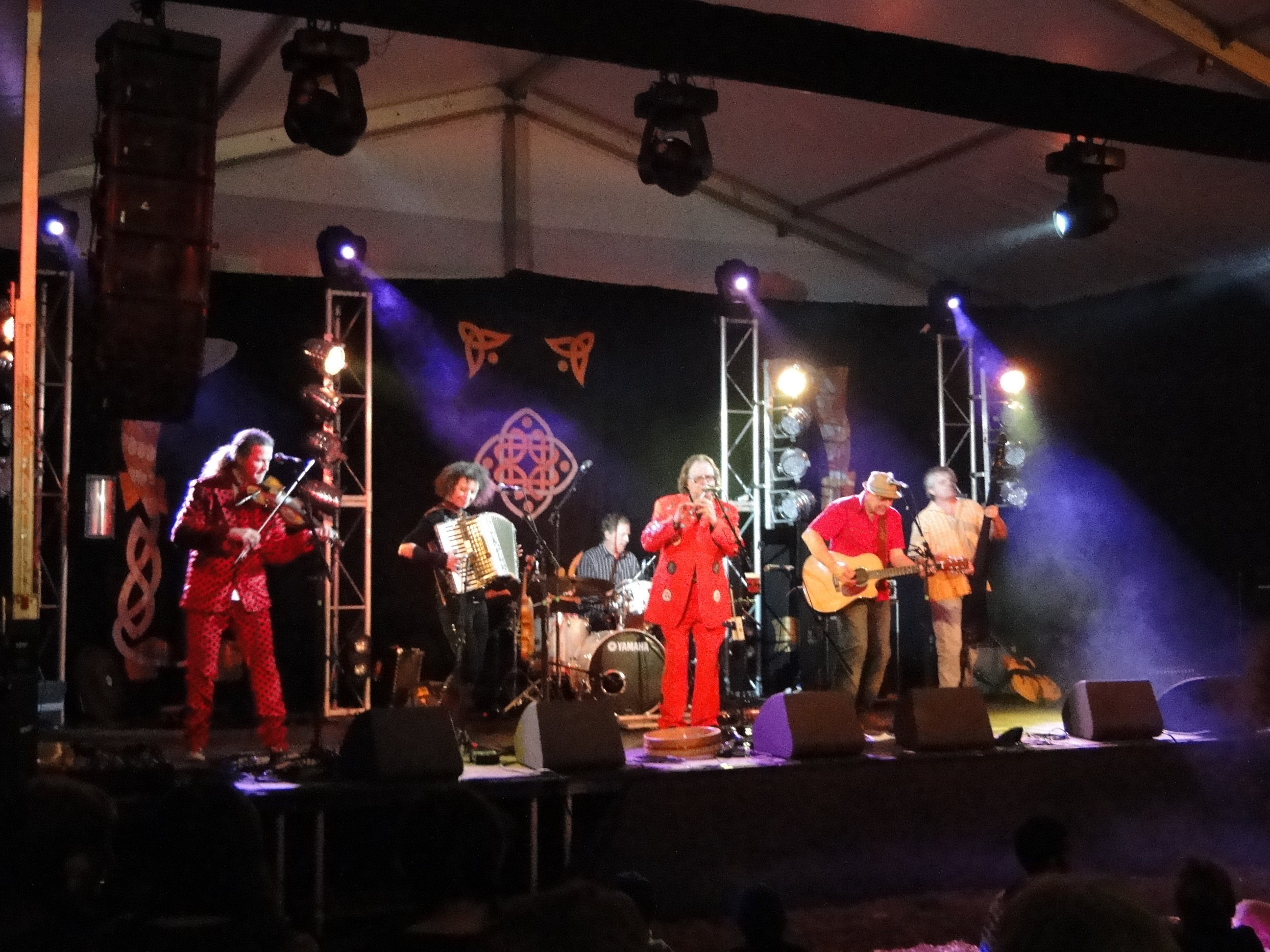

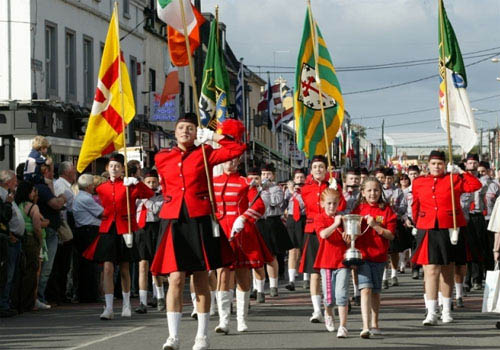
