= Naver Athletic Camanachd Club =

Naver Athletic
- Full name: Naver Athletic Camanachd Club
- Gaelic name: Comann Camanachd Nabhair
- Nickname: The Cattachs
- Founded: 2008
- Ground: Shinty Pitch, Bettyhill
- 2009: Defunct
| Home | Away |

Naver Athletic Camanachd Club was a shinty club based in Bettyhill, Sutherland, Scotland established in 2008. It was a select team drawing players from both Sutherland and Caithness. Naver competed in the Strathdearn and Sutherland Cups in 2008.

== History ==
The club was founded after three years of youth development in the region and the success of the Far North League in 2007, contested between Kinlochbervie (Black & Red Strips), Farr/Bettyhill (Maroon) and Thurso (Dark Blue). The League welcomed Wick in 2008, bringing the league up to 4 teams competing.

Shinty was traditionally strong in the area up until the 20th century, and the Farr side have been instrumental in resurrecting the New Year Shinty tradition in North Sutherland.

The club's first senior fixture was against Lochside Rovers in the Sutherland Cup. Lochside won this game 18–0. The club then suffered the same scoreline in their Strathdearn Cup match, losing 18–0 to Boleskine. The club did not enter cup competition in 2009 or 2010 and may be assumed to be defunct. Kinlochbervie and Farr both continue to play at junior level and may rise to senior level in future.

The success of the Mod Cup at the Caithness Mod in 2010, where Caithness defeated Sutherland 3-1 has sparked hopes that Naver will be resurrected. A instrumental founder of the Naver side, Kenny "Nostie" Macleod, who was also a minister in the Free Church of Scotland, died in April 2012.

Farr Camanachd continue to play but there is no impetus to develop the club into a senior side. However, there was a replay of the Caithness V Sutherland match in 2012 in memorial of Kenny "Nostie".

Naver can now be considered totally defunct. However, Caithness Shinty Club and Kinlochbervie Camanachd continue to fly the flag for the Far North of Scotland.

== Knotty ==
A shinty-like game known as Knotty was resurrected in Lybster in the 2000s, where the World Championships are held each year.
