= Lochbroom =

Loch Broom or Lochbroom may refer to:

- Loch Broom, Nova Scotia
- Loch Broom, a sea loch located in Ross and Cromarty, Scotland
- Lochbroom, Highland, a civil parish in Scotland
- Lochbroom Camanachd, a Scottish shinty club
- SS Lochbroom, a British coaster
