= Uist Camanachd =

Uist
- Full name: Uist Camanachd Club
- Gaelic name: Comann Camanachd Uibhist
- Nickname: Na Uibhistich
- Founded: 1990s
- Ground: Machair Lionacleit, Benbecula.
- Manager: Keith Macdonald
- League: Non-League
Home

Uist Camanachd is a shinty team from the Western Isles, Scotland. The club is based in North Uist but draws its players from the whole archipelago from Berneray to Eriskay.

== Roots of shinty in Uist ==
Shinty died out in the Uists in the 1900s due to a difficulty in gaining access to the Camanachd Association's competitions and the rise of football after the First World War. The sport was once highly organised within the islands itself, with Tigharry being the final champions of Uist in 1907. Due to a lack of trees, camans were made with sea weed stalks at the time.

Shinty returned to Uist on a permanent basis in the 1990s and the initiatives spearheaded at this time have resulted in a vibrant youth system alongside a senior team which claimed its first senior trophy by winning the Mod Cup in 2005 against Lewis Camanachd. The club is also involved in coaching shinty at local Feisean.

== Modern era ==
In 2008 the senior side lost 4–6 to Lewis on aggregate in the HebCelt Trophy. Uist won the trophy for the first time in 2009, defeating Lewis 3–0.

At youth level, Uist has been making advances in recent years, with U-14 teams competing at National Development level, 2008 saw the team's best ever performance, finishing third. They also competed in the Minch Medal Tournament.

In 2009, the youth teams will be competed in mainland competition on a full-time basis for the first time, playing against Skye B and Lochcarron. In August 2009, Uist hosted Skye but were defeated 12–0.

In 2010, Uist lost the Hebridean Celtic Festival Cup match to Lewis Camanachd 4–1. In 2010, the club was visited by Ronald Ross.

In 2011, the club entered the Camanachd Association Development League, a new tier of shinty for developing clubs such as Uist. They played their first ever games as a senior side on the mainland against Strathspey Camanachd and Kinlochbervie Camanachd on 21 May 2011 at Beauly. The club lost in the HebCelt Cup match 3–2 to Lewis. The club competed for the Mod Cup in October 2011 but were defeated by Lewis Camanachd 2–0 on home soil.

In 2012, a sixes team competing as Uist came second in a six a-side tournament in Edinburgh. Uist won the Hebcelt Cup on penalties in 2012.

Shinty in Uist over the last few years has been overtaken by developments in Lewis, but the club has exported players to the mainland and in 2018 won the HebCelt Cup for the first time since 2018.

The club won the HebCelt Cup again in 2022.

== Honours ==
- 2005 Lord of the Isles
- 2005 Mod Cup
- 2009, 2012, 2018, 2022 HebCelt Cup

== North Uist Shinty Challenge Cup ==
On 3 November 2007, the club regained possession of the North Uist Shinty Challenge Cup, which had been in the possession of D.R. Macdonald for many years. The club is resurrected the tradition of New Year shinty in North Uist with a game between the Westside (An Taobh Siar) and the Eastside (An Taobh Sear) of the Island on Hogmanay 2007 to mark a hundred years since the trophy was last played for. The game took place at Paible School and the Eastside triumphed 9–0.

The trophy was contested again in 2008 with the Westside winning 8–1. In 2009, the Eastside won 7–5. In 2010, the match was won by the Eastside again but in a tight 6-3 contest. The fixture is also complemented by the Lachlan McQuien Memorial Shield, an under-14 match between East and West dedicated to Lachlan McQuien, who was the last surviving player from the 1907 game and whose great-grandchildren are involved in the club today.

The fixture was not held in 2011 as the club were refused permission to use the usual venue on the scheduled date.

North Uist Shinty Challenge Cup Winners

- 2007 An Taobh Sear
- 2008 An Taobh Siar
- 2009 An Taobh Sear
- 2010 An Taobh Sear
- 2011 Not held
