= Lewis Camanachd =

Lewis
- Full name: Lewis Camanachd
- Gaelic name: Comann Camanachd Leòdhais
- Nickname: Na Leòdhasaich
- Founded: 2006
- Ground: Sgoil Shiaboist
- Manager: John MacAskill
- League: North Division Two
- 2025: 3rd
Home	Away

Lewis Camanachd (Scottish Gaelic: Comann Camanachd Leòdhais is the senior shinty team from the Isle of Lewis, Scotland. The club entered North Division Three for the first time in 2011. This was the first time a team from the Western Isles was allowed to compete in league shinty. However, the club was only allowed in on trial and awaited a decision from the Camanachd Association as to whether this was to become a permanent arrangement. Lewis was granted entry on a permanent basis from 2012.

== Early history ==
Although the Western Isles are one of the last bastions of Scottish Gaelic, shinty was not particularly common in recent times due to a steady decline in play from the beginning of the 20th century onwards and due to the growth in popularity of football. Shinty was played at community level until at least the 1930s.

Shinty in Lewis was re-introduced in 1995 by local enthusiasts. Clubs were set up in Back, Sandwick and Tong. However, eventually Back Camanachd was the only club left playing. Back competed for the Mod Cup against Kyleakin in 2001.

In the first senior game played by a whole Lewis team, a Lewis select lost to Uist Camanachd in the 2005 Mod Cup Final.

== Reconstitution ==
The club was reconstituted in 2006 and entered cup competitions in 2007, the first club from the Outer Hebrides to do so. In its first competitive fixtures, the club was drawn against Glasgow Mid Argyll in the Sutherland Cup and Fort William in the Strathdearn Cup. The club did not progress beyond those fixtures.

The club established training facilities at the Stornoway Primary School in Stornoway; but as there was no pitch in Stornoway of adequate standard for shinty, competitive "home" games were played on Lochbroom Camanachd's ground in Ullapool, a three-hour ferry ride away on the mainland. In September 2009, the Scots Shinty Club was the first mainland shinty team to travel to Lewis for a game against Lewis Camanachd at senior level.

The club has two annual fixtures that it arranges or is involved in: the Cuach a' Chuain Sgith trophy against Lochbroom and the Hebcelt Trophy, which is played for at the time of the Hebridean Celtic Festival.

In 2008, the club had three players selected to represent Alba at shinty/hurling.

In 2009, the club suffered a record defeat to Fort William in the Strathdearn Cup, losing 20–1. The game did have one positive note for Lewis: it included the club's first goal in competitive shinty, scored by Alasdair Mackenzie.

In 2010, the club failed to progress in either of the competitions it entered, losing to both Inveraray and Skye. However, the club did win the Far North Six a-Side Competition Lewis Camanachd Win North Coast Shinty Sixes. and the Hebridean Celtic Festival Cup.

== Application to enter the league ==
In late 2010, Lewis applied to join the national leagues for the 2011 season. The Camanachd Association said that it would decide about admitting the club at their board meeting on 2 February 2011. The club mounted a spirited campaign to make clear its case for entry, ensuring that concerns regarding the logistics of clubs travelling from the mainland were met.

On Thursday 3 February, it was announced that Lewis had been granted permission to enter North Division Three on an initial one-year trial basis.

On 26 March 2011, Lewis claimed their first points in competitive shinty with a draw away to Strathglass. On 14 May 2011 the club played their first home game: they were defeated by Lochbroom. However, on 11 June 2011 Lewis secured their first ever competitive victory, by 3–1 against Ardnamurchan, at Shawbost. The club also defeated Hebridean neighbours Uist Camanachd in the HebCelt Cup. They also defeated the Uist club in the Mod Cup, the first time the club (or any team from Lewis) had won this trophy.

The club finished bottom of the league in their debut season, but completed all their fixtures and gained three points, a total which compared well with that of other teams in their debut seasons. They received the Marine Harvest National Fairplay Award in October 2011. They then awaited the Camanachd Association's decision on league membership which was given on 7 December 2011 after a lengthy consultation. The result was positive and Lewis were granted permanent membership of the league.

== Permanent league members (2012 onwards) ==
The club hosted pre-season friendlies against Skye and Newtonmore before beginning their second league season. By 19 April 2012 they had exceeded their 2011 points total, with their first away win at the Bught Park against Inverness and a 6–6 draw against Strathspey Camanachd. Lewis finished the season in eighth place, a two place and five point improvement on their debut season. Paul Duke stepped down at the end of the season and was replaced by Iain Sinclair for the 2013 season. Sinclair's first term in charge saw Lewis avoid bottom spot again for the second year in succession.

In 2014, Lewis rose from 9th the previous season to finish 2nd, having secured top three shinty earlier on in the season. They were promoted to North Division Two, partly due to league reconstruction, where Lewis finished 8th out of ten teams. Iain Sinclair stepped down to be replaced by Duncan MacIntyre.

The Heb Celt Cup was won in July 2016 with a resounding 6–0 victory over Uist Camanachd. Donald Lamont scored four times and Scott MacLeod twice.

The club has continued to fulfil all its fixtures, including the only game played in the curtailed 2020 season. They played a range of matches in late 2021 as they emerged from Covid.

In 2022 the club had a successful season. They won their first ever cup game, against Boleskine and won several other games, finishing 4th in the league. They did however, lose the HebCelt Cup to Uist.
