= Cornwall Shinty Club =

Shinty club from Cornwall, England

Cornwall
- Full name: Cornwall Shinty Club
- Nickname: The Pasties
- Founded: 2012
- Ground: The Dracaena Centre, Falmouth
- Manager: Matt Mossop
- League: SW Shinty League
Home

The Cornwall Shinty Club is a shinty club from Cornwall in the UK. Formed in 2012, it is one of few clubs outside the Scottish Highlands.

== History ==
Shinty-like stick games were played in Cornwall as well as across much of England before the end of the 19th century. A number of Cornish newspaper references show that the game was popular into the early 20th Century, with shinty relays included in a number of school sports days, matches recorded and Scottish shinty developments also recorded.

In 1919 The Cornishman newspaper's West Cornwall News section related: 'Scotland is enthusiastic over the revival of shinty. The championship competition is to start this year, and entries are to be received up to 1 November. Kingussie Club was the last winner of the cup. International contests may be arranged. Lord Lovat is re-elected chief' (CM24/9/1919 p. 5). In Cornwall, locals played a form of shinty in the streets of Penryn with lumps of coal in the 1960s. The more standard form continued to be played regularly right up until the 1980s in Cornwall, though latterly at fewer venues. It was played intermittently in Cornwall in the mid-1990s, though predominantly by small groups of visitors more accustomed to playing in Scotland.

London Camanachd lead the resurgence from the 1980s onwards, though Cornwall and then wider England, fielding sides in the St Andrews Sixes, though both teams were predominantly made up of ex-university and armed forces players.

== Current club ==
The current club was formed in The Thirsty Scholar in Penryn on 15 March 2012, with the Committee made up of a group of archaeologists and archaeological students, chaired by Matt Mossop, a former St Andrews University and Scottish Universities player.

Cornwall had their first match against London Camanachd in April 2012 at the community green in Flax Bourton. This was the first Shinty Shop Challenge Cup. The match ended 1–1. Cornwall competed at the St. Andrew's Sixes in 2012 losing out to the eventual winners Glasgow Island.

In September 2012 they took part in the London Shinty Festival. The first AGM in December 2012 saw the establishment of Mabe and The Combined Universities of Cornwall Shinty Clubs in Cornwall. These two clubs currently form the pool of players available for selection for Cornwall. Cornwall Shinty Club applied for affiliate club membership of the Camanachd Association in January 2013 and again participated in The Shinty-Shop Challenge Cup 2013. Six of the Cornish Ladies squad participated in the inaugural English Ladies team against St Andrews Ladies in the London Festival of Shinty.

The Club was asked to be a central part of the popular Lowender Peran Festival in Perranporth in October 2013, to celebrate the revival of the sport in the Southwest and the start of the Bulldog Shinty League, the first shinty League south of Scotland in the 21st century. The start of the Bulldog Shinty League also marked the start of 3 new Cornish sides: Exeter University, Falmouth University and Camborne School of Mines Shinty Clubs.

Cornwall faced Caithness Shinty Club in a Land's End v John o' Groats Fixture in St Andrew's in May 2014. Cornwall winning 3-1.

Cornwall had a highly successful year in 2015 making a clean sweep in all English competitions as well as having a successful tour of Scotland.

Cornwall competed in the London Festival of Shinty in September 2016 but lost their title to London Camanachd

On 5 November at Lowender Peran Festival in Newquay, Cornwall played an International Select, winning 7–0. Cornwall Ladies also beat International Select Ladies 4–1.

Sunday 30 April 2017 saw Cornwall enter their senior side as well as a CSM side to the St Andrews Sixes in Scotland, whilst a number of the Cornish ladies were selected for ESA Ladies in the inaugural Ladies Challenge Cup against Cowal and Bute Ladies the same day. With wins over Dundee University 2s (7-0), St Andrews University 2s (10-0), Aberdour the current Fingal Shield Champions (2-0) and St Andrews Alumni 2s (4–1), the Seniors progressed to beat Dundee University 1-0 in the Semi-final, before finally succumbing to Aberdour in the final (1-3). The CSM team played well, narrowly missing out on progression to the knock-out stages. 2018 saw Cornwall saw Cornwall's Student team CSM win the Oxford 6s, beating 2 strong London sides as well as sides from Dundee University and the hosts Oxford. They lost out narrowly to London 1-2 at the London Festival of Shinty in Oct 2018. 2019 saw Cornwall Cornwall enter the newly formed English Shinty League, with wins over Devon and Development to date, they competed again at the 3 Sisters 6s Tournament at Musselborough, The Shinty Shop Challenge Cup (English Nationals) at Bath and a strong showing at St Andrews 6s May 5, 2019, where they beat Kintyre 4–1, St Andrews University 1st 2–0 and St Andrews Alumni 4–0 to progress to the semi-finals, where they met Kintyre a second time, following Kintyre's 3–2 win over Ardnamurchan. They beat Kintyre 5–0 in the semi-final before finally surcoming to ESA rivals London Camanchd 1-2 in a closely fought all ESA final showdown.

=== Cornwall Ladies ===
Cornwall ladies Shinty team was formed in 2012. Over that period the team has gone from strength to strength with ladies playing for Cornwall and also playing at a national level as part of the English Shinty Association (ESA) ladies team. The Cornwall ladies team has also played games in the English Shinty Championship in Bristol for the last few years and have performed at a high standard every time they have competed. The team have also been entered into several national Shinty tournaments such as at the London, Lowander Peran and St. Andrews Shinty Festivals. In 2015 the Cornish ladies travelled to Scotland as part of a Shinty tour and played against numerous Scottish ladies teams which helped the development of their squad. In 2016 the Cornwall Shinty Ladies beat a strong London side for the first time since their creation which showcased the true development of the team in the last few years and the talent that is emerging from within Cornwall. In addition to playing for Cornwall, many local ladies have been selected for the ladies ESA team to play in Scotland against different Scottish oppositions. In 2017, the ESA ladies side will be entering the Ladies Shinty Challenge Cup with many Cornwall ladies featuring strongly in the squad. The Cornwall ladies team has been formed by players with varied sporting backgrounds such as hockey and camogie.

20–21 May 2017 saw Cornwall Ladies Shinty host their first Ladies Tournament at the Dracaena Centre, Falmouth as Ladies from Ireland, Scotland and England assemble, with a Ceilidh afterwards

== 2022 Tour ==
Cornwall toured Scotland in 2022 to mark the club's 10th anniversary. They played Fort William, Skye Ladies, Ballachulish, Uddingston and Ardnamurchan.

== 2026 Tour ==
Cornwall toured again in Scotland, facing Inverness, Caberfeidh, Lochcarron, Skye, and Kilmallie before travelling to Warrington to face Manchester Shinty and the hurling team.
