= Caithness Shinty Club =

Scottish shinty team

- Full name: Caithness Shinty Club
- Gaelic name: Comann Camanachd Ghaillibh
- Nickname: The Wolves, The Panthers
- Founded: 2014
- Ground: Viewfirth Park; Thurso
- League: non-league
Home

Caithness Shinty Club is a defunct shinty team from Caithness, Scotland. They were the most northerly club in Scotland, based primarily in Thurso but pulling players from across the county.

== History ==
Whilst there was a shinty team for players working at Dounreay in the 1960s, Caithness had very little competitive shinty tradition since the early 20th century.

In the 2000s, efforts were made to develop shinty. Youth teams from Wick and Thurso competed in the Far North League established in 2007. Some players from Caithness team who competed in 2008 but this first attempt at national competition was highly unsuccessful.

The success of the Mod Cup at the Caithness Mod in 2010, where a Caithness select defeated Sutherland 3–1 sparked hopes that Naver, or a different Caithness club might be resurrected. However, shinty activity took a backseat as an instrumental founder of the Naver side, Kenny "Nostie" Macleod, who was also a minister in the Free Church of Scotland, died in April 2012.

However, the passing of Reverend MacLeod did result in the establishment of an annual match in his memory, which has led to the founding of a proper Caithness club. This annual fixture, first played in 2012 saw a Caithness side defeat Sutherland 5–4.

The trophy was then played for again in 2013 with Caithness losing on penalties to Sutherland.

== 2014 ==
In 2014, Caithness Shinty Club entered the St. Andrews 6-a-side shinty tournament for the first time, reaching the semi-finals on a run that included a win against local rivals Kinlochbervie Camanachd Club and a memorable 1–0 victory over league side and top seeds, Col-Glen Shinty Club. Caithness also played Cornwall Shinty Club in the inaugural Natural Retreats Shinty Challenge Cup, succumbing 2–1 to the duchy side.

Caithness Shinty Club entered the Inverness 6's for the first time in 2014, and despite being overpowered by some strong league sides, they managed to leave with their heads held high and far better for the experience. A second Natural Retreats Shinty Challenge Cup match was held versus Cornwall Shinty Club, with Caithness going down 2–1 again to an experienced Cornwall side.

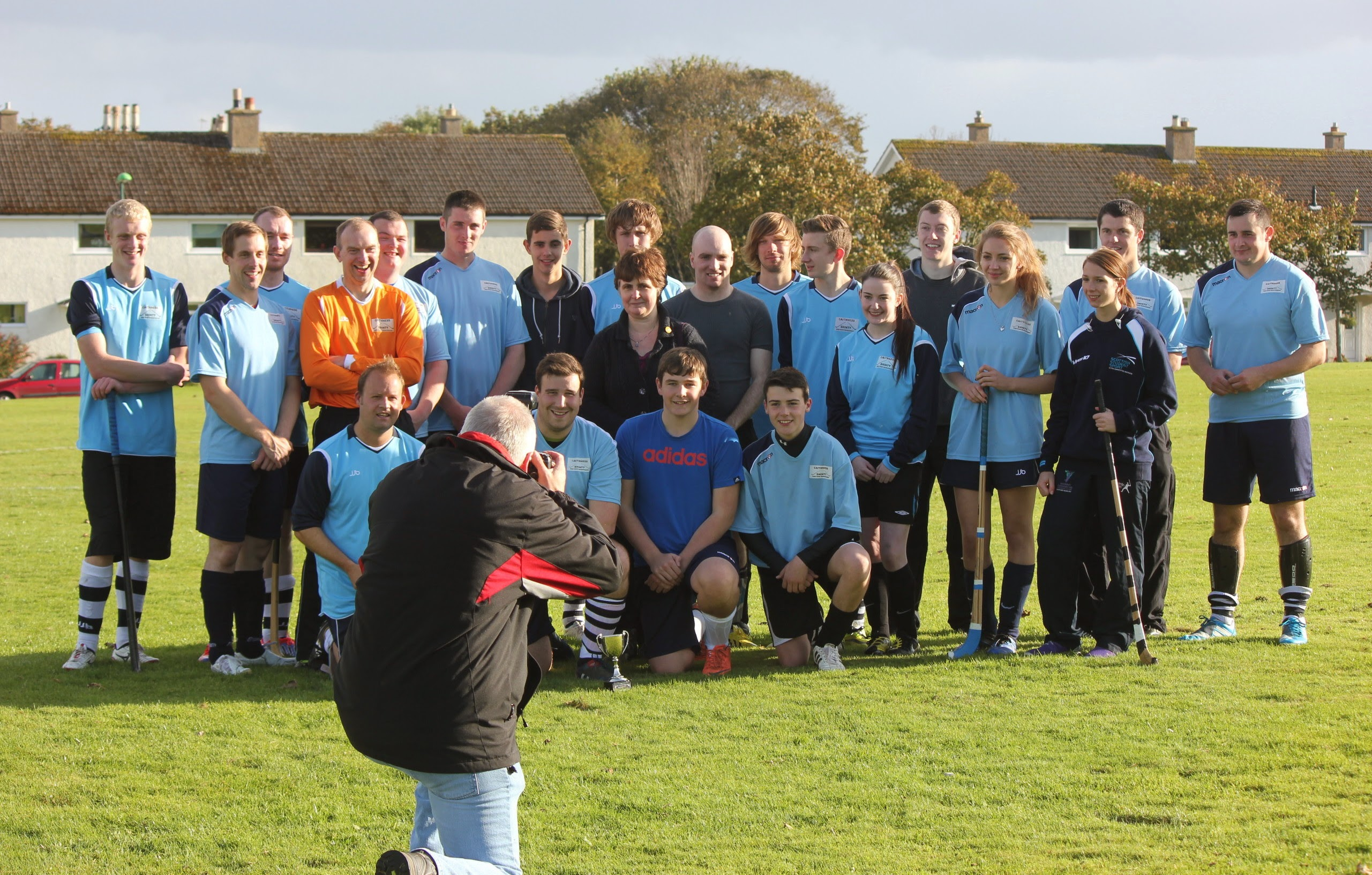
2014 Nostie Cup winning squad

On 19 August 2014, in the Holburn Hotel, Caithness Shinty Club held its inaugural general meeting and constituted the club for the first time. Since then the club has secured sponsorship deals with Ashley Ann Ltd, the Holburn Hotel and Scrabster Seafoods.

On Saturday 4 October 2014, Caithness defeated a Sutherland select side 4–3 to regain the Kenny "Nostie" MacLeod cup This was also a significant day as the Caithness starting line up all trained and resided in Caithness. The scorers for Caithness were Angus Thorburn x2, Chris Sinclair and Darren Douglas.

Caithness Shinty Club held its first club 6's tournament in November, 2014. Three teams entered, East Caithness, Thurso and West Caithness. Thurso came out victors, winning both their matches, East Caithness were runners-up.

Caithness Shinty Club secured a grant from Dounreay Site Restoration Limited which will assist in the procurement of equipment.

== 2015 ==
The club held its first New Year's Day beach shinty match in Thurso.

On 24 January, Caithness succumbed to a 4–2 friendly defeat to Kinlochbervie Camanachd Club at Naver Park, Thurso. The match was played despite 2–3 inches of snow.

Caithness travelled to Inverness to meet Inverness Shinty Club in a friendly on 21 February.

Caithness entered the Strathdearn Cup for the first time and received a home draw against Beauly Shinty Club, they succumbed 6–1 in a gritty performance. Luke Merchant scored the club's first ever senior goal.

== Future plans ==
The club aimed to enter the National league set up in 2017, thus completing the journey from non-league level to senior level. The club also plans to establish a Women's team. However, whilst it is still expected that Caithness will join the leagues, the long term viability of shinty in the area was put under threat by the possible destruction of the club's park, the only proper-sized area for shinty in the region, for a four lane athletics track.

However, the club secured a park in association with the local rugby club and while this augured well for future plans, a lack of player commitment resulted in the club still only competing in the cups in 2017.

In 2018, Caithness only competed in a couple of sixes tournaments.

== Honours ==
- Mod Cup – 2010
- Kenny "Nostie" MacLeod Cup – 2012, 2014
