= Mod Cup =

The Mod Cup (Scottish Gaelic Cupa a' Mhòid), also known as the Aviemore Cup, is a trophy in the sport of shinty first competed for in 1969, traditionally played for by the two teams who are based closest to the host venue of the Royal National Mod. The current holders are Ballachulish.(2025)

Since 2018 there has been a women's trophy presented as well, this is also known as the LearnGaelic Challenge Cup.

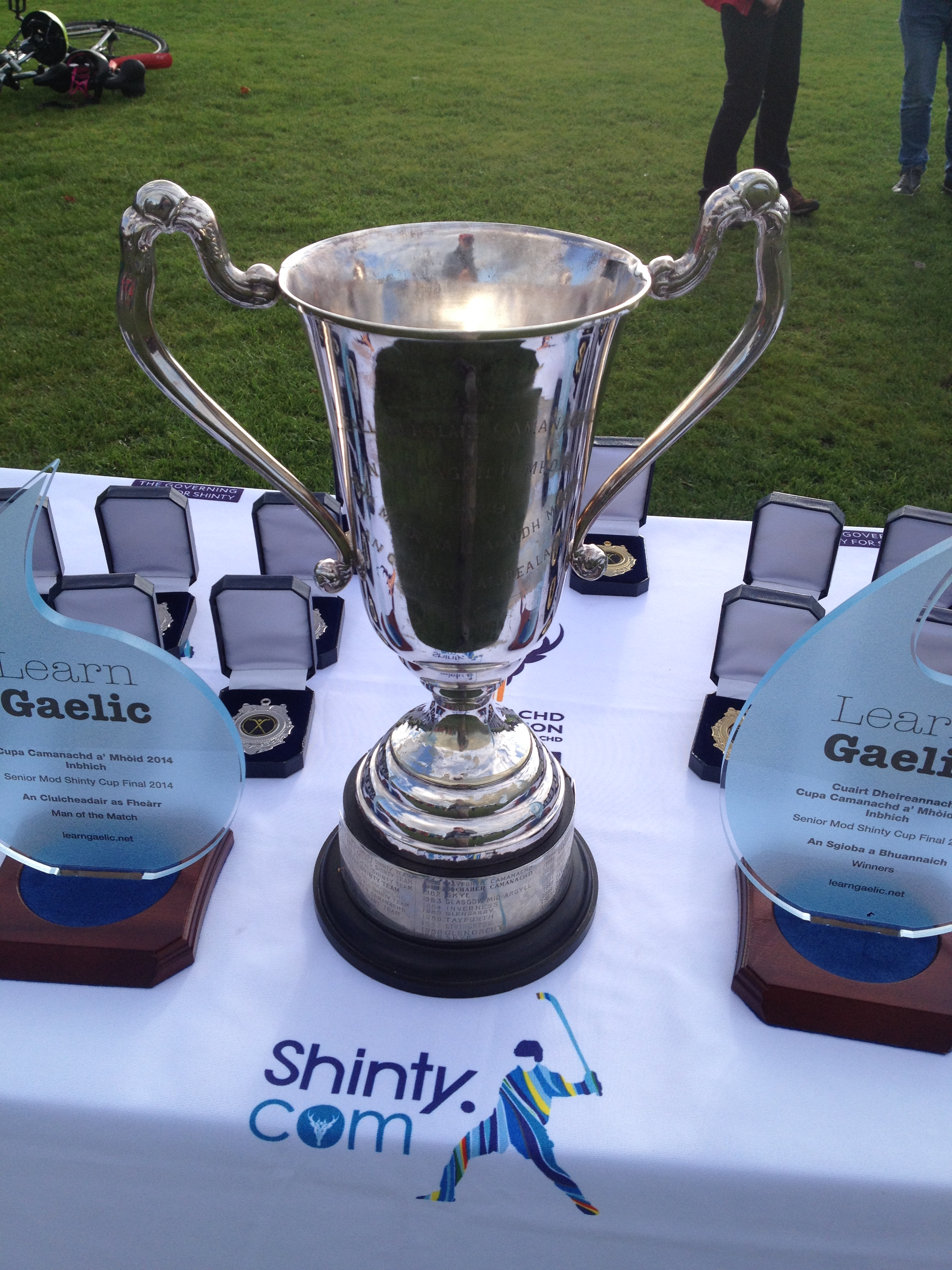
The Mod Cup, played for annually at the Royal National Mod

== History ==
The Cup is presented by the Aviemore branch of An Comunn Gaidhealach as part of the week-long Mod as a celebration of shinty's links with Scottish Gaelic. The trophy originally had a lid which has been lost. The first running of the cup was in 1969 as the Mod was held in Aviemore and the two closest sides were the sport's historic giants, Kingussie and Newtonmore. Newtonmore won the first running of the cup 5-2 and to this day the Mod Cup is perhaps the one trophy that the club is eligible to compete for that Kingussie has never won.

Over the years, the Mod has been held in towns without shinty teams which has resulted in teams being imported (Stornoway Mods in the 1980s, when Beauly Shinty Club and Skye Camanachd or in areas with a plethora of shinty teams, such as the Lochaber Mod 2007 when a select Lochaber East Side played Lochaber West in Ardnamurchan. The expansion of shinty into areas where it had previously not been played for a long time means that there should be teams from that locale competing for the trophy in the future. This was the case with the Caithness Mod in 2010 and the Western Isles Mod in 2011.

The 2004 fixture was played between Tayforth and Edinburgh East Lothian, at South Inch, Perth. The 2008 fixture was to be competed for between Aberdour Shinty Club and Glasgow Mid-Argyll at Little Kerse, Grangemouth as part of the Mod in Falkirk. However, the fixture was rained off.

The 2009 fixture was played between Lochside Rovers and Oban Celtic at Mossfield Park, Oban on 10 October 2009 as part of a normal league fixture which Lochside won. The Cup provides many smaller teams with an opportunity to win national silverware.

The 2010 fixture between Caithness and Sutherland was a historic game as it was the most northerly official shinty game ever played. Caithness won 3–1.

The 2011 final was played in Uist, and was contested between Uist and Lewis, with Lewis gaining revenge over their 2005 conquerors, winning 2–0.

In 2016 on the west side of Lewis, Skye recorded a 3–0 victory over their island rivals in wet and windy conditions. Goals from Peter Gordon, Iain MacLellan, and Kenny MacLeod took the Mod Cup over the sea to Skye.

== Men's Winners ==
- 2026 Glasgow Mid Argyll 5 vs Aberdour 1
- 2025 Ballachullish 3 vs Ardnamurchan 2
- 2023 Strachur-Dunoon 4 v Glasgow University 1, Renfrew
- 2022 Aberdour 2 v Tayforth 2, Aberdour win on penalties, Perth
- 2021 Inverness 2 v Strathglass 2, Inverness win on penalties, Inverness
- 2020 No Competition due to Mòd Postponement
- 2019 GMA 0 v Bute 0, GMA win on penalties 3–1, Glasgow Green, Glasgow
- 2018 Inveraray bt Col-Glen, Dunoon
- 2017 Kilmallie 3 v 2 Fort William, at An Aird, Fort William (played in 2018)
- 2016 Skye Camanachd 3 v 0 Lewis Camanachd, at Shawbost, Isle of Lewis
- 2015 Oban Camanachd bt Glenurquhart, at Mossfield Stadium, Oban
- 2014 Boleskine 4 v 2 Inverness, at Bught Park, Inverness
- 2013 Bute 1 v 1 Glasgow Mid Argyll, Bute won after penalty shoot-out, at Thornly Park Campus, Paisley
- 2012 Kyles Athletic 9 v 1 Bute, at Dunoon
- 2011 Lewis Camanachd 2 v 0 Uist Camanachd, at Uist
- 2010 Caithness Shinty Club 3 v 1 Sutherland, at Wick
- 2009 Lochside Rovers bt Oban Celtic, at Mossfield, Oban
- 2008 Match between Aberdour and Glasgow Mid-Argyll abandoned due to weather, at Grangemouth
- 2007 West Lochaber bt East Lochaber, at Ardnamurchan
- 2006 Strachur & District bt Col-Glen
- 2005 Uist Camanachd 3 v 0 Lewis Camanachd, at Lionacleit
- 2004 Tayforth bt Edinburgh East Lothian, at South Inch, Perth
- 2003 Oban Camanachd bt Oban Celtic
- 2002 Kyles Athletic 1 v 0 Bute, at Largs
- 2001 Kyleakin Primary School 11 v 0 Back Camanachd, at Tarbert, Harris
- 2000 Kyles Athletic
- 1999 Fort William
- 1998 Skye Camanachd
- 1997 Strathglass
- 1996 Tayforth bt Strathclyde Police
- 1995 Caberfeidh
- 1994 Kyles Athletic bt Strachur 4-0 (not recorded on trophy)Nicholson hits four as Kyles win the Mod Cup
- 1993 Inveraray bt GMA 7–1, at Airdrie
- 1992 Oban Camanachd bt Oban Celtic 5–0, at Oban
- 1991 Caberfeidh
- 1990, No Competition
- 1989, Skye Camanachd 4 v 2 Beauly, at Bayhead, Stornoway
- 1988, Glenorchy bt Strachur, at Bishopbriggs
- 1987, Livingston bt Glasgow University
- 1986, Tayforth, at Peffermill
- 1985, Glengarry
- 1984, Inverness bt Boleskine
- 1983, Glasgow Mid-Argyll bt Strathclyde Police
- 1982, Skye Camanachd, at King George V Playing Field, Skye
- 1981, Lochaber won a tournament involving Invergarry, Fort William and Kilmallie
- 1980, Tayforth bt Livingston
- 1979, Lochcarron 5 v 3 Skye Camanachd
- 1978, Oban Celtic bt Oban Camanachd
- 1977, Glenurquhart 3 v 0 Beauly, at Brora, Sutherland
- 1976, Aberdeen Camanachd bt Aberdeen University
- 1975, Glasgow Mid-Argyll bt Kyles Athletic
- 1974, Aberdeen Camanachd bt Tayforth
- 1973, No Competition 70th, 1973 - Royal National Mòd Programmes and fringe events > Royal National Mòd Programmes > Programme of the ... annual Mod - An Comunn Gaidhealach - National Library of Scotland, game scheduled but no teams elected to play
- 1972, Lovat bt Inverness at Bught Park
- 1971, Glasgow Mid-Argyll (GMA)
- 1970, Oban Celtic bt Oban Camanachd, at Oban
- 1969, Newtonmore 5 v 2 Kingussie, at Aviemore

Club	Total	Years
Oban Camanachd	4	1992, 2003, 2009* (Lochside Rovers), 2015
Oban Celtic	2	1970, 1978
Skye Camanachd	4	1982, 1989, 1998, 2016
Kilmallie	1	2017
Lochaber	1	1981
Newtonmore	1	1969
Aberdour	1	2022
Fort William	1	1999
Uist Camanachd	1	2005
West Lochaber	1	2007
Caithness	1	2010
Boleskine	1	2014
Inverness	2	1984, 2021
Kyleakin Primary School	1	2001
Camanachd Leòdhais	1	2011
Strathglass	1	1997
Glenurquhart	1	1977
Lovat	1	1972
Strachur	1	2006
Strachur-Dunoon Shinty Club	1	2023
Inveraray	2	1993, 2018
Glenorchy	1	1988
Aberdeen Camanachd	2	1974, 1976
Glengarry	1	1985
Lochcarron Camanachd	1	1979
Caberfeidh	2	1991, 1995
Kyles Athletic	4	1994, 2000, 2002, 2012
Bute	1	2013
Livingston	1	1987
Glasgow Mid-Argyll	5	1971, 1975, 1983, 2019, 2026
Tayforth	4	1980, 1986, 1996, 2004

== Women's Mòd Cup Winners ==
- 2026 Glasgow Mid Argyll bt Glasgow University 3-1, Glasgow
- 2022, Aberdour bt Tayforth, 3–0, Perth
- 2021, Inverness bt Alba, Inverness
- 2019, GMA bt Bute, Glasgow
- 2018, Oban Lorn bt Cowal & Bute, Dunoon
