= Shawbost =

Village in the Isle of Lewis, Scotland

Coordinates: 58.324°N 6.681°W

Shawbost: Scottish Gaelic: Siabost
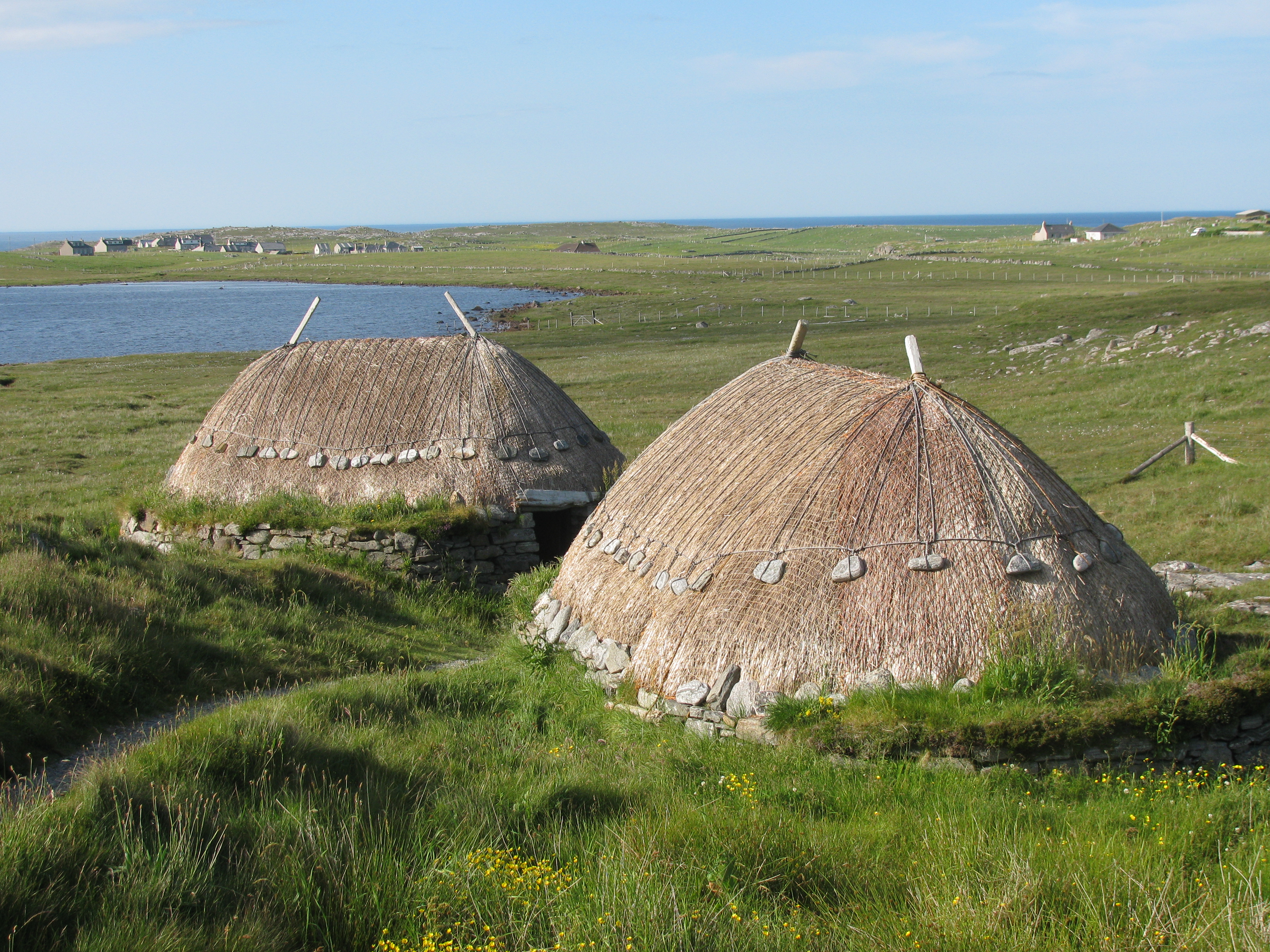
- The Norse mill and kiln at Shawbost

- Location within the Outer Hebrides
- Population: 500
- OS grid reference: NB259467
- Civil parish: Barvas
- Council area: Na h-Eileanan Siar
- Lieutenancy area: Western Isles
- Country: Scotland
- Sovereign state: United Kingdom
- Post town: ISLE OF LEWIS
- Postcode district: HS2
- Dialling code: 01851
- Police: Scotland
- Fire: Scottish
- Ambulance: Scottish
- UK Parliament: Na h-Eileanan an Iar
- Scottish Parliament: Na h-Eileanan an Iar
- Website: siabost.co.uk

Shawbost (Scottish Gaelic: Siabost) is a large village in the West Side of the Isle of Lewis. The village of Shawbost has a population of around 500 and lies around 20 miles (30 kilometres) west of Lewis's capital Stornoway. Shawbost is within the parish of Barvas. A recent development in the village was the renovation of the old school into the new community centre. The scattered settlement is split into three sections: North Shawbost (Siabost bho Thuath), South Shawbost (Siabost bho Dheas) and New Shawbost (Pàirc Shiaboist). There is a small museum of folk life and nearby is a small stone circle. The village is overlooked by a small hill named Beinn Bhragair, 261 m high. Shawbost is a prominent village on the Isle of Lewis, due to the school, community centre, beach and Harris Tweed mill.

In the 2001 United Kingdom Census, 72% of people in Shawbost reported being able to speak Scottish Gaelic.

== Shawbost School ==
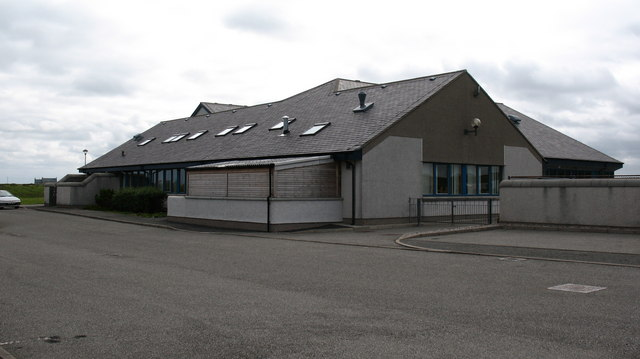
The new school at Siabost

The local school has both secondary and primary teaching units. Shawbost School has a roll of 86 pupils between 5–14 years of age. The school is also an optional secondary school for children from the neighbouring villages of Carloway, Bragar, Arnol, Bru and Barvas. The children's other option is to transfer directly to the Nicolson Institute in Stornoway.

The present school building was opened in 1992 and provided the village, along with the neighbouring villages, with various facilities. These facilities include a community library, games hall, swimming pool, outdoor football park and shinty, all which can be used by the public in addition to a kitchen and meeting rooms.

The school has both permanently based teachers and visiting staff who also teach at other local schools. This allows the children to receive the best education possible in subjects such as art and music.

The school is as of May 2011 the home of shinty in Lewis. It is the home park of Lewis Camanachd.

== Ionad Na Seann Sgoil ==
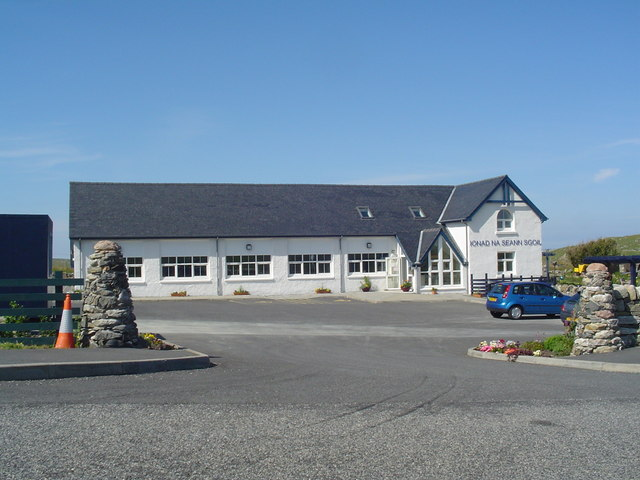
The Old School has been modernised and turned into an enterprise base and local government offices

Ionad Na Seann Sgoil (Old School Centre) is Shawbost's community centre. The community centre had been the village's first school until the new school was built. The building was then used as a nursery school for a short while until the building came into disrepair. It was then abandoned for many years, but was rebuilt at a cost of nearly £1 million and used as the village's new community centre; it was opened in September 2005.

The purpose of the community centre was to serve the needs of the local community, both young and old, and of the wider community, extending beyond the West Side to the entire island. Thus the centre became home to many new facilities, including an auditorium which can seat around 75 people but can be folded and stored away so that the room can be used for dances and other events. A museum is contained in the building displaying local historical artefacts as well as much literature about the local history and people, and the archives of the West Side Historical Society.

There is also a community kitchen which is used as a café in summer for visitors to the local museum and also for tourists passing through the village en route to another of Lewis's many historical sites. The centre also contains a conference room, fitness suite and a croileagan, which is a nursery in which the children are taught in Gaelic. Outside the centre is a community garden which was created over a number of years.

Finally the community centre contains a youth café which has modern equipment to keep the local youth entertained. Facilities include a PC suite, games consoles with high-definition televisions and various musical equipment, among others.

== Shawbost Beach ==
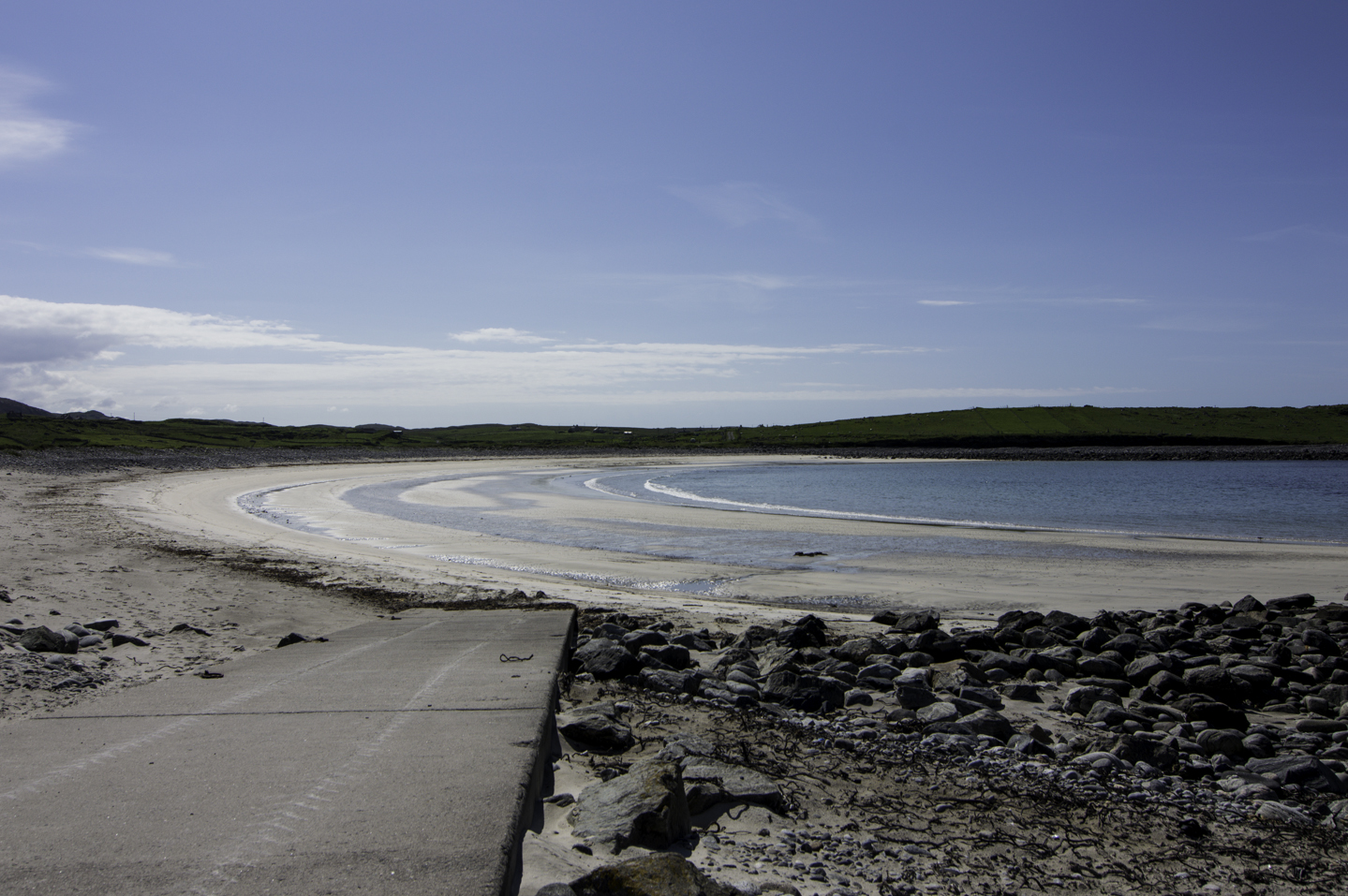
Shawbost beach

Shawbost beach is one of many beautiful beaches on the Isle of Lewis. It is reached by one of two single-track roads, one arriving at the beach from each side, which diverge from the main road. The beach is about 200 metres (700 feet) long and has a slipway on the left hand side. On either side of the beach are crags as well as cliffs; there is a coastal walk from Dail Beag to Bragar. The beach is usually very quiet, even in summer.

== Shawbost in film ==
- 1973: The Highlands and Islands - A Royal Tour, a documentary about Prince Charles' visit to the Highlands and Islands, directed by Oscar Marzaroli, in which Prince Charles is seen visiting MacLeod's woollen mill.
