= Hebridean Celtic Festival =

Performing arts festival in Lewis and Harris, Scotland

Coordinates: 58.21093°N 6.39314°W

- Lews Castle, the festival's venue
- Genre: Celtic music
- Frequency: Annual
- Locations: Stornoway, Outer Hebrides, Scotland
- Years active: 1996–present
- Inaugurated: 18 June 1996; 30 years ago
- Most recent: 15–18 July 2026
- Next event: 14–17 July 2027
- Attendance: 16,000
- Capacity: 16,000
- Website: www.hebceltfest.com

The Hebridean Celtic Festival, (Scottish Gaelic: Fèis Cheilteach Innse Gall) or HebCelt, is an international Scottish music festival, which takes place annually in Stornoway on Lewis, in the Outer Hebrides of Scotland. Headliners to date include Runrig, Van Morrison, Deacon Blue, the Fratellis, the Levellers and KT Tunstall. Many other acts take part in the event, including visiting international artists, solo artists and local musicians. The festival regularly attracts over 16,000 attendees and provides significant economic and cultural benefits for its host area.

The main arena is situated on the Castle Green, in front of Lews Castle. Other events take place in the An Lanntair arts centre and elsewhere in Stornoway. There are also concerts in the villages of Borve and Breasclete in Lewis, and Northton in Harris.

== History ==
The event was first held from 18 to 22 June 1996 and attracted a crowd of around 1,000 people who were mainly drawn from the local area. Acts at the inaugural festival included Dougie MacLean, Wolfstone and Natalie MacMaster, and it additionally consisted of lessons in playing the Celtic harp and singing in Gaelic along with performances of poetry.

The second event was held from 16 to 19 July 1997 and additionally featured La Bottine Souriante, Alasdair Fraser and Kate and Anna McGarrigle.

The Festival also offers workshops, street arts, Gaelic storytelling, language tasters, and opportunities to explore the rich culture and heritage of the Outer Hebrides.

In 2002, the Hothouse Flowers, who were headlining at that year's festival, had to be chartered to Stornoway Airport from Glasgow following issues with delayed transport and lost luggage, including instruments, which resulted in them arriving late for the departure for Stornoway. The operation required the airport to stay open past regular business hours.

In 2007 an inter-island shinty match was added to the programme, with Lewis Camanachd and Uist Camanachd competing for the HebCelt Trophy.

In 2009 the event was voted 'Event of the Year' at the Scot Trad Music Awards, the annual awards ceremony organised by Hands up for Trad, celebrating Scottish traditional music. The festival scooped the 'Best Large Event' at the Scottish Event Awards in October 2011 and was voted one of the top 10 music global festival by Songlines in both 2011 and 2012.

The 2020 event was cancelled due to the COVID-19 pandemic with all tickets ultimately refunded after the 2021 event was also unable to proceed. In lieu of that year's festival, HebCelt commissioned local performers to be part of Seisean HebCelt, a collection of performances uploaded to the Internet and a fundraiser for the Stornoway-based Bethesda Hospice.

The Hebridean Celtic Festival, now in its 30th year, continues to attract a range of visitors. Over the years around ten per cent of the visitors have come from around the world, around forty per cent from other parts of the UK.

== Past bands performing at the Hebridean Celtic Festival ==
The event has featured main acts including Van Morrison, The Fratellis, Deacon Blue, Imelda May, The Shires, Capercaillie, Dougie MacLean, The Red Hot Chilli Pipers, Battlefield Band, Lau, Karine Polwart, The Hot Seats, The Travelling Band, KT Tunstall, Peat & Diesel, Tide Lines, Arthur Cormack & Blair Douglas, Kathleen Macinnes Band, Iain Morrison, The Boy Who Trapped The Sun, Rusty Shackle, Fatherson, Face the West, Rose Parade, The Dirty Beggars et al. The following list includes artists that have featured at the festival

- The Proclaimers
- Van Morrison
- Runrig
- The Saw Doctors
- Big Country
- Imelda May
- Capercaillie
- Fiddlers' Bid
- Salsa Celtica
- Davy Spillane
- Natalie MacMaster
- Dougie MacLean
- The Waterboys
- Moving Hearts
- Peatbog Faeries
- Treacherous Orchestra
- Julie Fowlis
- Red Hot Chilli Pipers
- Four Men and a Dog
- Niteworks
- Larkin Poe
