= Kinlochbervie Camanachd Club =

Kinlochbervie
- Full name: Kinlochbervie Camanachd Club
- Gaelic name: Comann Camanachd Cheann Loch Biorbhaidh
- Nickname: KLB
- Founded: 2007
- Ground: Kinlochbervie
- Manager: Heather MacNeil/Duncan Clark
- League: Development League
Home

Kinlochbervie Camanachd Club is a shinty club from Kinlochbervie, Sutherland, Scotland.

== History ==
Shinty was traditionally played throughout the Highlands of Scotland until the early 20th century when it died off in many areas and there was a tradition of play in North West Sutherland.

In 2007, as part of Highland 2007, the pupils of Kinlochbervie High School took a vote and decided to spend more time playing shinty. This led to Kinlochbervie being a founder member of the Far North Shinty League in 2007. The club also supplied some players to Naver Athletic, the first team from Sutherland to compete in national shinty.

In their first season in 2007–2008, Kinlochbervie came second in the Far North League to Farr. They finished just behind Farr again in the same position for the 2008–2009 season. This season they finished in 1st place ahead of their rivals Farr Camanachd.

In 2011, the club entered the Development League run by the Camanachd Association and also took a trip to Ireland to play Shinty/Hurling. The club defeated Strathspey in their final match 6–5.
