= AberFest =

Cultural festival in Cornwall, England

AberFest is a Celtic cultural festival celebrating all things Cornish and Breton that takes place every second year in Cornwall, UK, around Easter. The AberFest Festival alternates with the Breizh – Kernow Festival which is held in Brandivy or Bignan in Brittany, alternating between those two Breton locations.

Both festivals are unusual in that the main focus of the events is on families and individuals from one country staying with families and individuals from the other, against a wide background of cultural activities.

An AberFest was last held at Easter 2024. The next AberFest will be in 2026.

== Background ==
Cornwall and Brittany have Celtic links going back centuries and have closely related Celtic languages and many other traditions that are practised in both countries. Both AberFest and the Breizh – Kernow Festival celebrate these cultures in their traditional and more recent forms.

5th–7th centuries saw a mass emigration of Cornish people to "Armorica." These people were to become the Breton people of modern Brittany. Their language was the Brythonic Celtic language that was to become Breton language (Brezhoneg) in Brittany, the Cornish language (Kernewek) in Cornwall and the Welsh language (Cymraeg) in Wales. Although they are separate languages today they remain closely related.

Throughout the centuries since the first emigrations, there have been continued links and movements of people, up to and including the Second World War, when small numbers of Breton people escaped German-occupied Brittany to live in Cornwall.

While the practical working lives of ordinary fishermen were a common sight in ports in both Cornwall and Brittany in the 1960s and later, other links have gone through periods of popularity, including Cornish and Breton wrestling. This saw regular exchange competitions in the inter war years and sporadic interest ever since.

== The modern era ==
The late 1970s and 1980s saw a great deal of interest in Inter Celtic organisations and activities. The International Celtic Congress had been very active in the Celtic world through much of the 20th century, but saw a new enthusiasm in Cornwall as the "Cornish movement" looked to other Celtic countries for support and ideas in facing the decline in cultural self-confidence that was very evident at that time. Around the same time the Pan Celtic Festivals had led to the establishment of an independent Inter Celtic festival, "Lowender Peran" in Perranporth, Cornwall each October.

As visitors to this Festival, Katrine Pasco and her husband Patrick Lorho, travelled to Cornwall and made friends with a wide number of people with loose involvement with the Cornish movement including Ron Williams (Ronnie) from Falmouth. After several years of visiting Lowender Peran and strengthening links, Pasco and Lorho, organised the first "Breizh – Kernow Festival" in 1987 (Breizh being Breton for Brittany and Kernow being Cornish for Cornwall) in Brandivy, in the Morbihan region of Brittany.

== Breizh – Kernow Festival ==
The Breizh – Kernow Festival was started with the intention of it being at the Breton part of a Festival alternating between Brittany and Cornwall. The Breizh – Kernow festival was then held most years in Brandivy and later included Bignan. This one sided arrangement persisted until 2002.

The main reason that the festival was not held in Cornwall was that there was a community of like minded people in more or less one geographical location in Brandivy. In Cornwall the links were less involved with a location and more to do with individuals that were spread geographically across Cornwall without a clear location that could be realistically identified as suitable location, nor was there anyone willing to take on the task without such a generally accepted suitable location.

== Ron Williams ==
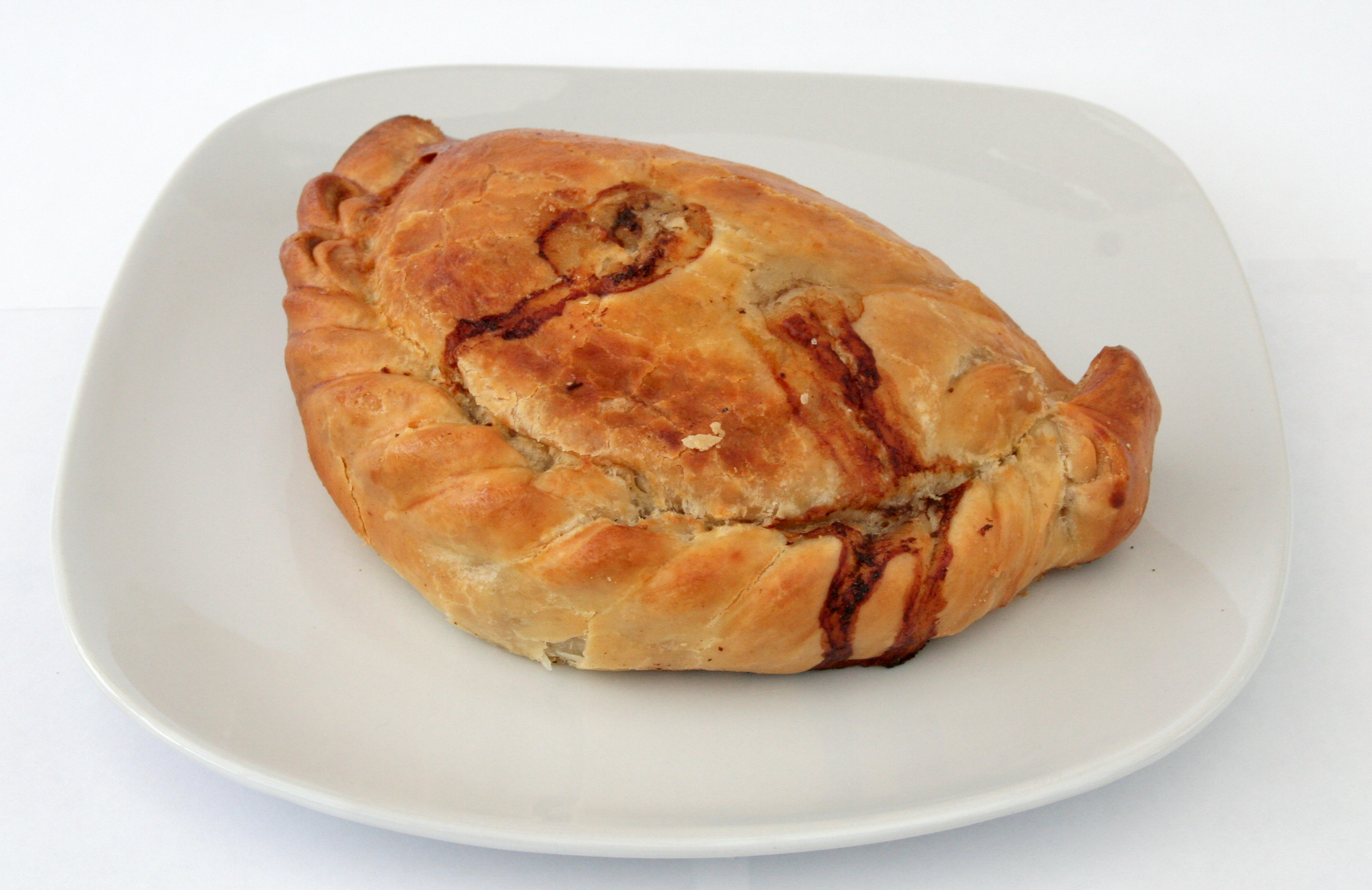
A Cornish pasty

Ron Williams had been a very active individual with many voluntary organisations in Falmouth ( a founder of the Falmouth Youth Club,) and throughout Cornwall and was widely known and respected.

From 1987 onwards, the friendship between Williams and Pasco, Lorho and their increasing family grew stronger with Williams spending more and more time in his retirement, living with Castel Guen, Brandivy. He also became an increasingly well known and popular figure in Brandivy itself.

== Ronnie Fest ==
Ron Williams died on 7 December 2001.

As a memorial, in particular for Bretons the "Ronnie Fest" took place in Falmouth at Easter 2002. Supported by groups such as Cornish dance team "Ros Keltek" the day filled the weekend.

This was a day of celebration of Ron's life and included organisations and groups with which Ron had worked, in some cases for 40–50 years. Due to the good will towards Ron Williams, in the Falmouth venues, and time were given for free. This included the Easter Sunday afternoon at the Royal Polytechniic Society, and the British Legion Club on the Easter Sunday evening 31 March 2002.

== The first AberFest ==
After a return to Brittany at Easter 2003, the Festival returned to Cornwall as "AberFest’04" and again in 2006, 2008, 2010, 2012 and 2014 as AberFest’06, AberFest'08, AberFest'10, AberFest'12 and AberFest'14.

== Festival philosophy ==
Central to the aims of both Breizh – Kernow and AberFest Festivals is the arrangement whereby individuals and families are hosted by families from the respective countries. People visiting the festival from one Celtic country stay with families from the host Celtic country.

While there are public events that form the "public" side of the festivals, it is hosting and being hosted with families that is the core of the success of both the festivals. Through this arrangement, lifelong friendships have developed outside the confines of either festival.

The personal friendships between individuals and families form a strength and commitment to the relationship between the two festivals. The importance of the personal relationships has not been understood by some who have seen the more public events as of the prime importance and have mistakenly viewed the way to strengthening the festivals, and AberFest in particular, through greater commercialisation of the events.

Today the basic philosophy continues that performers are not paid and perform for free, putting performers on an equal footing and providing a platform for new and in particular younger performers.

A significant contrast between the two festivals is a reflection on the Cultural strengths within both countries. While Breton culture in Brittany is well established, accepted as part of their regional identity and is not under exceptional pressures within the French State, the situation within Cornwall remains different.

The burgeoning cultural revival within Cornwall now enjoys a greater confidence than in the 1970s or 1980s but it is not universally recognised or accepted, often remaining opaque to those outside the movement.

== AberFest Festival format ==
Although AberFest is a relatively new event, it has established a general event Format:-

Good Friday Breton guests arrive at suitable Rendezvous via the Roscoff – Plymouth Ferry, by car and bus, in the late evening. They meet their hosts and travel to their homes. A welcoming event includes music by the groups involved in the festival.

Easter Saturday Free Public performances and processions through Falmouth. A combined dance/concert event featuring Breton Fest Noz and Cornish Ceili, known as the AberFest-Noz takes place in the evening.

Easter Sunday Morning and lunch with host families followed by a public event at a particular location in West/mid Cornwall. ( previous locations have included Godolphin House and St. Michael's Mount. ) Workshops in various cultural activities ( these were held on the Saturday in previous years)

Easter Monday: known as Rons Day: morning with families. Afternoon group event. Evening, Group party and Miracle.

== Bryl and Bryl Byghan ==
The icon used for the festival is that of a Mackerel. This has been embodied in various large "mascot" mackerel that have become part of the festival in their own right. Mackerel are fish common to the coasts of both Cornwall and Brittany. The word mackerel also has certain sexual connotations in both cultures.

At the end of each Festival a mackerel known as "Bryl Byghan" (Cornish for "small mackerel") is "born" in a ceremony called "The Miracle." Bryl Byghan is about 2 feet (70 cm) long. After the end of the festival, Bryl Byghan is taken back to Brittany and is passed from family to family during the following year. The following Easter,( approximately 12 months after the Miracle) the festival is held in Brittany. At the end of the Breizh-Kernow festival, Bryl Byghan returns to spend most of the next year circulating with families in Cornwall.

About 2 weeks before the following AberFest, Bryl Byghan drops out of sight to reappear at the start of AberFest as Bryl (Cornish for "mackerel") The "grown up" mascot mackerel is about 4 foot (1.5 m) long and becomes the focus of the festival, passing from person to person and it is taken to all events. Bryl is also used as a flag to identify where AberFest host families are during the Festival. In more recent AberFests Byl's appearance has been greeted by the singing of "you are my mackerel" to the tune of you are my sunshine.

As the festival draws to a close, Bryl "dies" in a special "funeral" (Mort de Bryl) As the festival ends, the "dead" Bryl is given to a Breton, selected by previous "dead" Bryl receiving Bretons, who are known as "The Guardians of Bryl." The Guardians of Bryl are also responsible for Bryl's well-being during the festival. The Bryl "funeral" ends with the "miracle" of a "new" Bryl Byghan being "born" to be passed to the Breton families for the next cycle of festivals in Brittany and Cornwall.

Bryl Byghan's adventures with families in Brittany and Cornwall have become events in their own right. Bryl Byghan has become a Facebook member with his own Facebook profile and friends. Regular updates and photographs are posted during the year between festivals.

The success of Bryl and Bryl Byghan has led to the Breizh – Kernow Festival in Brittany adopting a "Cock" as their "mascot." So far the Cock's adventures remain in Bryl Byghan's shadow. Rumours of a Bryl / Cock offspring have led to the anticipation of events in 2011 at the Breizh – Kernow festival in Brittany.

Many Breizh – Kernow family members were present to witness the marriage in Brittany of the Cock to Bryl in 2011. A wedding breakfast reception followed in the village hall and was as surreal and joyous as the wedding itself. No one knew who was in the giant Bryl costume but John Dudding, the architect of the event and long time supporter of the festival and Cornish and Breton Culture in general, was strangely absent throughout.

== Cornish and Breton cultural activities ==
Cornish and Breton cultural activities and workshops in previous AberFest festivals have included:- Dance Music Singing, ( individual, group and Choir) Wrestling ( Breton Gouwren and Cornish Wrestling ) Bombard and Pipes (Bagpipes) Cooking and Language ( Brezhoneg and Kernewek)

== See also ==
- List of topics related to Cornwall
- Cornish language
- Cornish people
- List of Cornish people
- Cornish Assembly
