= Brandivy =

Commune in Brittany, France

Brandivy Brandevi
- Commune
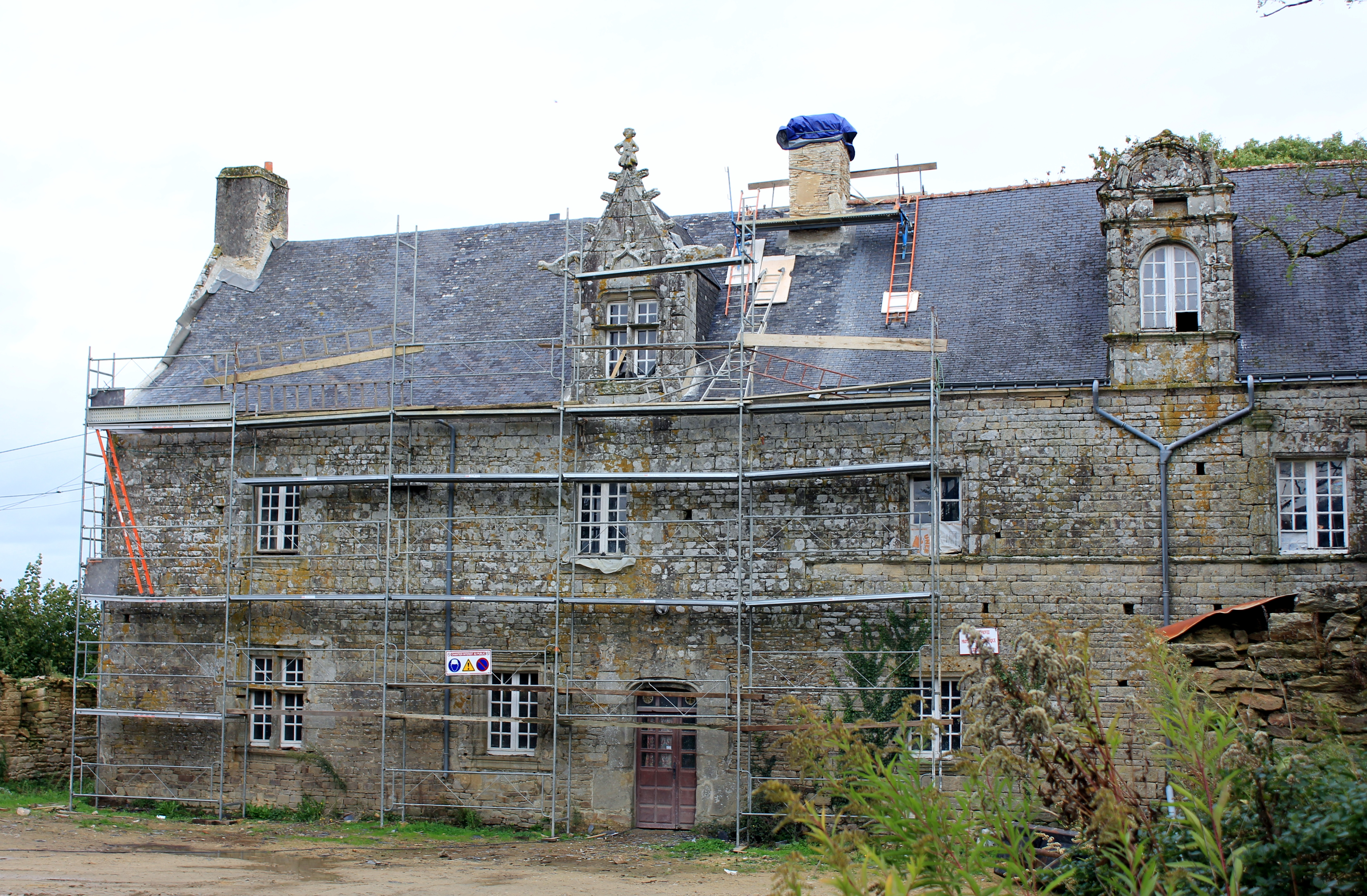
- The Manor of Kergal
- Location of Brandivy
- Location within France Location within Brittany
- Coordinates: 47°46′29″N 2°56′39″W
- Country: France
- Region: Brittany
- Department: Morbihan
- Arrondissement: Vannes
- Canton: Grand-Champ
- Intercommunality: Golfe du Morbihan - Vannes Agglomération

Government
  - Mayor (2026–32): Guillaume Grannec
- Area^{1}: 25.88 km^{2} (9.99 sq mi)
- Highest elevation: 171 m (561 ft)
- Lowest elevation: 28 m (92 ft)
- Population (2023): 1,466
  - Density: 56.65/km^{2} (146.7/sq mi)
- Time zone: UTC+01:00 (CET)
  - Summer (DST): UTC+02:00 (CEST)
- INSEE/Postal code: 56022 /56390
- ^{1} French Land Register data, which excludes lakes, ponds, glaciers > 1 km^{2} (0.386 sq mi or 247 acres) and river estuaries.

Brandivy (French pronunciation: [bʁɑ̃divi]; Breton: Brandevi) is a commune in the Morbihan department of Brittany in northwestern France.

== Population ==
Inhabitants of Brandivy are called in French Brandivyens.

== Breizh-Kernow Festival ==
Brandivy is notable for its "Breizh – Kernow Festival" (Breizh = Brittany in Breton; Kernow = Cornwall, United Kingdom, in the Cornish language) which takes place at Easter. The Festival started in 1987 taking place most years until 2002 when the festival started to alternate with the "AberFest" festival in Cornwall. The Breizh – Kernow Festival now occurs on odd numbered years (2003, 2005, 2007) and AberFest on even numbered years (2004, 2006 and due at Easter 2008). In recent years, Brandivy has shared festival events with Bignan.

Both festivals celebrate the ancient Celtic cultural, musical, linguistic and other ancient links between Cornwall and Brittany. An exceptional aspect of the festival is that it is centred on families. Families in each country hosting guest families from the other country, reciprocating the following year. This has developed to create very close, international family links between participants in Cornwall and Brittany which now spread over more than 20 years.

== See also ==
- Communes of the Morbihan department
