= Lochbroom Camanachd =

Lochbroom
- Full name: Lochbroom Camanachd
- Gaelic name: Comann Camanachd Loch Bhraoin
- Nickname: The 'Broom
- Founded: 1992/2005
- Ground: Inverlael
- Manager: Iain McFadyen
- League: Non-League
- 2014: 5th (ND3)
Home	Away

Lochbroom Camanachd is a shinty club from Ullapool, Scotland. It was active 1992−2000 then 2006−2015. As of 2015, the club has been abeyance at senior level.

== History ==
The club was founded in 1992 but went into abeyance in 2000, however the club maintained a youth system which eventually reaped dividends and the club re-emerged at senior level in 2005 thanks to the efforts of Ruaraidh Hughes. Hughes was nominated for the BBC's Unsung Hero Award at 2005's BBC Sports Personality of the Year due to a combination of his young age and struggles with Haemophilia. The club re-entered senior shinty in 2006 to play in North Division 3,

The first season back in the senior ranks in 2006 saw the Broom perform admirably but only finish in 9th out 10 teams, one place above fellow new boys Ardnamurchan Camanachd. 2007 saw an improvement in the young team, the club won the inaugural Cuach a' Chuain Sgith match played against Lewis Camanachd and overhauled their previous league points total for 2006.

The club retained the Cuach in 2008 as they looked for promotion from Division Three. The club did not achieve promotion but garnered its highest ever points total, 20, and finished in 5th position - its highest placing since reformation. They were also knocked out of the Strathdearn Cup by Skye Camanachd, the first time the two sides had faced each other at senior level.

In 2009, the team has gone from strength to strength starting with a Cuach win against Lewis and a strong winning streak at the start of the season which left them in pole position for the North Three championship for most of the season. They finished the season with 29 points but were overtaken by Beauly Reserves in the east coast club's final game. This second-place finish was still excellent progress by a club in its fifth season.

The club had a disappointing 2010 season finishing fourth but well off the title pace. Decline continued in 2011 with a fifth-place finish but 2012 saw Broom pushing at the top of the league but always unlikely to catch a rampant Beauly. Third place showed that Broom had recaptured some of the 2009 form. Broom fell away again in 2013 back to sixth spot.

2014 was a disappointing season for the Broom and finally, after several seasons, a lack of player availability meant the club went into abeyance at senior level for the 2015 season.
