= Royal National Mòd =

Annual Scottish Gaelic cultural festival in Scotland

The Royal National Mòd
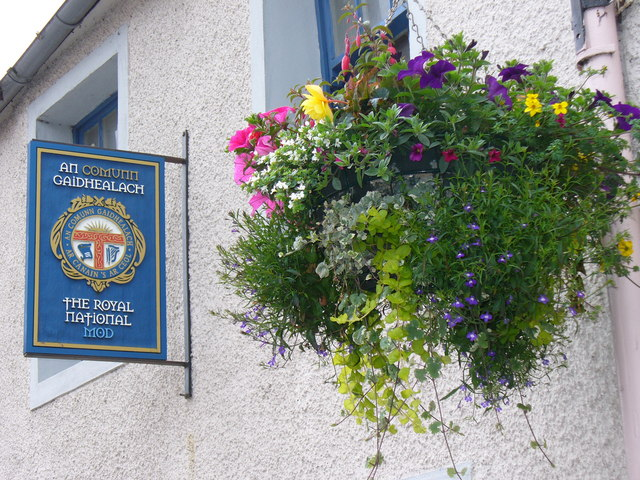
- Genre: Poetry, folk music, traditional music, choral music, spoken word, drama
- Dates: October
- Location: Scotland
- Years active: 1892 – present

The Royal National Mòd (Scottish Gaelic: Am Mòd Nàiseanta Rìoghail) is an Eisteddfod-inspired international Celtic festival focusing upon Scottish Gaelic literature, traditional music, and culture which is held annually in Scotland. It is the largest of several major Scottish Mòds and is often referred to simply as the Mòd.

The Mòd is run by An Comunn Gàidhealach (The Gaelic Association) and includes competitions and awards.

== History ==
The Mòd was founded by An Comunn Gàidhealach. St Columba's Church, Glasgow, also greatly influenced the Mòd's inception when, in 1891, its choir was invited to give a Gaelic Concert in Oban, presided over by Lord Archibald Campbell. The concert was attended by much of the Scottish nobility, including Louise, Princess Royal and Duchess of Fife. After the concert, the choir were entertained to supper at the Alexandra Hotel, and a description of the entertainment is given in one of William Black's novels. This concert was the prelude to the first Mòd, which was held at Oban the following year and St Columba Choir won the award in the Choral music competition. The poet, traditional singer, and Highland Land League activist Màiri Mhòr nan Òran (1821–1898), performed in the first Mòd's Gaelic song competition, but she was not awarded a medal.

The Mòd has been held most years in October since 1892. The only years in which the National Mòd was not held were during the First World War of 1914–1919, the Second World War 1939–1946, and the COVID-19 pandemic year of 2020. The "Royal" was not originally part of the name. It is still the practice of the St Columba's Church to send a concert party to start off the fund-raising when the Mòd visits Oban. As well as winning the premier choir competition for the first three years, the congregation has also had many Mòd gold medallists over the years.

The Mòd itself has been greatly influenced by the National Eisteddfod of Wales, although it tends to be somewhat more restrained in its ceremonial aspects.

According to Ronald Black, "In 1923, following the example of the Welsh Eisteddfod, An Commun Gàidhealach simplified the structure of its annual poetry competitions into a single contest for a Bardic Crown (Crùn na Bàrdachd), the winner to be acknowledged as Bard of An Commun (Bàird a' Chomuinn Ghàidhealaich) for the coming year. The man behind the move, not surprisingly, was Angus Robertson, then President of An Comunn. Offering a distinctive middle path between traditional and modern verse, the competition produced much work of note which deserves to be put into perspective... (Many subsidiary prizes remained; Sorley Maclean won a junior one in 1928, while in 1946 Derick Thomson won a gold medal as the most distinguished entrant in the literary competitions generally). The Bard was crowned each year at the closing concert of the Mòd. Astonishingly, unlike in Wales, the winning poem itself formed no part of the proceedings... In 1978 no award was made because no entry was of adequate quality. It was the second time in five years that this had happened, and in March 1979 An Comunn announced that the Bardic Crown would no longer be awarded."

A watershed moment took place during the 2011 Royal National Mòd at Stornoway, when the poetry of Lewis MacKinnon, composed in the Canadian Gaelic dialect spoken in Antigonish County, Nova Scotia, won the Bardic Crown. It was the first time in the history of the Mòd that such an award had been granted to a non-Scot.

== Competitions ==
The Mòd largely takes the form of formal competitions. Choral events and traditional music including Gaelic song, fiddle, bagpipe, clarsach and folk groups dominate. Spoken word events include children's and adults' poetry reading, storytelling and Bible reading, and categories such as Ancient Folk Tale or Humorous Monologue. Children can also present an original drama, and there are prose and poetry competitions in written Scottish Gaelic literature. The Mòd also runs an annual shinty competition, the Mòd Cup, between the two shinty teams closest to where the Mòd is taking place.

The winners of each day's competitions are invited to perform in the winners' cèilidhs held every evening.

The Mòd is a celebration of [Scottish] Gaelic language and culture, which raises its profile and contributes towards the aim of securing its future.

Improvements in and the recent mass expansion of Scottish Gaelic-medium education across Scotland has meant that beginning in 2007 the junior fluent speakers' section increased to such an extent that the organisers were forced to extend some Mòd competitions beyond one day.

Culturally, the Mòd is comparable to the Welsh Eisteddfod and the Irish Oireachtas na Gaeilge.

== The Mòd Fringe ==
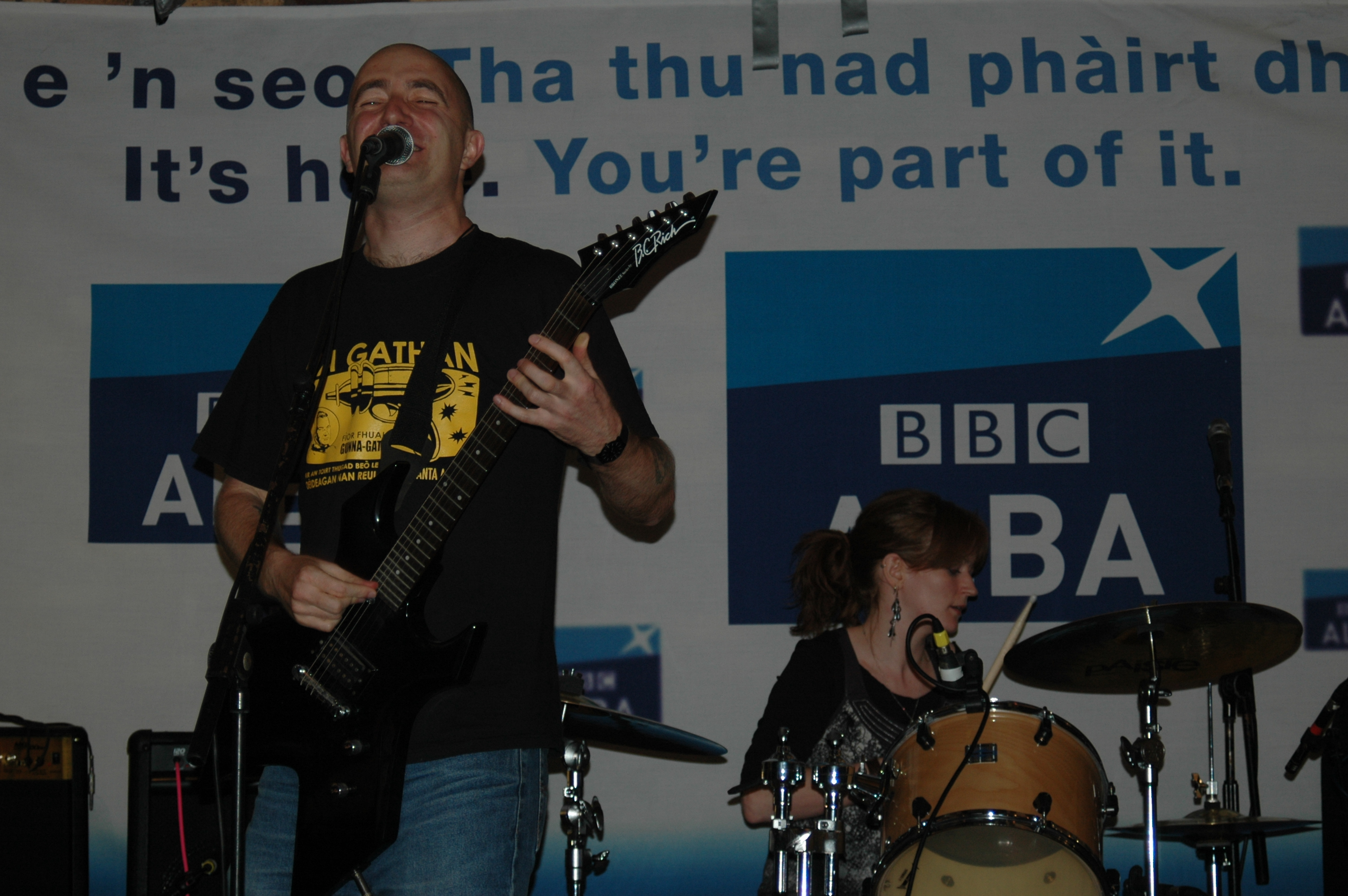
Na Gathan performing at the Mòd Fringe in Falkirk

The Mòd draws a large crowd, which leads local venues to put on various events in addition to the official Mòd events. These events are collectively referred to as the Mòd Fringe.

== Controversy ==
There has been some recent criticism of the "Gold Medal" event, which favours the style of Gaelic singing as adapted into the Victorian era art song tradition, which was popularized in the early 20th century by Marjory Kennedy-Fraser. Some 21st century Scottish traditional musicians now allege that the contest has long marginalised more traditional singers like the late Flora MacNeil and their styles. This is not a new criticism, however. In conversation with American ethnomusicologist Amy Murray, Fr. Allan MacDonald (1859–1905), an iconic poet in Scottish Gaelic literature, once said that the choral arrangements of Gaelic songs usually performed at the Mòd during its inception were based on "collections noted both on the staff and in Tonic Sol-Fa, with of course all the twists and turns cut out", and were "As though you were to fit a statue into a box by taking off the nose and ears."

More recently, Scottish traditional musician Fergus Munro has noted that as Scotland has grown increasingly secularised, as a critic of what he alleges is a growing tendency to exclude both Christian poetry and Gaelic psalm- and hymn-singing from the Mòd.

Furthermore, the Mòd is popularly known as the "Whisky Olympics", which is considered, "either a vicious slur or fair comment".

== Media coverage ==
BBC Scotland has traditionally broadcast Mòd highlights on BBC One, BBC Two and Radio nan Gàidheal. Since its introduction in 2008, BBC Alba has provided coverage in Gaelic. Presenters have included traditional musician, Gaelic speaker and broadcaster, Mary Ann Kennedy and Gaelic broadcaster Cathy MacDonald.

== Past and future festivals ==
The Mòd is held each October, and has been held in the following locations throughout Scotland, both Highland and Lowland.

These are the host locations to date:

- Aberdeen – 1946, 1955, 1964, 1976
- Airdrie – 1993
- Aviemore – 1969
- Ayr – 1973
- Blairgowrie – 1996
- Dingwall – 1905, 1931, 1991
- Dundee – 1902, 1913, 1937, 1959, 1974
- Dunoon – 1930, 1950, 1968, 1994, 2000, 2006, 2012, 2018
- East Kilbride – 1975
- Edinburgh – 1899, 1910, 1919, 1928, 1935, 1951, 1960, 1986
- Falkirk – 2008
- Fort William, Lochaber – 1922, 1927, 1932, 1981, 1985, 1999, 2007, 2017, 2025
- Glasgow – 1895, 1901, 1907, 1911, 1921, 1933, 1938, 1948, 1958, 1967, 1988, 1990, 2019, 2026
- Golspie – 1977, 1995
- Greenock – 1904, 1925
- Inverness – 1897, 1903, 1912, 1923, 1936, 1949, 1957, 1966, 1972, 1984, 1997, 2014, 2021
- Largs – 1956, 1965, 2002
- Motherwell – 1983
- Oban – 1892, 1893, 1894, 1898, 1906, 1920, 1926, 1934, 1953, 1962, 1970, 1978, 1992, 2003, 2009, 2015, 2024
- Paisley – 2013, 2023
- Perth – 1896, 1900, 1924, 1929, 1947, 1954, 1963, 1980, 2004, 2022
- Rothesay – 1908, 1952
- Skye – 1982, 1998
- Stirling – 1909, 1961, 1971, 1987
- Stornoway – 1979, 1989, 2001
- Thurso – 2010
- Western Isles – 2005, 2011, 2016

The locations for upcoming Mòds are:

- Western Isles – October 2027
- Oban – 2028

== See also ==
- National Eisteddfod of Wales
- Oireachtas na Gaeilge
- List of Celtic festivals
