= Culture of Scotland =

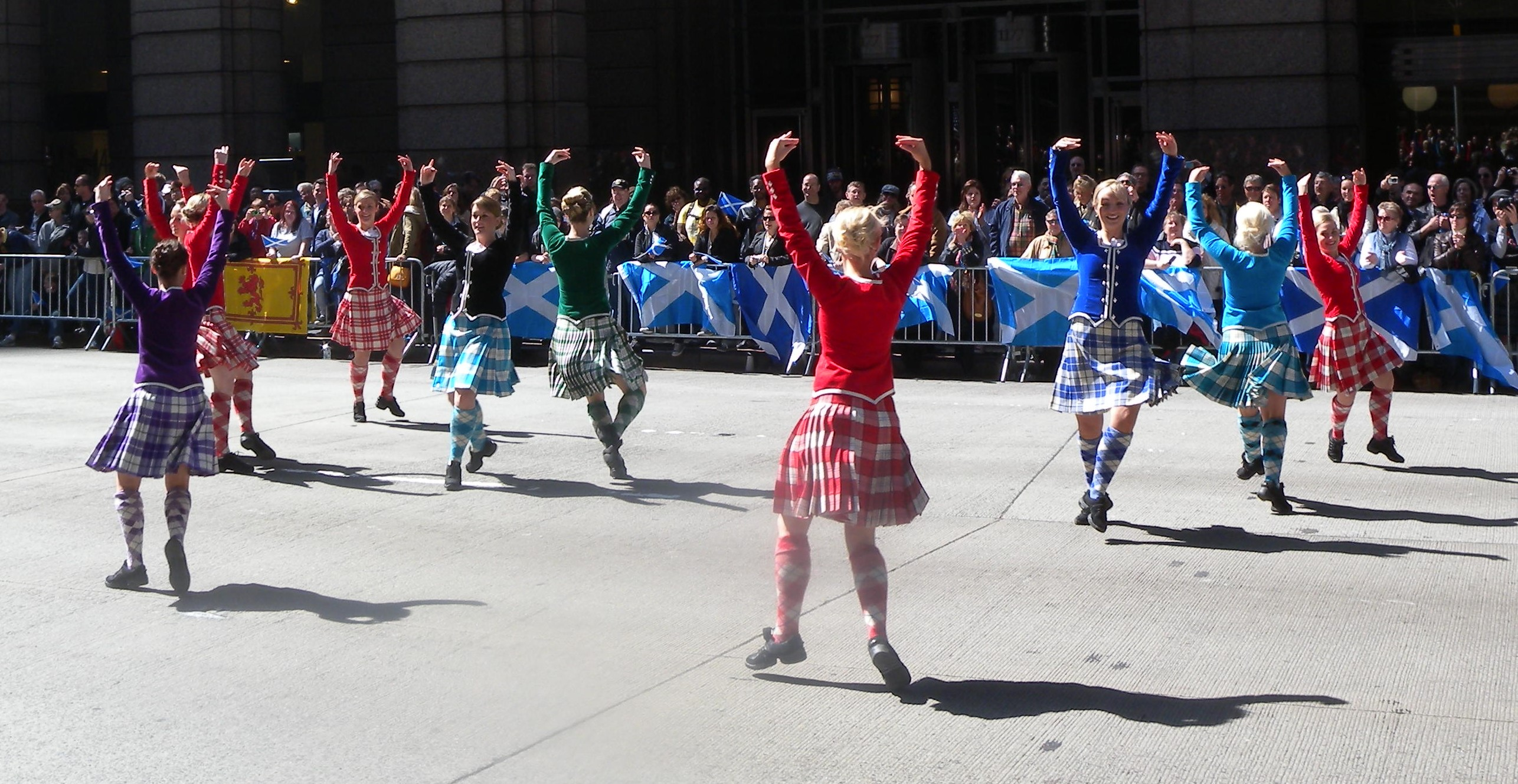
Highland dancing during Tartan Week, a celebration of Scottish culture and heritage

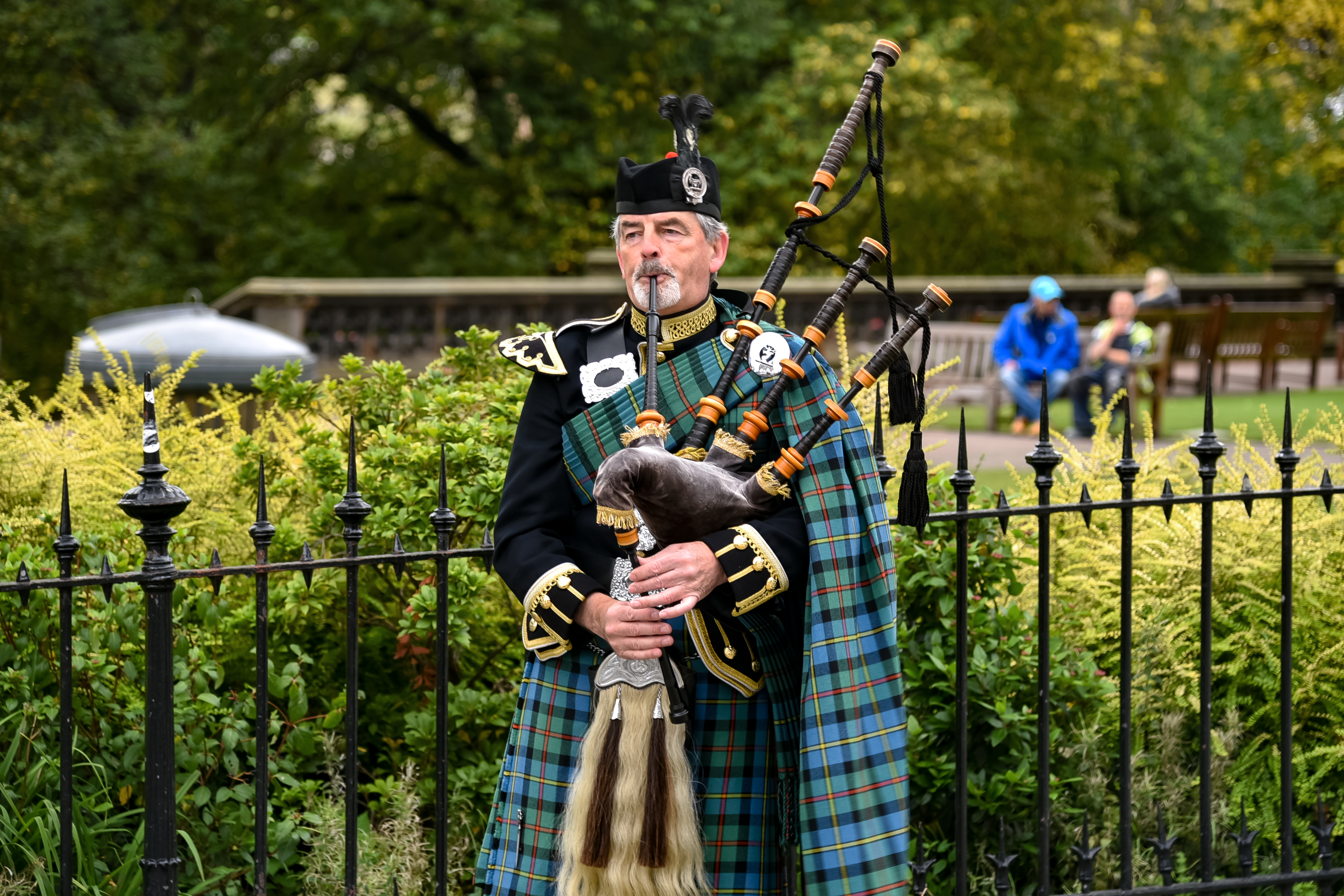
Bagpipes are an internationally recognised symbol of Scotland, its culture and music

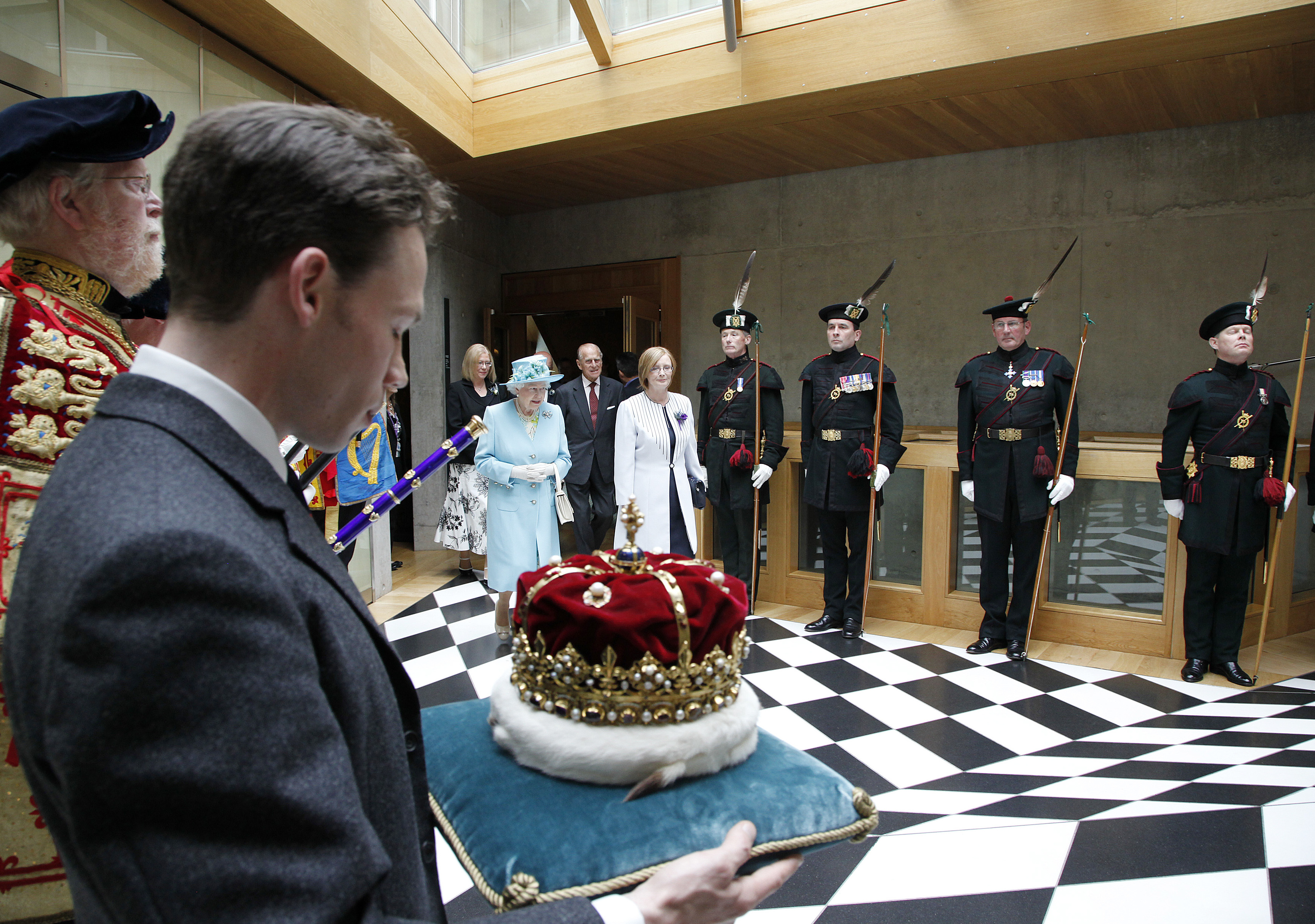
The Crown of Scotland at the state opening of a session of the Scottish Parliament. It is amongst the oldest set of crown jewels in Europe, and the oldest surviving crown in the British Isles

The culture of Scotland includes its distinct legal system, financial institutions, sports, literature, art, music, media, cuisine, philosophy, folklore, languages, and religious traditions. Since the introduction of Scottish devolution in 1999, modern Scottish culture is somewhat associated with the re–convened Scottish Parliament which has full control over creative and culture government policy across the country.

Scots law is separate from English law and remains an important part of Scotland’s identity, whilst the country has its own banking and currency systems including the Bank of Scotland which was the first bank in Europe to successfully print and distribute its own banknotes. Sports, like golf, rugby, football and shinty are widely played, with the country represented in international competitions by the national football team and national rugby team. Scotland also competes in the Commonwealth Games, one of only six countries to have competed in every games since its inception in 1930.

Scottish society has a significant literary tradition and contributions to art and music, with renowned poet Robert Burns considered the national poet of Scotland ("The Bard"). The media landscape includes Scottish-focused outlets. Traditional and modern Scottish cuisine are notable, such as Haggis, Shortbread, Scotch whisky and Irn-Bru. The country has made contributions to philosophy and has a strong tradition of folklore. Multiple languages and religious practices are present in Scottish society, including Scots, Scottish Gaelic and Scottish English, whilst the Church of Scotland retains its status as the national church.

== History ==
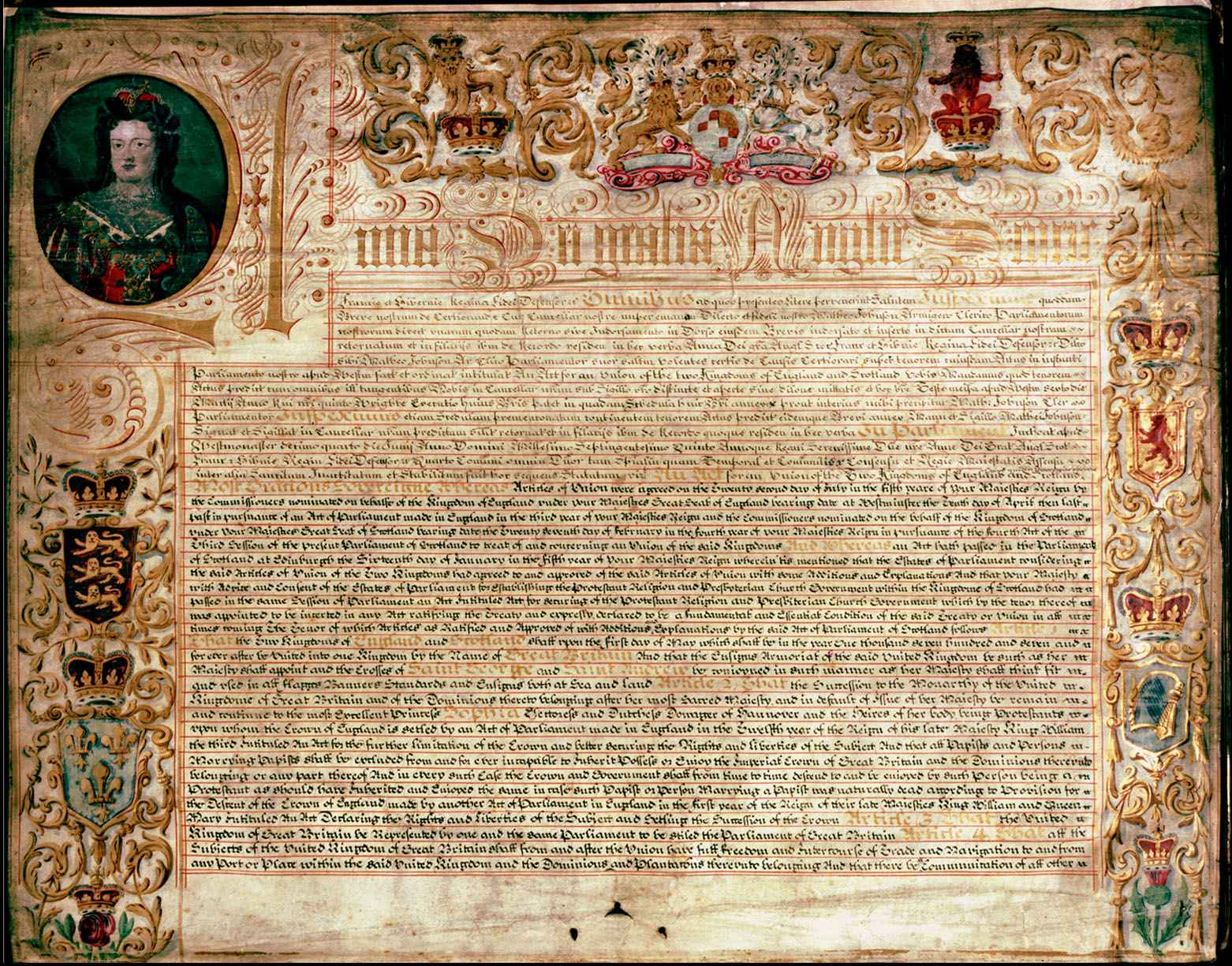
Scottish Exemplification (official copy) of the Treaty of Union of 1707, which united the Kingdom of Scotland with England to create the Kingdom of Great Britain

The earliest recorded history of Scotland begins with the arrival of the Roman Empire in the 1st century, when the province of Britannia reached as far north as the Antonine Wall. North of this was Caledonia, inhabited by the Picti, whose uprisings forced Rome's legions back to Hadrian's Wall. As Rome finally withdrew from Britain, a Gaelic tribe from Ireland called the Scoti began colonising Western Scotland and Wales. Before Roman times, prehistoric Scotland entered the Neolithic Era about 4000 BC, the Bronze Age about 2000 BC, and the Iron Age around 700 BC. The Gaelic kingdom of Dál Riata was founded on the west coast of Scotland in the 6th century. In the following century, Irish missionaries introduced the previously pagan Picts to Celtic Christianity. Following England's Gregorian mission, the Pictish king Nechtan chose to abolish most Celtic practices in favour of the Roman rite, restricting Gaelic influence on his kingdom and avoiding war with Anglian Northumbria. Towards the end of the 8th century, the Viking invasions began, forcing the Picts and Gaels to cease their historic hostility to each other and to unite in the 9th century, forming the Kingdom of Scotland.

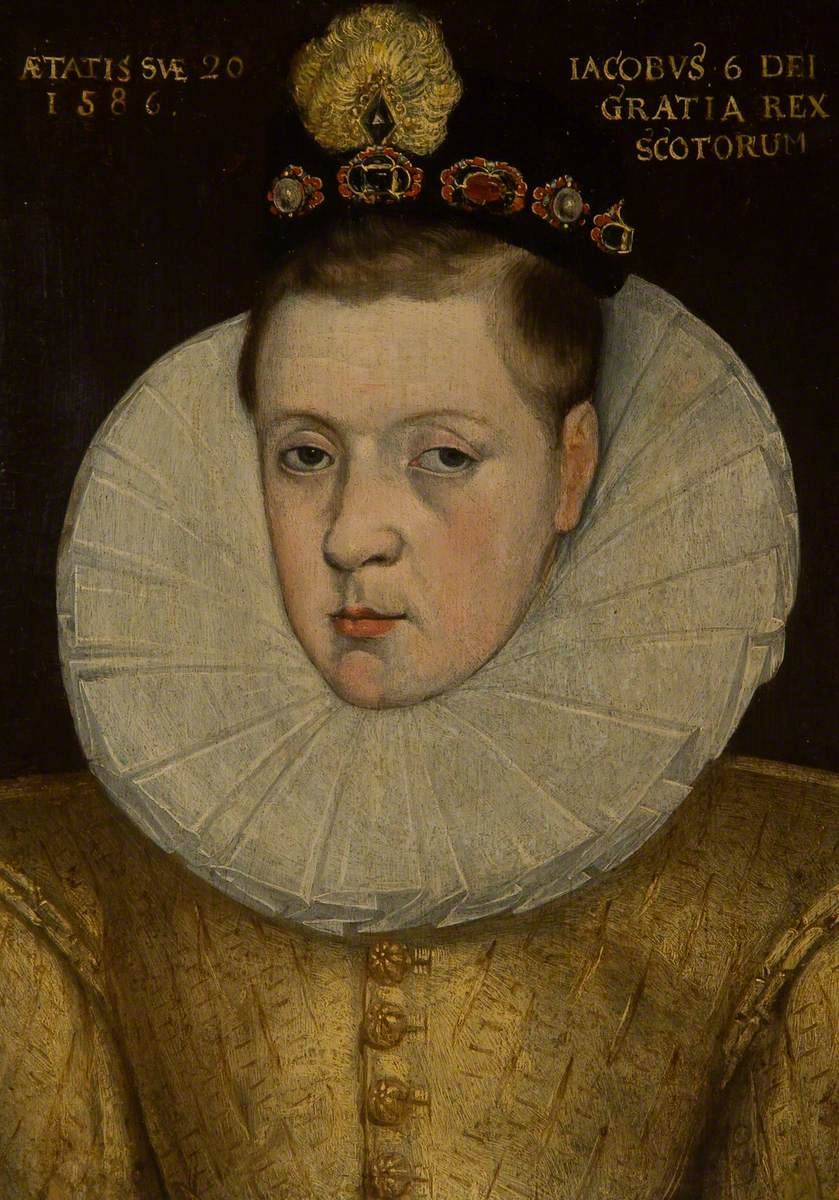
James VI of Scotland, the longest reigning Scottish monarch (1567–1625). The Monarchy of Scotland is amongst the oldest internationally, and the oldest recorded monarchy in Europe

The Kingdom of Scotland was united under the House of Alpin, whose members fought among each other during frequent disputed successions. The last Alpin king, Malcolm II, died without a male issue in the early 11th century and the kingdom passed through his daughter's son to the House of Dunkeld or Canmore. The last Dunkeld king, Alexander III, died in 1286. He left only his infant granddaughter, Margaret, as heir, who died herself four years later. England, under Edward I, would take advantage of this questioned succession to launch a series of conquests, resulting in the Wars of Scottish Independence, as Scotland passed back and forth between the House of Balliol and the House of Bruce through the late Middle Ages. Scotland's ultimate victory confirmed Scotland as a fully independent and sovereign kingdom. In 1707, the Kingdom of Scotland united with the Kingdom of England to create the new state of the Kingdom of Great Britain under the terms of the Treaty of Union. The Parliament of Scotland was subsumed into the newly created Parliament of Great Britain which was located in London, with 45 Members of Parliament (MPs) representing Scottish affairs in the newly created parliament.

In 1999, a Scottish Parliament was reconvened and a Scottish Government re–established under the terms of the Scotland Act 1998, with Donald Dewar leading the first Scottish Government since 1707, until his death in 2000. In 2007, the Scottish National Party (SNP) were elected to government following the 2007 election, with first minister Alex Salmond holding a referendum on Scotland regaining its independence from the United Kingdom. Held on 18 September 2014, 55% of the electorate voted to remain a country of the United Kingdom, with 45% voting for independence.

During the Scottish Enlightenment and Industrial Revolution, Scotland became one of the commercial, intellectual and industrial powerhouses of Europe. Later, its industrial decline following the Second World War was particularly acute. Today, 5,490,100 people live in Scotland, the majority of which are located in the central belt of the country in towns and cities such as Ayr, Edinburgh, Glasgow, Paisley and Kilmarnock, and cities such as Aberdeen, Dundee and Inverness to the north of the country. The economy has shifted from a heavy industry driven economy to be become one which is services and skills based, with Scottish Gross Domestic Product (GDP) estimated to be worth £218 billion in 2023, including offshore activity such as North Sea oil extraction.

== Scots law ==
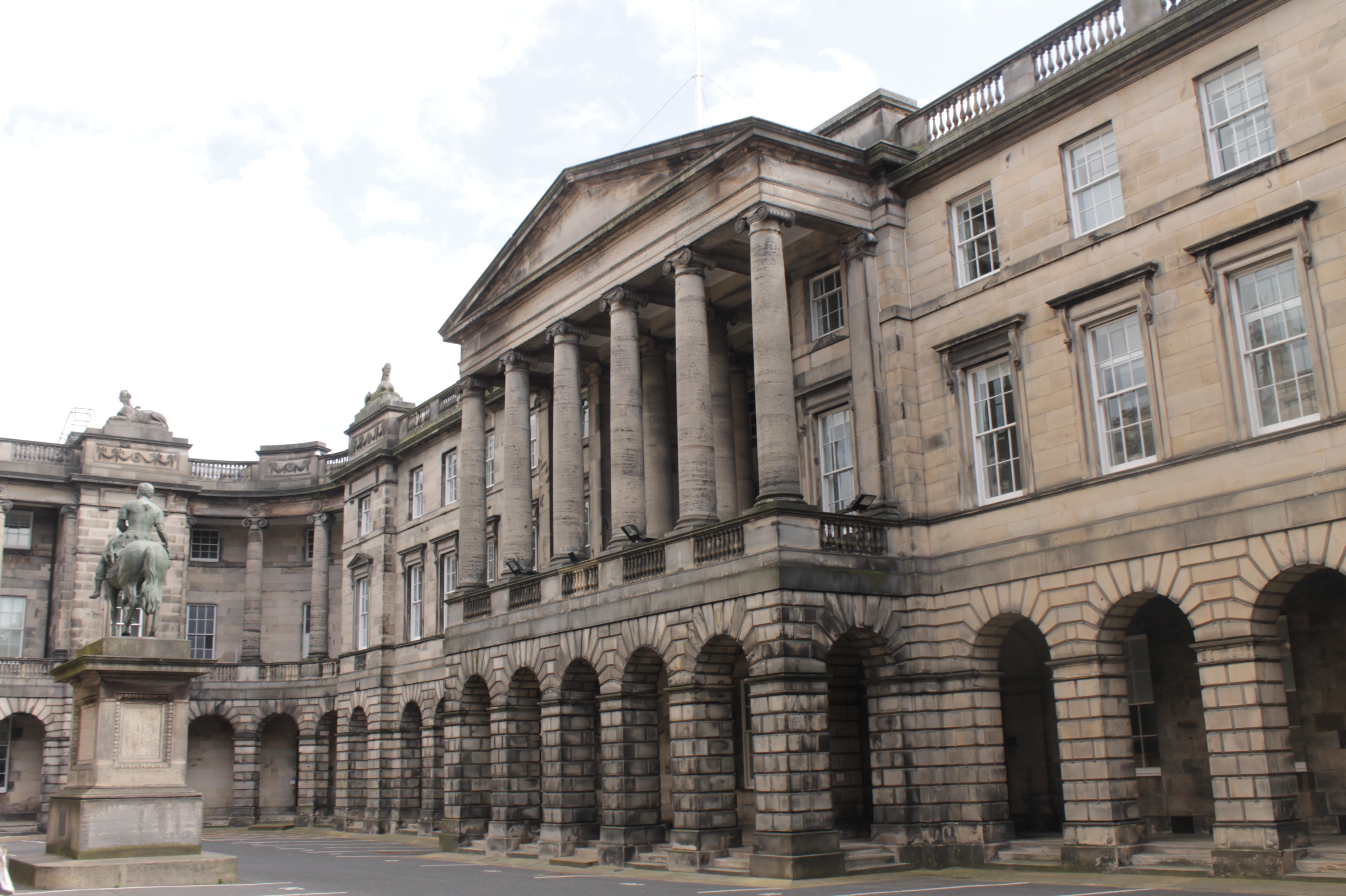
The Supreme Courts of Scotland located at Parliament House, Edinburgh

Scotland's legal system is known as Scots Law which is based on Roman law, and combines features of both civil law and common law. The terms of union with England specified the retention of separate systems. The barristers are called advocates, and the judges of the high court for civil cases are also the judges for the high court for criminal cases. The Scottish Government has executive responsibility for the Scottish legal system, with functions exercised by the Cabinet Secretary for Justice. The Justice Secretary has political responsibility for policing and law enforcement, the courts of Scotland, the Scottish Prison Service, fire services, civil emergencies and civil justice. The Law Officers of Scotland, the Lord Advocate and Solicitor General for Scotland, are the most senior law officers of the Scottish Government, with the Lord Advocate acting as the chief legal adviser to the Scottish Government, as well as ultimately being responsible for the functioning of Scots law with all prosecutions on indictment in Scotland being conducted in the name of the Lord Advocate.

Formerly, there were several regional law systems in Scotland, one of which was Udal Law (also called allodail or odal law) in Shetland and Orkney. This was a direct descendant of Old Norse Law, but was abolished in 1611. Despite this, Scottish courts have acknowledged the supremacy of udal law in some property cases as recently as the 1990s. Various systems based on common Celtic Law also survived in the Highlands until the 1800s.

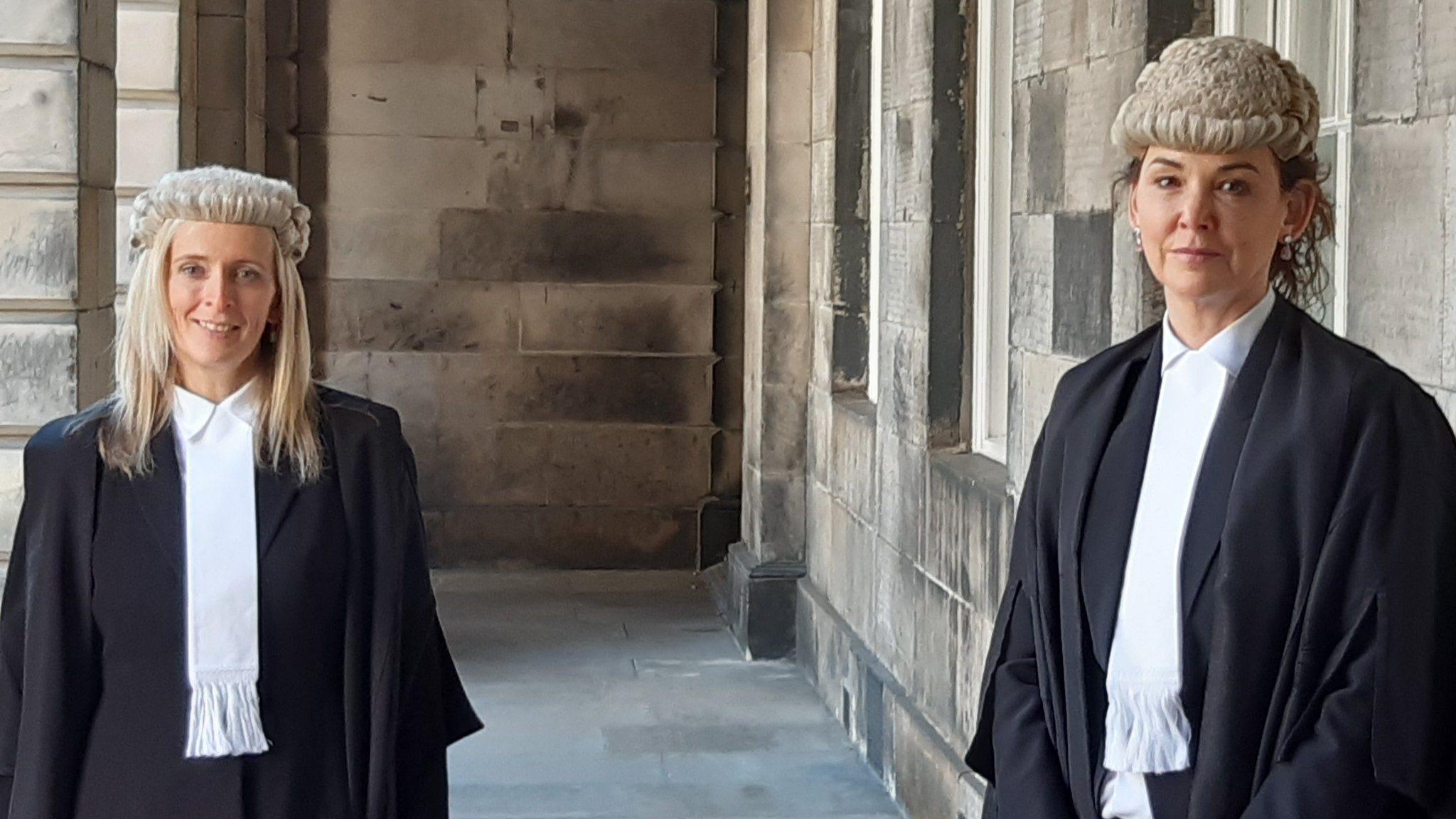
Current and former Lord Advocates Ruth Charteris KC and Dorothy Bain KC, respectively

Early Scots law before the 12th century consisted of the different legal traditions of the various cultural groups who inhabited the country at the time, the Gaels in most of the country, with the Britons and Anglo-Saxons in some districts south of the Forth and with the Norse in the islands and north of the River Oykel. The introduction of feudalism from the 12th century and the expansion of the Kingdom of Scotland established the modern roots of Scots law, which was gradually influenced by other, especially Anglo-Norman and continental legal traditions. Although there was some indirect Roman law influence on Scots law, the direct influence of Roman law was slight up until around the 15th century. After this time, Roman law was often adopted in argument in court, in an adapted form, where there was no native Scots rule to settle a dispute; and Roman law was in this way partially received into Scots law.

Upon joining the European Union, Scots law had been affected by European Union law under the Treaties of the European Union, the requirements of the European Convention on Human Rights (entered into by members of the Council of Europe) and the creation of the devolved Scottish Parliament which may pass legislation within all areas not reserved to Westminster, as detailed by the Scotland Act 1998. The UK Withdrawal from the European Union (Continuity) (Scotland) Act 2020 was passed by the Scottish Parliament in December 2020. It received royal assent on 29 January 2021 and came into operation on the same day. It provides powers for the Scottish Ministers to keep devolved Scots law in alignment with future EU law.

== Banking and currency ==
Banking in Scotland also features unique characteristics. Although the Bank of England remains the central bank for His Majesty's Government, three Scottish corporate banks still issue their own banknotes: the Bank of Scotland, the Royal Bank of Scotland and the Clydesdale Bank.

The Bank of Scotland was established by the Parliament of Scotland in 1695 to develop Scotland's trade with other countries, and aimed to create a stable banking system in the country. It was the first bank to be established in Scotland, and is the oldest operational bank in the country, the ninth oldest bank in continuous operation globally, as well as the longest continuous issuer of banknotes in the world. It is the only commercial institution created by the Parliament of Scotland, when Scotland was an independent, sovereign state, to remain in existence, and was the first bank in Europe to successfully print its own banknotes, and it continues to print its own sterling banknotes under legal arrangements that allow Scottish banks to issue currency.

== Sports ==
The Scotland national football team competes in sporting events such as the FIFA World Cup, UEFA European Championship and UEFA Nations League. Scotland does not compete in the Olympic Games independently however, and in athletics, Scotland has competed for the Celtic Cup, against teams from Wales and Ireland, since the inaugural event in 2006. The country does, however, compete separately in the Commonwealth Games, one of only six countries who have competed in every games since its inception in 1930. Scotland has hosted the Commonwealth Games on three occasions, twice in Edinburgh and once in Glasgow, with the upcoming 2026 Commonwealth Games set to be hosted once again in Glasgow.

The country also has its own national rugby team which competes in the Rugby World Cup and the Six Nations Championship annually. Scotland is the "Home of Golf", and is well known for its courses. As well as its world-famous Highland Games (athletic competitions), it is also the home of curling, and shinty, a stick game similar to Ireland's hurling.

Other national teams representing Scotland in sport including the national badminton team, the national netball team and the national volleyball team. Scotland has 3 professional ice hockey teams that compete in the Elite Ice Hockey League. Scottish cricket is a minority game, with the country represented by the national cricket team who have competed in the Cricket World Cup three times.

== Literature ==
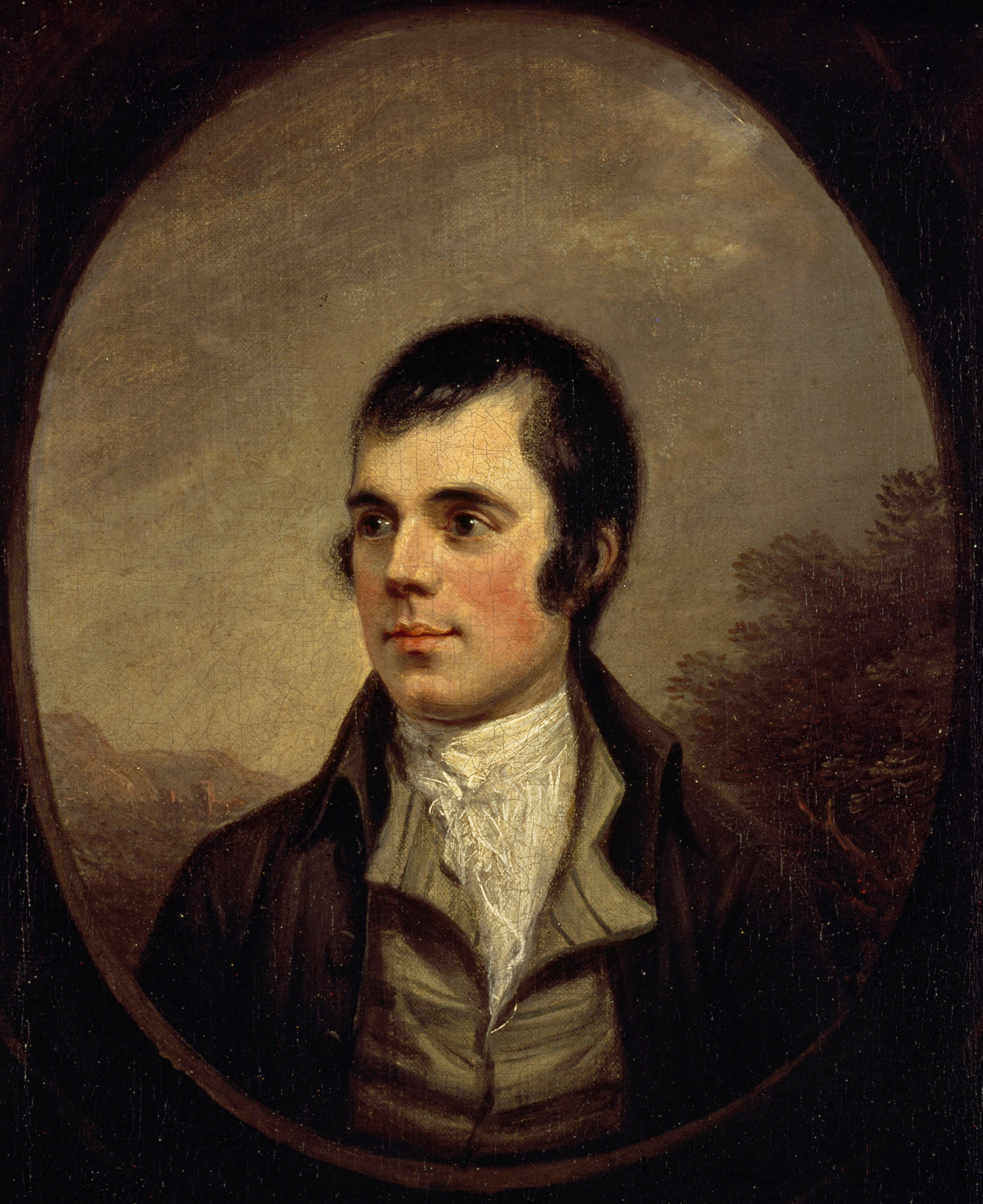
Robert Burns is considered the national poet of Scotland

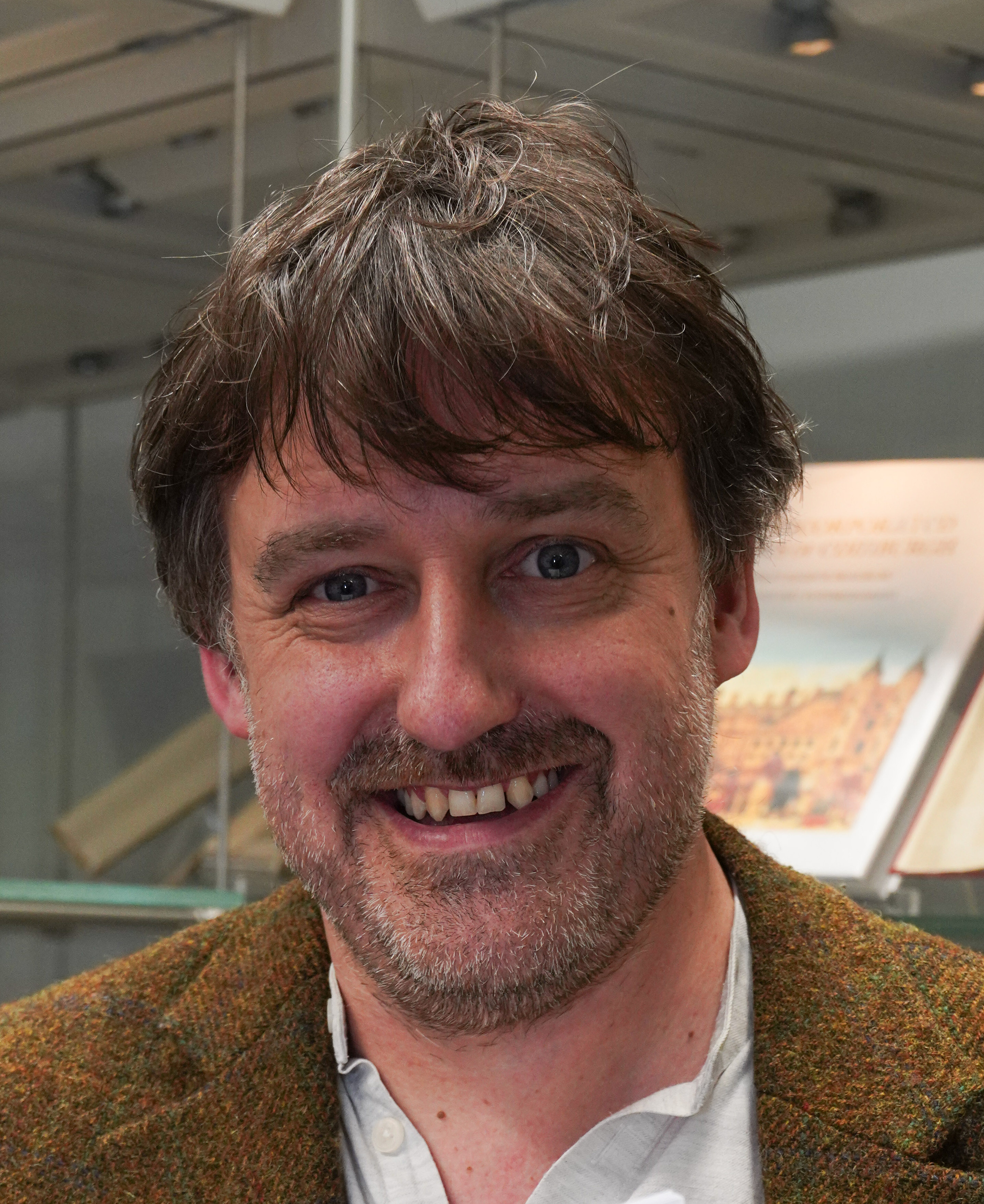
Pàdraig MacAoidh, the incumbent Makar (national poet for Scotland)

The earliest extant literature written in what is now Scotland, was composed in Brythonic speech in the sixth century and has survived as part of Welsh literature. In the following centuries there was literature in Latin, under the influence of the Catholic Church, and in Old English, brought by Anglian settlers. As the state of Alba developed into the Kingdom of Scotland from the eighth century, there was a flourishing literary elite who regularly produced texts in both Gaelic and Latin, sharing a common literary culture with Ireland and elsewhere. After the Davidian Revolution of the thirteenth century a flourishing French language culture predominated, while Norse literature was produced from areas of Scandinavian settlement. The first surviving major text in Early Scots literature is the fourteenth-century poet John Barbour's epic Brus, which was followed by a series of vernacular versions of medieval romances. These were joined in the fifteenth century by Scots prose works.

In the early modern era royal patronage supported poetry, prose and drama. James V's court saw works such as Sir David Lindsay of the Mount's The Thrie Estaitis. In the late-sixteenth century James VI became the patron and a member of a circle of Scottish court poets and musicians known as the Castalian Band. When he acceded to the English throne in 1603 many followed him to the new court, but without a centre of royal patronage the tradition of Scots poetry subsided. It was revived after union with England in 1707 by figures including Allan Ramsay, Robert Fergusson and James Macpherson. The latter's Ossian Cycle made him the first Scottish poet to gain an international reputation. He helped to inspire Robert Burns, considered by many to be the national poet, and Walter Scott, whose Waverley Novels did much to define Scottish identity in the 19th century. Towards the end of the Victorian era a number of Scottish-born authors achieved international reputations, including Robert Louis Stevenson, Arthur Conan Doyle, J. M. Barrie and George MacDonald.

In the 20th century there was a surge of activity in Scottish literature, known as the Scottish Renaissance. The leading figure, Hugh MacDiarmid, attempted to revive the Scots language as a medium for serious literature. Members of the movement were followed by a new generation of post-war poets including Edwin Morgan, who would be appointed the first Makar by the inaugural Scottish Government in 2004. From the 1980s Scottish literature enjoyed another major revival, particularly associated with writers including James Kelman and Irvine Welsh. Scottish poets who emerged in the same period included Carol Ann Duffy, who in May 2009 was named the first Scot to be the British Poet Laureate.

== Art ==
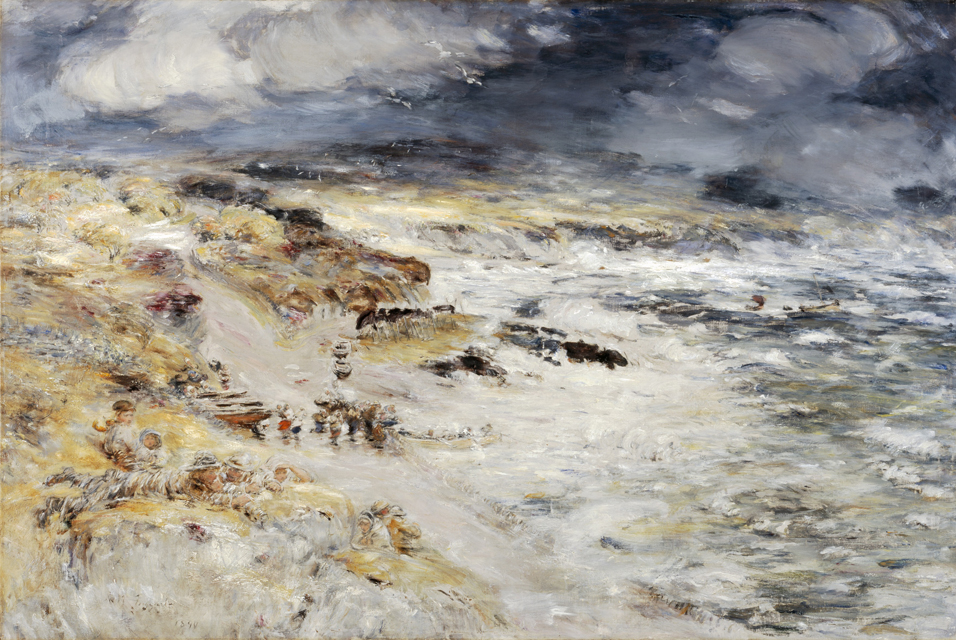
William McTaggart, The Storm (1890)

The earliest examples of art from what is now Scotland are highly decorated carved stone balls from the Neolithic period. From the Bronze Age there are examples of carvings, including the first representations of objects, and cup and ring marks. From the Iron Age there are more extensive examples of patterned objects and gold work. From the early Middle Ages there are elaborately carved Pictish stones and impressive metalwork. The development of a common style of Insular art across Great Britain and Ireland influenced elaborate jewellery and illuminated manuscripts like the Book of Kells. Only isolated examples survive of native artwork from the late Middle Ages and of works created or strongly influenced by artists of Flemish origin. The influence of the Renaissance can be seen in stone carving and painting from the fifteenth century. In the sixteenth century the crown began to employ Flemish court painters who have left a portrait record of royalty. The Reformation removed a major source of patronage for art, limited the level of public display, but may have helped in the growth of secular domestic forms, particularly elaborate painting of roofs and walls. In the seventeenth century there were the first significant native artists for whom names are extant, with figures like George Jamesone and John Michael Wright, but the loss of the court as a result of the Union of Crowns in 1603 removed another major source of patronage.

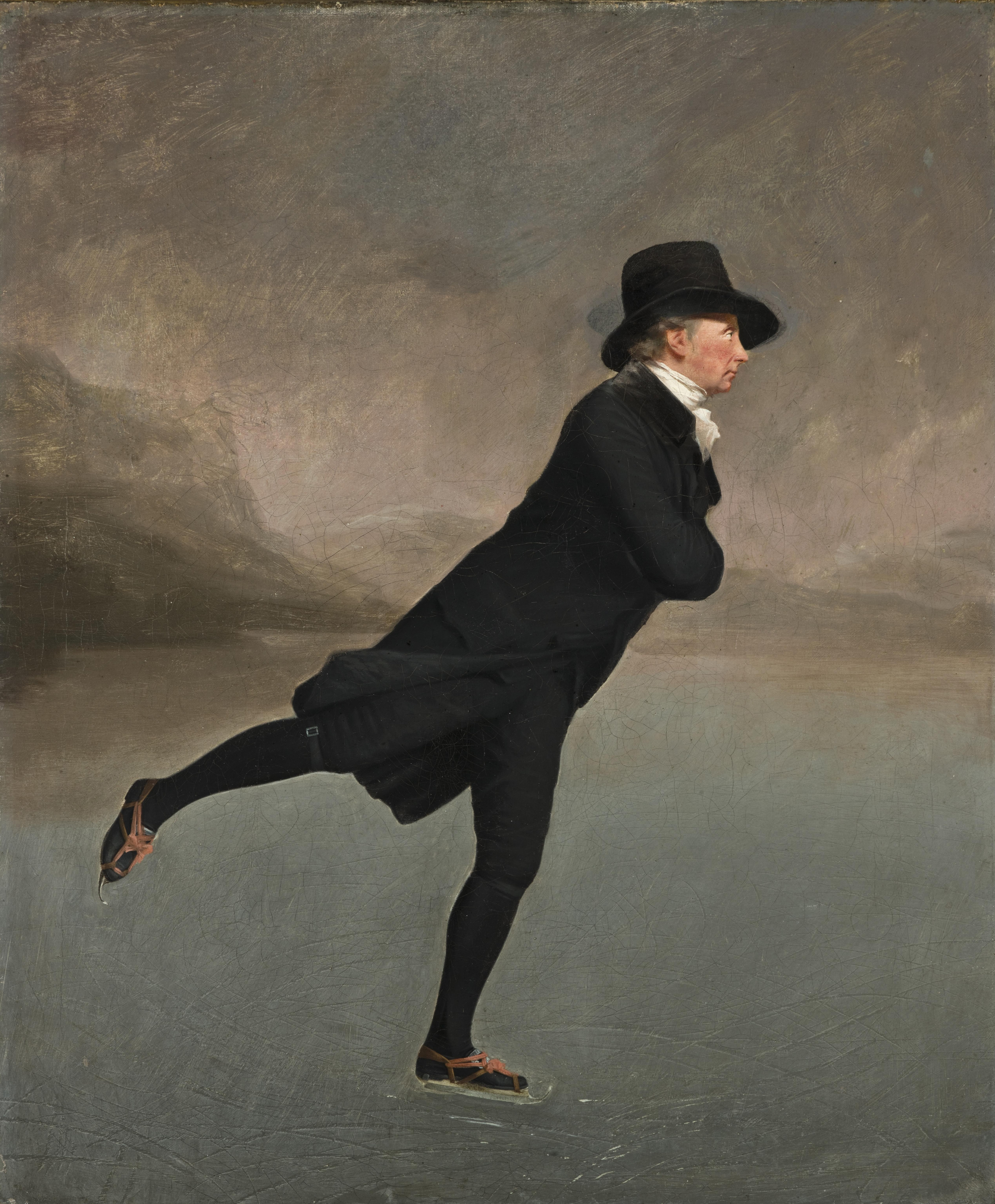
Henry Raeburn's Skating Minister inspired the design of the Scottish Parliament Building, and is displayed at the Scottish National Gallery

In the eighteenth century Scotland began to produce artists that were significant internationally, all influenced by neoclassicism, such as Allan Ramsay, Gavin Hamilton, the brothers John and Alexander Runciman, Jacob More and David Allan. Towards the end of the century Romanticism began to affect artistic production, and can be seen in the portraits of artists such as Henry Raeburn. It also contributed to a tradition of Scottish landscape painting that focused on the Highlands, formulated by figures including Alexander Nasmyth. The Royal Scottish Academy of Art was created in 1826, and major portrait painters of this period included Andrew Geddes and David Wilkie. William Dyce emerged as one of the most significant figures in art education in the United Kingdom.

The beginnings of a Celtic Revival can be seen in the late nineteenth century and the art scene was dominated by the work of the Glasgow Boys and the Four, led by Charles Rennie Mackintosh, who gained an international reputation for their combination of Celtic revival, Art and Crafts and Art Nouveau. The early twentieth century was dominated by the Scottish Colourists and the Edinburgh School. They have been described as the first Scottish modern artists and were the major mechanism by which post-impressionism reached Scotland. There was a growing interest in forms of Modernism, with William Johnstone helping to develop the concept of a Scottish Renaissance. In the post-war period, major artists, including John Bellany and Alexander Moffat, pursued a strand of "Scottish realism". Moffat's influence can be seen in the work of the "new Glasgow Boys" from the late twentieth century. In the twenty-first century Scotland has continued to produce successful and influential such as Douglas Gordon, David Mach, Susan Philipsz and Richard Wright.

Scotland possess significant collections of art, such as the National Gallery of Scotland and National Museum of Scotland in Edinburgh and the Burrell Collection and Kelvingrove Art Gallery and Museum in Glasgow. Significant schools of art include the Edinburgh College of Art and the Glasgow School of Art. The major funding body with responsibility for the arts in Scotland is Creative Scotland. Support is also given by local councils and independent foundations.

== Music ==
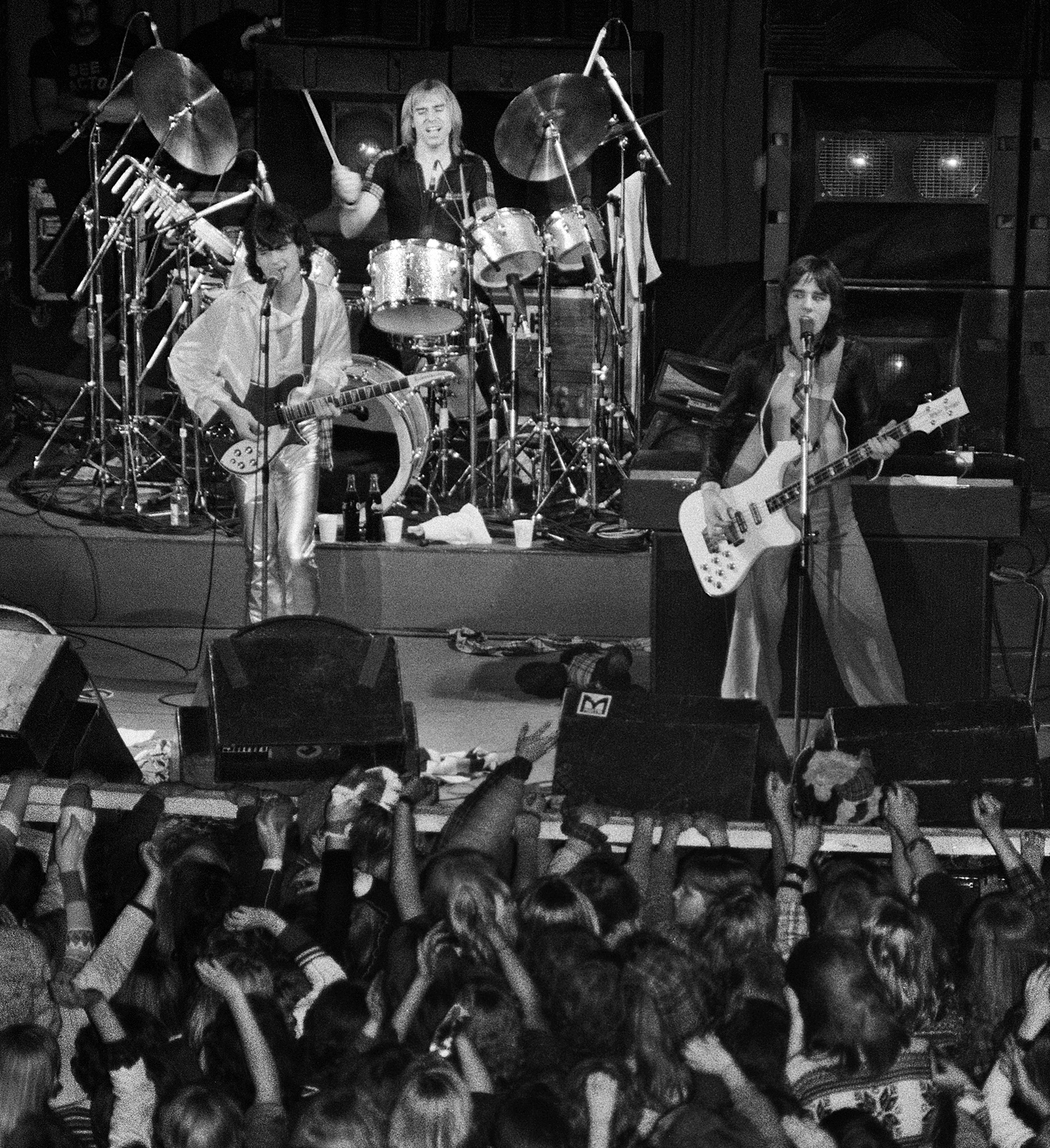
Bay City Rollers originated in Edinburgh and achieved international dominance in the 1970s

Scotland has developed an international reputation largely for its traditional music, which remained vibrant throughout the 20th century and into the 21st, when many traditional forms worldwide lost popularity to pop music. Traditional forms of Scottish music incorporate instruments including the bagpipes, which are considered to be an integral element of Scottish culture. Bagpipes are considered to have been introduced in the country in the 14th century, and by the 15th century, their popularity as an instrument in Scotland had increased. In spite of emigration and a well-developed connection to music imported from the rest of Europe and the United States, the music of Scotland has kept many of its traditional aspects; indeed, it has itself influenced many forms of music.

Scottish music and wider culture is annually celebrated at the Royal Edinburgh Military Tattoo and the wider Edinburgh Fringe Festival. Modern and contemporary Scottish music is celebrated at annual ceremonies such as the Scottish Music Awards, Scottish Album of the Year Award and Scottish Alternative Music Awards. The Scots Trad Music Awards were established in 2003, and celebrates Scotland's traditional music. Scotland produced notable musicians in the mid–20th century, including Jack Bruce who found fame as the bassist and lead vocalist for the band Cream. In the 1970s, Scottish music expanded internationally, notably with the Bay City Rollers who became one of many 1970s acts heralded as the "biggest group since the Beatles", they were called the "tartan teen sensations from Edinburgh", and sold between an estimated 120–300 million records worldwide, making them one of the best selling musical acts of all time globally. During the 1980s, Scottish acts such as Simple Minds, The Blue Nile and Primal Scream experienced international success.

Contemporary and modern music from Scotland continued throughout the 1990s with acts such as Travis, Texas, Shirley Manson and Aztec Camera. Artists such as Amy Macdonald, Sandi Thom, Franz Ferdinand, Paolo Nutini and KT Tunstall found considerable success in the 2000s, with Tunstall often incorporating elements of folk and pop music together. In 2009, Susan Boyle's debut album, I Dreamed a Dream, became the best selling album internationally, whilst throughout the 2010s, DJ and producer Calvin Harris achieved global chart prominence with a string of successive releases.

== Media ==
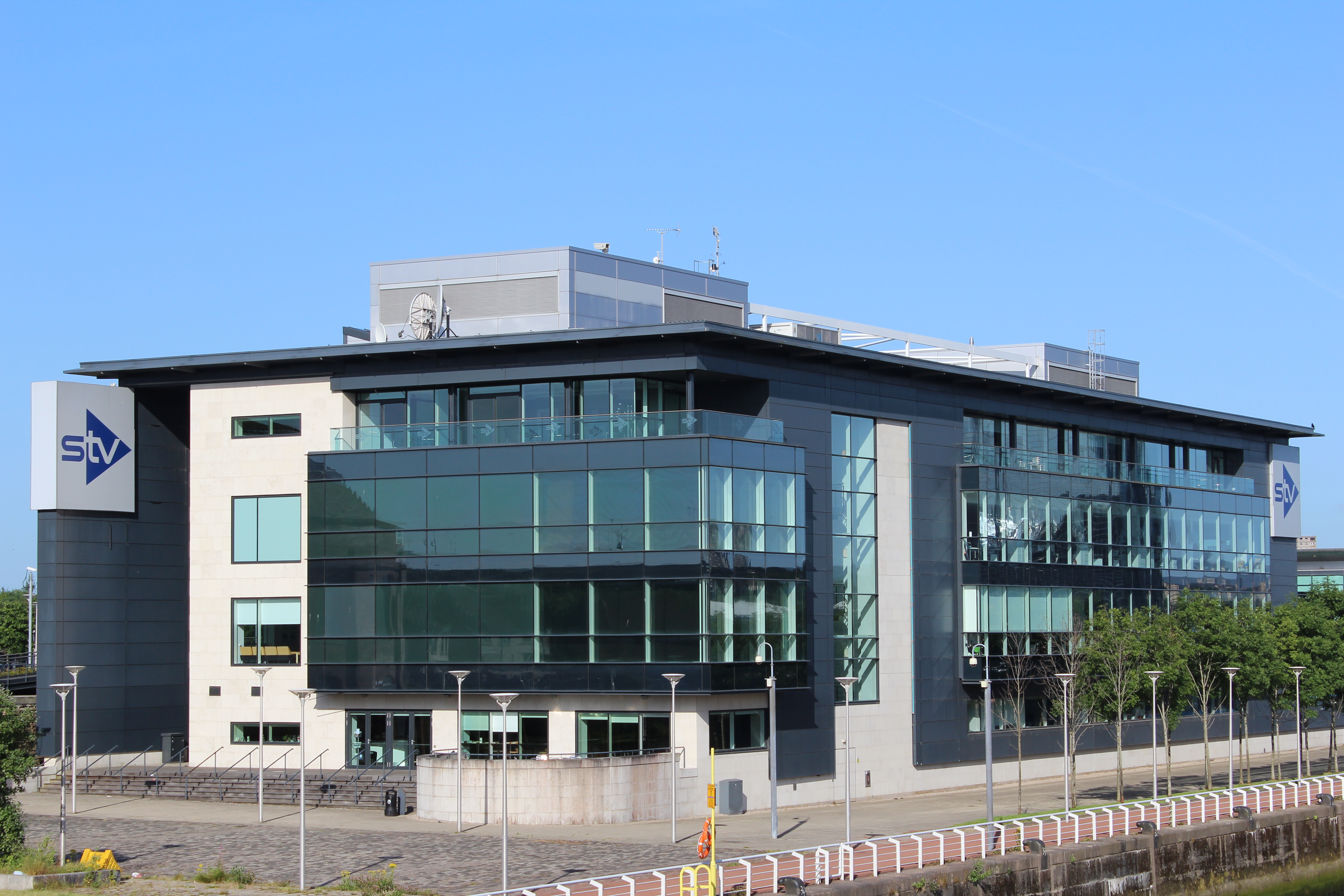
Studios of STV, a media group located in Glasgow

Scotland has several national newspapers, such as the Daily Record (Scotland's leading tabloid), the broadsheet The Herald, based in Glasgow, and The Scotsman in Edinburgh. Sunday newspapers include the tabloid Sunday Mail (published by Daily Record parent company Trinity Mirror) and the Sunday Post, while the Sunday Herald and Scotland on Sunday have associations with The Herald and The Scotsman respectively. Regional dailies include The Courier and Advertiser in Dundee and the east, and The Press and Journal serving Aberdeen and the north.

Scotland has its own BBC services which include the national radio stations, BBC Radio Scotland and the Scottish Gaelic language service BBC Radio nan Gaidheal. There are also a number of BBC and independent local radio stations throughout the country. In addition to radio, BBC Scotland also runs three national television stations: the Scottish variant of BBC One, the BBC Scotland channel and Gaelic-language TV channel BBC Alba. Much of the output of BBC Scotland Television, such as news and current affairs programmes, and the Glasgow-based soap opera, River City, are intended for broadcast within Scotland, while others, such as drama and comedy programmes, aim at audiences throughout the UK and further afield.

Two ITV stations, STV and ITV, also broadcast in Scotland. Most of the independent television output is the same as that transmitted in England, Wales and Northern Ireland, with the exception of news and current affairs, sport, comedy, cultural and Scottish Gaelic-language programming. As one of the Celtic nations, Scotland is represented at the Celtic Media Festival (formerly known as the Celtic International Film Festival). Scottish entrants have won many awards since the festival began in 1980. Scottish sponsors and partners of the event include Highlands and Islands Enterprise, BBC Scotland, MG Alba, Scottish Screen, STV and Bòrd na Gàidhlig.

== Food and drink ==
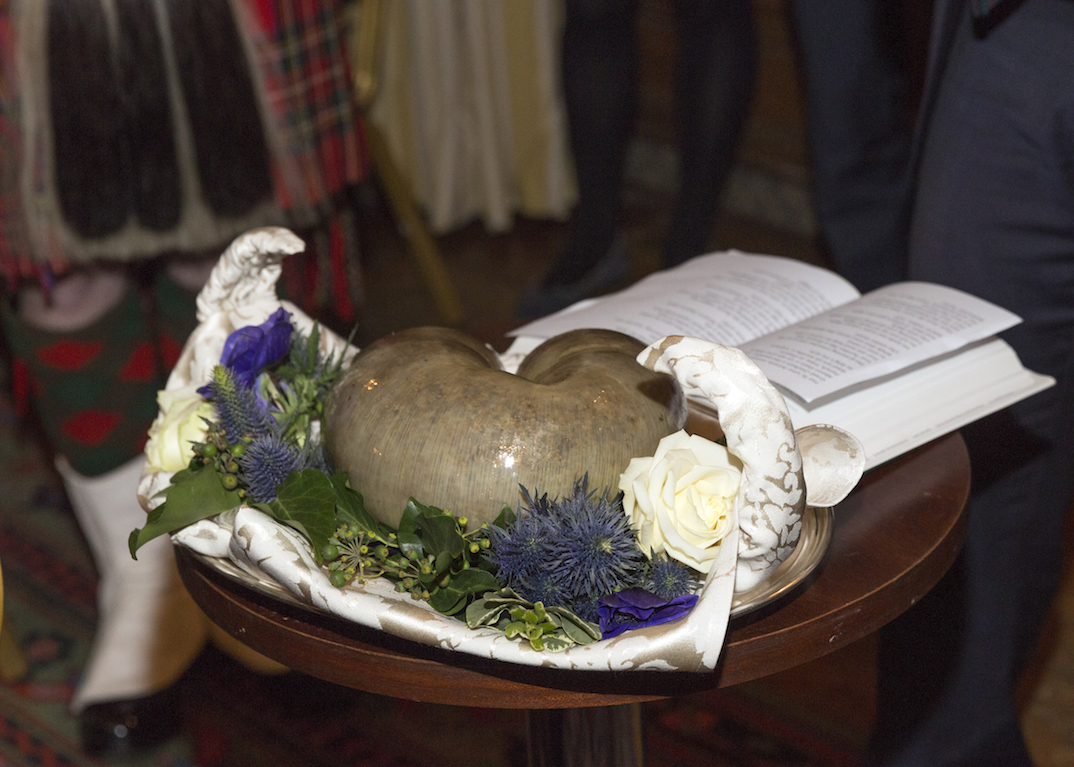
Haggis, an example of Scottish cuisine

Scottish cuisine offers traditional dishes such as fish and chips, haggis, the Arbroath smokie, salmon, venison, cranachan, the bannock, stovies, Scotch broth, tattie scone and shortbread. Scotland is also known for its Scotch whisky distilleries, as well as for Scottish beer. The soft drink Irn-Bru is cited by its manufacturer, A.G. Barr, as Scotland's 'other' national drink owing to its large market share in Scotland, outselling major international brands such as Coca-Cola.

== Philosophy ==
Scotland has a strong philosophical tradition. Duns Scotus was one of the premier medieval scholastics. In the Scottish Enlightenment Edinburgh was home to much intellectual talent, including Francis Hutcheson, David Hume and Adam Smith. Other cities also produced major thinkers at that time, such as Aberdeen through Thomas Reid.

== Folklore ==
Halloween, on the night of 31 October, is a traditional and much celebrated holiday in Scotland. The name Halloween was first attested in the 16th century as a Scottish shortening of All-Hallows-Eve, and according to some historians it has its roots in the Gaelic festival of Samhain, when the Gaels believed the border between this world and the otherworld became thin, and the dead would revisit the mortal world. In 1780 the poet John Mayne noted Halloween pranks: "What fearfu' pranks ensue!", as well as the supernatural associations of that night, "Bogies" (ghosts). The bard of Scotland Robert Burns' 1785 poem Halloween is recited by Scots at Halloween, and Burns was influenced by Mayne's composition. In Scotland, traditional Halloween customs include: Guising — children in costume going from door to door demanding food or coins — which became established practice by the late-19th century, turnips hollowed out and carved with faces to make lanterns, and parties with games such as apple bobbing. Further contemporary imagery of Halloween is derived from Gothic and horror literature (notably Mary Shelley's Frankenstein and Bram Stoker's Dracula), and classic horror films (such as Hammer Horrors). Mass transatlantic Irish and Scottish immigration in the 19th century popularized Halloween in North America.

== Language and religion ==
Scotland also has its own unique family of languages and dialects, helping to foster a strong sense of "Scottish-ness". See Scots language and Scottish Gaelic language. An organisation called Iomairt Cholm Cille (Columba Project) has been set up to support Gaelic-speaking communities in both Scotland and Ireland and to promote links between them.

Forms of Christianity have dominated religious life in what is now the Scotland for more than 1,400 years. Scotland retains its own national church, separate from the Church of England. See Church of Scotland and Religion in the United Kingdom. There is also a large minority of Roman Catholics, around 16 per cent of the population.

The patron saint of Scotland is Saint Andrew, and Saint Andrew's Day is celebrated in Scotland on 30 November. Saint (Queen) Margaret, Saint Columba and Saint Ninian have also historically enjoyed great popularity.

== Interceltic festivals ==
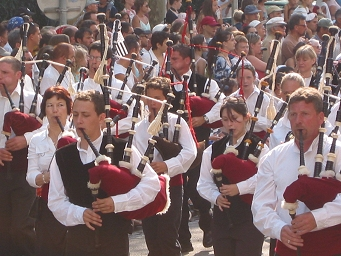
Pipers at the Festival Interceltique de Lorient.

As one of the Celtic nations, Scotland is represented at interceltic events at home and around the world. Scotland is host to two interceltic music festivals – the Scottish Arts Council funded Celtic Connections, Glasgow, and the Hebridean Celtic Festival, Stornoway – that were founded in the mid-1990s.

Scottish culture is also represented at interceltic festivals of music and culture worldwide. Among the most well known are Festival Interceltique de Lorient – held annually in Brittany since 1971 – the Pan Celtic Festival, Ireland, and the National Celtic Festival in Portarlington, Australia.

== National symbols ==
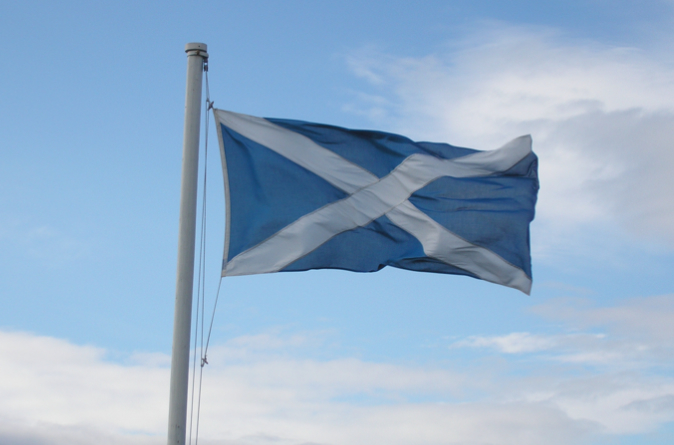
The Saltire, the national flag of Scotland, is regarded as the oldest flag in Europe

Scotland has a wide variety of national symbols that have come to be emblematic, representative, or otherwise characteristic of the country of and Scottish culture. The most notable and historic national symbols of the country include the Royal Banner of Scotland, the Great Seal of Scotland and the Thistle, the country's official floral emblem. The Honours of Scotland, containing the Crown of Scotland, Sceptre and Scottish Sword of State are displayed in the Crown Room at Edinburgh Castle, with the Crown of Scotland being present at the state opening of each new session of the Scottish Parliament. Other traditional national symbols include the Declaration of Arbroath, Scotland's deceleration of independence, the Stone of Scone, which is used in the coronation of the monarch, and Tartan, often considered an internationally recognisable symbol of Scotland and Scottish culture.

As one of the oldest countries in Europe, Scotland and its associated symbols are considered to be amongst the oldest symbols still in use across the European continent. The national flag, the Saltire, is first recorded with the illustration of a heraldic flag in Sir David Lyndsay of the Mount's Register of Scottish Arms, c. 1542. It is considered to be the oldest flag in Europe. Additionally, Scotland is the fifth oldest country in the world, and its monarchy is amongst the oldest internationally, and the oldest recorded monarchy in Europe.

== See also ==
- Architecture of Scotland
- A Drunk Man Looks at the Thistle
- Bard's blessing
- Homecoming Scotland 2009
- Scots language
- Scottish cringe
- Scottish Gaelic language
- Scottish mythology
- Scottish national identity
- Scottish people
- Scottish society
- Tartanry and List of tartans
