= Sabhal Mòr Lectures =

The Sabhal Mòr Lectures are a series of annual televised lectures held at the college Sabhal Mòr Ostaig on Skye, Scotland. The lectures are held in English, but focus on topics related to the Scottish Gaelic language, often with emphasis on related economic or cultural issues. The invited lecturers are sometimes very prominent personalities, and a number of the lectures have been seen as landmarks in the development of Scottish Gaelic policy. The lectures are sponsored and broadcast by STV (formerly Scottish Television and Grampian Television). Notable speakers over the years have included Mary Robinson, Gordon Brown, Donald Dewar and Jack McConnell.

== List of Sabhal Mòr lecturers ==
1. (1990) James Hunter (Historian, Director of the Scottish Crofters Union)
2. (1991) Gus Macdonald (Industrialist)
3. (1992) John Goodlad, Secretary of Shetland Fisherman's Association
4. (1993) Dr Una MacLean,
5. (1994) Dr John Purser, Writer, Composer and Musicologist
6. (1995) Alistair Moffat (CEO of Scottish Television Enterprises)
7. (1996) Donnie Munro (SMO development officer and former Runrig singer)
8. (1997) Mary Robinson (President of Ireland)
9. (1998) Calum MacDonald (Minister with responsibility for Gaelic affairs)
10. (1999) Gordon Brown (Chancellor of the Exchequer)
11. (2000) Donald Dewar (First Minister of Scotland)
12. (2001) Rhoda MacDonald (Head of Gaelic at Scottish Television)
13. (2002) Mícheál Ó Súilleabháin
14. (2003)
15. (2004) Jack McConnell (First Minister of Scotland )
16. (2005) Duncan Rice (Principal and Vice-Chancellor of Aberdeen University)
17. (2006)
18. (2007) Alex Salmond (First Minister of Scotland)
19. (2012) Ken MacQuarrie

== Significant lectures ==
A number of Sabhal Mòr Lectures have marked significant turning points in Scottish Gaelic language issues or caught the spirit of the day in striking ways which met with resonance in the Scottish Gaelic-speaking community.

Mary Robinson's lecture spoke of the possibility of creating an island space for the Hebrides and Ireland in which to celebrate what the two countries share. This led directly to the establishment of Columba Initiative.

In his 1999 lecture, Gordon Brown famously declared: What a bland and uniform place this Britain of ours would be if Britishness meant we all spoke the same way, sang, danced and celebrated the same way.

== See also ==
- Sàr Ghaidheal Fellowships
