= Scottish Gaelic Awards =

Award ceremony

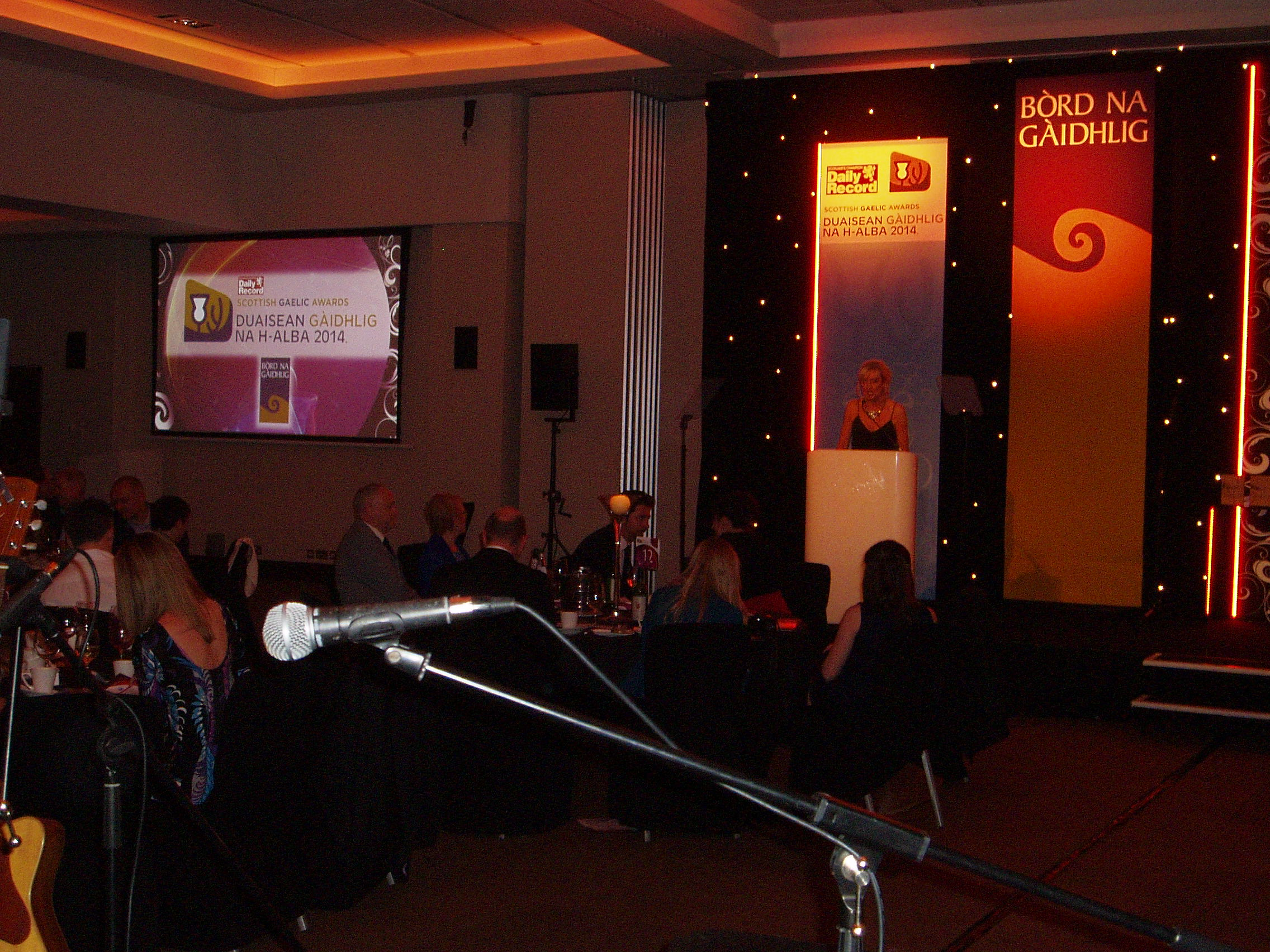
Cathy MacDonald presenting the 2014 Scottish Gaelic Awards

The Scottish Gaelic Awards (Scottish Gaelic: Duaisean Gàidhlig na h-Alba [ˈt̪uəʃən ˈkaːlɪkʲ nə ˈhal̪ˠapə] to people who have made significant contributions to the Gaelic language. They are organised by Bòrd na Gàidhlig in partnership with Media Scotland (primarily the Daily Record) and also sponsored by Education Scotland and Highlands and Islands Enterprise with support from the Western Isles Council.

== Award winners ==
=== 2016 ===
Awarded to	Category
Seumas Watson	Best Contribution Award
Anna NicSuain	Lifetime Achievement Award
Museum nan Eilean	Gaelic as an Economic Asset
Shannon Cowie	Young Gaelic Ambassador of the Year
Theatre gu Leòr	Arts and Culture Award
B’ eòlach do Sheanair air	Community, Heritage, and Tourism Award
Àdhamh Ó Broin	International Award
Ruairidh MacIlleathain	Innovation in Education Award
Beag air Bheag	Learner Award
Siuthad! ("Go on!")	Event Award

=== 2015 ===
Awarded to	Category
John Angus MacKay	Lifetime Achievement Award
Dr John MacInnes	Best Contribution Award
Cuach na Cloinne	Sport Award
Comann Eachdraidh Uibhist a Tuath	Gaelic as an Economic Asset
Linda MacLeod	Young Gaelic Ambassador of the Year Award
Pròiseact nan Ealan	Arts & Culture Award
Ainmean-Àite na h-Alba	Community, Heritage & Tourism Award
Ceòlas	International Award
e-Stòras	Innovation in Education Award
Ceitidh Smith	Learner Award
Blas Festival	Event Award

=== 2014 ===
In 2014 the former Workplace Initiative Award was replaced by the Gaelic as an Economic Asset category.

Awarded to	Category
Katie Anne (Nan) MacDonald	Best Contribution Award
Dolina Ross	Sport Award
Ceòlas	Gaelic as an Economic Asset
Coinneach Mac a' Ghobhainn	Young Gaelic Ambassador of the Year Award
Gairm nan Gaidheal	Arts & Culture Award
Comunn Eachdraidh Nis	Community, Heritage & Tourism Award
Michael Bauer	International Award
Laura Howitt	Innovation in Education Award
Jackie Mullen	Learner Award
Deasbad BT Alba	Event Award

=== 2013 ===
Awarded to	Category
Beathag Mhoireasdan	Best Contribution Award
Colm O' Rua	Sport Award
Fiona Dunn	Workplace Initiative Award
Alasdair MacPhee	Young Gaelic Ambassador of the Year Award
The Campbells of Greepe	Arts & Culture Award
Shawbost Community in association Iomairt Ghàidhlig Iar Thuath Leòdhais	Community, Heritage & Tourism Award
Mìchael Klevenhaus	International Award
Class 4/5 Bun-sgoil Ghàidhlig Inbhir Nis recipe book	Innovation in Education Award
Gàidhlig Dumgal	Learner Award
Na Mo Chuid Aodaich	Event Award

== See also ==
- Sàr Ghaidheal Fellowships
