= James Hunter (historian) =

British academic (born 1948)

- Born: 22 May 1948 (age 78); Scotland

Academic background
- Education: University of Edinburgh

Academic work
- Discipline: History
- Institutions: University of Aberdeen; University of the Highlands and Islands
- Notable works: The Making of the Crofting Community

James Hunter CBE FRSE (born 22 May 1948) is a historian of the Highlands and Islands of Scotland. He is Emeritus Professor of History at the University of the Highlands and Islands.

== Life ==
He completed his Ph.D. thesis at the University of Edinburgh before taking up a post with the Institute for the Study of Sparsely Populated Areas at the University of Aberdeen. In 2005, he founded the Centre for History in Dornoch as part of the University of the Highlands and Islands, and served as the head of the Centre between 2005 and 2010.

He is a freelance historian and author, and has written numerous books on the Highlands and Islands and its global diaspora.

His recent books include Set Adrift Upon the World: The Sutherland Clearances, published in 2015. The book presents the struggle for survival of the people cleared from the straths of Sutherland during the early nineteenth century and relocated to Canada, landing at Hudson Bay. This book was the winner of the Saltire Society's History Book of the Year Award in 2016. In 2019, his account of the Highland Famine of 1846–47, Insurrection: Scotland's Famine Winter was published.

=== Outside academia ===
Hunter has held a number of additional posts outside of academia. He was the director of the Scottish Crofters Union (1985–1990), Chairman of the Isle of Eigg Heritage Trust (2004–2007) and Chairman of Highlands and Islands Enterprise (1998–2004), the Inverness-based development and training agency for the North of Scotland.

== Awards and honours ==
Hunter gave the first Sabhal Mòr Lecture in 1990.

He was awarded a CBE in 2001 for his services to the Highlands and Islands.

He was elected as a Fellow of the Royal Society of Edinburgh in 2007.

== Works ==
=== Books ===
- 1976. The Making of the Crofting Community. Edinburgh: John Donald. (revised edition, 2000, ISBN 0-85976-537-7.)
- 1986. Skye: The Island. Edinburgh: Mainstream. ISBN 1-85158-017-4.
- 1991. The Claim of Crofting: the Scottish Highlands and Islands, 1930-1990. Edinburgh: Mainstream. ISBN 1-85158-329-7.
- 1992. Scottish Highlanders: A People and their Place. Edinburgh: Mainstream. ISBN 1-85158-443-9.
- 1994. A Dance Called America: the Scottish Highlands, the United States and Canada. Edinburgh: Mainstream. ISBN 1-85158-639-3.
- 1995. On the Other Side of Sorrow: nature and people in the Scottish Highlands. Edinburgh: Mainstream. ISBN 1-85158-765-9.
- 1996. Glencoe and the Indians. Edinburgh: Mainstream. ISBN 1-85158-829-9.
- 1999. Last of the Free: A Millennial History of the Highlands and Islands of Scotland Edinburgh: Mainstream. ISBN 1-84018-376-4.
- 2001. Culloden and the Last Clansman. Edinburgh: Mainstream. ISBN 1-84018-483-3.
- 2005. Scottish Exodus: Travels Among a Worldwide Clan. Edinburgh: Mainstream. ISBN 978-1-84596-116-9.
- 2012. From the Low Tide of the Sea to the Highest Mountain Tops. Isle of Lewis: The Islands Book Trust.
- 2015. Set Adrift Upon the World: The Sutherland Clearances. Edinburgh: Birlinn. ISBN 978-1-78027-268-9.
- 2019. Insurrection: Scotland's Famine Winter. Edinburgh: Birlinn. ISBN 978-1-78027-678-6.
- 2021. The Appin Murder: The Killing that Shook a Nation. Edinburgh: Birlinn. ISBN 978-1-78027-720-2.

=== Selected articles ===
- 1976. The Highland Land War of the 1880s, in Burnett, Ray (ed.), Calgacus 3, Spring 1976, pp. 5 – 9, ISSN 0307-2029
- 1981. Year of the Émigré, in The Bulletin of Scottish Politics No. 2, Spring 1981, pp. 56 – 66
- 1991. Rural poverty and deprivation in Europe: from analysis to action: report of a seminar held in Scotland from 7 to 11 October 1990 . Enstone: Arkleton Trust. ISBN 0-906724-40-6.
- 1992. Wilderness in North America and Scotland: the human dimension, in Mollinon, Denis (ed.), Wilderness with People: The Management of Wild Land, John Muir Trust, pp. 6 – 12
- 1992. Guest editorial on the possible privatisation of the Forestry Commission, in Reforesting Scotland No. 7, Autumn 1992, p. 2, ISSN 0964-3451
- 1996. Towards a land reform agenda for a Scots parliament. Perth: Rural Forum Scotland. ISBN 1-85158-765-9.
- 2006. Fonn's Duthchas. National Museums of Scotland. ISBN 978-1-905267-06-4.
