= Arthur Cormack =

Scottish singer & musician (born 1965)

Arthur Cormack OBE
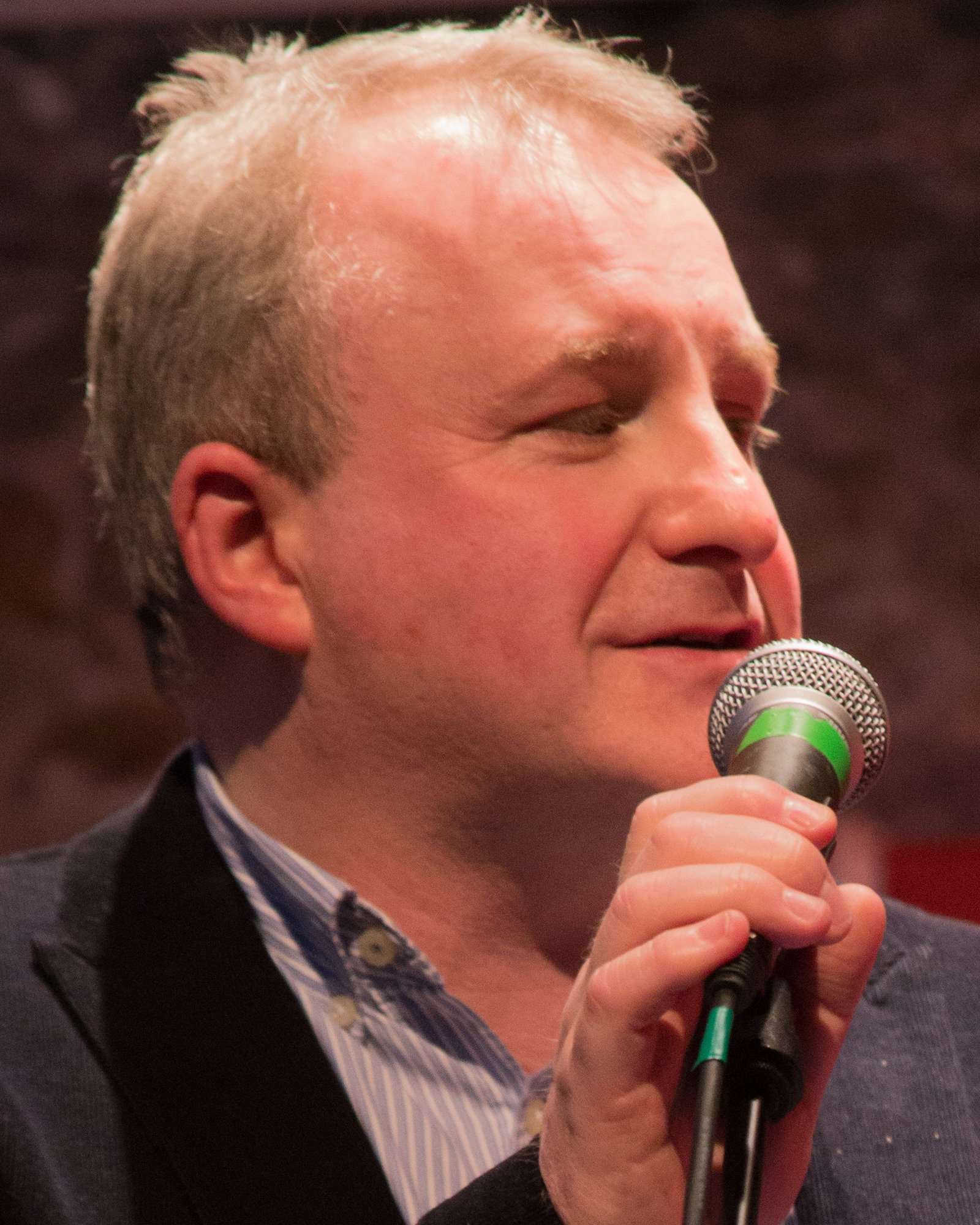
- Cormack singing at Sabhal Mòr Ostaig in 2021.
- Born: 21 April 1965 (age 60); Portree, Scotland
- Education: Portree High School
- Occupations: Former Chief Executive of Fèisean nan Gàidheal, Chairman of Bòrd na Gàidhlig (2009-2012), singer, musician, broadcaster
- Spouse: Shona MacDonald (m. 1991)
- Children: 3
- Honours: OBE (2015)
- Musical career
- Genres: Gaelic song and music
- Instruments: Vocals, keyboards

Arthur Cormack OBE (Scottish Gaelic: Art MacCarmaig; born 21 April 1965) is a Scottish Gaelic singer, musician and broadcaster from Portree, Isle of Skye and was educated at Portree High School.

He was formerly Chief Executive Officer of Fèisean nan Gàidheal, as well as a former chairman of Bòrd na Gàidhlig.

== Music ==
Cormack started competing in Gaelic singing competitions when he was 8 and competing at Mòds when he was 11. He won the coveted Gold Medal at the Motherwell Mòd in 1983 at the age of 18, the youngest male individual to do so, and went on to release his first album, Nuair Bha Mi Òg, the following year aged just 19.

He followed this up in 1989 with the release of his second solo studio album, Ruith na Gaoith, in 1989.

He was part of acclaimed Gaelic supergroups Mac-Talla and Cliar, with Mac-Talla releasing their only studio album Mairidh Gaol is Ceòl in 1994, and Cliar releasing four albums: Cliar in 2000, which was voted the Best Album at the inaugural Scottish Trad Music Awards in 2003, Lasair Dhè in 2001, Gun Tàmh in 2002, and Grinn Grinn in 2005.

In addition to this, he also runs his own Macmeanmna label and continues to guest star on the albums of Blair Douglas.

At the 2011 Scots Trad Music Awards, Cormack received the "Hamish Henderson Services to Traditional Music Award".

Cormack released his third solo studio album, his first for 29 years, in 2018, titled Buanas, which received critical acclaim from critics.

== Gaelic ==
Cormack is a strong advocate for the Scottish Gaelic language. In 2009 he was appointed as the chairman of Bòrd na Gàidhlig, having been the organization's interim chairman since the previous year, as well as Chief Executive of Fèisean nan Gàidheal for many years. He was a proactive chairman, often taking to internet forums to counteract anti-Gaelic sentiment. He stepped down in March 2012. He was also formerly on the Board of Directors of Eden Court Theatre in Inverness and the Scottish Arts Council.

In April 2025 Cormack took over as main host and producer of the Dùrachdan requests show on BBC Radio Nan Gàidheal. He had previously been one of a team of occasional co-hosts, primarily with fellow broadcaster Mairead MacLennan.

Cormack was appointed Officer of the Order of the British Empire (OBE) in the 2015 New Year Honours for services to Gaelic education.

== Personal life ==
Cormack lives in Portree with his wife Shona. They have three children, Ruairidh, Eilidh and Iain.

Eilidh, Ruairidh and Iain are all singers, with Eilidh winning the women's Gold Medal and Ruairidh winning the men's Traditional Gold Medal at the Inverness Mòd in 2014, Ruairidh also winning the men's Gold Medal at the Dunoon Mòd in 2018. Iain went on to win the men's Gold Medal at the Paisley Mòd in 2023. Eilidh is also a member of Scottish traditional band, Sian.

== Discography ==
- Nuair a Bha mi Òg (1984)
- Ruith na Gaoithe (1989)
- Buanas (2018)

=== With Mac-Talla ===
- Mairidh Gaol is Ceòl (1994)

=== With Cliar ===
- Cliar (2000)
- Lasair Dhè (2001)
- Gun Tamh (2002)
- Grinn Grinn (2005)
