= School of Scottish Studies =

Constituent school of the University of Edinburgh

Coordinates: 55°56′34″N 3°11′25″W

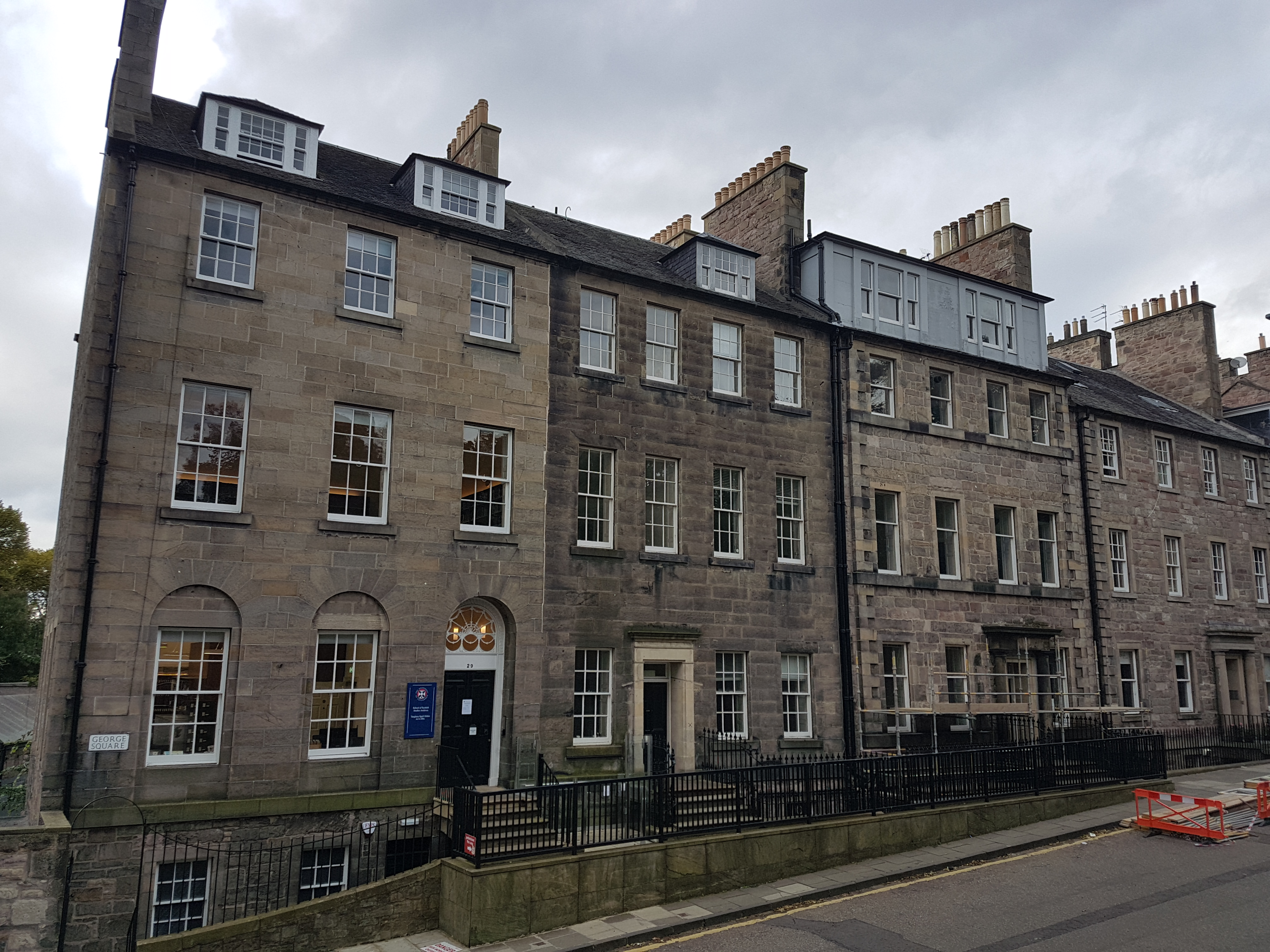
The Scottish Studies Archives on George Square, Edinburgh.

The School of Scottish Studies (Scottish Gaelic: Sgoil Eòlais na h-Alba, Scots: Scuil o Scots Studies) was founded in 1951 at the University of Edinburgh. It holds an archive of approximately 33,000 field recordings of traditional music, song and other lore, housed in George Square, Edinburgh. The collection was begun by Calum Maclean - brother of the poet, Sorley MacLean - and the poet, writer and folklorist, Hamish Henderson, both of whom collaborated with American folklorist Alan Lomax, who is credited as being a catalyst and inspiration for the work of the school.

From 1984 to 1995, the writer, singer and ethnologist, Margaret Bennett - mother of musician Martyn Bennett - worked for the school. In 2012, Mòrag MacLeod, a researcher at the school for forty years, was awarded a Sàr Ghaidheal Fellowship for her contribution to Gaelic language and culture. Other staff who have worked in the School include Alan Bruford, Donald-Archie MacDonald, Emily Lyle, Ian Fraser, Peter Cooke, Margaret MacKay, John MacInnes, Gary West, John Shaw, Cathlin MacAulay, Neill Martin, Katherine Campbell and Will Lamb.

In 1986, the department launched a full undergraduate honours degree programme in Scottish Ethnology, comprising courses in topics such as custom and belief, oral narrative, ethnomusicology, material culture, cultural revivalism, emigrant traditions, traditional drama, heritage and the supernatural world. Following a major re-organisation of the structure of the University of Edinburgh, the teaching of these programmes transferred to the department of Celtic and Scottish Studies within the School of Literature, Languages and Cultures. As of 2024, it offers 4-year MA programmes in Celtic (single and joint honours), Scottish Ethnology (single and joint honours), and Scottish Studies. The title, School of Scottish Studies, now applies to the archival holdings only, and since 2018, it has come under the management of the Centre for Research Collections. In 2010, a significant proportion of the archival audio field recordings were made available via the Tobar an Dualchais / Kist of Riches website, in partnership with the BBC, the National Trust for Scotland and Sabhal Mor Ostaig.

The collection of Scottish Gaelic folklorist Lady Evelyn Stewart Murray is held at the School. The collection documents the now dead Perthshire Gaelic dialect.

== See also ==
- The Singing Street
- William Lindsay Renwick
- Emily Lyle – Scottish ballad scholar and researcher
- Scottish studies
