= Feis =

Traditional Gaelic arts and culture festival

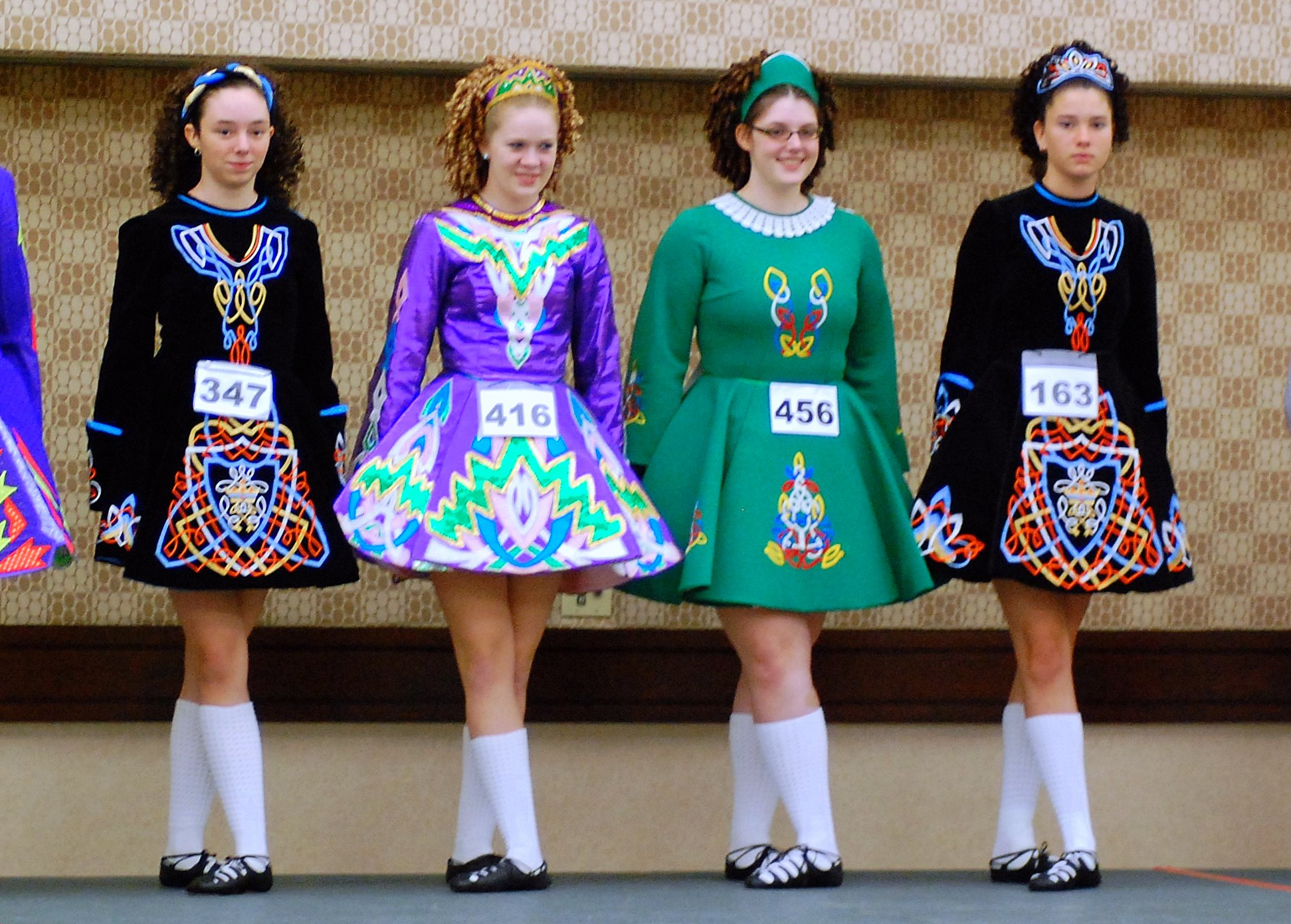
Feis competition

A Feis (Irish pronunciation: [fʲɛʃ]) or Fèis (Scottish Gaelic pronunciation: [feːʃ]) is a traditional Gaelic arts and culture festival. The plural forms are feiseanna (Irish: [ˈfʲɛʃən̪ˠə]) and fèisean (Scottish Gaelic: [ˈfeːʃən]). The term feis is commonly used referring to Irish dance competitions and, in Ireland, to immersive teaching courses, specialising in traditional music and culture. Although it is Irish, in Scottish Gaelic, the accent is important because there is a difference of meaning and pronunciation between feis and fèis — the word feis means sexual intercourse.

== History ==
In Ancient Ireland communities placed great importance on local festivals, where Gaels could come together in song, dance, music, theatre and sport. The largest of these was the Aonach, the great festival at Tara, which was then the city of Ireland's Ardrí, or "High King".

These feiseanna were a rich opportunity for storytellers to reach a large audience, and often warriors would recount their exploits in combat, clansmen would trace family genealogies, and bards and balladeers would lead the groups in legends, stories, and song.

These gatherings eventually gave rise to athletic and sporting competitions, including horse- and chariot-racing, as well as feats of strength and endurance.

== Modern Fèisean (Scottish) ==
Over the past thirty years, the Fèis movement has rapidly gained momentum across Scotland. The Fèis movement came about when a group of parents and other individuals – including Fr Colin MacInnes, Màiri T MacKinnon, Dr Angus MacDonald, Kenna Campbell and Ishbel T MacDonald – on the Isle of Barra became concerned that local traditions were dying out and that island children were not being taught traditional music in the context of formal education. To address this issue the first Fèis Bharraigh was held on the island in 1981. Inspired by the success of this first Fèis, many other communities throughout Scotland established similar events. Today there are 47 Fèisean, each one community-led and tailored to local needs.

The modern fèis is an opportunity for individuals to come together to develop skills in the Gaelic arts – song, dance, drama, and traditional music on a wide range of instruments. Commitment to Gaelic language and culture is central to the Fèis ethos, with opportunities for the use and transmission of Gaelic language within each fèis, a core aspect.

Tuition is designed to be accessible, but professional and effective. The focus of activity for most Fèisean is an annual, week-long festival, but increasingly Fèisean offer a full programme of year-round follow-on classes to encourage sustained provision.

The skills taught at Fèisean are a highly valued aspect of the informal education of young people, as demonstrated by the level of volunteer commitment and parental support in local areas. Most importantly, the Fèis experience is valued by the young participants themselves. At national level, the Fèisean are seen by many as one of the most successful arts initiatives in Scotland.

== Modern Feiseanna (Irish) ==
Today the Feis has experienced something of a rebirth, both for ethnic Gaels and for enthusiasts of the Gaelic culture in Ireland and Scotland, as well as throughout the world.

Feiseanna are generally centred on Irish dancing. When competitors begin to dance in these competitions, they traditionally wear a dance costume decided on by their dance school. When these students reach a competition level decided on by the dance school, they can design or choose a costume of their own. Girls wear ornate dresses with long sleeves and short skirt. The skirt panels are sometimes stiffened with cardboard inserts, but ballet-like "soft-skirts" have become the norm. They usually wear their hair curled, in a wig, in a bun wig or just down. Boys usually wear a dress shirt, tie and/or waistcoat, and dress trousers or a kilt.

The most important Feiseanna in Irish Dance are the Oireachtas competitions. There are regional Oireachtas competitions in Eastern and Western Canada, Northeast, Midwest, Southern and Western US, plus locations in Europe (Especially GB and Ireland) and Australia. Regional Oireachtas are open only to dancers from their defined region, and serve as qualifying competitions for National and World Oireachtas. Important National Oireachtas include North American Nationals (NANs), All Irelands, and All Great Britains.

The most prestigious competition for top dancers is the Oireachtas Rince na Cruinne (the World Championships), held each Easter Week and in a different city each year.

== See also ==
- Ardfheis, originally the name of the Conradh na Gaeilge Feis, now used of Irish political party conferences
- Eisteddfod, the Welsh equivalent of a Feis.
- Fèisean nan Gàidheal, the Scottish Gaelic arts youth tuition festivals.
