= Meanbh-chuileag =

Scottish theatre company

Meanbh-chuileag (Scottish Gaelic for 'Highland midge'; pronounced [ˈmɛnɛv ˈxulak]) is a Gaelic theatre-in-education company which operates as a Fèisean nan Gàidheal project. The initiative was established in 2000 as a Fèis Dhùn Èideann outreach project, and was based in Gracemount in Edinburgh between July 2002 and May 2006, when it moved to Inverness.

To date, Meanbh-chuileag has visited more than 300 schools across Scotland, and more than 10,000 children have seen a Meanbh-chuileag play.

== See also ==
- Fèisean nan Gàidheal
