= An Leabhar Mòr =

An Leabhar Mòr: The Great Book of Gaelic
- Language: Gaelic, English
- Genre: Poetry
- ISBN: 978-1-84195-250-5 (Paperback)

An Leabhar Mòr, subtitled The Great Book of Gaelic, is a book containing the work of more than 150 poets, calligraphers and artists from Scotland and Ireland. First published in 2002 by Proiseact nan Ealan (the Gaelic Arts Agency), it contains an anthology of poetry in Irish and Scottish Gaelic from the 6th to the 20th century combined with artwork and calligraphy by contemporary artists. It has been described by its publishers as a "21st-century Book of Kells". Older poems are given translations into modern Gaelic of both varieties as well as English.

A film about the project, Is Mise an Teanga, was directed by Murray Grigor in 2003, and has subsequently been shown on BBC Alba.

== See also ==
- Columba Initiative
