= Bard's blessing =

Scottish Custom

The bard's blessing (Scottish Gaelic: beannachadh-bàird) or poet's congratulation, was the custom of old in the Scottish Highlands of old, to meet the bride coming forth from her chamber with her maidens on the morning after her marriage and to salute her with a poetical blessing called beannachadh-bàird.

The earliest reference to beannachadh bàird comes from the postscript of a letter from Professor Garden to John Aubrey, written in Aberdeen 1691–1692. The definition given came from a divinity student from Strathspey whose informant was his father, aged 97.

"A Bard in common Irish signifies a little poet or a fhymer, they use to travel thorow countries and caming into ane house, salute with a rhym called in Irish Beannacha p baird, i.e. the Bard's salutation qch is onlie a short verse or rhym touching the praise of the master and mistris of the house."

If at any jovial meeting, any man retired, for however short a time, he was obliged, before he was permitted to resume his seat, to make an apology for his absence in rhyme.

If he had no talent for poetry, or if, from humour he did not choose to comply, which was seldom the case, he was obliged to pay such a proportion of the reckoning as the company thought proper to propose. This according to Martin Martin was beannachadh-bàird.
