= Sàr Ghaidheal Fellowships =

Annual award given by the Gaelic college

The Sàr Ghàidheal Fellowships (Scottish Gaelic: Duaisean nan Sàr Ghàidheal, [ˈt̪uəʃən nən̪ˠ ˈs̪aːɾ ˈɣɛː.əl̪ˠ]) are an annual award given by the Gaelic college Sabhal Mòr Ostaig to people who have made exceptional contributions to the Scottish Gaelic Language.

Award winners
Year	Awarded to	Contribution	Reference
2009	Donald Meek from Tiree	Research and role in Gaelic education	
2010	Flora MacNeil MBE from Barra	Gaelic singing	
2010	Calum Ferguson from Point	Production of Gaelic resources and media	
2011	Jonathan MacDonald from Kilmuir	Gaelic activities in the North of Skye	
2011	John Farquhar Munro from Shiel Bridge	Supporting Gaelic at a political level	
2012	Fr. Calum MacLellan from Glasgow		
2012	Mòrag MacLeod from Scalpay	Long-standing work at the School of Scottish Studies	
2013	Dr Finlay MacLeod from Lewis	Founding member of Sabhal Mòr Ostaig	
2013	Duncan MacQuarrie from Mull	Long-standing work in Gaelic education	
2014	Chrissie Dick		
2014	Lachie Dick		
2015	Rory MacDonald	Runrig	
2015	Calum MacDonald	Runrig	
2017	Rev Dr Roderick MacLeod		
2017	John MacLeod		
2018	Margaret MacLeod		
2018	Iain MacFarlane		
2019	Agnes Rennie		
2019	Cailean MacLean		

== See also ==
- Scottish Gaelic Awards
