= Fèisean nan Gàidheal =

Fèisean nan Gàidheal is the National Association of Scottish Gaelic Arts Youth Tuition Festivals. Established in 1988, it is the support organisation for the Fèisean (Scottish Gaelic: Festivals) which are local Gaelic Arts festivals. The current Chief Executive Officer is Calum Alex MacMillan.

In 2016, their project Fuaran was nominated for Community Project of the Year at MG ALBA Scots Trad Music Awards. Fuaran brought together young singers, aged 16–24, and tradition-bearers from the community to record traditional Gaelic songs.

== See also ==
- Meanbh-chuileag
