= Bòrd na Gàidhlig =

Agency of the Scottish Government

NDPB overview
- Formed: 13 February 2006
- Jurisdiction: Scotland
- Headquarters: Inverness
- Employees: 19
- NDPB executive: Shona NicIlleathain
- Website: www.gaidhlig.scot

Bòrd na Gàidhlig (pronounced [ˈpɔːrˠt̪ nə ˈkaːlɪkʲ], lit. 'Gaelic Board') is the executive non-departmental public body of the Scottish Government with responsibility for Gaelic. It was established by an Act of the Scottish Parliament in 2005 (which took effect in early 2006) and is based in Inverness.

== Structure ==
Bòrd na Gàidhlig is a non-departmental public body constituted of members of the board, whose role is "to provide leadership, direction, support and guidance" to the body, and staff who are typically full-time public sector employees and who carry out the day-to-day work of the body. The head of the board is the cathraiche (chairperson) and the head of the staff is the ceannard (chief executive).

The current ceannard is Shona NicIlleathain; a non-native Gaelic speaker, she studied the language at the University of Edinburgh and Sabhal Mòr Ostaig and had worked at the Bòrd for twenty years prior to taking over the office in June 2016.

== History ==
In 2006 Bòrd na Gàidhlig was designated as the body responsible for implementing the Gaelic Language (Scotland) Act 2005 and specifically, as stated in the Act, "securing the status of the Gaelic language as an official language of Scotland commanding equal respect to the English language". The Bòrd represents a cornerstone of the Scottish Government's implementation of their duties under the European Charter for Regional or Minority Languages.

The first cathraiche of the eight member Bòrd was Donnchadh MacFhearghais (Duncan Ferguson) from Islay, rector of Plockton High School, former convenor of Comunn Luchd-Ionnsachaidh, Comunn na Gàidhlig, and director of the steering committee for BBC Gaelic programming. In March 2012, following the resignation of Arthur Cormack, who had been appointed in February 2009 after holding the position of interim Chair from July 2008, Elizabeth McAtear was appointed by the Bòrd as interim Chair before the full recruitment process for a replacement Chair.

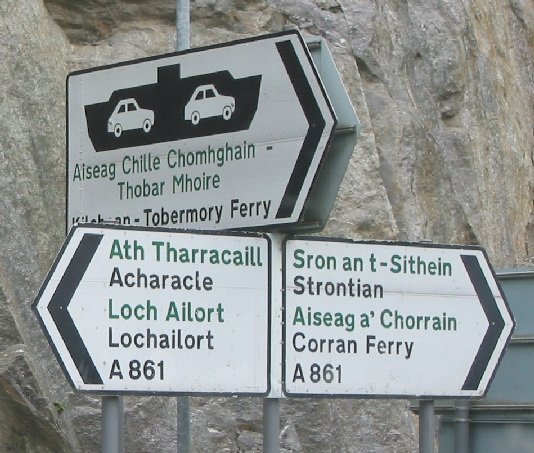
Place names in their original Gaelic are becoming increasingly common on road signs throughout the Scottish Highlands.

== See also ==
- Gàidhealtachd
- Languages of Scotland
- Language revitalization
- Pròiseact nan Ealan
- Columba Project
- Foras na Gaeilge, all-Ireland agency set up to promote the Irish language under the Good Friday Agreement of 1998.
