= Columba Project =

Scottish-Irish Gaelic language program

Columba Project Iomairt Cholm Cille
- Formation: 1997
- Founder: Foras na Gaeilge; Bòrd na Gàidhlig
- Type: Pan-Gaelicism; Gaelic languages Gaelic culture
- Headquarters: Belfast, Gaoth Dobhair & Inverness
- Website: colmcille.net

The Columba Project (Gaelic: Iomairt Cholm Cille), formerly known as the Columba Initiative, is a program for Gaelic speakers in Scotland and Ireland to meet each other more often, and in so doing to learn more of the language, heritage and lifestyles of one another. It was named after Colm Cille (St Columba, 521–597 AD), whose monasteries shaped and spanned the Gaelic world of Ireland and Scotland.

== Scope ==
It involves Scotland and Ireland, but not the Isle of Man, which has its own Gaelic language, Manx. However the Isle of Man has become increasingly involved in the Initiative in recent years. The Initiative provides a channel for interaction, cultural exchange and relationship building over complex geographical and political boundaries. Its activities include community exchanges, cultural events, language courses and an annual youth parliament.

== History ==
It was launched in 1997 by the President of Ireland, Mary Robinson and Brian Wilson MP, Scottish Minister of State for Education, Industry and Gaelic:

"to foster support for the Gaelic language and develop links between Gaelic Scotland and Ireland."

The immediate inspiration for the project came from Mary Robinson's Sabhal Mòr Lecture in 1997, at which she spoke of the possibility of creating "an island space" for Gaelic language and culture. The Scottish office of the initiative is therefore located at Sabhal Mòr Ostaig in Skye.

== Aims ==
The Columba Initiative was inspired by the demand from Gaelic speakers in Scotland and Ireland for the chance to meet each other more often, and in so doing to learn more of the language, heritage and lifestyles of one another. This interaction is intended to support Gaelic-speaking communities in Ireland and Scotland in the present and future. It aims through its work:

- "to develop strategies and projects in which the Gaelic language in Ireland and Scotland can draw together people from diverse backgrounds, within and between each country and region."
- "to develop new relationships between communities and speakers of Irish and Scottish Gaelic and enhance the links already existing."
- "to facilitate practical and sustainable co-operation between communities, networks and speakers of Irish and Scottish Gaelic in the arts, and in social and cultural matters."
- "to encourage debate on common concerns in social, cultural and economic issues with a view to building self-confidence within the Gaelic language communities."
- "to heighten awareness of the contribution of Gaelic to the cultural identity of both Ireland and Scotland."
- "to foster understanding of the diverse experience and culture of the Irish and Scottish Gaelic communities."
- "to promote and facilitate the learning of Scottish Gaelic in Ireland, and Irish Gaelic in Scotland."
- "to identify, initiate and develop projects and partnerships in line with the above."

== See also ==
- Composite rules shinty–hurling
- An Leabhar Mòr
