= Pròiseact nan Ealan =

Pròiseact nan Ealan is the Scottish Gaelic arts agency. It was set up in 1987 for the development of the Scottish Gaelic arts. Based in Stornoway, Isle of Lewis it is a not for profit limited company and charity. Its projects have won many awards including foreign film festivals and its best known project is An Leabhar Mòr.
