= Scottish Crofting Federation =

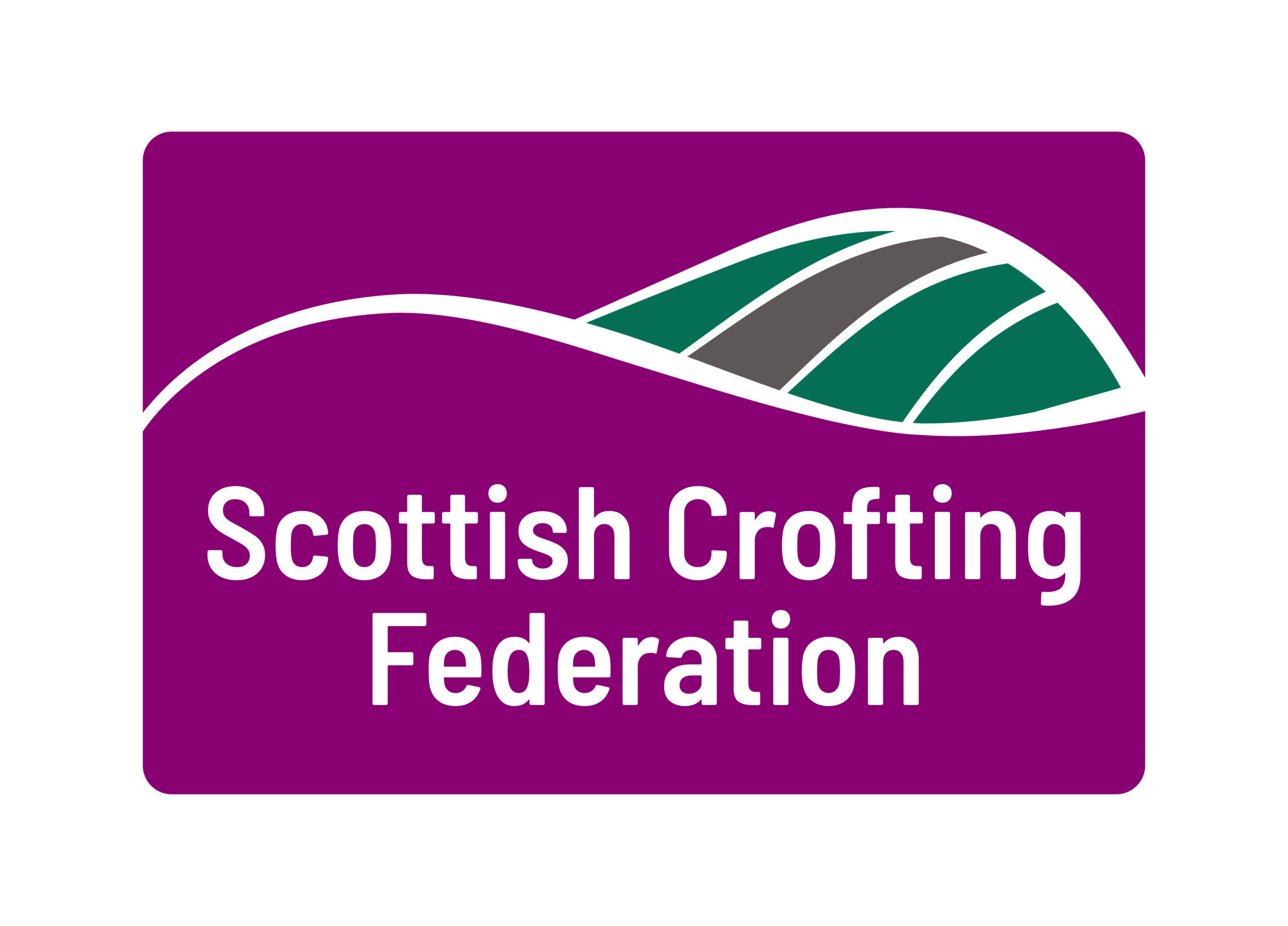
The official Logo for the federation.

The Scottish Crofting Federation (SCF), formerly called the Scottish Crofting Foundation (also formerly called the Scottish Crofters Union), is an organization of crofting communities in the highlands and islands of Scotland.

The SCF's mission is to safeguard and promote the rights, livelihoods, and culture of crofters and their communities. Its magazine is called The Crofter.

== SCF (Scottish Crofting Federation) ==
The SCF is a charity dedicated to safeguarding crofting and its cultural heritage. Established and run by crofters, SCF engages with agencies and government at a local, national, and international level to influence policy on rural issues including sustaining rural populations, food production, and environmental protection. It also provides a network of support to established, new, and aspiring crofters through training, mentoring, and sharing of experience.

== Scottish crofting produce mark ==
The Scottish crofting produce mark was introduced in 2008 to identify products produced by a croft or similar small agri-business that is located in the Highlands or the Islands of Scotland.

Only those businesses that qualify and are members of the Scottish Crofting Federation may place the mark on their products. The federation states on its website that it plans to enforce product quality, cleanliness, and traceability, as well as ensure animals are healthy and reasonably treated.

== Importance of crofting ==
Crofting has sustained rural communities in many areas in Western Europe. Crofting provides certain benefits to the local community.

Small-scale eco-friendly systems, as practiced by crofters, is an alternative to industrial agriculture.

Much of the UK's High Nature Value farming is found in the crofting areas. Extensive land management methods have created and preserved the habitats of rare species now threatened elsewhere in the UK, and continuing crofting land use is recognized as having an important role in maintaining and increasing biodiversity.

== Opposition to marine protected areas ==
The SCF opposes Highly Protected Marine Areas, a proposal from the Scottish government to create marine protected areas.

== Indigenous people ==
The SCF is currently involved in activities to encourage the UK government to recognize crofters as indigenous people of Scotland.

== See also ==
- Agriculture in the United Kingdom
- Agriculture in Scotland
