= Scotlandshire =

Scottish political term referring to anglicisation or its relationship with England

Scotlandshire is a term used to denote either the anglicisation of Scotland or the subordinate political relationship with England. It is recorded as early as 1706 in James Hodges's anti-Union Third Treatise.

By placing the suffix -shire after the country's name, the term parodies the early modern tendency to place the word -shire after some ancient Scottish regions, as well as implicating in a tongue-in-cheek manner that Scotland has the status of an English county, rather than that of a distinct nation. Hence, the term is political in nature.

Several historic regions of Scotland have at times had the suffix -shire added when Scotland broadly adopted English-style county councils during the 19th century.

- Argyll - Argyllshire
- Bute (County of) - Buteshire
- Fife - Fifeshire
- Moray - Morayshire (or Elginshire)
- Ross - Ross-shire
- Sutherland - Sutherlandshire

Others have alternative names ending in -shire.

- Angus - Forfarshire
- East Lothian - Haddingtonshire
- Midlothian - Edinburghshire
- West Lothian - Linlithgowshire

== See also ==
- Scottish cultural cringe
- Scottish national identity
- Tartanry
- North Briton
