= Sure Seaters =

2001 nonfiction book by Barb Wilinsky

Sure Seaters: The Emergence of Art House Cinema is a nonfiction book written by Barbara Wilinsky. The book was published in 2001 by the University of Minnesota Press.

== Synopsis ==
Wilinsky examines the material culture of movie theaters in New York and Chicago during the late 1940s rather than analyzing the films themselves. This allows her track the history of the emergence of Art Cinema in a focused study. This focus allows Wilinsky to trace the economic and social origins of the alternative cinema movement. She argues that the way films are categorized is shaped by hidden socio-economic factors and audience demographics, rather than just the content of the movies.

Wilkinson combines historical documents with theories by Pierre Bourdieu and Herbert J. Gans. Hence, the book is able to provide rationales for why alternative cinemas became popular during an era known for its conformity. While fields like art history and cultural studies frequently analyze consumer subcultures and the places where art is displayed, this approach is less common in film studies. Wilinsky applies these methods to film, demonstrating that the popularity of highly regarded artistic movies was driven by cultural and economic forces rather than simply their artistic quality.
