= Symbolic religiosity =

Term in sociology

Symbolic religiosity is a term coined by sociologist Herbert Gans.

Gans explores the concept of symbolic religiosity as a concept parallel to, although separate from symbolic ethnicity. To Gans, symbolic religiosity is religious behavior detached from any comprehensive religious observance or religious affiliation.

Symbolic religiosity is common among immigrant communities, as members of a diaspora can use the symbols of religion to preserve values and beliefs from their place of origin.

== Examples ==
=== Christianity ===
Among the second-generation Korean-American community, participation in ethnic Korean Protestant churches is often seen as a way of preserving Korean values, language and culture, as well as a way to access social networks and meet other ethnic Koreans in a majority non-Korean society. While many Korean-American churchgoers are religious, many are not, and view Christianity as a method of cultural transmission for the Korean identity. There is an emphasis on the value of filial piety (a staple of the Korean worldview introduced by Confucianism) through biblical studies and the language of Christianity.

=== Islam ===
Young European Muslims often do not believe in a higher power nor observe daily religious practices, but may participate in religious festivals, weddings and circumcision ceremonies as a member of their Muslim-origin migrant communities.

A 2006 survey by Küçükcan concluded that while young British teenagers of Turkish and Cypriot descent feel positively about Islam, the majority of them do not observe important Islamic events (such as the Kandil days), do not attend Mosque and lack basic religious knowledge (such as the five pillars of Islam). Despite this lack of religious observance, young British Turks often identify as Muslims as a symbolic marker of cultural identity, and may participate in prayer and religious holidays. As one respondent reported, "Being a Muslim is our identity. Sometimes we may ignore practical aspects of it, but we are still Muslims".

The "Muslim atheist" identity is sometimes used to express the symbolic religious loyalty faced by former Muslims who face discrimination in a Christian-majority society despite not believing in religion.

=== Judaism ===
Examples of symbolic Judaism include what Gans calls a "Jewish objects culture" found in secular Jewish households: items with the Star of David, candlesticks, art with Jewish themes, etc. These objects lend a "religious decoration" to otherwise non-Jewish activities. Another example of symbolic Judaism is the celebration of the theologically minor holiday of Chanukah by non-observant Jewish parents as a way to strengthen their child's Jewish identity once a year.

A 2018 survey of Jewish residents of Savannah, Georgia found that symbolic religiosity was associated with having a non-Jewish spouse, being female and viewing Jewishness as "inherited" instead of "chosen". In addition, living in the Southern United States led to a lower level of symbolic religiosity regarding religious services among those surveyed.

== See also ==
- Spiritual but not religious
- Non-denominational
