= Tartanry =

Stereotypical representation of Scottish culture

Tartanry is the stereotypical or kitsch representation of traditional Scottish culture, particularly by the emergent Scottish tourism industry in the 18th and 19th centuries, and later by the American film industry. The earliest use of the word "tartanry" itself has been traced to 1973. The phenomenon was explored in Scotch Myths, a culturally influential exhibition devised by Barbara and Murray Grigor and Peter Rush, mounted at the Crawford Centre at the University of St Andrews in the Spring of 1981. Related terms are tartanitis, Highlandism, Balmorality, Sir Walter Scottishness, tartanism, tartan-tat, and the tartan terror.

== Definitions ==
In its simplest definition, tartanry is 'sentimental Scottishness'. More broadly, tartanry is the perceived reduction of Scottish culture to kitsch, twee, distorted imagery based on ethnic stereotypes – such as tartan, kilts, bagpipes, caber tossing, and haggis. Often the image presented is that of the Highlander as noble savage. While there are strong, legitimate cultural traditions behind Scottish clan societies and the older textile designs that preceded the modern tartans and kilts, and instruments like bagpipes are a part of the living musical traditions, tartanry is when these things are tokenised, caricatured, or attached to fabricated histories. While Scottish Gaelic is a living language, that has developed and grown with modern culture, tartanry presents it as a dead relic and curiosity, and those acting from this perspective may simply redefine words, or change their spellings to gibberish, for no other reason than to appear quaint or exotic.

Tartanry is defined by literary scholar Cairns Craig (2015) as "the false glamour that Scott had foisted on Scotland and which had turned it into Brigadoon." David McCrone (1992) defined it as "a set of garish symbols appropriated by lowland Scotland at a safe distance from 1745, and turned into a music-hall joke." Lauren Brancaz (2016) defines tartanry broadly, as "the derogatory term ... encompassing all stereotypes about Scotland, not just the excessive use of tartan".

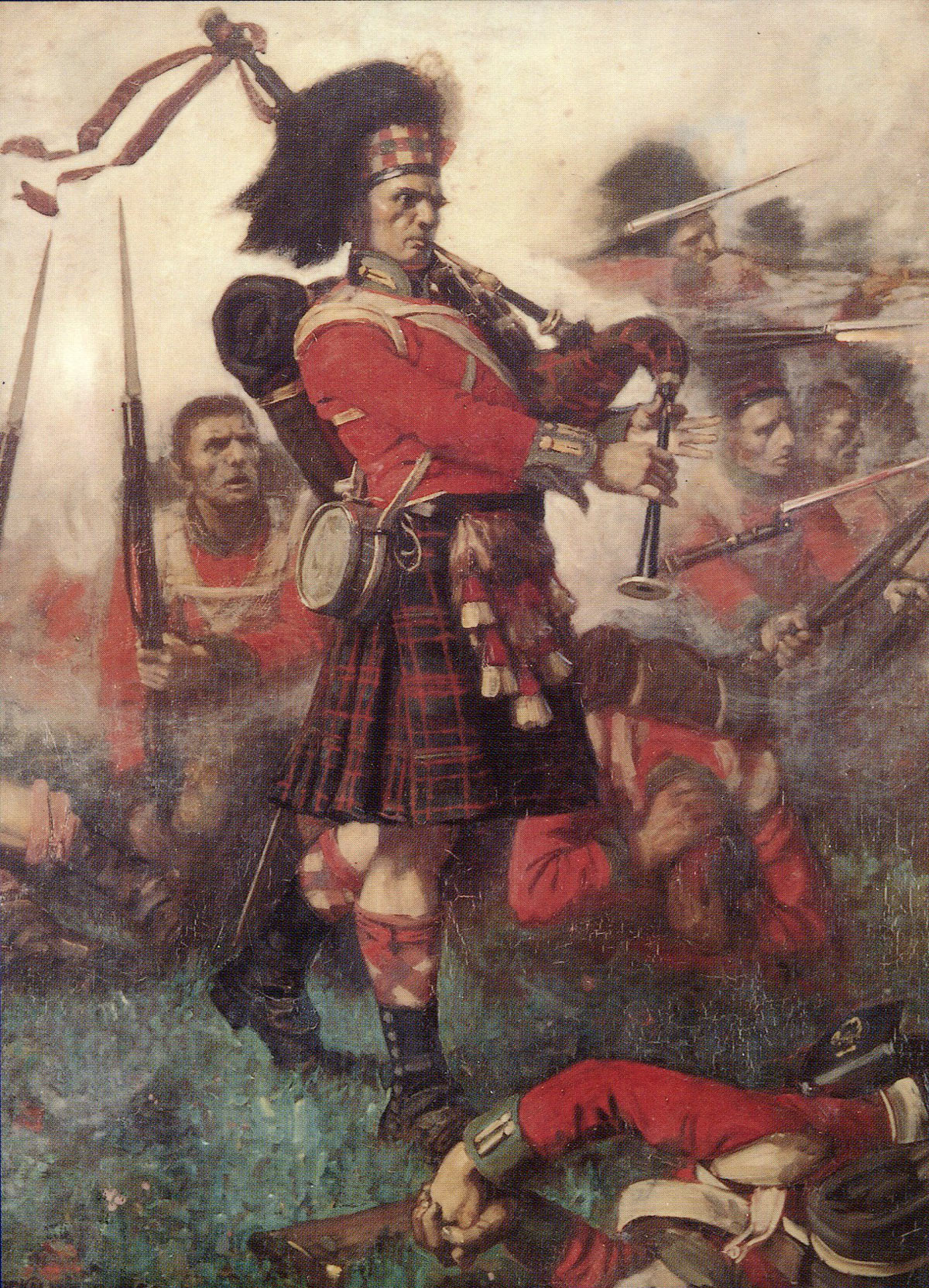
One type of Highlandism: a very romanticised and hyper-masculinised view of Highland men as "natural-bred warriors", in this case Highland regiment soldiers at the Battle of Waterloo (1815) by William Lockhart Bogle, 1893

Highlandism has been used as a superset of tartanry by some writers, while folklorist James Porter (1998) distinguishes them more analytically:

tartanry: the cult of tartan as a symbol of identity, which is indelibly linked to the Romantic movement in literature and the arts of the late-eighteenth century. ... Highlandism: the cult of the Highlands as visual and poetic metaphor, which is involved not only with that Romantic, Ossian-influenced past but also with cultural patrimony and the vexed question of land ownership.

Highlandism has also been described as "a product of Union and Empire ... the whole of Scotland being marked by those symbols normally associated with the Highlands", especially after the early 19th century. Highlandism allowed the tartan-clad Highland rebel warrior to be reimagined as what Tom Nairn (1977) called a neutralised, nostalgic "tartan monster", a national kilted attraction, "a popular sub-romanticism, and not the vital national culture whose absence is so often lamented after Scott." Nairn tied tartanry to kailyard literature as two forms of parochial sentimentalism about rural Scotland, arising at a time when the country was losing literary and other talent to emigration, leaving behind "a rootless vacuum .... forming a huge virtually self-contained universe of Kitsch". The term Highlandism has relatedly but more narrowly also been academically applied to an idealised "noble savage" depiction of Highland masculinity as natural-bred for warfare and military service though an environment supposedly uncivilised, harsh, wild, and patriarchal.

Balmorality, called a particular "dimension of tartanry", was coined by George Scott-Moncrieff to refer to upper-class appropriation of Highland cultural trappings, marked by "hypocrisy" and "false sentiment" that trivialised the past and was an escapism from social realities. The term is a reference to Queen Victoria's purchase of Balmoral Castle in 1842 for a years-long retreat, decorating it in excessive amounts of tartan, and her subsequent patronage of "Highland" styles and activities with her consort, Prince Albert.

Ivor Brown (1955) coined the term tartanitis as distinct from Balmorality:

... a Lowlander himself, [Harry Lauder] promoted the idea ... that the workmen of Clydesdale habitually went aroaming in the gloaming clothed like the chieftain of Clan McCrazy. The proper name for this type of Highland fever is not Balmorality, but Tartanitis

Tartanism was suggested in 1992 by Ian McKay as a distinct term for the zealous adoption of tartan, kilts, and other symbols of Scotland by Scottish expatriates and multi-generational diaspora in North America and elsewhere.

Tartan-tat refers to cheap tartan-themed goods intended for tourists, including Chinese-made knockoff Highland-dress items, such as those which fill tourist-trap shops in Scotland. The phrase the tartan terror for such kitsch products dates back to at least 1965. Tartan-tat has its origins in tartanware, tartan-decorated household items sold to early tourists in the Highlands in the Regency through Victorian eras.

== History ==
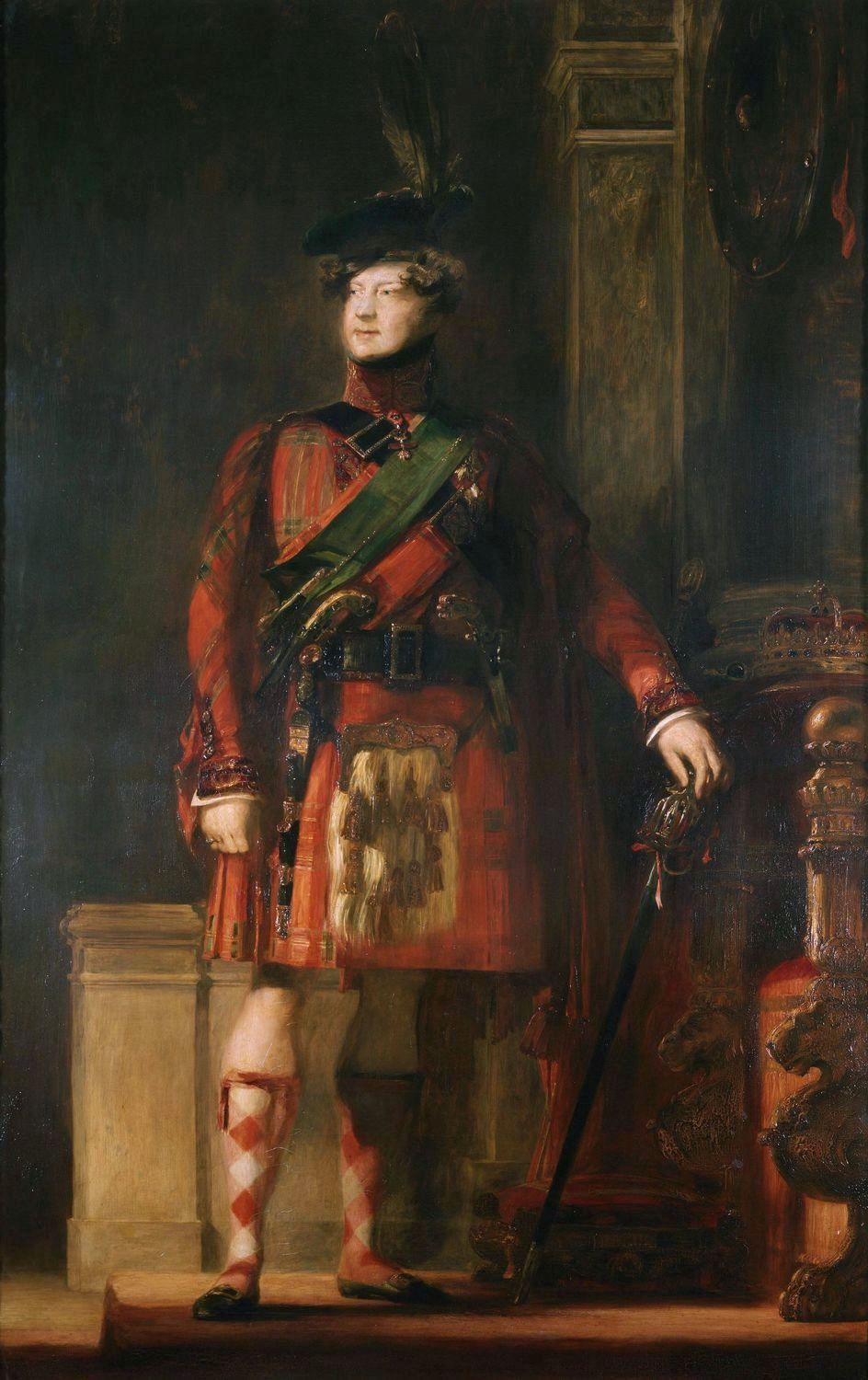
George IV in Highland Dress, 1829. David Wilkie's flattering portrait of the kilted King George IV

Prior to 1745, everyday Highlanders wore traditional kilts. These long pieces of tartan fabric were helpful when it came time to sleep on the cold, damp Scottish moors.

Modern historians suggest that due to economic and social change, the clan system in the Highlands was already declining by the time of the failed 1745 rising. In its aftermath, the British government enacted a series of laws that attempted to speed the process, including a ban on the bearing of arms, the wearing of Highland dress (in the Dress Act 1746), and limitations on the activities of the Roman Catholic Church. Most of the legislation was repealed by the end of the eighteenth century as the Jacobite threat subsided. There was soon a process of the rehabilitation of Highland culture. The Dress Act was repealed in 1782, and tartan was adopted for Highland regiments in the British army, which poor Highlanders joined in large numbers until the end of the Napoleonic Wars in 1815. However, by the nineteenth century tartan had largely been abandoned by the ordinary people, with the upper-class nobles adopting the dress.

In the 1820s, as part of the Romantic revival, tartan and the kilt were adopted by members of the social elite, not just in Scotland, but across Europe. The international craze for tartan, and for idealising a romanticised Highlands, was set off by the Ossian cycle published by Scottish poet James Macpherson in 1761-2. Sir Walter Scott's Waverley novels further helped popularise select aspects of Scottish life and history and he founded the Celtic Society of Edinburgh in 1820. He staged the royal visit of George IV to Scotland in 1822 and the king's wearing of tartan. George IV was the first reigning monarch to visit Scotland in 171 years. Scott and the Celtic Society urged Scots to attend festivities "all plaided and plumed in their tartan array". One contemporary writer sarcastically described the pomp that surrounded the celebrations as "Sir Walter's Celtified Pageantry". Nevertheless, the result was a massive upsurge in demand for kilts and tartans that could barely be met by the Scottish textile industry.

Lord Macaulay, son of an Argyll family, wrote in 1848 of the Romantic reinvention of Highland customs:

Soon the vulgar imagination was so completely occupied by plaids, targets, and claymores, that, by most Englishmen, Scotchman and Highlander were regarded as synonymous words. Few people seemed to be aware that, at no remote period, a Macdonald or a Macgregor in his tartan was to a citizen of Edinburgh or Glasgow what an Indian hunter in his war paint is to an inhabitant of Philadelphia or Boston. Artists and actors represented Bruce and Douglas in striped petticoats. They might as well have represented Washington brandishing a tomahawk, and girt with a string of scalps.

The designation of individual clan tartans was largely defined in this period and they became a major symbol of Scottish identity. The fashion for all things Scottish was maintained by Queen Victoria, who helped secure the popularity of the tartan fashion and the identity of Scotland as a tourist destination. Her Highland enthusiasm led to the design of two new tartan patterns, "Victoria" and "Balmoral". The latter was named after her castle Balmoral in Aberdeenshire, which from 1852 became a major royal residence; today Balmoral remains the tartan of the British royal family.

== Critical approaches ==
Colin McArthur, a British Film Institute analyst of Scottish media culture, wrote (1981–82):

The Tartanry/Kailyard ensemble permits and foregrounds only certain types of flora, fauna and humankind, the privileged icons being thistles, heather, stags, highland cattle, Scotch terriers, tartaned figures (often with military connotations), and a handful of historical figures of whom Burns and Scott are preeminent.

John Caughie, a Scottish media and communications professor, wrote (1982):

It is precisely [because of] the regressiveness of the frozen discourses of Tartanry and Kailyard that they provide ... such a reservoir of Scottish "characters", Scottish "attitudes" and Scottish "views" which can be drawn upon to give the "flavour of Scotland", a petrified culture with a misty, mythic, and above all, static past.

Ian Brown, a professor studying Scottish literature and culture, suggests (2012) that both of those views are an oversimplifying caricature of the caricatures, in assimilating two unrelated tropes with each other despite tartanry (Highland stereotyping) and kailyard (Lowland stereotyping) being distinct, both as to origin and motivation, and further argues that "as is shown by their continually developing and widespread presence ... [they] are far from frozen, rather being dynamic." He suggests that understanding contemporary Scottish culture involves viewing the varied and changing nature of tartanry (and tartan, and notions of "Scottishness", with an interaction of legend and history) analytically as cultural and historical phenomena without imposing prejudicial and reductive definitions.

== See also ==
- Brigadoon
- Kailyard school
- Kirkin' o' the Tartan
- List of tartans
- Plastic Paddy
- Scottish cringe
- Scottish national identity
- Stereotypes of Irish people
- Symbolic ethnicity
- The White Heather Club
- Vestiarium Scoticum
- Visit of George IV to Scotland
