= Symbolic ethnicity =

Concept in sociology

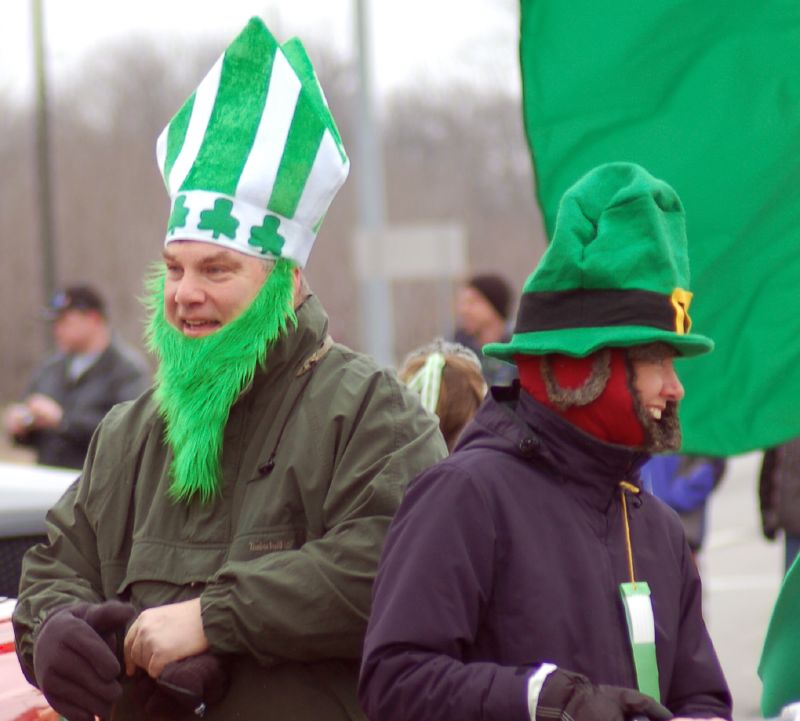
In the culture of the U.S., the celebration of Saint Patrick's Day, by many Americans, not just of Irish descent, is an example of symbolic ethnicity.

In sociology, symbolic ethnicity is a nostalgic allegiance to, love for, and pride in a cultural tradition that can be felt and lived without having to be incorporated to the person's everyday behavior; as such, a symbolic ethnic identity usually is composed of images from mass communications media.

== Etymology ==
The term was introduced in the article "Symbolic Ethnicity: The Future of Ethnic Groups and Cultures in America" (1979), by Herbert J. Gans, in the journal Ethnic and Racial Studies.

== Development ==
The development of symbolic ethnicity, as a sociological phenomenon, is attributed to mainly to ethnic European immigrants of second and subsequent generations, because "Black, Hispanic, Asian and Indian Americans do not have the option of a symbolic ethnicity, at present, in the United States"; a socio-economic circumstance "in which ethnicity does not matter for white Americans, [yet] it does matter for non-whites".

This view, however, ignores the complicated history of actual race relations in the United States, including persons of Black ancestry who appeared phenotypically close enough to perceived norms of "whiteness" to allow them to pass as White. It also ignores the reality of many Americans of Cuban, Argentine, and other Latino descent who have fair complexions and who are often subsumed into the general "White" population, including on historical Census Bureau returns, which did not have a separate category for "Hispanic". That term did not refer to a race in the traditional conception of the term, as it was understood during the 19th century. Many Latinos were recorded on official US government records as simply "White". This is doubly true for fair-skinned Latinos who only speak English, and remains true to this day, as the primary marker of ethnicity for Latino group membership is not physical appearance but rather language spoken.

Lastly, there are a number Native American tribes with "thin-blooded" citizens who appear phenotypically White, such as the Choctaw Nation of Oklahoma, which has no minimum blood quantum and enrolls citizens based on lineal descent. Many of these people can easily pass as White if they choose; however, Native American identity is political as well as ethnic.

== Overview ==
In the U.S., symbolic ethnicity is an important component of American cultural identity, assumed as "a voluntary, personally chosen identity marker, rather than the totally ascribed characteristic" determined by physical appearance. As a sociological phenomenon, symbolic ethnicity is attributed to Americans of European ancestry, most of whom either are influenced by or assimilated to the White Anglo-Saxon Protestant (WASP) community.

As such, symbolic ethnicity is the process of social identity whereby the person's "ethnic identity is solely associated with iconic elements of the culture" from which he or she originated. Gans's investigations concentrated on the later generations of Roman Catholic and Jewish Americans who had "begun to re-associate themselves with their ethnic culture", noting that "the ethnic associations were mainly symbolic, and that the traditional community interactions were lost". Those Catholic and Jewish Americans identified "their ethnic race in a personal perspective, as opposed to a communal" perspective, which actions produced an "outward ethnic identity that uses superficial symbols and icons to label and categorizes a certain race". That is to say, people identify their ethnicity by way of images from the mass communications media, as accepted through past associations derived from social and historical judgments.

In (E)race: Symbolic Ethnicity and the Asian Image (1993), Stephen Lee describes symbolic ethnicity:

From unrelenting integration of outside influences, self-definition becomes less associated with the community as a collective and becomes more associated with personal ethnicity as self. As the definition of ethnicity becomes increasingly personal, the need to reassert the community associations decreases. Ethnicity then becomes a symbolic identity more than a lifestyle. The definition of ethnicity, as formed by cinema, follows this symbolic pattern. In fact, in most cinemas that deals with ethnic integration, ethnic lifestyle is inseparable from its symbolic codes. Ethnic lifestyle is not an associative or collective means of existence, but a symbolic code—an icon.

In the book Identity and Belonging: Rethinking Race and Ethnicity in Canadian Society (2006), by B. Singh Bolaria and Sean P. Hier, symbolic ethnicity is defined by, with, and in the actions of "individuals who identify as Irish, for example, on occasions such as Saint Patrick's Day, on family holidays, or for vacations. They do not usually belong to Irish-American organizations, live in Irish neighborhoods, work in Irish jobs, or marry other Irish people." Therefore, the symbolic identity of "being Irish" is:

. . . [an] ethnicity that is individualistic in nature and without real social cost for the individual. These symbolic identifications are essentially leisure-time activities, rooted in nuclear family traditions and reinforced by the voluntary enjoyable aspects of being ethnic.

In terms of the derogatory term Plastic Paddy used to describe symbolic ethnicity in the Irish diaspora, Hickman (2002) states that the use of this term was "a part of the process by which the second-generation Irish are positioned as inauthentic within the two identities, of Englishness and Irishness... The message from each is that second-generation Irish are 'really English' and many of the second-generation resist this." This perspective suggests that symbolic ethnicity is a result of assimilation and some assimilated individuals may prefer to explore a culture that they may not have been raised with to a significant extent.

Many displays of what could be argued to be symbolic ethnicity, such as the study of Scottish Gaelic by the Scottish diaspora in North America, do not necessarily conform to the stereotype of individuals feeling entitled to a cultural ethnicity due to ancestry. Most Gaelic learners in one study, even those with Scottish ancestry, stated that Gaelic ethnic identity was not related to ancestry.

== See also ==
- Plastic Paddy
- Symbolic religiosity
- Tartanry
