= Scottish cringe =

Cultural inferiority complex among some Scottish people

The Scottish cringe is a cultural cringe relating to Scotland, and claimed to exist by politicians and commentators.

These cultural commentators claim that a sense of cultural inferiority is felt by many Scots, particularly in relation to the dominance of English culture within the culture of the United Kingdom, and consequently a sense of Scottish resentment and underachievement. The cringe is said to manifest as feelings of low self-worth and embarrassment felt by Scottish people in response to overt expressions of Scottish cultural identity and heritage such as the Lowland Scots and Scottish Gaelic languages, and the kilt.

Jack McConnell, then-first minister, suggested in 2004 that the "Scottish cringe" included opposition to free-market capitalism and alleged that the cringe meant people felt "enterprise was even something to be ashamed of or embarrassed by".

== See also ==
- Kailyard school
- North Briton
- Mongrel complex, for Brazilians
- Scotlandshire
- Scottish national identity
- Tartanry
