= Plastic Brit =

Insult towards non British athletes

Plastic Brit, or Plastic Briton, is a pejorative term used to describe athletes who choose to represent Great Britain in international sport despite having personal connections to another country. Some media critics believe it undermines the purpose of international sport for the purpose of medals.

== History and use ==
The term "Plastic Brit" is derived from Plastic Paddy, which is used to describe people who claim to be Irish despite not residing in that country. While the concept gained the British media's attention in the run-up to the 2012 Summer Olympics, it had also been used in describing members of other British sporting teams. England's cricket team had a perceived problem of having too many foreign-born players. The England and Wales Cricket Board responded to the issue by lengthening the residency period before a foreign player can be accepted to play for England to seven years.

The term was popularised in the United Kingdom through its usage in the Daily Mail newspaper to describe athletes born outside the UK who had been selected to represent Great Britain at the London 2012 Summer Olympics. The term originally had foundations from South African-born Zola Budd having her British citizenship application fast tracked in order to represent Great Britain at the 1984 Summer Olympics in Los Angeles.

The term was used to describe a number of amateur wrestlers such as Myroslav Dykun and Yana Stadnik who had not been born in the UK and had been given British citizenship. Only one wrestler had competed for Great Britain at the 2012 Olympics, Ukrainian-born Olga Butkevych. British Wrestling had the majority of its host nation berths removed by the British Olympic Association because of British Wrestling's failing to reach set performance targets. The term; "Plastic Brit" was also used when there were calls for Arsenal's Spanish goalkeeper Manuel Almunia to play for the England national football team in 2009.

It was argued by some newspaper reporters that selecting athletes born outside of the UK was discriminatory against British-born athletes and was against the spirit of the Olympics. In 2012, the International Olympic Committee (IOC) imposed a mandatory three-year waiting period before athletes could compete in the Olympics for another country. In response, International Olympic Committee chairman Jacques Rogge said, "Then there are cases where there is support [for athletes competing for other countries] but they go because there is a bigger gain [for the athlete] in another country. Legally we can't stop it but it doesn't mean we love it." In 2015, the term was also erroneously levelled at sprinter Zharnel Hughes by some newspapers despite Hughes having British citizenship by virtue of being born in Anguilla, a British Overseas Territory without IOC recognition.

== Criticism ==
The term "Plastic Brit" has been criticised in the British media. The Daily Telegraph suggested that fans overlook athletes' places of birth if they perform well for Great Britain. The Guardian newspaper criticised the Daily Mail's usage of the term, saying that the definition of a "Plastic Brit" was inconsistent and that under some definitions, some British-born athletes such as Ryan Giggs would be classed as "Plastic Brits" for failing to sing "God Save the Queen". The Daily Mirror newspaper also said that the Daily Mail, along with other newspapers, had supported the selection of Zola Budd to represent Great Britain at the 1984 Olympic Games. The Independent newspaper said that a third of Great Britain's gold medal winners at the Olympics and Paralympic games had a non-British parent or had been born outside of the UK.

A number of athletes were also critical of the term. Triple jumper Yamilé Aldama, who had been described as a "Plastic Brit", openly criticised the term in an article in The Guardian newspaper. She said, "I have lived in this country for 11 years, I am married to a British man, I have British children, I train under a British coach, at a British club. This is my home. What are they talking about?". She also said that a number of other athletes, including Farah and Kevin Pietersen—who had represented Great Britain and the England cricket team respectively—had not been born in the United Kingdom but were not branded as "Plastic Brits". Marathon runner Paula Radcliffe also criticised the term, asking for Great Britain supporters at the Olympics to support every athlete representing Great Britain, regardless of their countries of origin. Long-distance runner Mo Farah, when asked by a journalist if he should run for Somalia, said, "Look mate, this is my country. This is where I grew up, this is where I started life. This is my country and when I put on my Great Britain vest I'm proud. I'm very proud." Fijian-born Paralympic discus thrower Derek Derenalagi said in the Evening Standard that he was a "Titanium Brit" after he lost his legs in an explosion while serving with the British Army.
