= Plastic Paddy =

Slang expression

Plastic Paddy is a slang expression, sometimes used as a derogatory term, for a member of the Irish diaspora who "places great importance on Irishness". The phrase has been used as a positive reinforcement and as a pejorative term in various situations, particularly in London but also within Ireland itself. The term is sometimes associated with the misappropriation or misrepresentation of stereotypical aspects of Irish customs. In this sense, the term is an accusation that the person knows little of actual Irish culture, but nevertheless assert an Irish identity. It has been described as a slur in its initial use to target second generation Irish immigrants in the United Kingdom. In other contexts, the term has been applied to members of the Irish diaspora who have distanced themselves from perceived stereotypes and, in the 1980s, the phrase was used to describe Irish people who had emigrated to England and were seeking assimilation into English culture.

== Usage ==
The name Paddy is a diminutive form of the Irish name Patrick (Pádraic, Pádraig, Páraic) and, depending on context, can be used either as an affectionate or a pejorative reference to an Irishman.

The term "plastic Paddy", used as a slur or insult, came into use in the 1980s when it was employed as a term of abuse against the second generation Irish diaspora in London by recently arrived middle-class Irish migrants. Mary J. Hickman, a professor of Irish studies and sociology at London Metropolitan University, states: it "became a means of distancing themselves from established Irish communities." And the use was a part of the process by which the second-generation Irish are positioned as inauthentic within the two identities, of Englishness and Irishness.

Ironically, both English hostility when faced with the spectre of Irish identities, and Irish denials of authenticity of those same identities, utilises the pejorative term "plastic paddy" to stereotype and undermine processes "of becoming" of Irish identities of second-generation Irish people. The message from each is that second-generation Irish are "really English" and many of the second-generation resist this.

People who were not born in Ireland and/or did not grow up in Ireland, but nonetheless possess Irish citizenship (either through descent, marriage, or residence) are sometimes labelled "plastic Paddies" by members of Irish communities.

The term can have a different connotation depending on where it is used.

=== Ireland ===
Within Ireland, "plastic Paddy" can be used to refer to someone, including members of the Irish diaspora, enacting ethnic stereotypes or what may be perceived as negative or outdated portrayals of Ireland or Irish culture. This is often seen in non-Irish citizens who have a romantic or noble savage image of "the Irish Race" and those who enact stereotypes to appeal to tourists. Writing for IrishCentral.com in 2017, James Murphy noted that those applying the term broadly to members of the Irish diaspora were, in turn, doing so based on an outdated, inaccurate and "narrow perspective" of the diaspora.

The Killarney Active Retirement Association displayed a banner promising to "Chase the plastic Paddy out of Ireland" in the Kerry 2005 St Patrick's Day celebrations, and Irish journalists have used the term to characterise Irish bars in the diaspora as inauthentic and with the "minimum of plastic paddy trimmings".

"Plastic Paddy" has also been used as a derogatory term for Irish people who identify more with English culture than its Irish counterpart, such as those who support English football teams. First generation Irish-English model Erin O'Connor was called a "plastic Paddy" in Ireland due to her parents' choice of forename and non-Irish birth despite their both being Irish citizens.

=== Great Britain ===
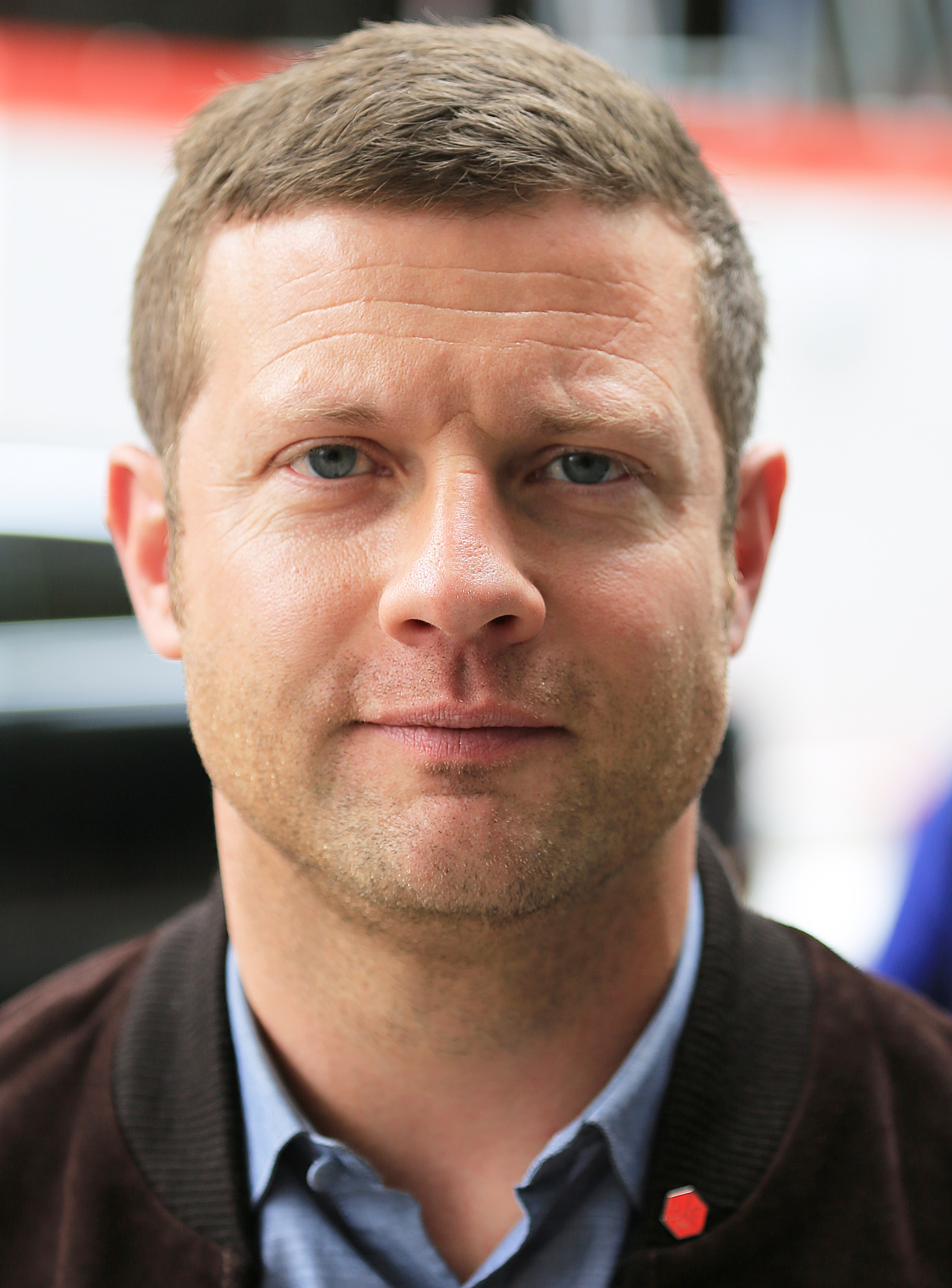
Broadcaster Dermot O'Leary, born and raised in England to Irish parents, has described his upbringing as "classic plastic Paddy"

Mary J. Hickman writes that "plastic Paddy" was a term used to "deny and denigrate the second-generation Irish in Britain" in the 1980s, and was "frequently articulated by the new middle-class Irish immigrants in Britain, for whom it was a means of distancing themselves from established Irish communities". According to Bronwen Walter, Professor of Irish Diaspora Studies at Anglia Ruskin University, the adoption of a hyphenated identity has been "much more problematic" for second-generation Irish people in Britain. Walter states that the majority of these people have "frequently denied the authenticity of their Irish identity" by referring to themselves as "plastic Paddies", while the English people around them regard them as "assimilated and simply English".

The term has been used to taunt non-Irish born players who choose to play for the Republic of Ireland national football team, fans of Irish teams who are members of supporters clubs outside Ireland, and other Irish individuals living in Britain. A study by the University of Strathclyde and Nil by Mouth found the term was used abusively on Celtic and Rangers supporters' Internet forums in reference to Celtic supporters and the wider Catholic community in Scotland. In August 2009, a man in Birmingham received a suspended sentence after making derogatory comments to a police officer who was of Irish descent. The prosecutor said the man had made racist remarks about the officer, including accusations that the officer was a "plastic Paddy".

In Peter Stanford's book Why I Am Still a Catholic: Essays in Faith and Perseverance, the broadcaster Dermot O'Leary (who was born and raised in England to Irish parents) describes his upbringing as "classic plastic Paddy", mentioning that his cousins in Ireland would tease him for "being English" but would defend him if other Irish people tried to do the same. The comedian Jimmy Carr has also described himself as a "plastic Paddy".

Brendan O'Neill uses the term in Spiked to refer to "second-generation wannabe" Irishmen, and writes that some of those guilty of "plastic Paddyism" (or, in his words, "Dermot-itis") include Bill Clinton, Daniel Day-Lewis and Shane MacGowan.

=== United States ===
Plastic Paddy is typically used in a derogatory fashion towards those who identify as Irish Americans or who celebrate "Irishness" on Saint Patrick's Day, accusing them of having little actual connection to Irish culture. For example, in 2009, the British mixed martial arts fighter Dan Hardy called American fighter Marcus Davis a "plastic Paddy" due to Marcus' perceived use of "gimmicks" to indicate his Irish ancestry.

Alex Massie, a Scottish journalist, wrote in National Review:

When I was a student in Dublin we scoffed at the American celebration of St. Patrick, finding something preposterous in the green beer, the search for any connection, no matter how tenuous, to Ireland, the misty sentiment of it all that seemed so at odds with the Ireland we knew and actually lived in. Who were these people dressed as Leprechauns and why were they dressed that way? This Hibernian Brigadoon was a sham, a mockery, a Shamrockery of real Ireland and a remarkable exhibition of plastic paddyness. But at least it was confined to the Irish abroad and those foreigners desperate to find some trace of green in their blood.

== See also ==
- Cultural cringe
- "Irish Blood, English Heart"
- Plastic Brit
- Plastic shaman
- Symbolic ethnicity
- Tartanry
- West Brit
