= Herbert J. Gans =

German-American sociologist (1927–2025)

- Born: May 7, 1927; Cologne, Rhine Province, Prussia, Germany
- Died: April 21, 2025 (aged 97); New York City, U.S.
- Citizenship: American
- Education: University of Chicago; University of Pennsylvania
- Spouse: Louise Gruner
- Children: David Herman Gans
- Scientific career
- Fields: Sociology, social planning
- Workplaces: Columbia University (1971–2007)
- Doctoral advisor: Martin Meyerson

Herbert Julius Gans (May 7, 1927 – April 21, 2025) was a German-born American sociologist who taught at Columbia University from 1971 to 2007.

One of the most prolific and influential sociologists of his generation, Gans came to America in 1940 as a refugee from Nazi Germany and sometimes described his scholarly work as an immigrant's attempt to understand America. He trained in sociology at the University of Chicago, where he studied with David Riesman and Everett Hughes, among others, and in social planning at the University of Pennsylvania, where his dissertation was supervised by Martin Meyerson.

Herbert J. Gans served as the 79th President of the American Sociological Association in 1988.

== Biography ==
Herbert Julius Gans was born in Cologne, Germany on May 7, 1927. Gans arrived in the United States in 1940, becoming a citizen in 1945. Gans studied at the University of Chicago, receiving a M.A. in 1950. He went on to receive a PhD in Sociology and Planning from the University of Pennsylvania in 1957. Gans moved to Columbia University in 1971, serving as the Robert S. Lynd Professor of Sociology in 1985.

In the late 1950s, Gans was married to the artist Iris Lezak.

Gans married Louise Gruner in 1967. Their son is David Herman Gans.

Gans died at his home in New York City, on April 21, 2025, at the age of 97.

== Sociological research ==
Although Gans viewed his career as spanning six fields of research, he initially made his reputation as a critic of urban renewal in the early 1960s. His first book, The Urban Villagers (1962), described Boston's diverse West End neighborhood, where he mainly studied its Italian-American working class community. The book is also well known for its critical analysis of the area's clearance as an alleged "slum" and the West Enders' displacement from their neighborhood.

One of the hallmarks of Gans's work is his willingness to challenge conventional wisdom. His 1967 book The Levittowners was based on several years of participant-observation in New Jersey's Levitt-built suburb in Willingboro, observing how a set of new homeowners came together to establish the community's formal and informal organizations. Demonstrating the inaccuracy of the popular depiction of the post-war suburbs as homogeneous, conformist and anomic, Gans showed that Levittown was in many ways a typical lower middle class suburb, the residents' class and other differences structuring the social and political life of the community.

=== Studies in news media ===
Gans's third major participant-observation study, of the national news media, was conducted in the newsrooms of NBC and CBS and the editorial offices of Time and Newsweek. The major theme of the work is reflected in its title, Deciding What's News.

He published several other studies of the news media and the entertainment media, the best known being Popular Culture and High Culture (1974, 1999). In it, he challenged the conventional wisdom that high culture aesthetic standards were universal, arguing instead that cultural tastes reflect educational levels and other aspects of class.

His work on the media, like his community studies, has a populist theme, aiming to look at American society from the perspective of the country's working and lower middle class majority.

== Public policy ==
Like some other sociologists who began their careers in the mid-twentieth century, Gans was active both as a scholar and advocate, advising urban planning, antipoverty and other public policy agencies. He served as a consultant to the National Advisory Commission on Civil Disorders (also known as the Kerner Commission), testified before the commission, and drafted what became Chapter 9 of the commission's final report (this chapter discussed why the experiences of earlier European immigrants at escaping poverty were not comparable to what contemporary Blacks were experiencing). In his writings on poverty, Gans offered rigorous, often scathing criticism of the weaknesses of such concepts as "the culture of poverty," and the "underclass," most notably in The War Against the Poor (1995). However, "The Positive Functions of Poverty" (1972), his most widely reprinted article, catalogued the benefits the more affluent classes derived from the existence of poverty and the poor. George Ritzer reports, "It has been said that he wrote this article, at least in part, as a parody of [Merton's] structural-functional analysis, [... but] whatever his motivations, Gans produced an excellent illustration of how structural-functional analysis can be used." Gans also continued to write critically about what he called the fallacy of "architectural determinism," namely the belief that urban planning and architecture could solve the problems of poverty and low civic engagement.

His two collections of planning and social policy essays, People and Plans (1968) and People, Plans and Policies (1992) offered his most sustained criticism of spatial planning as a vehicle for significant social reform.

In his address as the 1988 president of the American Sociological Association, Gans urged the discipline to become more useful to and relevant for the general public. In it, he used the term "public sociology," which twenty years later became the centerpiece of a reform movement within the discipline. He also published a trio of articles on the sociology of sociology, later reprinted in his Making Sense of America (1999).

Still active as an emeritus professor, an adjunct professor, and a writer, in 2008 Gans published a new book on public policy and politics, Imagining America in 2033. "The book describes the policies and political processes by which America overcame the economic, military and other disasters of the century's first decade and began to turn into a more democratic, egalitarian, peaceful and human society."

He publicly opposed ROTC as being “in part a leadership training program for the killing of other people and the destruction of their societies.”

== Publications ==
- The Balanced community (1961)
- The Urban Villagers: Group and Class in the Life of Italian-Americans. Free Press. 1962. ISBN 978-0-02-911240-3.
- The Levittowners: Ways of Life and Politics in a New Suburban Community (PDF). Columbia University Press. 1967. ISBN 0-231-05571-4. Archived from the original (PDF) on November 9, 2005.
- People and Plans (1968)
- More Equality (1973)
- Popular Culture and High Culture (1974)
- Deciding What's News: A study of CBS evening news, NBC nightly news, Newsweek, and Time (1979)
- Middle American Individualism (1988)
- People, Plans, and Policies (1991)
- The War Against The Poor (1992)
- Making Sense of America (1999)
- Democracy and the News (2003)
- Imagining America in 2033: How the Country Put Itself Together After Bush University of Michigan Press, Ann Arbor, 2009.
- Gans, Herbert J. (2009). "Working in Six Research Areas: A Multi-Field Sociological Career". Annual Review of Sociology. 35: 1–19. doi:10.1146/annurev-soc-070308-115936.

== Terms coined ==
- Symbolic ethnicity
- Symbolic religiosity
